= Korisliiga Most Valuable Player =

Finnish basketball award

In the Korisliiga, the top Finnish professional basketball league, two awards are considered the Most Valuable Player award. The first, the Player of the Year, goes to the best Finnish player in the league. The second, is the Best Foreigner (in Finnish, vuoden ulkomaalaisvahvistus).

== Key ==
*		Inducted into the Finnish Basketball Hall of Fame			
Player (X)		Denotes the number of times the player had been the scoring leader up to and including that season			
G	Guard	F	Forward	C	Center

== Import Players ==
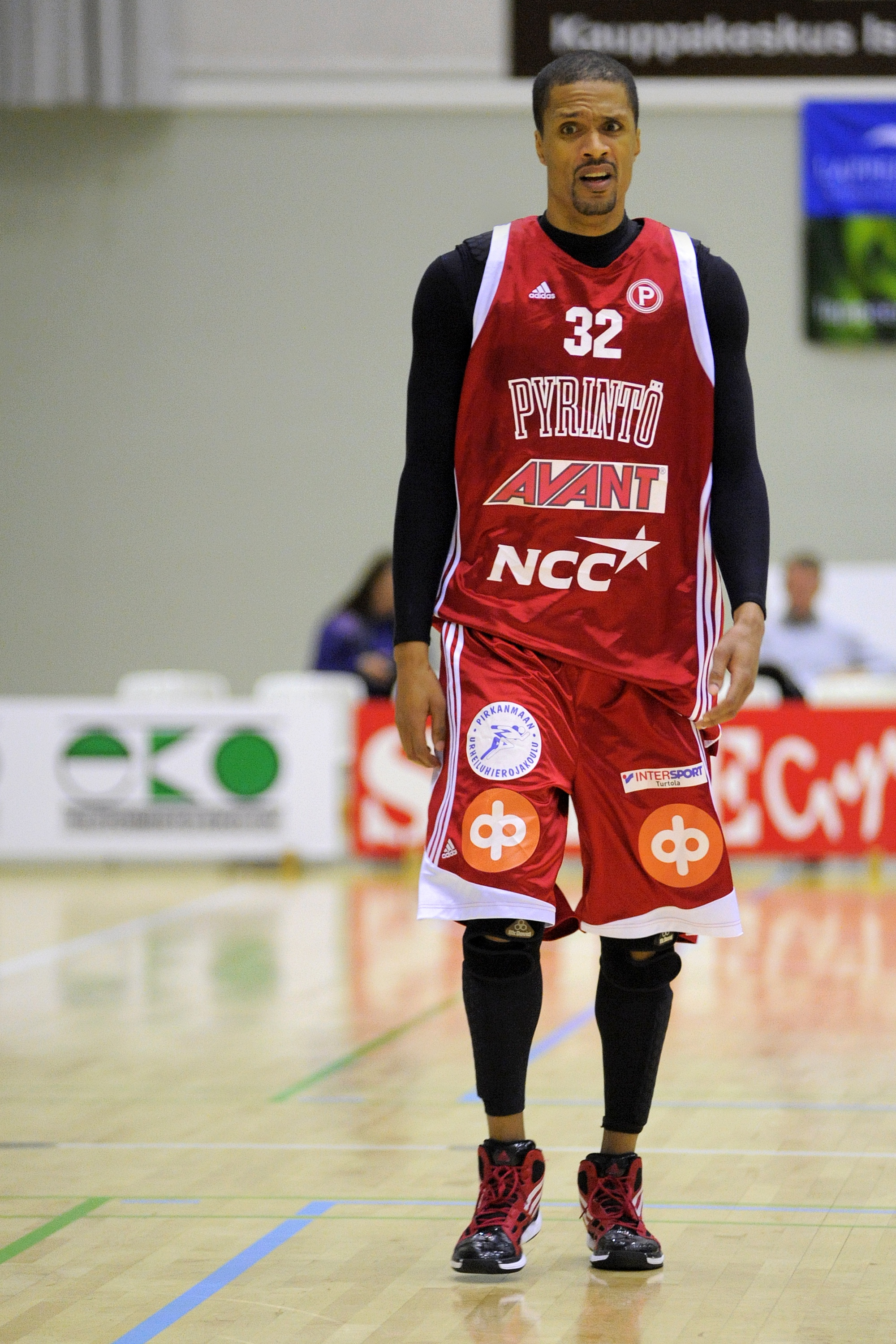
Damon Williams won the award twice

Season	Player	Pos.	Nationality	Team	Ref(s)
1996–97	Kurk Lee	PG	United States	Torpan Pojat	
1997–98	James Gatewood	F	United States	Torpan Pojat	
1998–99	Faisal Abraham	F	U.S. Virgin Islands	Salon Vilpas	
1999–00	Marcus Grant	F	United States	Namika Lahti	
2000–01	Damon Williams	F	United States	Pyrbasket	
2001–02	Lonnie Cooper	G	United States	Espoon Honka	
2002–03	Marcus Grant (2×)	F	United States	Espoon Honka	
2003–04	Marcus Grant (3×)	F	United States	Kouvot	
2004–05	Tim Kisner	G	United States	Salon Vilpas	
2005–06	Boakai Lalugba	F	Liberia (Note: Boakai Lalugba also owns the United States' nationality)	UU Korihait	
2006–07	Jerald Fields	F	United States	KTP-Basket	
2007–08	Corey Smith	G	United States	Kouvot	
2008–09	Ray Nixon	F	United States	Namika Lahti	
2009–10	A. J. Moye	G	United States	Kouvot	
2010–11	Damon Williams (2×)	F	United States	Tampereen Pyrintö	
2011–12	Jeb Ivey	PG	United States	Nilan Bisons Loimaa	
2012–13	Martin Zeno	G	United States	Nilan Bisons	
2013–14	Kyle Fogg	PG	United States	Korikobrat	
2014–15	Robert Arnold	SF	United States	Joensuun Kataja	
2015–16	Lamont Jones	G	United States	Kobrat	
2016–17	Juwan Staten	PG	United States	Vilpas Vikings	
2017–18	Aaron Jones	C	United States	Vilpas Vikings	
2018–19	René Rougeau	SF	United States	Kauhajoen Karhu	
2020–21	Jeremiah Wood	F	United States	Salon Vilpas	
2021–22	Cameron Jones	G	United States	Kauhajoen Karhu	
2022–23	Jeffrey Carroll	F	United States	Helsinki Seagulls	
2023–24	Both Gach	G	United States	BC Nokia	
2024–25	René Rougeau (2x)	SF	United States	Helsinki Seagulls	

== Finnish Players ==
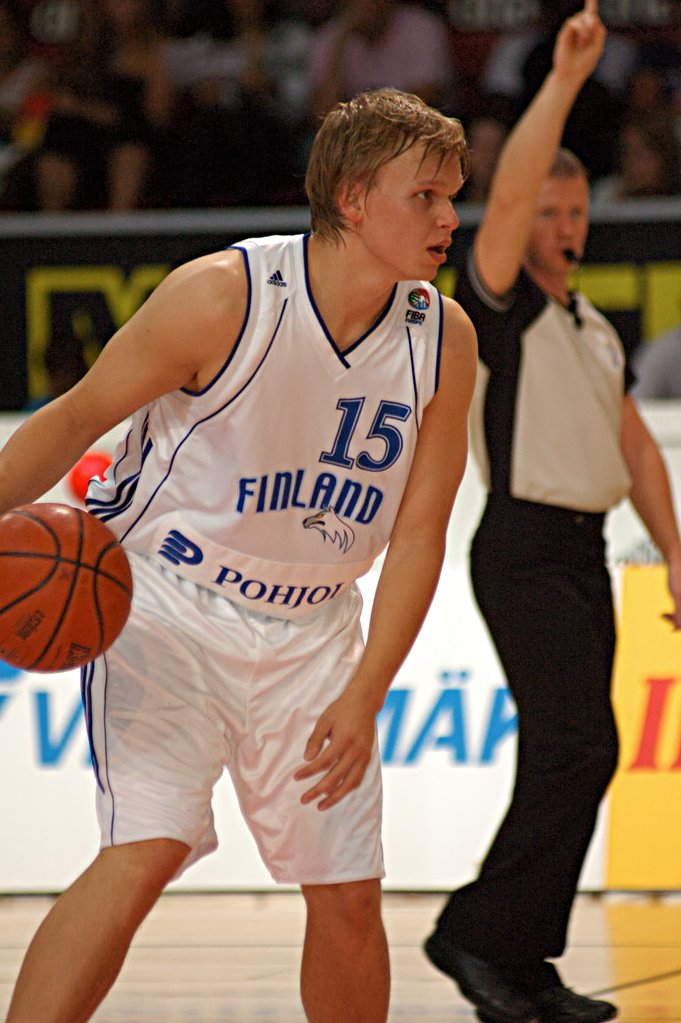
Teemu Rannikko is a three-times award winner

Season	Player	Pos.	Team	Ref(s)
1986–87	Mikael Salmi		Helsingin NMKY	
1987–88	Sakari Pehkonen		Helsingin NMKY	
1988–89	Pekka Markkanen		Urheilijat	
1989–90	Petteri Nieminen		Uudenkaupungin Urheilijat	
1990–91	Larry Pounds*		KTP-Basket	
1991–92	Petri Niiranen		Helsingin NMKY	
1992–93	Kari-Pekka Klinga*		Torpan Pojat	
1993–94	Petri Niiranen (2)		Helsingin NMKY	
1994–95	Kari-Pekka Klinga (2)*		Torpan Pojat	
1995–96	Markku Larkio		New Wave	
1996–97	Mika-Matti Tahvanainen		Lahden NMKY	
1997–98	Pasi Riihelä		Kouvot	
1998–99	Teemu Rannikko		Piiloset	
1999–00	Teemu Rannikko (2)		Piiloset	
2000–01	Roope Mäkelä		Espoon Honka	
2001–02	Jukka Toijala		Joensuun Kataja	
2002–03	Petri Virtanen		BC Jyväskylä	
2003–04	Pasi Riihelä		Lappeenrannan NMKY	
2004–05	Pasi Riihelä (2)		Lappeenrannan NMKY	
2005–06	Petri Virtanen (2)		Joensuun Kataja	
2006–07	Sami Lehtoranta (2)		Joensuun Kataja	
2007–08	Petteri Koponen		Espoon Honka	
2008–09	Antti Nikkilä		Tampereen Pyrintö	
2009–10	Tuukka Kotti		Espoon Honka	
2010–11	Ville Kaunisto		Kouvot	
2011–12	Sami Lehtoranta (2)	PF	Joensuun Kataja	
2012–13	Samuel Haanpää	SG	Korikobrat	
2013–14	Antero Lehto	PG	Tampereen Pyrintö	
2014–15	Teemu Rannikko (3)	PG	Joensuun Kataja	
2015–16	Teemu Rannikko (4)	PG	Joensuun Kataja	
2016–17	Antto Nikkarinen	PF	Helsinki Seagulls	
2017–18	Tuukka Kotti	C	Helsinki Seagulls	
2018–19	Topias Palmi	G	Joensuun Kataja	
2020–21	Okko Järvi	G	Karhu Basket	
2021–22	Remu Raitanen	F/C	KTP-Basket	
2022–23	Severi Kaukiainen	G	Karhu Basket	
2023–24	Topias Palmi (2)	G	Karhu Basket	
2024-25	Lassi Nikkarinen	PG	Helsinki Seagulls	

== Players with most awards ==
Player	Editions	Notes
(Finland) Teemu Rannikko	4	1999, 2000, 2O15, 2016
(United States) Damon Williams	2	2001, 2011
(United States) Marcus Grant	2	2003, 2004
(United States) René Rougeau	2	2019, 2025
(Finland) Petri Niiranen	2	1992, 1994
(Finland) Sami Lehtoranta	2	2007, 2012
(Finland) Topias Palmi	2	2019, 2024
(Finland) Petri Virtanen	2	2003, 2006
(Finland) Kari-Pekka Klinga	2	1993, 1995
(Finland) Pasi Riihelä	2	2004, 2005
