= Aaron Jones (basketball) =

American basketball player (born 1993)

No. 34 – ZTE KK
- Position: Center / power forward
- League: Nemzeti Bajnokság I/A

Personal information
- Born: July 26, 1993 (age 33) Tuscaloosa, Alabama, U.S.
- Listed height: 2.06 m (6 ft 9 in)
- Listed weight: 107 kg (236 lb)

Career information
- High school: Gautier (Gautier, Mississippi)
- College: Ole Miss (2011–2015)
- NBA draft: 2015: undrafted
- Playing career: 2015–present

Career history
- 2015–2016: Rhein Stars Köln
- 2016–2017: BC Beroe
- 2017–2018: Vilpas Vikings
- 2018: Lhasa Pure Land
- 2018–2019: Rethymno Cretan Kings
- 2019–2020: Crailsheim Merlins
- 2020: Bilbao Basket
- 2020–2021: Cholet Basket
- 2021–2022: Universo Treviso
- 2022–2023: Mersin BSB
- 2023: VEF Rīga
- 2023: Tallinna Kalev/SNABB
- 2023–2024: Harem Spor
- 2024: Karditsa
- 2024: Golden Eagle Ylli
- 2024–present: ZTE KK

Career highlights
- Korisliiga Foreign MVP (2018); Balkan League champion (2017); Bulgarian Cup winner (2017)

Aaron Eugene Jones (born July 26, 1993) is an American professional basketball player for ZTE KK of the Nemzeti Bajnokság I/A. He played college basketball for the Ole Miss Rebels.

== Early life and college career ==
Jones attended Gautier High School in Gautier, Mississippi. During his years (2011–15) at Ole Miss, Jones averaged 3.61 PPG, with a highest average coming in his junior year, 6.00. During his senior year, Jones was suspended for three games in a "violation of team rules".

== Professional career ==
On June 27, 2017, Jones signed a one-year deal with the Finnish team Vilpas Vikings. On November 15, 2017, Jones recorded a double-double of 33 points and 23 rebounds – a career-high in both categories, shooting 13-of-17 from the field, along with 3 steals and 4 blocks in a 96–90 overtime win over Kouvot. In 53 games played for the Vikings, Jones averaged 15.6 points, 11 rebounds, 2.3 assists and 1.8 blocks per game. Jones helped the Vikings to reach the 2018 Korisliiga Finals, where they eventually lost to Kauhajoki Karhu Basket, and he was named the league's Foreign MVP.

On July 2, 2018, Jones signed with Lhasa Pure Land of the Chinese NBL for the rest of the season.

On July 30, 2018, Jones signed a one-year deal with the Israeli team Maccabi Rehovot of the Liga Leumit. However, on October 17, 2018, he parted ways with Rehovot before appearing in a game for them.

On June 24, 2019, he signed a deal with the Crailsheim Merlins of the Basketball Bundesliga. He averaged 11.8 points and 6.5 rebounds per game. Jones signed a two-year deal with RETAbet Bilbao Basket of the Liga ACB on July 11, 2020. In eight games he averaged 4.1 points, 3.8 rebounds and 1.0 assist per game. On November 20, Jones signed with Cholet Basket of the LNB Pro A.

On July 5, 2021, Jones signed with Universo Treviso of the Lega Basket Serie A.

== The Basketball Tournament ==
In 2017, Jones participated in The Basketball Tournament, playing for Ole Hotty Toddy, a team of Ole Miss alumni. The team was upset in the first round of the tournament by team NC Prodigal Sons. The Basketball Tournament is an annual $2 million winner-take-all tournament that is broadcast on ESPN.
