= 2019–20 Korisliiga season =

Professional basketball season in Finland

Korisliiga
- Season: 2019–20
- Teams: 12

The 2019–20 Korisliiga season was the 80th season of the top professional basketball league in Finland. Karhu were the defending champions. On 13 March 2020, the season was ended prematurely due to the coronavirus pandemic.

== Format ==
The eleven teams would play four teams against each one of the other teams for a total of 40 games. The eight best qualified teams would join the playoffs, the 11th qualified would play a best-of-three relegation playoff against the First Division runners-up and the last team would be directly relegated.

However, the league ended without finishing the regular season.

== Teams ==
Location of teams in the 2019–20 Korisliiga

Lahti promoted as champion of the First Division.

Team	City	Arena
Helsinki Seagulls	Helsinki	Töölö Sports Hall
Kataja	Joensuu	LähiTapiola Areena
Karhu	Kauhajoki	Kauhajoen Yhteiskoulu
Kobrat	Lapua	Lapuan Urheilutalo
Korihait	Uusikaupunki	Pohitullin Sports Hall
Kouvot	Kouvola	Mansikka-Ahon Urheiluhalli
KTP	Kotka	Steveco-Areena
Lahti	Lahti	Energia Areena
Nokia	Nokia	Nokian Palloiluhalli
Pyrintö	Tampere	Pyynikin Palloiluhalli
Salon Vilpas	Vilpas	Salohalli
Ura eGameStars	Kaarina	Kupittaan palloiluhalli

== Regular season ==
=== League table ===
Pos	Team	Pld	W	L	PF	PA	PD	Pts	Qualification
1	Salon Vilpas	36	30	6	3356	2840	+516	60	Qualification for the playoffs
2	Helsinki Seagulls	36	30	6	3338	2860	+478	60	Qualification for the playoffs
3	Karhu	37	28	9	3250	2904	+346	56	Qualification for the playoffs
4	KTP	36	19	17	3246	3158	+88	38	Qualification for the playoffs
5	Pyrintö	37	19	18	3358	3385	−27	38	Qualification for the playoffs
6	Nokia	37	18	19	3141	3114	+27	36	Qualification for the playoffs
7	Kataja	36	17	19	3070	3100	−30	34	Qualification for the playoffs
8	Kouvot	36	15	21	3048	3085	−37	30	Qualification for the playoffs
9	Lahti	36	12	24	3011	3179	−168	24	
10	Ura eGameStars	36	12	24	3027	3377	−350	24	
11	Kobrat	36	11	25	2965	3248	−283	22	Qualification to relegation playoffs
12	Korihait	37	7	30	2914	3474	−560	14	Relegated to First Division

Updated to match(es) played on 11 March 2020. Source: Korisliiga

=== Results ===
Home \ Away	HEL	KAU	KAT	KOB	KOR	KOU	KTP	LAH	NOK	PYR	VIL	URA	HEL	KAU	KAT	KOB	KOR	KOU	KTP	LAH	NOK	PYR	VIL	URA
Helsinki Seagulls	—	72–66	89–80	94–64	109–75	98–63	76–75	80–64	102–83	103–89	111–76	97–80	—		97–74			97–88	97–79	91–72	113–76	104–72		96–86
Karhu	93–100	—	89–74	86–64	81–69	96–79	95–71	84–92	94–102	79–75	70–69	93–72	91–71	—		86–70	92–76	94–86	88–75	88–67	88–76			
Kataja	99–106	80–106	—	91–67	95–77	95–86	91–86	62–82	79–72	88–73	76–78	97–72	71–85	89–95	—					91–86	89–86	99–82	89–88	102–81
Kobrat	70–96	81–96	82–94	—	88–89	88–77	90–80	79–99	80–81	97–92	90–84	102–85	72–87	71–89		—	105–79		75–86	77–90	65–81		84–107	82–68
Korihait	68–108	79–81	69–84	88–94	—	88–75	71–106	66–87	55–91	94–96	63–95	89–108	70–104		90–87	82–94	—	78–99	91–82		71–102	98–75		83–96
Kouvot	81–71	75–87	84–88	96–81	108–75	—	98–86	84–83	79–86	102–86	59–69	97–82	66–85		81–73	92–70	86–88	—	85–95		75–94	85–84		
KTP	101–85	88–93	100–82	109–97	99–84	98–71	—	94–85	97–79	104–96	78–89	100–72	101–85	89–95	84–80	88–94			—		78–101	102–77	92–129	113–78
Lahti	84–90	75–84	86–69	81–92	106–73	95–104	95–98	—	71–87	84–88	91–99	84–81	95–82	60–99			86–81	73–100		—	77–75		75–111	
Nokia	83–90	81–72	102–94	98–69	88–82	68–77	72–85	94–81	—	91–97	73–83	100–84		63–87	89–84				77–86	90–88	—	93–97	77–84	90–82
Pyrintö	91–105	86–73	99–102	105–88	87–78	69–94	103–99	115–104	110–90	—	85–96	119–77		92–90	82–104	86–84	98–78	101–94		101–65		—	75–89	127–88
Salon Vilpas	100–88	82–68	97–65	105–91	92–77	95–77	88–90	89–84	77–74	99–77	—	100–76	81–62	90–72	87–80		115–65	93–82	97–76	106–85			—	
Ura eGameStars	82–97	83–117	85–73	117–93	77–92	99–89	82–77	102–98	92–76	83–86	92–87	—		80–93		84–75	98–83	77–74		73–81		82–85	71–130	—

Updated to match(es) played on 11 March 2020. Source: Korisliiga
Legend: Blue = home team win; Red = away team win.

== Relegation playoffs ==
Team 1	Series	Team 2	Game 1	Game 2	Game 3

== Finnish clubs in European competitions ==
Team	Competition	Progress
Karhu	Champions League	Second qualifying round
Kataja	FIBA Europe Cup	Regular season
