= Lassi Nikkarinen =

Finnish basketball player (born 1997)

GAPA Hradec Králové
- Position: Point guard
- League: CZNBL

Personal information
- Born: March 11, 1997 (age 29) Helsinki, Finland
- Listed height: 1.87 m (6 ft 2 in)
- Listed weight: 78 kg (172 lb)

Career information
- High school: Helsinki Basketball Academy (Helsinki, Finland)
- College: Montana State (2017–2019)
- NBA draft: 2020: undrafted
- Playing career: 2013–present

Career history
- 2013–2017: HBA-Märsky
- 2019–2021: BC Nokia
- 2021–2025: Helsinki Seagulls
- 2025: Fuenlabrada
- 2025–present: Hradec Králové

Career highlights
- 2x Korisliiga champion (2023, 2025); Finnish Cup winner (2022); Korisliiga Most Valuable Player (2025); 3x Korisliiga Defensive Player of the Year (2021, 2022, 2025)

Lassi Paavo Verner Nikkarinen (born 11 March 1997) is a Finnish professional basketball player for Czech team GAPA Hradec Králové.

== National team career ==
Nikkarinen is a former youth international and has represented Finland U16, Finland U18 and Finland U20 national teams. He has played seven games with the Finland men's national basketball team.

== Personal life ==
His second cousin Antto Nikkarinen is also basketball player in Korisliiga.

== Career statistics ==
Legend
GP	Games played	GS	Games started	MPG	Minutes per game
FG%	Field goal percentage	3P%	3-point field goal percentage	FT%	Free throw percentage
RPG	Rebounds per game	APG	Assists per game	SPG	Steals per game
BPG	Blocks per game	PPG	Points per game	**Bold**	Career high

=== College ===
Year	Team	GP	GS	MPG	FG%	3P%	FT%	RPG	APG	SPG	BPG	PPG
2017–18	Montana State	23	0	7.3	.308	**.375**	**.800**	.6	.6	.3	.0	.7
2018–19	Montana State	**30**	**5**	**14.2**	**.407**	.259	.667	**1.0**	**1.3**	**.5**	.0	**2.3**
Career		53	5	11.2	.388	.286	.688	.8	1.0	.4	.0	1.6
