= Okko Järvi =

Finnish basketball player (born 1996)

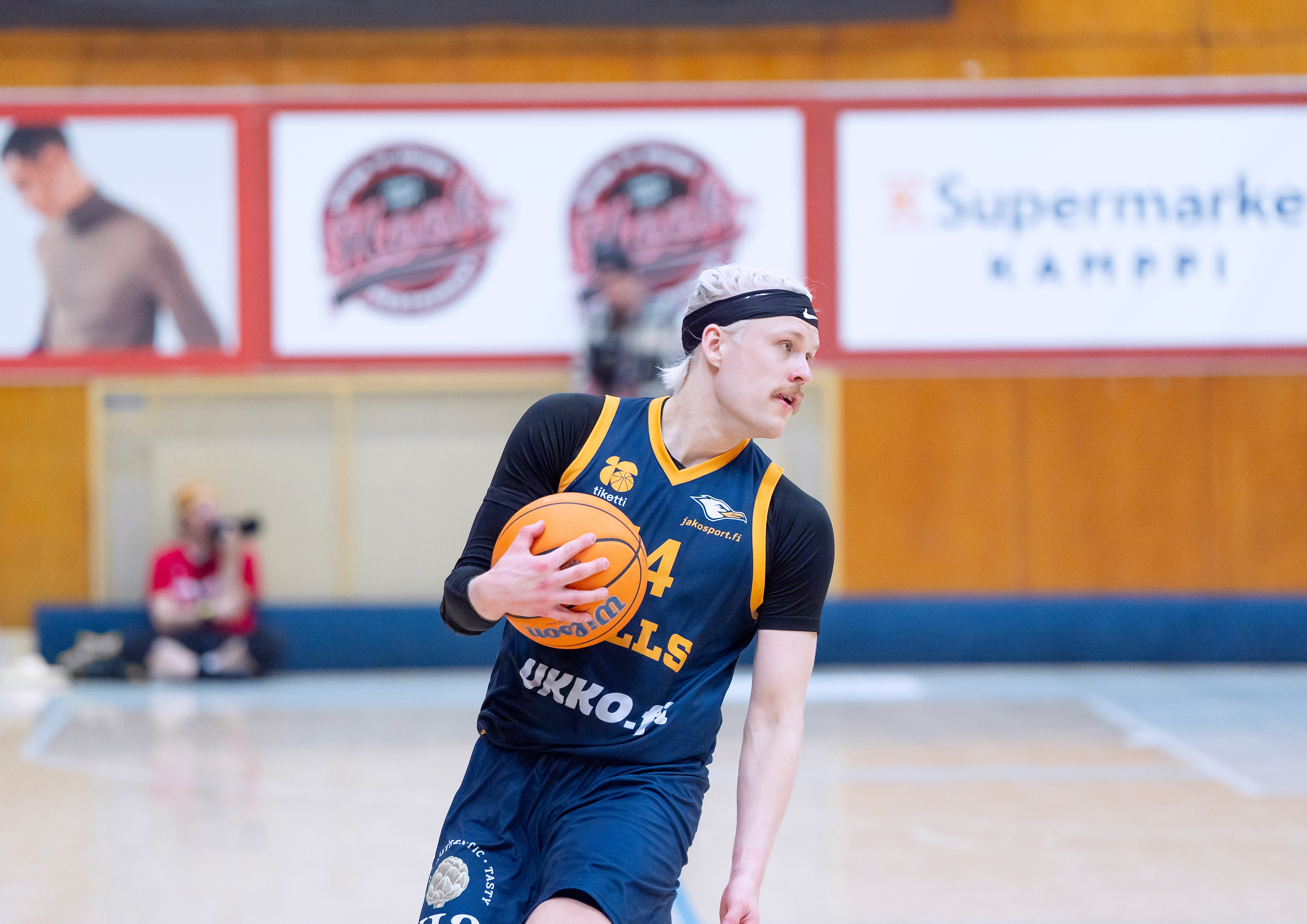
- Järvi with Helsinki Seagulls in 2024

Mens Sana
- Position: Shooting guard
- League: Serie B

Personal information
- Born: 12 January 1996 (age 30) Vantaa, Finland
- Listed height: 1.93 m (6 ft 4 in)
- Listed weight: 93 kg (205 lb)

Career information
- Playing career: 2013–present

Career history
- 2013–2015: Tapiolan Honka
- 2015–2017: Salon Vilpas
- 2017–2018: Espoo United
- 2018–2021: Kauhajoki Karhu
- 2021–2022: Phoenix Brussels
- 2022–2024: Helsinki Seagulls
- 2024–2025: BC Pärnu
- 2025–2026: Kecskeméti TE
- 2026–present: Mens Sana Siena

Career highlights
- Korisliiga champion (2019, 2023); Korisliiga MVP (2021)

Okko Johannes Järvi (born 12 January 1996) is a Finnish professional basketball player who plays as a shooting guard for Mens Sana Siena in the Italian Serie B.

== Professional career ==
Järvi started his career with Tapiolan Honka in 2013.

Järvi has won two Finnish Korisliiga championship titles, with Karhu Basket in 2019 and with Helsinki Seagulls in 2023. Additionally, he has won three silver medals in Korisliiga and one silver medal in Finnish Basketball Cup. He was named the Korisliiga MVP in 2021 when playing for Karhu Basket. Järvi has also played in Belgium for Phoenix Brussels in the BNXT League.

After playing for Helsinki Seagulls for two seasons, Järvi moved to Estonia and signed with Pärnu Sadam in September 2024. He was named the MVP of the Month in January 2025 in Latvian–Estonian Basketball League.

At the end of August 2025, Järvi signed with Kecskeméti TE in the Hungarian Nemzeti Bajnokság I/A.
