= Henri Kantonen =

Finnish basketball player (born 1997)

Piteşti
- Position: Shooting guard
- League: Liga Națională

Personal information
- Born: 20 August 1997 (age 29) Finland
- Listed height: 1.98 m (6 ft 6 in)
- Listed weight: 94 kg (207 lb)

Career information
- Playing career: 2014–present

Career history
- 2014–2015: Pussihukat
- 2015–2016: JKS
- 2016–2017: Kouvot
- 2017–2018: Karhu Basket
- 2018–2020: Vilpas Vikings
- 2020–2021: Aix Maurienne
- 2021–2023: Karhu Basket
- 2023–2024: M Basket Mažeikiai
- 2025: Helsinki Seagulls
- 2025–2026: Kataja
- 2026–present: Argeș Pitești

Career highlights
- 3x Finnish Korisliiga champion (2018, 2022, 2025); Finnish Cup winner (2019); Korisliiga Most Improved Player (2018)

Henri Mikael Kantonen (born 20 August 1997) is a Finnish professional basketball player who plays as a shooting guard for Romanian Liga Națională team Argeș Pitești, and the Finland national team. Kantonen started playing basketball in a youth team of Torpan Pojat.

== Professional career ==
Kantonen has won two Finnish championship titles with Kauhajoki Karhu Basket in 2018 and 2022, during his two stints with the club. He was awarded the Korisliiga Most Improved Player in 2018. In 2019, Kantonen also won the Finnish Cup with Salon Vilpas.

During the 2020–21 season, Kantonen played for Aix Maurienne in French LNB Pro B,

In September 2023, Kantonen signed with Mažeikiai in Lithuanian Betsafe LKL. On 23 February 2024, he suffered a season-ending injury.

In January 2025, he returned to Finland and joined Helsinki Seagulls. They went on to win the Finnish championship title.

In October 2025, Kantonen joined Kataja, finishing second in the league.

In July 2026, he joined Romanian team Argeș Pitești.

== National team ==
Kantonen has played 15 youth international games with Finland U20.

Since 2018, he has been part of the Finland men's national basketball team, representing his country in the EuroBasket 2022 and the 2023 FIBA World Cup.

== Career statistics ==
=== National team ===
Team	Tournament	Pos.	GP	PPG	RPG	APG
Finland	EuroBasket 2022	7th	7	3.6	2.3	2.0
Finland	2023 FIBA World Cup	21st	5	0.8	0.6	0.2
