= Topias Palmi =

Finnish basketball player (born 1994)

Tampereen Pyrintö
- Position: Shooting guard / small forward
- League: Korisliiga

Personal information
- Born: 26 August 1994 (age 32) Tampere, Finland
- Listed height: 1.96 m (6 ft 5 in)
- Listed weight: 91 kg (201 lb)

Career information
- NBA draft: 2016: undrafted
- Playing career: 2011–present

Career history
- 2011–2018: Tampereen Pyrintö
- 2018–2019: Kataja
- 2019–2021: Vanoli Cremona
- 2021: Tampereen Pyrintö
- 2021–2022: Limburg United
- 2022–2023: SCM U Craiova
- 2023–2024: Karhu Basket
- 2024–2025: Tampereen Pyrintö
- 2025: Real Sebastiani Rieti
- 2025–present: Tampereen Pyrintö

Career highlights
- Belgian Cup winner (2022); Finnish Korisliiga champion (2014); 2x Korisliiga MVP (2019, 2024); Korisliiga Most Improved Player (2017)

Topias Palmi (born 26 August 1994) is a Finnish professional basketball player who plays for Tampereen Pyrintö of the Finnish Korisliiga.

== Professional career ==
On 27 June 2019 he signed a multi-year deal with Vanoli Cremona of the LBA.

After the Vanoli Cremona financial difficulties at the end of 2019–20 season that put the entire club into bankruptcy risk, Palmi was the only player who was confirmed for the following 2020–21 season. However he parted way with Cremona four games before the natural conclusion of the competition in order to attend some medical scrutinies in Finland. Palmi joined Tampereen Pyrintö in 2021 and averaged 17.7 points, 4.2 rebounds, and 2.4 assists per game. On 9 December 2021 Palmi signed with Limburg United of the BNXT League.

In the 2022–23 season, Palmi played in Romanian Liga Națională for SCM U Craiova, along with fellow Finnish player Shawn Hopkins.

In August 2023, he returned to Finland and signed with powerhouse Kauhajoki Karhu Basket on a one-year deal. Palmi was named the Korisliiga Player of the Month in December 2023. He was named the MVP of the 2023–24 Korisliiga season with the averages of 17.0 points, 4.1 rebounds and 1.2 assists.

He returned to his former club Tampereen Pyrintö for the 2024–25 season, with a contract including a foreign transfer release clause.

== National team ==
In 2013 FIBA Europe Under-20 Championship Division B game against Luxembourg, Palmi scored 60 points and broke the old record of any Finnish national basketball team with 17 points margin.

Palmi represented Finland senior national team in the EuroBasket 2022.

== Personal life ==
Palmi is in a relationship with Finnish hurdler Reetta Hurske.

== Career statistics ==
=== National team ===
Team	Tournament	Pos.	GP	PPG	RPG	APG
Finland	EuroBasket 2022	7th	4	3.0	1.3	0.8

== Trophies and awards ==
- Finnish Championship 2014
- Finnish Cup 2013
- Baltic Basketball League: fourth 2014
- Belgian Cup 2022
