= Paul Carter (basketball) =

American basketball player (born 1987)

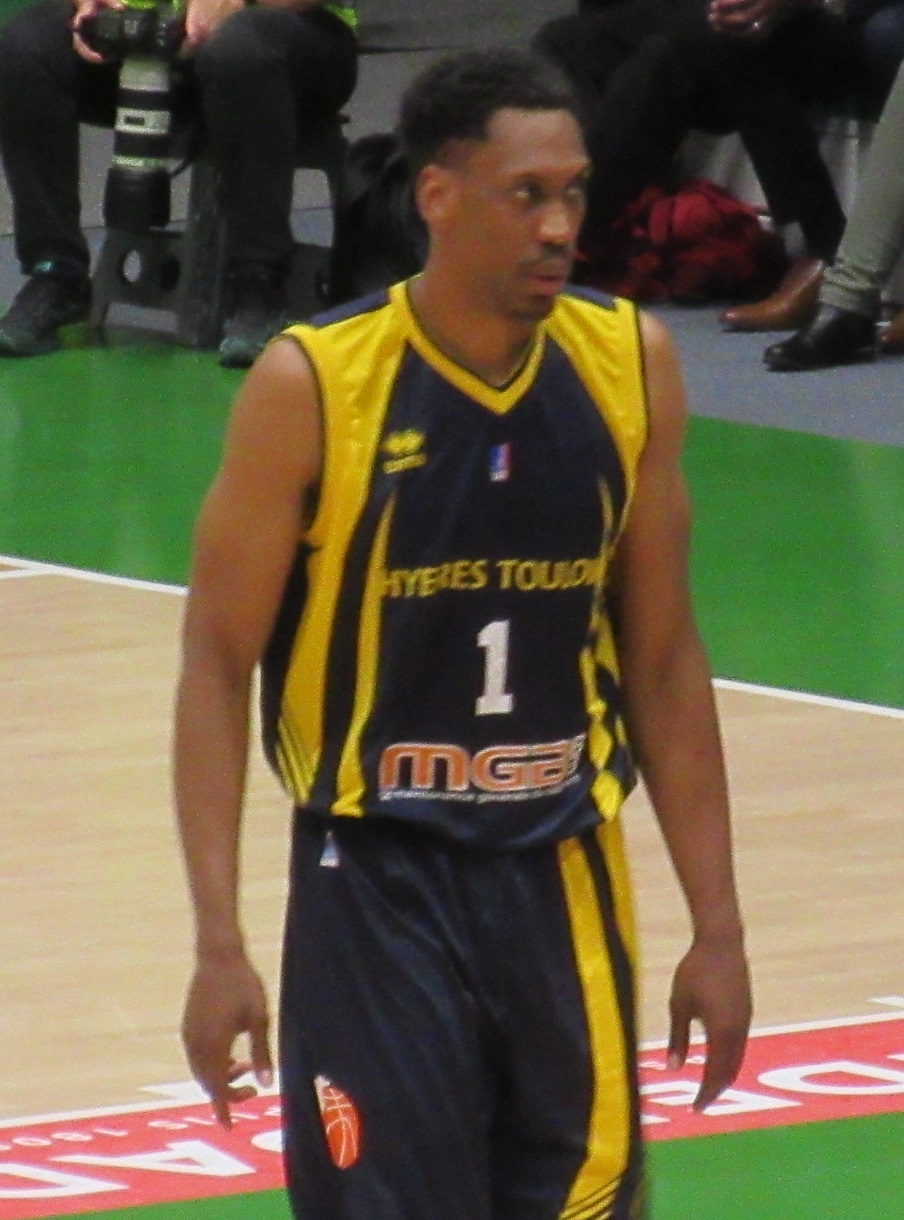
- Carter with Hyères-Toulon in 2017

Personal information
- Born: June 2, 1987 (age 39) Los Angeles, California, U.S.
- Listed height: 6 ft 8 in (2.03 m)
- Listed weight: 200 lb (91 kg)

Career information
- High school: Mills (Little Rock, Arkansas)
- College: Missouri State–West Plains (2007–2008); Minnesota (2008–2010); UIC (2010–2011)
- NBA draft: 2011: undrafted
- Playing career: 2011–2022
- Position: Power forward

Career history
- 2011: Proteas EKA AEL
- 2011–2012: Idaho Stampede
- 2012: Fuerza Guinda de Nogales
- 2012: Idaho Stampede
- 2012–2013: Springfield Armor
- 2014: Elitzur Ashkelon
- 2014–2015: Korikobrat
- 2015–2016: Antibes Sharks
- 2016: Alba Berlin
- 2016–2017: New Zealand Breakers
- 2017: Hyères-Toulon
- 2017: Champagne Châlons-Reims
- 2018: VEF Rīga
- 2018–2019: Limburg United
- 2019–2020: Saint-Chamond
- 2021–2022: STB Le Havre

Career highlights
- Horizon League All-Newcomer Team (2011)

Paul Mazique Carter (born June 2, 1987) is an American former professional basketball player. He played college basketball for the Minnesota Golden Gophers and UIC Flames.

== Early life and high school career ==
Carter was born on June 2, 1987, in Los Angeles, California. His father, Ron, played two seasons in the National Basketball Association (NBA) for the Los Angeles Lakers and Indiana Pacers. Carter played high school basketball in Los Angeles until he relocated to New Orleans, Louisiana, for his senior season. When Hurricane Katrina hit, he moved again to Arkansas and graduated from Mills High School in Little Rock.

== College career ==
Carter was to begin his college basketball career at Connors State College but transferred due to a head coaching change. He instead commenced his career at Missouri State University–West Plains during the 2007–08 season. He debuted with a 1-for-12 shooting performance due to playing with a sports hernia that then sidelined him for a month. Carter averaged 12 points and 9 rebounds in his one season at West Plains.

Carter was spotted by Minnesota Golden Gophers head coach Tubby Smith while playing at a summer camp in Tulsa, Oklahoma. Carter was so impressed by Smith and the Golden Gophers that he did not make a visit to the campus before he committed to the program. Carter was initially academically ineligible to transfer to Minnesota and practiced alone on the West Plains campus until he passed additional classes prior to the 2008–09 season. He joined the Golden Gophers in August 2008. Carter scored a career-high 22 points in a game against the Indiana Hoosiers on February 10, 2009. He averaged 5.3 points and a team-high 4.5 rebounds per game.

In December 2009, Carter began considering a transfer from Minnesota when his younger sister, who lived in Chicago, was diagnosed with osteosarcoma. He wanted to be close to her during her chemotherapy and considered colleges in the Chicago area. Carter and his teammates shaved their heads to honor his sister during a February 19, 2010, game against the Wisconsin Badgers. Carter averaged 6.3 points and 3.7 rebounds per game in his junior season.

On May 6, 2010, the UIC Flames announced that Carter had transferred to the program. Smith called Carter "the heart and soul of our basketball team" and believed that he would become the leader of the Flames. UIC were granted a hardship waiver that made Carter immediately eligible for the 2010–11 season. He set a new career-high in points with 24 against the Roosevelt Lakers on November 15, 2010, and then matched it six days later during a game against the Rhode Island Rams. Carter started 30 of 31 games and averaged 14.7 points, 8 rebounds and 1.9 assists per game during his only season with the Flames. He was named to the Horizon League All-Newcomer Team.

== Professional career ==
Carter worked out with the Utah Jazz, Golden State Warriors, Minnesota Timberwolves and Milwaukee Bucks of the National Basketball Association (NBA) prior to the 2011 NBA draft but went undrafted.

Carter began his career in Cyprus with Proteas EKA AEL. On December 13, 2011, he signed with the Utah Jazz. The confirmation of his signing was delayed while FIBA verified Carter held no contractual obligations that would stop him from playing in the NBA. Jazz head coach Tyrone Corbin considered Carter to be a "tremendous athlete" and wanted to experiment with him as a small forward instead of his natural power forward. He was waived by the Jazz on December 21, 2011. On December 28, 2011, Carter signed with the Idaho Stampede of the NBA D-League. He was waived by the Stampede for personal reasons on March 11, 2012, but was reacquired three days later. Carter averaged 10.8 points and 5.4 rebounds in 34 games played.

Carter returned to the Stampede for the 2012–13 season. His role dwindled as he averaged 3.0 points and 2.7 rebounds in nine games. On January 2, 2013, Carter was traded to the Santa Cruz Warriors for Carlon Brown and a fourth round pick in the 2013 NBA D-League draft. On January 7, 2013, he was traded to the Springfield Armor with a fifth round pick in the 2013 NBA D-League draft for Shawn Taggart.

Carter signed with Elitzur Ashkelon of the Liga Leumit in January 2014. He averaged 15.1 points and 7.5 rebounds in eight games played until his departure in February 2014.

Carter played for Korikobrat during the 2014–15 season and led the league in rebounds per game with 12.5. He also ranked second in points per game with 19.6. On August 5, 2015, Carter signed with the Antibes Sharks of the LNB Pro A. He averaged 10.2 points and 4.9 rebounds per game.

Carter signed a three-month contract with Alba Berlin of the Basketball Bundesliga on September 12, 2016, while the team suffered a player shortage due to injuries. On December 28, 2016, Carter signed with the New Zealand Breakers of the Australian National Basketball League as an injury replacement for Corey Webster. The move united him with good friend Akil Mitchell, who had encouraged Carter to play in New Zealand. He averaged 9.1 points and 4.5 rebounds in 11 games played. At the conclusion of the NBL season, he signed with Hyeres-Toulon of the LNB Pro A on February 26, 2017.

Carter signed with Champagne Châlons-Reims Basket of the LNB Pro A on August 13, 2017. He left the team to join VEF Rīga in February 2018.

Carter signed with Limburg United of the Pro Basketball League on June 23, 2018. On September 30, 2019, he joined Saint-Chamond of the LNB Pro B. Carter averaged 14.5 points and 6.4 rebounds per game. Chamond-Basket expressed a desire to resign Carter for the 2020–21 season but were concerned about quarantine issues related to the COVID-19 pandemic as he travelled between France and the United States. On July 2, 2021, Carter signed with STB Le Havre of the LNB Pro B.
