= Tuukka Kotti =

Finnish basketball player (born 1981)

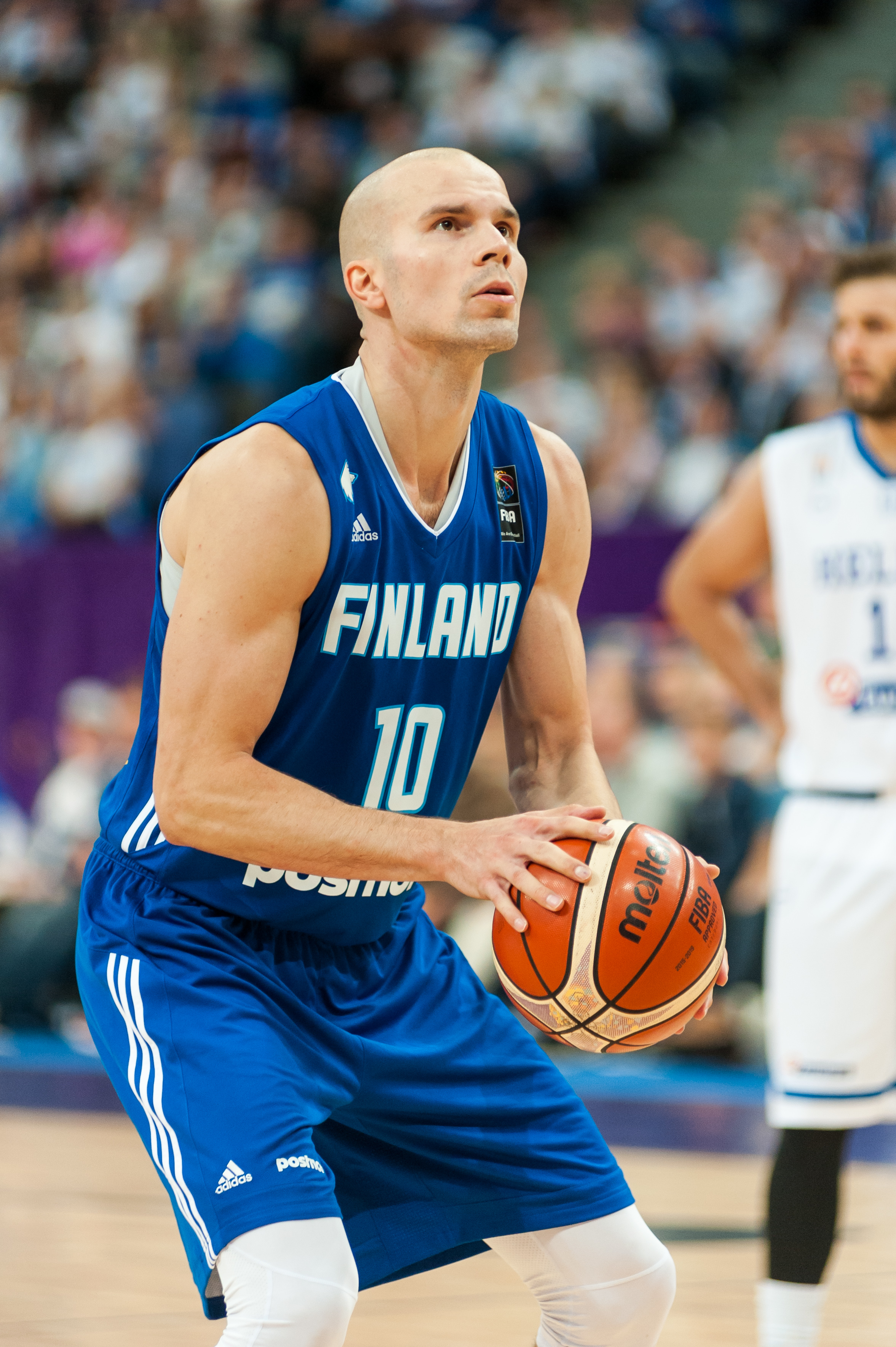
- Kotti during EuroBasket 2017

No. 11 – Tapiolan Honka
- Position: Center / power forward
- League: Korisliiga

Personal information
- Born: March 18, 1981 (age 45) Forssa, Finland
- Listed height: 2.05 m (6 ft 9 in)
- Listed weight: 102 kg (225 lb)

Career information
- College: Providence (2001–2005)
- NBA draft: 2005: undrafted
- Playing career: 1997–present

Career history
- 1997–1999: Forssan Koripojat
- 1999–2000: Vilpas Vikings
- 2005–2007: Castelletto Ticino
- 2007–2008: NSB Rieti
- 2008–2009: Brest
- 2009–2010: Espoon Honka
- 2010–2011: Ferrara
- 2011–2012: Andrea Costa Imola
- 2012–2013: Vanoli Cremona
- 2013–2016: Bisons Loimaa
- 2016–2017: Crailsheim Merlins
- 2017–2022: Helsinki Seagulls
- 2022–present: Tapiolan Honka

Career highlights
- Korisliiga Most Valuable Player (2018)

Tuukka Kotti (born 18 March 1981) is a Finnish professional basketball player for the Tapiolan Honka.

Kotti attended Providence College in the United States, where he played college basketball between 2001 and 2005. He left Finland as a point guard, but gradually turned into a center during his college career.

In 2018, Kotti was named the Korisliiga Most Valuable Player at age 37, while playing with Helsinki Seagulls.

== Career statistics ==
Legend
GP	Games played	GS	Games started	MPG	Minutes per game
FG%	Field goal percentage	3P%	3-point field goal percentage	FT%	Free throw percentage
RPG	Rebounds per game	APG	Assists per game	SPG	Steals per game
BPG	Blocks per game	PPG	Points per game	**Bold**	Career high

=== National team ===
Team	Tournament	Pos.	GP	PPG	RPG	APG
Finland	EuroBasket 2011	9th	8	7.8	6.3	1.1
Finland	EuroBasket 2013	9th	8	7.1	5.9	1.0
Finland	2014 FIBA World Cup	22nd	5	4.6	3.0	0.8
Finland	EuroBasket 2015	16th	6	4.3	3.5	1.2
Finland	EuroBasket 2017	11th	4	6.3	2.8	0.5

=== EuroCup ===
Year	Team	GP	GS	MPG	FG%	3P%	FT%	RPG	APG	SPG	BPG	PPG	PIR
2013–14	Bisons Loimaa	10	10	26.8	.549	-	.409	5.1	1.9	1.0	0.4	10.9	10.0
