= Juwan Staten =

American basketball player (born 1992)

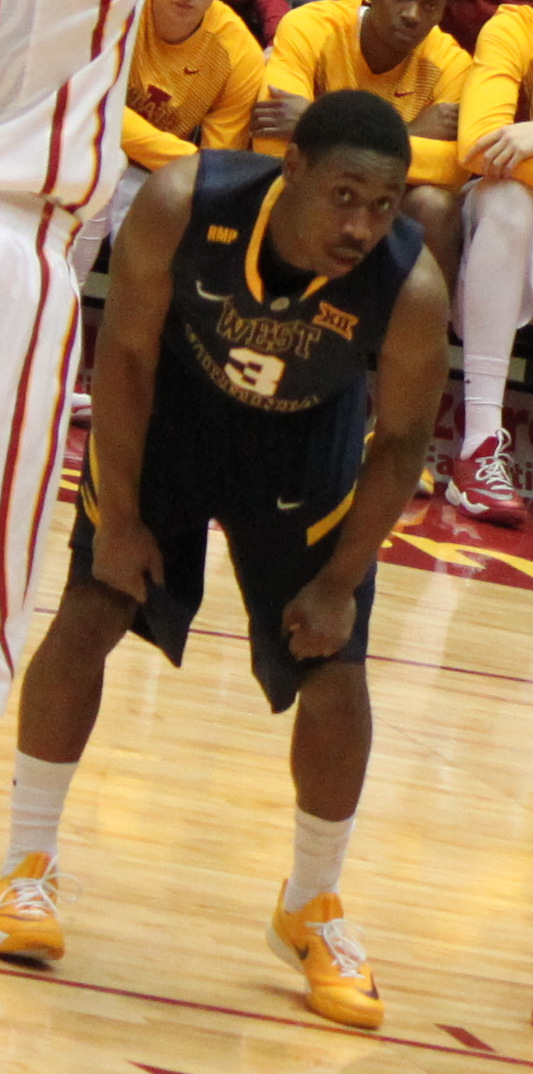
- Staten playing for West Virginia

Personal information
- Born: May 21, 1992 (age 34) Dayton, Ohio
- Listed height: 6 ft 1 in (1.85 m)
- Listed weight: 190 lb (86 kg)

Career information
- High school: Thurgood Marshall (Dayton, Ohio); Oak Hill Academy (Mouth of Wilson, Virginia)
- College: Dayton (2010–2011); West Virginia (2012–2015)
- NBA draft: 2015: undrafted
- Playing career: 2015–2022
- Position: Point guard

Career history
- 2015: Santa Cruz Warriors
- 2015–2016: Delaware 87ers
- 2016: Belfius Mons-Hainaut
- 2016–2017: Salon Vilpas Vikings
- 2017–2018: Saint-Chamond
- 2018–2019: Helsinki Seagulls
- 2019–2021: Jászberényi KSE
- 2022: Maine Celtics

Career highlights
- Finnish League Foreign MVP (2017); 2× First-team All-Big 12 (2014, 2015); Big 12 All-Defensive Team (2014); Atlantic 10 All-Rookie team (2011)
- Stats at Basketball Reference

Juwan Marquez Staten (born May 21, 1992) is an American former professional basketball player. He played for his hometown school, the University of Dayton, through his freshman year at college. Staten later led West Virginia in points, assists, field goal percentage, and steals during the 2013–14 season.

== High school career ==
Staten was known as one of the better athletes coming out of Oak Hill Academy, a school that is famed for producing several excellent basketball players. He helped the Warriors claim the best ranking in the state with a perfect undefeated home record. During his junior year, Staten represented Thurgood Marshall High School, whom he also led to an exceptional record along with tremendous success in the state tournament. At the end of his years in high school, the Ohio native was approached by several different schools around the country including Xavier, Purdue, Dayton, and Cincinnati.

College recruiting
Name	Hometown	School	Height	Weight	Commit date
Juwan Staten; PG	Dayton	Oak Hill Academy	5 ft 11 in (1.80 m)	170 lb (77 kg)	Feb 27, 2008
Juwan Staten; PG	Recruit ratings: Scout: Rivals: 247Sports: ESPN:				

== College career ==
As a freshman at Dayton in 2010–11, Staten led the conference in assists. The Flyers finished the regular season with a winning record and reached the finals through the Atlantic 10 tournament.

In 2011, Staten transferred to West Virginia and subsequently sat out the 2011–12 season due to the NCAA transfer rules.

"You're talking about a 6-foot point guard and he's one of the top 15 rebounders in the league. What more do you want him to do?"

— Coach Bob Huggins on Juwan Staten

His first season with Bob Huggins and the West Virginia Mountaineers resulted in his least successful year up till then. Staten started 21 of thirty-one season contests. Perhaps his most considerable moment was when the point guard made a game-winning shot against Virginia Tech with about five seconds on the clock.

Staten's junior season drew attention of the media immediately. He led the team under about every "point guard" category and proved to be an excellent rebounder as well. The Ohio native earned prestigious conference honors with West Virginia, such as the Big 12 First Team and the Big 12 All-Defensive Team in 2014. At the conclusion of the year, Staten averaged 18.1 points, 5.9 assists, and 5.6 rebounds, making him one of the nation's top point guards statistically. As a senior in 2014–15, he averaged 14.2 points and 4.6 assists in 30 games.

== Professional career ==
=== Santa Cruz Warriors (2015) ===
After going undrafted in the 2015 NBA draft, Staten joined the Sacramento Kings for the 2015 NBA Summer League. He managed just one game for the Kings due to left knee soreness. On September 25, 2015, Staten signed with the Golden State Warriors. However, he was later waived by the Warriors on October 16 after appearing in one preseason game. On November 2, he was acquired by the Santa Cruz Warriors of the NBA Development League as an affiliate player of Golden State. Staten played in 13 games for Santa Cruz, where he averaged 8.9 points and 3.7 assists in 29 minutes per game.

=== Delaware 87ers (2015–2016) ===
On December 31, he was traded to the Delaware 87ers in exchange for a 2016 fifth-round pick. On February 23, he was waived by Delaware.

=== Belfius Mons-Hainaut (2016) ===
On March 29, he was reacquired by the 87ers, however, he left the team on April 5 and signed with Belfius Mons-Hainaut of the Belgian League.

=== Vilpas Vikings (2016–2017) ===
For the 2016–17 season, he joined Vilpas Vikings of the Finnish Korisliiga. Staten and the Vikings ended the season as runners-up of the Korisliiga, losing to Kataja BC in the Finals. Staten was named the league's Most Valuable Foreign Player, after averaging 13.3 points and 4.3 assists per game over the season.

=== Saint-Chamond (2017–2018) ===
For the 2017–2018 season, he joined Saint-Chamond of the French LNB Pro B. He reached the playoffs with the team. During the season he played an average of 27 minutes for 11.2 points, 2 rebounds and 3.6 assists per game.

=== Maine Celtics (2022) ===
On January 14, 2022, Staten was acquired via available player pool by the Maine Celtics of the NBA G League. He was then later waived on January 21, 2022.

== Personal life ==
Staten was born on May 21, 1992, in Dayton, Ohio to Billy and Cecilia Staten. He was known as a successful academic student in his years at the University of Dayton and West Virginia University, making the Garrett Ford Academic Honor Roll and the Big 12 Commissioner's Honor Roll.
