= Fiifi Aidoo =

Finnish basketball player

No. 55 – Kauhajoki Karhu
- Position: Point guard
- League: Korisliiga

Personal information
- Born: 5 April 1996 (age 30) Accra, Ghana
- Listed height: 1.89 m (6 ft 2 in)

Career information
- College: Grand Canyon (2016-2018)
- NBA draft: 2019: undrafted
- Playing career: 2012–present

Career history
- 2012-2016: HBA-Märsky
- 2018-2019: Ura Basket
- 2019-2020: Kataja BC
- 2020: Kobrat
- 2020–2021: CB Benicarló
- 2022–2023: Fyllingen
- 2023: Grengewald Hostert
- 2023–2025: BC Nokia
- 2025–present: Kauhajoki Karhu

Career highlights
- Finnish Korisliiga champion (2024)

Harold Aidoo Fiifi (born 5 April 1996) is a Ghanaian-Finnish professional basketball player for Kauhajoki Karhu of the Korisliiga.

== Personal ==
Aidoo was born in Accra, Ghana but moved to Helsinki, Finland at age 5.

== College career ==
As a member of Grand Canyon State University's basketball team Aidoo played under former NBA All-Star Dan Majerle. On 7 December 2016 he scored his then-college career high 15 points when he shot 3 of 5 three pointers, 2 of them late in the game at a 76–72 victory against San Diego State.

== Professional career ==
Aidoo started out his career at HBA-Märsky where he played from 2012 to 2016. During the 2018–19 Korisliiga season, he played for Ura Basket. In 2019, Aidoo represented Joensuu's Kataja Basket and later joined the team's competitor Kobrat of the Korisliiga. With Kobrat, he averaged 9.0 points, 3.1 rebounds and 3.4 assists.

In 2020, he moved to CB Benicarlo in Spain on a one-year contract.

For the 2023–24 season, he returned to Finland and signed with BC Nokia. In 2024, he was crowned the Korisliiga champion with Nokia.

On June 5, 2025, he signed with Kauhajoki Karhu of the Korisliiga.

== National team career ==
Aidoo has been a member of Finland's national basketball team.
