= Severi Kaukiainen =

Finnish basketball player (born 1998)

No. 11 – Kortrijk Spurs
- Position: Point guard
- League: BNXT League

Personal information
- Born: 11 May 1998 (age 28) Kotka, Finland
- Listed height: 1.86 m (6 ft 1 in)
- Listed weight: 84 kg (185 lb)

Career information
- Playing career: 2015–present

Career history
- 2015–2017: KTP Basket
- 2017–2021: Kouvot
- 2021–2023: Kauhajoki Karhu
- 2023: Patrioti Levice
- 2023–2026: Kalev
- 2026–present: Kortrijk Spurs

Career highlights
- 2× Estonian League champion (2024, 2025); 2× Estonian Cup winner (2024, 2025); Estonian League Finals MVP (2025); 2× Estonian Cup MVP (2024, 2025); Finnish Korisliiga champion (2022); Korisliiga MVP (2023); 2x Korisliiga Sixth Man of the Year (2022, 2023)

Severi Tino Kalevi Kaukiainen (born 11 May 1998) is a Finnish professional basketball player for the Kortrijk Spurs of the BNXT League. He has represented the Finnish national team in international matches.

== Professional career ==
Born in Kotka, Kaukiainen started playing basketball in his home town local club Peli-Karhut and the youth sector of KTP Basket, and continued his senior career with the same club in 2015.

During 2017–2021, he played for a fellow Korisliiga team Kouvot in neighbouring town Kouvola. In 2019, Kouvot won the silver medal as they finished 2nd in the league.

Kaukianen won the Finnish championship title with Karhu Basket in 2022, and silver medal in 2023. At the end of the 2022–23 season, Kaukiainen was named the Korisliiga Most Valuable Player and Korisliiga Sixth Man of the Year at the same time.

In the summer 2023, he signed with Slovak champions Patrioti Levice. He terminated his contract with the club on 1 December 2023, after Levice were knocked out of the FIBA Europe Cup in group stage.

On 3 December 2023, Kaukiainen signed with Estonian side Kalev/Cramo, competing in Korvpalli Meistriliiga and Latvian–Estonian Basketball League. On 18 February 2024, Kaukianen and Kalev/Cramo won the 2024 Estonian Cup title, by beating Tartu Ülikool 76–68 in the final. Kaukiainen was named the MVP with his 21-point performance. On 28 May 2024, Kaukiainen and Kalev/Cramo were crowned the Estonian champions, after winning Tartu Ülikool in the finals with 3–0 wins. On 11 July 2024, Kaukiainen extended his deal with Kalev/Cramo for the 2024–25 season. Next season Kaukiainen and Kalev repeated as Estonian champions and Estonian Cup champions. Kaukiainen was named the KML Finals MVP and the Cup MVP.

On September 9, 2026, he signed with Kortrijk Spurs in the BNXT League.

== National team ==
A former youth international, Kaukiainen has represented Finland men's national basketball team.
