= 2016–17 Korisliiga season =

2016–17 Korisliiga
- Season: 2016–17
- Teams: 10

Regular season
- Top seed: Salon Vilpas

Finals
- Champions: Kataja (2nd title)
- Runners-up: Salon Vilpas
- Third place: Helsinki Seagulls
- Fourth place: Kauhajoki Karhu
- Finals MVP: (Finland) Teemu Rannikko

Awards
- Finnish MVP: (Finland) Antto Nikkarinen
- Foreign MVP: (United States) Juwan Staten

Statistical leaders
Points	(United States) Jamal Jones	21.5
Rebounds	(United States) Marcus Van	10.5
Assists	(Finland) Antto Nikkarinen	7.3

The 2016–17 Korisliiga season is the 77th season of the top professional basketball league in Finland. The season started on October 5, 2016, and ended on May 13, 2017. Kataja Basket won its second national title after beating Salon Vilpas in the Finals.

== Teams ==
Location of teams in the 2015–16 Korisliiga

Bisons Loimaa left the league after the 2015–16 season, because of its financial problems. Korihait was promoted from the second tier First Division after winning the championship there.

Team	City	Arena
Helsinki Seagulls	Helsinki	Töölö Sports Hall
Kataja	Joensuu	Joensuu Areena
Kauhajoki	Kauhajoki	Kauhajoen Yhteiskoulu
Kobrat	Lapua	Lapuan Urheilutalo
Korihait	Uusikaupunki	Pohitullin palloiluhalli
Kouvot	Kouvola	Mansikka-Ahon Urheiluhalli
KTP	Kotka	Steveco-Areena
Nokia	Nokia	Nokian Palloiluhalli
Salon Vilpas	Vilpas	Salohalli
Tampereen Pyrintö	Tampere	Pyynikin Palloiluhalli

== Regular season ==
=== Standings ===
Pos	Team	Pld	W	L	PF	PA	PD	Pts	Qualification or relegation
1	Salon Vilpas	36	28	8	3073	2819	+254	56	Qualification for the playoffs
2	Kataja	36	25	11	3113	2811	+302	50	Qualification for the playoffs
3	Helsinki Seagulls	36	25	11	2937	2858	+79	50	Qualification for the playoffs
4	Kauhajoki	36	21	15	3086	3024	+62	42	Qualification for the playoffs
5	Kobrat	36	17	19	2990	2931	+59	34	Qualification for the playoffs
6	Kouvot	36	16	20	2956	3020	−64	32	Qualification for the playoffs
7	Nokia	36	16	20	2868	2947	−79	32	Qualification for the playoffs
8	Tampereen Pyrintö	36	14	22	2865	2947	−82	28	Qualification for the playoffs
9	KTP	36	13	23	2847	2999	−152	26	
10	Korihait	36	5	31	2683	3062	−379	10	

Source: Korisliiga

== Playoffs ==
Playoffs were played between the eight teams of the competition, with a best-of-five series in quarterfinals a best-of-seven series in semifinals and finals and the bronze medal series as a single game.

Quarterfinals
1	Salon Vilpas	3
8	Tampereen Pyrintö	0
4	Kauhajoki	3
5	Kobrat	1
(Pairings are reseeded after the first round)
2	Kataja	3
7	Nokia	1
3	Helsinki Seagulls	3
6	Kouvot	1

Semifinals
1	Salon Vilpas	4
4	Kauhajoki	3
2	Kataja	4
3	Helsinki Seagulls	1

Finals
1	Salon Vilpas	2
2	Kataja	4

Third place
3	Helsinki Seagulls	93
4	Kauhajoki	77

== Attendance ==
Included playoffs games.

Pos	Team	Total	High	Low	Average	Change
1	Salon Vilpas	47,347	2,352	1,010	1,754	+37.6%
2	Kataja	36,477	3,901	694	1,403	+29.5%
3	Kouvot	22,987	2,193	931	1,149	−7.3%
4	Helsinki Seagulls	21,904	1,226	630	952	−6.0%
5	Kauhajoen Karhu	21,669	1,398	627	942	+8.7%
6	KTP	16,609	1,175	798	923	−7.4%
7	Tampereen Pyrintö	17,020	1,102	657	896	+3.3%
8	Korihait	13,409	1,157	430	745	n/a^{1}
9	Nokia	14,395	1,068	484	720	−2.8%
10	Kobrat	13,910	972	517	696	+11.0%
	League total	225,727	3,901	430	1,055	+12.5%

Updated to games played on 13 May 2017
Source: Korisliiga
Notes:
1: Korihait played in the First Division last season.
