= Cameron Jones (basketball) =

American basketball player (born 1989)

Personal information
- Born: May 4, 1989 (age 37) Fort Lewis, Washington, U.S.
- Listed height: 6 ft 4 in (1.93 m)
- Listed weight: 185 lb (84 kg)

Career information
- High school: Los Alamitos (Los Alamitos, California)
- College: Northern Arizona (2007–2011)
- NBA draft: 2011: undrafted
- Playing career: 2011–2023
- Position: Shooting guard

Career history
- 2011–2012: Fort Wayne Mad Ants
- 2012–2014: Santa Cruz Warriors
- 2014–2015: Zenit Saint Petersburg
- 2015–2016: Ironi Nes Ziona
- 2016: Arkadikos
- 2016–2017: Santa Cruz Warriors
- 2017: Canton Charge
- 2017–2018: Kymis
- 2018–2019: Lavrio
- 2019–2020: Karhu Basket
- 2020–2021: Cherkaski Mavpy
- 2021–2023: Karhu Basket

Career highlights
- 2× Finnish League champion (2019, 2022); 2× Finnish League Finals MVP (2019, 2022); Korisliiga Foreign MVP (2022); NBA D-League Most Improved Player (2013); 2× First-team All-Big Sky (2010, 2011); Second-team All-Big Sky (2009)
- Stats at Basketball Reference

Cameron Scott Jones (born May 4, 1989) is an American former professional basketball player. He played college basketball for the Northern Arizona Lumberjacks.

== High school career ==
Jones attended Los Alamitos High School in Los Alamitos, California. He helped Los Alamitos to a 29–5 record in 2006–07 and led his team to the CIF Southern California Regional Division I first round. He averaged a team-best 18.1 points per game and 3.6 rebounds, shooting 54 percent from the field and 81 percent from the line. He was also named to the 2007 All-CIF first team and the Sunset League Most Valuable Player.

== College career ==
In his freshman season at Northern Arizona, Jones had a minor role and limited minutes. In 31 games (one start), he averaged 3.9 points, 1.6 rebounds and 2.1 assists per game.

In his sophomore season, he had a breakout season, going on to be named to the 2009 All-Big Sky second team and received the Joe Rolle Most Valuable Player Award at the team's end of season banquet. In 27 games (23 starts), he averaged 12.7 points, 2.6 rebounds, 2.8 assists and 1.2 steals per game.

In his junior season, he again increased his play and production going on to be named to the 2010 All-Big Sky first team and again received the Joe Rolle Most Valuable Player Award at the team's end of season banquet. He was also named to the West Coast Classic All-Tournament team. In 28 games (all starts), he averaged 19.3 points, 4.6 rebounds, 2.8 assists and 1.3 steals in 35.2 minutes per game.

In his senior season, he scored 640 points on the season, breaking the school record set by Kyle Landry in 2007–08 of 561. He became the first player in school history to score 500 or more points twice and fourth overall to reach 500 points in a season, and set single season marks for fields goals (623), field goal attempts (1,296), minutes played (1,045). He was named to his second All-Big Sky first team and to the 2011 Big Sky All-Tournament team. In 32 games (all starts), he averaged 20.1 points, 4.6 rebounds and 3.2 assists in 33.7 minutes per game.

== Professional career ==
=== 2011–12 season ===
Jones went undrafted in the 2011 NBA draft. On November 3, 2011, he was selected by the Fort Wayne Mad Ants with the 10th overall pick in the 2011 NBA Development League Draft.

On December 10, 2011, Jones signed with the Miami Heat. However, he was later waived by the Heat on December 14, and subsequently returned to the Mad Ants two days later. In 48 games for the Mad Ants in 2011–12, Jones averaged 14.0 points, 2.6 rebounds and 1.9 assists per game.

=== 2012–13 season ===
On October 29, 2012, Jones was reacquired by the Fort Wayne Mad Ants. On November 2, 2012, he was traded to the Santa Cruz Warriors. In 56 games for Santa Cruz in 2012–13, he averaged 12.1 points, 2.9 rebounds, 2.4 assists and 1.2 steals per game.

=== 2013–14 season ===
In July 2013, Jones joined the Golden State Warriors for the 2013 NBA Summer League. On September 23, 2013, he signed with Golden State. However, he was later waived by Golden State on October 9, 2013. In November 2013, he was reacquired by the Santa Cruz Warriors. In 56 games for Santa Cruz in 2013–14, he averaged 20.2 points, 4.4 rebounds, 3.5 assists and 1.3 steals per game.

=== 2014–15 season ===
In July 2014, Jones joined the Orlando Magic for the 2014 NBA Summer League. On September 6, 2014, he signed with Zenit Saint Petersburg of Russia for the 2014–15 season. In 33 league games for Petersburg, he averaged 8.6 points, 3.1 rebounds and 2.1 assists per game.

=== 2015–16 season ===
On September 2, 2015, Jones signed a one-year deal with Ironi Nes Ziona of the Israeli League. On January 20, 2016, he parted ways with Ironi Nes Ziona. In 15 games for Ironi, he averaged 8.1 points, 2.4 rebounds, 2.3 assists and 1.1 steals per game. On February 1, 2016, he signed with Arkadikos of Greece for the rest of the 2015–16 Greek Basket League season. He appeared in 10 games for Arkadikos, averaging 15.6 points, 4.4 rebounds, 3.3 assists and 1.0 steals per game.

=== 2016–17 season ===
On September 16, 2016, Jones signed with the Golden State Warriors. However, he was later waived by the Warriors on October 20 after appearing in five preseason games. On October 31, 2016, he was acquired by the Santa Cruz Warriors of the NBA Development League as an affiliate player of Golden State. On February 25, 2017, he was traded to the Canton Charge.

=== 2017–18 season ===
On July 26, 2017, Jones signed with Kymis of the Greek Basket League.

=== 2018–19 season ===
Jones played with Lavrio of the Greek Basket League.

He later played for Kauhajoen Karhu of Korisliiga. He averaged 16.8 points, 2.8 rebounds, 4.5 assists and 1.8 steals per game in four Champions League games. He also averaged 16.2 points, 4.3 boards, 5.6 assists and 1.4 steals per contest in 34 Finnish League games.

=== 2019–20 season ===
He played another season for Karhu.

=== 2020–21 season ===
He played for Cherkaski Mavpy of the Ukrainian Basketball SuperLeague.

=== 2021–22 season ===
On August 16, 2021, Jones returned to Kauhajoki Karhu Basket.

== Personal ==
Jones is the son of Timothy Jones and Patricia Lewis, and has one older sister, Taryn, and two younger brothers, Samuel and Timothy. He is married to actress, Theresa Moriarty.
