= Shawn Hopkins =

Finnish-American basketball player (born 1995)

No. 11 – Pyrintö
- Position: Small forward / shooting guard
- League: Korisliiga

Personal information
- Born: May 9, 1995 (age 31) Nokia, Finland
- Listed height: 1.95 m (6 ft 5 in)
- Listed weight: 95 kg (209 lb)

Career information
- College: Troy (2015–2018); North Georgia (2018–2019)
- Playing career: 2011–present

Career history
- 2011–2015: BC Nokia
- 2019–2020: BC Nokia
- 2020–2021: Tampereen Pyrintö
- 2021–2022: Stjarnan
- 2022–2023: SCM U Craiova
- 2023–2024: Kauhajoki Karhu
- 2024–2025: Helsinki Seagulls
- 2025: Álftanes
- 2026–present: Tampereen Pyrintö

Career highlights
- Finnish Korisliiga champion (2025); Icelandic Cup winner (2022); Korisliiga Most Improved Player (2021)

Shawn Dominique Hopkins (born 9 May 1995) is a Finnish professional basketball player for Tampereen Pyrintö of the Korisliiga. In 2025, he won the Finnish national championship with Helsinki Seagulls and earlier in 2022, he won the Icelandic national Cup with Stjarnan.

== Career ==
Hopkins started his senior career with BC Nokia in 2011. During 2015–2019, he played college basketball with Troy Trojans and North Georgia Nighthawks. He returned to Nokia for the 2019–20 Korisliiga season.

He played one season with Tampereen Pyrintö and was named the Korisliiga Most Improved Player in 2021. Then he joined Stjarnan in Icelandic Úrvalsdeild karla, where they won the Icelandic Cup in 2022.

For the 2022–23 season, Hopkins joined SCM U Craiova in Romanian Liga Națională, along with fellow countryman Topias Palmi.

In 2023, he returned to Finland and joined Kauhajoki Karhu Basket, winning the domestic bronze medal. He averaged 7.5 points and 2.5 rebounds.

In June 2024, Hopkins signed for Helsinki Seagulls, winning the Finnish championship title in 2025, while he averaged 9.8 points, 3.7 rebounds and 1.3 assists for the season.

In July 2025, he signed with Álftanes. He appeared in 10 games for Álftanes, averaging 9.8 points, before leaving the club in December.

== National team career ==
Hopkins has played over 80 games for Finland youth national teams.

He debuted with the Finland men's national basketball team in 2016.

== Personal life ==
Hopkins was born in Nokia, Finland, to a Finnish mother and an American father. His father Garcia Hopkins is a former professional basketball player who was drafted by Washington Bullets in the 1979 NBA draft and later played in Finland for a long time. His American spouse Lynsey Kelly is a former football player who has played in Finnish women's top-tier Kansallinen Liiga for Ilves. The couple had met earlier in 2017 in the United States. They are married and have a daughter.
