= 2015–16 Korisliiga season =

2015–16 Korisliiga
- Season: 2015–16
- Duration: October 3, 2015 – May 11, 2016
- Teams: 10

Regular season
- Top seed: Kataja
- Relegated: Kobrat (10th)

Finals
- Champions: Kouvot (4th title)
- Runners-up: Tampereen Pyrintö
- Third place: Nokia
- Fourth place: Helsinki Seagulls
- Finals MVP: (United States) D.J. Richardson

Awards
- Domestic MVP: (Finland) Teemu Rannikko
- Foreign MVP: (United States) D.J. Richardson

Statistical leaders
Points	(United States) Lamont Jones	20.2
Rebounds	(United States) Damon Williams	9.3
Assists	(Finland) Teemu Rannikko	9.7

Records
- Highest attendance: 3,034; Helsinki Seagulls 70–82 Bisons (4 October 2015)
- Lowest attendance: 417; Kobrat 81–85 Bisons (26 March 2016)

The 2015–16 Korisliiga season was the 76th season of the top professional basketball league in Finland. The season started on October 3, 2015 and ended May 11, 2016. Kouvot won its fourth national championship this season.

== Teams ==
Location of teams in the 2015–16 Korisliiga

Namika Lahti left the league after the 2014–15 season, because of a bankruptcy. BC Nokia was promoted from the second tier First Division after winning the championship there.

Team	City	Arena
Nokia ◆	Nokia	Nokian Palloiluhalli
Nilan Bisons	Loimaa	Energia Areena
Kataja ●	Joensuu	Joensuu Areena
Kouvot	Kouvola	Mansikka-Ahon Urheiluhalli
Kauhajoki	Kauhajoki	Kauhajoen Yhteiskoulu
Tampereen Pyrintö	Tampere	Pyynikin Palloiluhalli
KTP	Kotka	Steveco-Areena
Kobrat	Lapua	Lapuan Urheilutalo
Helsinki Seagulls	Helsinki	Töölö Sports Hall
Salon Vilpas Vikings	Vilpas	Salohalli

Notes

◆ Team makes its debut in the Korisliiga.
● Defending champions, winners of the 2014–15 Korisliiga season.

=== Standings ===
Pos	Team	Pld	W	L	PF	PA	PD	Pts	Qualification
1	Kataja	36	29	7	3250	2872	+378	58	Advance to the playoffs
2	Kauhajoki	36	21	15	2958	2916	+42	42	Advance to the playoffs
3	Kouvot	36	21	15	3093	2932	+161	42	Advance to the playoffs
4	Tampereen Pyrintö	36	19	17	2930	2903	+27	38	Advance to the playoffs
5	Bisons Loimaa	36	19	17	2740	2878	−138	38	Advance to the playoffs
6	Salon Vilpas Vikings	36	17	19	2855	2820	+35	34	Advance to the playoffs
7	Helsinki Seagulls	36	16	20	2782	2795	−13	32	Advance to the playoffs
8	Nokia	36	14	22	2958	3013	−55	28	Advance to the playoffs
9	KTP	36	13	23	2909	3093	−184	26	
10	Kobrat	36	11	25	2905	3158	−253	22	Relegated to First Division

Source: Korisliiga

== Playoffs ==
Quarterfinals
1	Kataja	1
8	Nokia	3
4	Tampereen Pyrintö	3
5	Bisons Loimaa	1
(Pairings are reseeded after the first round)
2	Kauhajoki	2
7	Helsinki Seagulls	3
3	Kouvot	3
6	Salon Vilpas	2

Semifinals
3	Kouvot	4
8	Nokia	2
4	Tampereen Pyrintö	4
7	Helsinki Seagulls	3

Finals
3	Kouvot	4
4	Tampereen Pyrintö	1

Third place
7	Helsinki Seagulls	66
8	Nokia	69

=== Quarterfinals ===
Home court advantage	Agg.	Home court disadvantage	Game 1	Game 2	Game 3	Game 4	Game 5
Kataja	1–3	Nokia	88–94	79–85	99–69	72–75	
Kauhajoki	2–3	Helsinki Seagulls	94–61	43–69	88–78	66–94	80–82
Tampereen Pyrintö	3–1	Bisons Loimaa	100–89	76–80	91–78	81–64	
Kouvot	3–2	Salon Vilpas	73–54	63–106	76–58	74–76	85–83

=== Semifinals ===
Home court advantage	Agg.	Home court disadvantage	Game 1	Game 2	Game 3	Game 4	Game 5	Game 6	Game 7
Kouvot	4–2	Nokia	99–67	82–86	95–76	74–80	81–66	93–68	
Tampereen Pyrintö	4–3	Helsinki Seagulls	70–48	59–79	97–72	61–71	72–54	69–71 (OT)	74–65

=== Finals ===
Home court advantage	Agg.	Home court disadvantage	Game 1	Game 2	Game 3	Game 4	Game 5	Game 6	Game 7
Kouvot	4–1	Tampereen Pyrintö	91–89	82–69	68–79	72–56	100–76		

== Attendance ==
Included only regular season games.

Pos	Team	Total	High	Low	Average	Change
1	Salon Vilpas	21,861	1,860	905	1,275	+31.4%
2	Kouvot	21,845	1,573	1,018	1,239	+14.7%
3	Kataja BC	18,691	1,787	734	1,083	−11.7%
4	Helsinki Seagulls	18,019	3,034	630	1,013	−7.9%
5	KTP	17,947	1,342	870	997	−10.0%
6	Tampereen Pyrintö	17,091	1,427	729	867	−11.6%
7	Kauhajoen Karhu	15,196	1,405	676	867	−1.0%
8	Bisons Loimaa	14,429	1,132	574	804	−19.1%
9	Nokia	12,649	1,182	524	741	n/a^{1}
10	Kobrat	11,284	1,026	417	627	+0.2%
	League total	169,012	3,034	417	938	n/a

Source: Korisliiga
Notes:
1: BC Nokia played in the First Division last season.
