= René Rougeau =

American basketball player (born 1986)

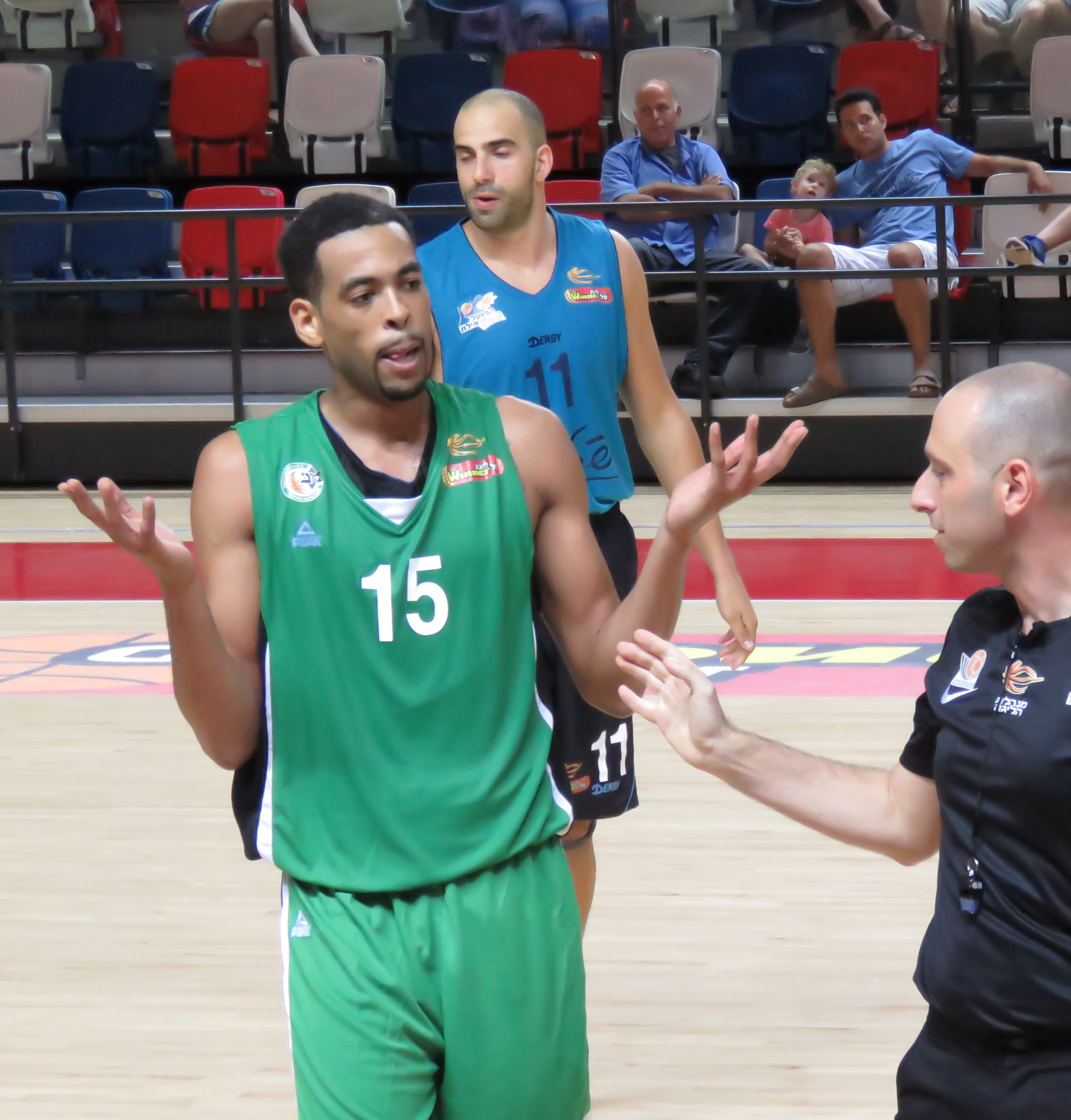
- Rougeau with Maccabi Haifa in 2015

No. 24 – Canterbury Rams
- Position: Small forward
- League: NZNBL

Personal information
- Born: March 25, 1986 (age 40) Sacramento, California, U.S.
- Listed height: 6 ft 6 in (1.98 m)
- Listed weight: 210 lb (95 kg)

Career information
- High school: Etiwanda (Rancho Cucamonga, California)
- College: UNLV (2005–2009)
- NBA draft: 2009: undrafted
- Playing career: 2009–present

Career history
- 2009: Nevada Pride
- 2009: Clayton Showtime
- 2010: Southland Sharks
- 2010–2014: Toros de Nuevo Laredo
- 2011–2012: Caballeros de Culiacán
- 2013: Mineros de Cananea
- 2013: Venice Beach Warriors
- 2014: Bucaneros de La Guaira
- 2014: Caballeros de Culiacán
- 2014–2016: Maccabi Haifa
- 2016–2017: Toros de Nuevo Laredo
- 2017: Caballeros de Culiacán
- 2017–2019: Kauhajoen Karhu
- 2019–2021: Hermine Nantes Basket
- 2021–2022: Kauhajoen Karhu
- 2022–: Helsinki Seagulls
- 2026: Canterbury Rams

Career highlights
- 5× Korisliiga champion (2018, 2019, 2022, 2023, 2025); 2× Korisliiga Finals MVP (2023, 2025); 2× Korisliiga Foreign MVP (2019, 2025); 2× LNBP champion (2011, 2013); NZNBL All-Star Five (2010); Third-team All-MWC (2009); MWC All-Defensive Team (2009)

René Anthony Rougeau (born March 25, 1986) is an American professional basketball player for the Canterbury Rams of the New Zealand National Basketball League (NZNBL). He played college basketball for the UNLV Runnin' Rebels before playing professionally New Zealand, Mexico, Venezuela, Israel, Finland and France. He has won two Mexican LNBP championships and five Finnish Korisliiga championships.

== Early life ==
Rougeau was born in Sacramento, California. He graduated from Etiwanda High School in Rancho Cucamonga, California, in 2004, where he averaged 6.0 points and 5.0 rebounds per game his senior season.

== College career ==
After redshirting the 2004–05 season, Rougeau debuted for the UNLV Runnin' Rebels in the 2005–06 season. He appeared in 13 of UNLV's 30 games as a freshman and averaged 2.2 points and 2.2 rebounds per game in 9.5 minutes per game.

As a sophomore in 2006–07, Rougeau appeared in 25 of UNLV's 37 games and averaged 1.5 points and 1.0 rebounds in 4.9 minutes per game.

As a junior in 2007–08, Rougeau played in all 35 games and made 27 starts, averaging 9.0 points and a team-best 6.2 rebounds per game. He also averaged a team-high 2.14 steals per game, which was second in the Mountain West Conference (MWC). His 75 total steals was the seventh-highest single-season total in UNLV history and was the most in the MWC during the 2007–08 season. He scored a career-high 19 points in his first career start. For the season, he earned honorable mention All-MWC honors.

As a senior in 2008–09, Rougeau started all 32 games and averaged 10.9 points, 6.7 rebounds, 1.7 assists, 1.4 steals and 2.0 blocks in 29.8 minutes per game. He was subsequently named to the MWC All-Defensive Team and earned third-team All-MWC honors.

Listed as a guard in college, Rougeau went on to play as a forward as a professional.

== Professional career ==
=== Early years (2009–2010) ===
In 2009, Rougeau had a stint with the Nevada Pride of the International Basketball League and the Clayton Showtime of the American Basketball Association.

In February 2010, Rougeau signed with the Southland Sharks of the New Zealand National Basketball League (NZNBL) for the 2010 season, the team's inaugural season in the league. In 19 games, he averaged 16.2 points, 9.2 rebounds, 2.1 assists, 3.7 steals and 1.5 blocks per game. He was subsequently named to the New Zealand NBL All-Star Five.

=== Mexico and Israel (2010–2017) ===
Between 2010 and 2014, Rougeau played four seasons for Toros de Nuevo Laredo of the Liga Nacional de Baloncesto Profesional (LNBP). During the LNBP off-seasons, he remained in Mexico and played in the Circuito de Baloncesto de la Costa del Pacífico (CIBACOPA) for Caballeros de Culiacán (2011, 2012 and 2014) and Mineros de Cananea (2013).

Rougeau had a stint with the Venice Beach Warriors of the West Coast Pro Basketball League (WCBL) in 2013 and a stint for Bucaneros de La Guaira of the Venezuelan Liga Profesional de Baloncesto in 2014.

On July 3, 2014, Rougeau signed a two-year deal with Maccabi Haifa of the Israeli Basketball Premier League.

Rougeau returned to Mexico for the 2016–17 season, playing a fifth season with Toros de Nuevo Laredo of the LNBP. He then played a fourth season with Caballeros de Culiacán of the CIBACOPA in 2017.

=== Finland and France (2017–present) ===
For the 2017–18 season, Rougeau joined Kauhajoen Karhu of the Finnish Korisliiga. He played a second season with Kauhajoen Karhu in 2018–19 and won the Korisliiga Foreign MVP.

For the 2019–20 season, Rougeau joined Hermine Nantes Basket of the French LNB Pro B. He returned to Nantes for a second season in 2020–21.

For the 2021–22 season, Rougeau re-joined Kauhajoen Karhu.

Rougeau continued in the Korisliiga in 2022–23 with Helsinki Seagulls. He went on to play for Helsinki Seagulls in 2023–24, 2024–25 and 2025–26.

On May 16, 2026, Rougeau signed with the Canterbury Rams of the New Zealand NBL for the rest of the 2026 season, returning to the league for a second stint and first since 2010.

== Personal life ==
Rougeau is the son of Debra and Glenn Rougeau. He has two brothers and three sisters.

Rougeau is a devout Christian. As of 2010, his pre-game routine was reading the Bible in the locker room.
