= Samuel Haanpää =

Finnish basketball player (born 1986)

Free agent
- Position: Forward

Personal information
- Born: September 27, 1986 (age 39) Kerava, Finland
- Listed height: 6 ft 7 in (2.01 m)
- Listed weight: 216 lb (98 kg)

Career information
- High school: Cornerstone Christian School (San Antonio, Texas)
- College: Valparaiso (2006–2008)
- Playing career: 2008–present

Career history
- 2008–2009: Fos Ouest Provence
- 2009–2010: Torpan Pojat
- 2010–2011: Palencia
- 2011: Keravnos
- 2012: Kataja
- 2012–2013: Korikobrat
- 2013–2014: Coruña
- 2014–2015: Borås
- 2015–2016: KTP
- 2016–2017: Obras Sanitarias
- 2017–2018: Espoo United

Career highlights
- Korisliiga MVP (2013)

Samuel Hannes Haanpää (born 27 September 1986) is a Finnish professional basketball player. Standing at 2.01 m (6 ft 7 in), he usually plays as forward.

Born in Kerava, Haanpää attended Valparaiso University in the United States, where he played college basketball between 2006 and 2008. After graduating from college, Haanpää has played for several professional clubs around Europe.

== Career statistics ==
=== National team ===
Team	Tournament	Pos.	GP	PPG	RPG	APG
Finland	EuroBasket 2013	9th	8	3.5	1.9	0.6
