= Vesa Vertio =

Finnish basketball coach (born 1983)

BC Rytas
- Position: Assistant coach
- League: LKL

Personal information
- Born: 5 March 1983 (age 43) Helsinki, Finland
- Listed height: 1.85 m (6 ft 1 in)
- Coaching career: 2007–present

Career history

Playing
- 2002–2003: Torpan Pojat

Coaching
- 2007–2016: Tapiolan Honka (assistant)
- 2016–2019: Crailsheim Merlins (assistant)
- 2019–2023: Helsinki Seagulls (assistant)
- 2023–2025: Helsinki Seagulls
- 2025–present: Rytas Vilnius (assistant)

Career highlights
- As head coach: Finnish Korisliiga champion: (2025); As assistant coach: FIBA Champions League champion (2026)

Vesa Vertio (born 5 March 1983) is a Finnish professional basketball coach, currently working as assistant coach of Rytas Vilnius in Lithuanian Basketball League (LKL).

== Career ==
After a short playing career, Vertio started coaching the youth teams of Espoon Honka and later Tapiolan Honka. Since 2007, he worked also as the first team's assistant coach.

Between 2016 and 2019, Vertio worked as assistant coach of Crailsheim Merlins in German ProA and the Basketball Bundesliga in a coaching staff of Tuomas Iisalo, whom he had met earlier in Honka.

In 2019, he returned to Finland and joined Korisliiga team Helsinki Seagulls, and was named the team's head coach in 2023. At the end of his first season as head coach, they finished 2nd in the league, and one year later Vertio guided Seagulls to win the club's second Finnish championship title.

In July 2025, Vertio moved to Lithuania and started as lead assistant coach of LKL club Rytas Vilnius.

== Personal life ==
His brothers Timo and Panu Vertio are former basketball players.
