= Remu Raitanen =

Finnish basketball player (born 1997)

No. 7 – KTP-Basket
- Position: Small forward / power forward
- League: Korisliiga

Personal information
- Born: August 21, 1997 (age 29) Helsinki, Finland
- Listed height: 2.06 m (6 ft 9 in)
- Listed weight: 90 kg (198 lb)

Career information
- High school: Helsinki Basketball Academy, (Helsinki, Finland)
- College: San Francisco (2016–2020)
- NBA draft: 2020: undrafted
- Playing career: 2014–present

Career history
- 2014–2016: HBA-Märsky
- 2020–2021: Kobrat
- 2021–2022: KTP Basket
- 2022–2023: Albacete
- 2023–2024: Cáceres
- 2024: Prievidza
- 2024–2025: Keflavík
- 2025–present: KTP Basket

Career highlights
- Korisliiga MVP (2022)

Remu Raitanen (born 21 August 1997) is a Finnish professional basketball player for KTP-Basket in Korisliiga. Raitanen started playing basketball in youth teams of Torpan Pojat, continuing his senior career in 2014 with Helsinki Basketball Academy team HBA-Märsky, competing in Finnish second-tier Koripallon I-divisioona.

== College career ==
On 11 May 2016, Raitanen verbally committed to the San Francisco Dons of the West Coast Conference (WCC).

== Professional career ==
On 19 August 2020, Raitanen returned to Finland and signed a professional contract with Korisliiga team Kobrat.

After playing with Kobrat, Raitanen signed with KTP Basket for the 2021–22 season. He was named the Korisliiga MVP in 2022.

For the 2022–23 season, Raitanen moved to Spain and joined LEB Oro team Albacete.

On 11 August 2023, Raitanen signed with fellow LEB Oro club Cáceres.

On 21 July 2024, Raitanen joined BC Prievidza in Slovak Basketball League and Alpe Adria Cup for the 2024–25 season.

In November 2024, Raitanen signed with Keflavík of the Icelandic Úrvalsdeild karla.

== International career ==
A former youth international, Raitanen has played over 20 games for Finland senior national team.

== Personal life ==
His father Jari Raitanen is also a former professional basketball player who has won four Finnish championship titles and represented Finland national team.

== Career statistics ==
Legend
GP	Games played	GS	Games started	MPG	Minutes per game
FG%	Field goal percentage	3P%	3-point field goal percentage	FT%	Free throw percentage
RPG	Rebounds per game	APG	Assists per game	SPG	Steals per game
BPG	Blocks per game	PPG	Points per game	**Bold**	Career high

=== College ===
Year	Team	GP	GS	MPG	FG%	3P%	FT%	RPG	APG	SPG	BPG	PPG
2016–17	San Francisco	33	3	**19.2**	.402	.321	.526	**3.6**	.7	**.4**	.1	4.5
2017–18	San Francisco	33	3	14.5	.322	.278	.818	2.5	.5	.3	.1	3.7
2018–19	San Francisco	28	1	9.9	**.463**	.364	.824	1.7	**.8**	.3	.1	3.3
2019–20	San Francisco	**34**	**5**	16.4	.424	**.380**	**.861**	3.3	**.8**	**.4**	**.2**	**5.1**
Career		128	12	15.2	.396	.334	.742	2.8	.7	.3	.1	4.2
