= Saint-Chamond Basket =

Saint-Chamond
- Leagues: Pro B
- Founded: 1973; 52 years ago
- History: Saint-Chamond Basket (1973–present)
- Arena: Halle André Boulloche
- Capacity: 1,300
- Location: Saint-Chamond, France
- President: Roger Paour
- Head coach: Alain Thinet
- Website: www.saint-chamond-basket.com

Saint-Chamond Basket is a professional basketball club based in Saint-Chamond, France. The team currently plays in the Pro B, the second highest professional division in France. The team plays its home games at the Halle André Boulloche, which has a capacity of 1,300 people.

== Players ==
Note: Flags indicate national team eligibility at FIBA-sanctioned events. Players may hold other non-FIBA nationalities not displayed.

Criteria

To appear in this section a player must have either:

- Set a club record or won an individual award while at the club
- Played at least one official international match for their national team at any time
- Played at least one official NBA match at any time.

- (Tunisia) Omar Abada
- (United States) Juwan Staten
- (Finland) Ilari Seppälä
