= 2020–21 Korisliiga season =

Korisliiga
- Season: 2020–21
- Duration: 13 October 2020 – 14 May 2021
- Teams: 12

Regular season
- Relegated: -

Finals
- Champions: Vilpas Vikings; 1st title
- Runners-up: Kauhajoki
- Third place: Helsinki Seagulls
- Fourth place: Pyrintö

The 2020–21 Korisliiga season was the 81st season of the top professional basketball league in Finland. Vilpas Vikings won its first-ever national championship.

== Format ==
The twelve teams would play two times against each one of the other teams for a total of 22 games. Then league splits into two groups (one with the first 6 teams and the other with the last 6 teams) and each team plays two games against each one of the teams from the same group (for a total of 10 games). The six teams from the first group and the best two teams from the second group would join the playoffs. The last team would be directly relegated.

== Teams ==
Location of teams in the 2020–21 Korisliiga

No teams promoted, nor relegated.

Team	City	Arena
Helsinki Seagulls	Helsinki	Töölö Sports Hall
Kataja	Joensuu	LähiTapiola Areena
Karhu	Kauhajoki	Kauhajoen Yhteiskoulu
Kobrat	Lapua	Lapuan Urheilutalo
Korihait	Uusikaupunki	Pohitullin Sports Hall
Kouvot	Kouvola	Mansikka-Ahon Urheiluhalli
KTP	Kotka	Steveco-Areena
Lahti	Lahti	Energia Areena
Nokia	Nokia	Nokian Palloiluhalli
Pyrintö	Tampere	Pyynikin Palloiluhalli
Salon Vilpas	Vilpas	Salohalli
Ura eGameStars	Kaarina	Kupittaan palloiluhalli

=== Regular season ===
Pos	Team	Pld	W	L	PF	PA	PD	Pts	Qualification
1	Helsinki Seagulls	22	20	2	2045	1764	+281	40	Qualification for the first group
2	Pyrintö	22	17	5	2172	2022	+150	34	Qualification for the first group
3	Karhu	22	17	5	2030	1795	+235	34	Qualification for the first group
4	Salon Vilpas	22	15	7	2001	1715	+286	30	Qualification for the first group
5	Lahti	22	12	10	2025	2003	+22	24	Qualification for the first group
6	Nokia	22	10	12	1870	1859	+11	20	Qualification for the first group
7	Kataja	22	10	12	2038	1991	+47	20	Qualification for the second group
8	Kobrat	22	10	12	2094	2070	+24	20	Qualification for the second group
9	KTP	22	10	12	1976	2034	−58	20	Qualification for the second group
10	Kouvot	22	6	16	1801	2038	−237	12	Qualification for the second group
11	Ura	22	3	19	1968	2187	−219	6	Qualification for the second group
12	Korihait	22	2	20	1699	2241	−542	4	Qualification for the second group

Updated to match(es) played on 08 March 2021. Source: Korisliiga
