= Kauhajoki Karhu Basket =

Karhu Basket
- Leagues: Korisliiga
- Founded: Kauhajoen Karhu 1910; 116 years ago Kauhajoki Karhu Basket 2017; 9 years ago
- Arena: IKH Areena
- Capacity: 3,500
- Location: Kauhajoki, Finland
- Team colors: Black, White and Orange
- President: Vesa Ojala
- Head coach: Janne Koskimies
- Korisliiga titles: 3 (2018, 2019, 2022)
- Website: www.karhubasket.fi
| Home | Away |

Kauhajoki Karhu Basket, is a Finnish professional basketball team from Kauhajoki. The team plays in Korisliiga, the highest tier of Finnish basketball.

In 2018, the club achieved their first Korisliiga title ever after defeating Salon Vilpas 4–2 in the finals. It successfully defended its title the next season to repeat as Finnish champions.

== Honours ==
- Korisliiga
  - Winners (3): 2017–18, 2018–19, 2021-22
  - Runners-up (3): 2020–21, 2022-23, 2024-25
  - 3rd place (1): 2023–24
  - Semifinals (3): 2012–13, 2014–15, 2016–17
- FIBA Europe Cup
  - Semifinals (1): 2022–23

== European record ==
| Season | Competition | Round | Club | Home | Away | Advanced |
|---|---|---|---|---|---|---|
| 2018–19 | Basketball Champions League | QR1 | (Romania) Oradea | 87–84 | 74–80 | Yes, +8 |
| 2018–19 | Basketball Champions League | QR2 | (Bulgaria) Lukoil Levski | 88–79 | 88–93 | Yes, +13 |
| 2018–19 | Basketball Champions League | QR3 | (France) Nanterre 92 | 54–91 | 91–58 | No, –70 |
| 2019–20 | Basketball Champions League | QR1 | (Belarus) Tsmoki Minsk | 93–86 | 68–67 | Yes, +6 |
| 2019–20 | Basketball Champions League | QR2 | (Poland) Polski Cukier Toruń | 93–82 | 70–58 | No, –1 |
| 2022–23 | Basketball Champions League | QR2 | (Slovakia) Patrioti Levice | 57–81 | | No |
| 2022–23 | FIBA Europe Cup | RS | (Hungary) Kormend | 77–62 | 89–90 | Yes |
| 2022–23 | FIBA Europe Cup | RS | (Poland) Anwil Wloclawek | 87–93 | 88–89 | Yes |
| 2022–23 | FIBA Europe Cup | RS | (Portugal) Sporting CP | 104–85 | 84–93 | Yes |
| 2022–23 | FIBA Europe Cup | RS2 | (Slovakia) Patrioti Levice | 105–71 | 55–86 | Yes |
| 2022–23 | FIBA Europe Cup | RS2 | (Ukraine) Budivelnyk | 65–62 | 65–72 | Yes |
| 2022–23 | FIBA Europe Cup | RS2 | (Israel) Hapoel Haifa | 85–76 | 59–66 | Yes |
| 2022–23 | FIBA Europe Cup | QF | (Portugal) FC Porto | 75–65 | 80–81 | Yes, +11 |
| 2022–23 | FIBA Europe Cup | SF | (Poland) Anwil Wloclawek | 63–67 | 90–71 | No, -23 |
| 2023–24 | Basketball Champions League | QR2 | (Israel) Ironi Ness Ziona | 56–92 | | No |
| 2023–24 | FIBA Europe Cup | RS | (Lithuania) CBet Jonava | 88–104 | 98–94 | No |
| 2023–24 | FIBA Europe Cup | RS | (Germany) Rostock Seawolves | 92–98 | 93–65 | No |
| 2023–24 | FIBA Europe Cup | RS | (Cyprus) AEK Larnaca | 80–85 | 66–75 | No |
| 2025–26 | Basketball Champions League | QR | (Lithuania) Juventus | 89–103 | | No |

== Players ==
Former Karhu primary logo

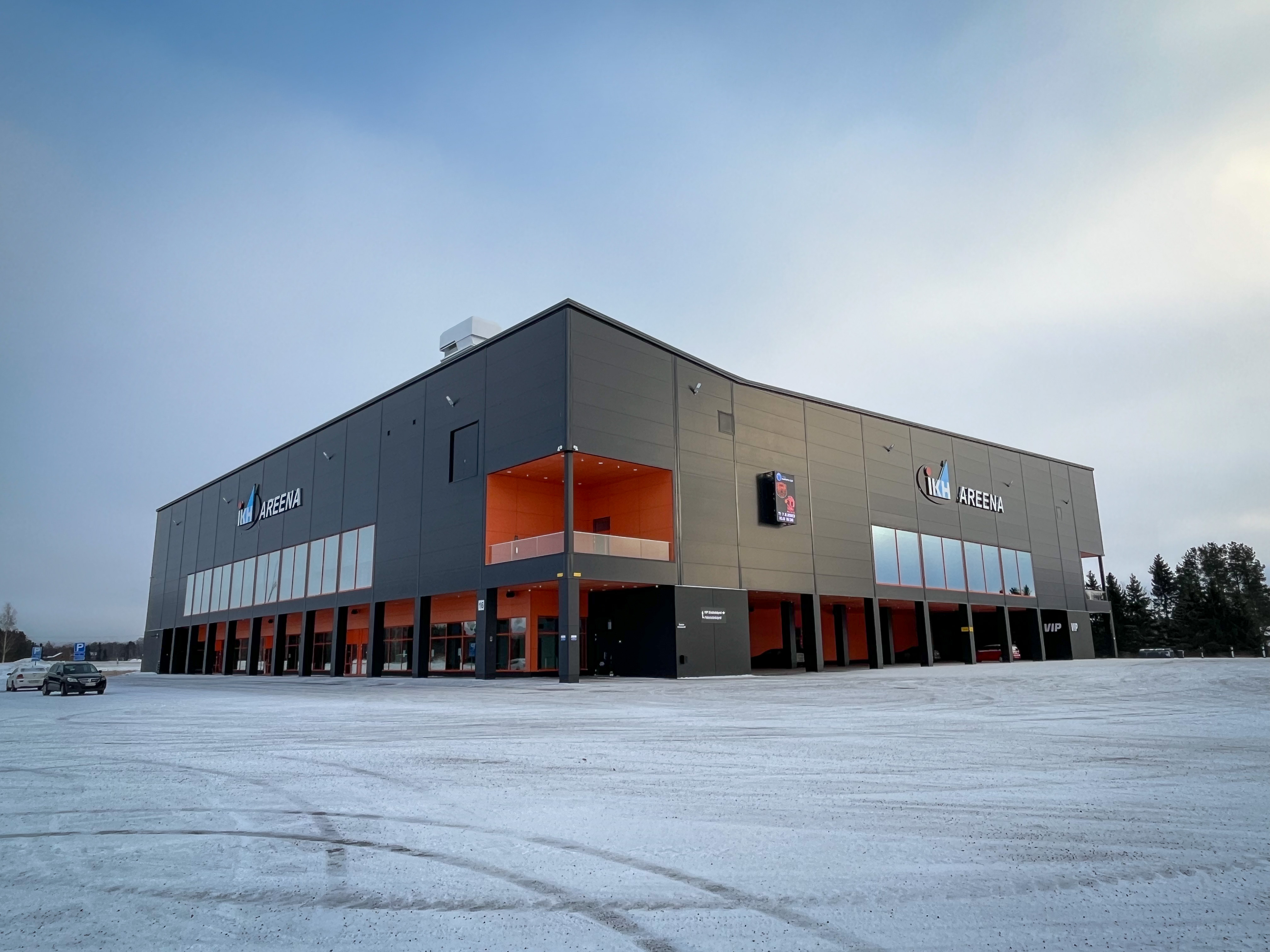
IKH Areena

=== Current roster ===
Kauhajoen Karhu roster
Players
Coaches

| Pos. | No. | Nat. | Name | Ht. | Age |
|---|---|---|---|---|---|
| F | 1 | (United States) | Flatten, Skyler | 1.98 m (6 ft 6 in) | 30 – 2 July 1995 |
| F | 3 | (Finland) | Boman, Hugo | 2.01 m (6 ft 7 in) | 24 – 26 March 2002 |
| F | 4 | (United States) | Nweke, Ike | 2.01 m (6 ft 7 in) | 26 – 15 May 2000 |
| G | 5 | (Finland) | Salmi, Juuso | 1.88 m (6 ft 2 in) | 22 – 5 March 2004 |
| F | 7 | (Finland) | Luukkonen, Eemi | 2.03 m (6 ft 8 in) | 23 – 18 December 2002 |
| F | 8 | (Finland) | Ahonen, Antti | 2.01 m (6 ft 7 in) | 25 – 15 March 2001 |
| F | 14 | (Finland) | Kanden, Oliver | 1.99 m (6 ft 6 in) | 21 – 11 August 2004 |
| G | 23 | (United States) | Berry, Ty | 1.91 m (6 ft 3 in) | 24 – 12 October 2001 |
| G | 25 | (Finland) | Koivunen, Kalle | 1.93 m (6 ft 4 in) | 23 – 11 September 2002 |
| F | 32 | (Finland) | Riihimäki, Aleksi | 2.00 m (6 ft 7 in) | 21 – 9 August 2004 |
| C | 35 | (Finland) | Laavainen, Aamos | 2.03 m (6 ft 8 in) | 23 – 6 June 2003 |
| G | 55 | (Finland) | Aidoo, Fiifi | 1.88 m (6 ft 2 in) | 30 – 5 April 1996 |

Head coach

- (Finland) Janne Koskimies

Assistant coach(es)

- (Finland) Risto-Matti Rousku

Legend

- (C) Team captain
- Injured

- Roster
Updated: 3 April 2026

=== Notable players ===
Note: Flags indicate national team eligibility at FIBA-sanctioned events. Players may hold other non-FIBA nationalities not displayed.

Criteria

To appear in this section a player must have either:

- Set a club record or won an individual award while at the club
- Played at least one official international match for their national team at any time
- Played at least one official NBA match at any time.

- (Finland) Daniel Dolenc 2022–2023
- (Finland) Shawn Hopkins 2023–2024
- (Finland) Andre Gustavson 2024–2025
- (Finland) Antti Kanervo 2014–2016
- (Finland) Henri Kantonen 2017–2018, 2021–2023
- (Finland) Severi Kaukiainen 2021–2023
- (Finland) Mikko Koivisto 2015–2016
- (Finland) Vesa Mäkäläinen 2010–2012
- (Finland) Topias Palmi 2023–2024
- (Norway) Kristian Sjolund 2023–2024
- (South Sudan) Kuany Kuany 2022–2023
- (South Sudan) Junior Madut 2023–2024
- (United States) Courtney Fortson 2023–2024
- (United States) Cameron Jones 2018–2020, 2021–2023
- (United States) René Rougeau 2017–2019, 2021–2022
- (United States) Eric Washington 2008–2009

=== Individual awards ===
Korisliiga Finals MVP

- Bojan Šarčević – 2018
- Cameron Jones – 2019, 2022

Korisliiga Defensive Player of the Year

- Vesa Mäkäläinen – 2011
- Henri Hirvikoski – 2013

Korisliiga Sixth Man of the Year

- Severi Kaukiainen - 2022, 2023

Korisliiga Most Valuable Player

- Okko Järvi - 2021
- Severi Kaukiainen - 2023
- Topias Palmi - 2024

Korisliiga Rookie of the Year

- Oliver Kanden - 2024
