= Helsinki Seagulls =

Finnish professional basketball club

- Nickname: Gulls
- Leagues: Korisliiga
- Founded: 2013; 13 years ago
- History: Helsinki Seagulls (2013–present)
- Arena: Töölö Sports Hall
- Capacity: 1,600
- Location: Helsinki, Finland
- Team colors: Navy, Gold, Black
- Head coach: Vesa Vertio
- Team captain: René Rougeau
- Ownership: Janne Kulvik; Sinikka Kulvik; Sami Hedberg
- Website: www.helsinkiseagulls.com
Home	Away

The Helsinki Seagulls are a professional basketball team, based in Helsinki, Finland. The club plays in the Korisliiga, the highest tier of basketball in Finland.

The Seagulls were founded in 2013 and made its debut in the Korisliiga in 2014, after promoting in its first season. The team has won the Finnish Cup three times. Seagulls won their first Korisliiga championship to date during the 2022–23 season.

== History ==
The team was established in 2013 and it acquired its place on the second level of Finnish basketball in Division I A after the dissolution of the Torpan Pojat men's team. The license of Torpan Pojat was then transferred to the Gulls, along with the remaining players.

The Seagulls opened their 2013–2014 season in the Division I A with winning 10 matches in a row. The team won a total of 25 of their 28 regular season games placing first in their division with Josh Gonner leading their offense with an impressive 20.5 points per game. Seagulls earned the promotion to Korisliiga after dismissing first Tampereen Pyrintö II and then BC Nokia in the division playoffs.

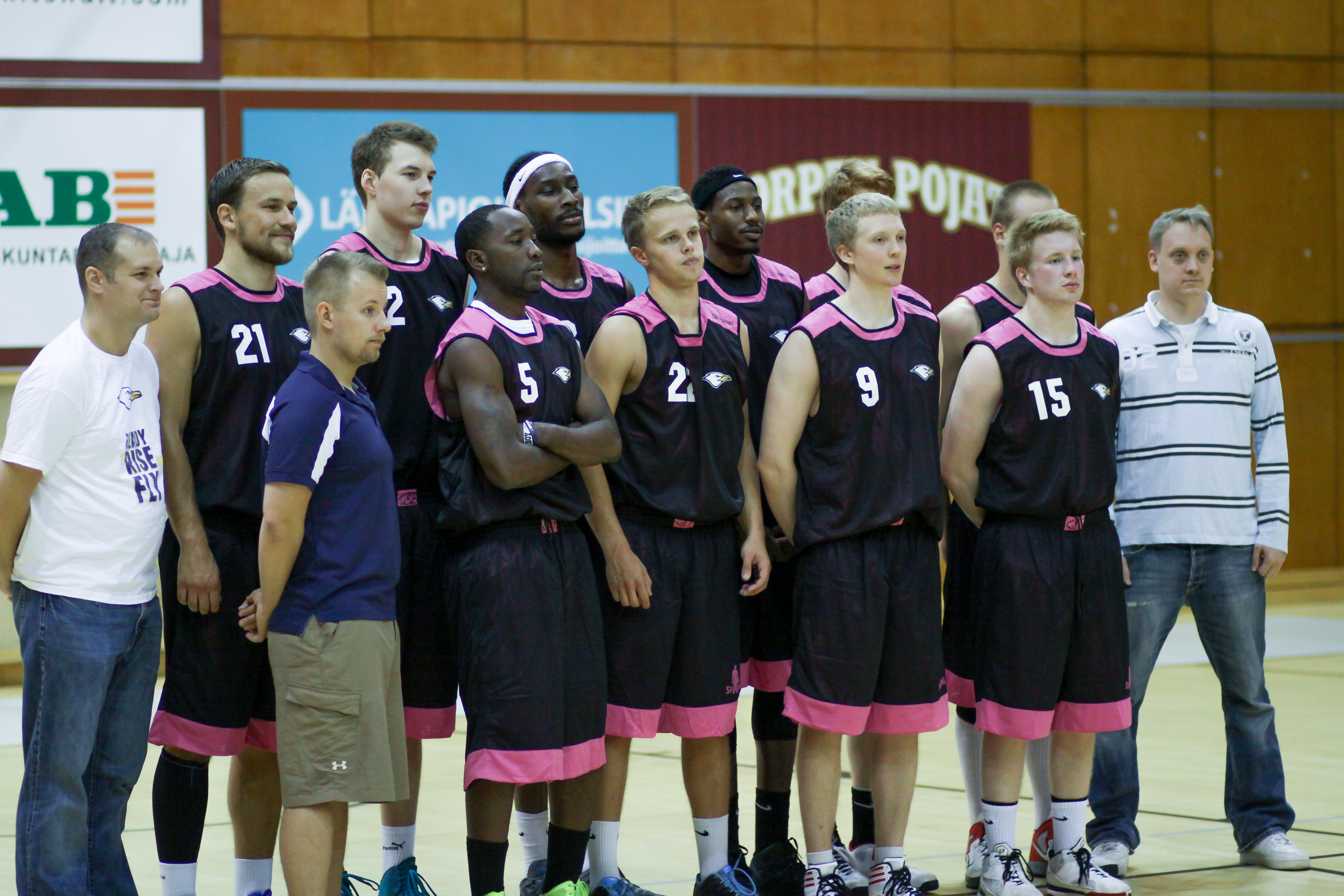
The first ever team picture of Helsinki Seagulls in September 2013.

Seagulls started the 2022–23 season with the strongest team to date, with Americans Rene Rougeau and Jeffrey Carroll Jr. adding to an already strong team. Seagulls finished the 2022–23 regular season with a record of 25–7, and in second place behind Kauhajoki. After dominant quarter and semifinal performances against BC Nokia and Kataja Basket respectively, they advanced to the final against the defending champions Kauhajoki Karhubasket, where the Seagulls claimed their first title; defeating Karhubasket 4–2.

== Honours ==
Korisliiga

- Winners (2): 2023, 2025
- Runners-up (1): 2024
- Third place (4): 2017, 2018, 2021, 2022

Finnish Cup

- Winners (4): 2020, 2021, 2022, 2024
- Runners-up (1): 2023

== Season by season ==
Season	Tier	League	Pos.	Finnish Cup
2013–14	2	First Division A	1st	
2014–15	1	Korisliiga	8th	
2015–16	1	Korisliiga	4th	
2016–17	1	Korisliiga	3rd	
2017–18	1	Korisliiga	3rd	
2018–19	1	Korisliiga	7th	
2019–20	1	Korisliiga	2nd	
2020–21	1	Korisliiga	3rd	
2021–22	1	Korisliiga	3rd	

== Arena ==
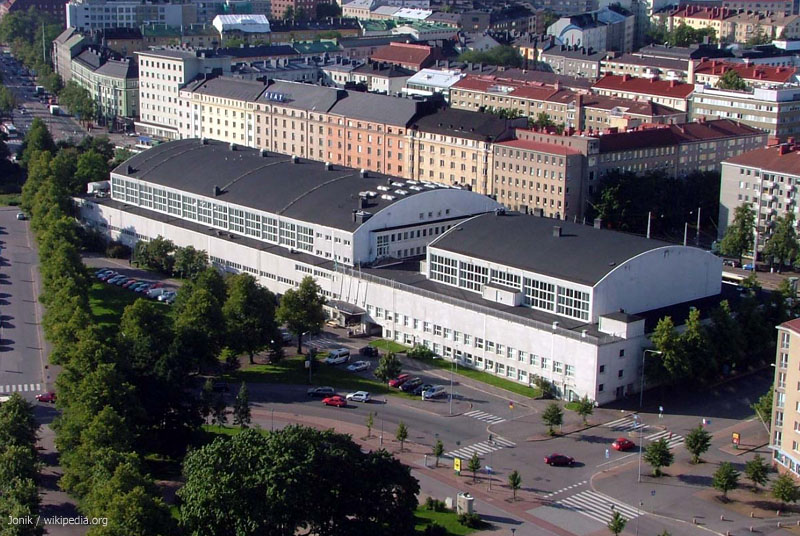
The Töölö Sports Hall

The Seagulls play their home games in the Töölö Sports Hall.

== Players ==
=== Current roster ===
Note: Flags indicate national team eligibility at FIBA-sanctioned events. Players may hold other non-FIBA nationalities not displayed.

Helsinki Seagulls roster
Players
Coaches

Pos.	No.	Nat.	Name	Ht.	Wt.	Age
G	00	(Finland)	Chukwuma, Chrysostom	1.90 m (6 ft 3 in)		29 – 12 June 1996
F	0	(Finland)	Mennander, Henri	2.04 m (6 ft 8 in)		22 – 7 October 2003
G	2	(Finland)	Niemi, Trey	1.87 m (6 ft 2 in)		27 – 21 March 1998
F	3	(United States)	Hollis, Curtis	1.98 m (6 ft 6 in)		27 – 25 April 1998
PF	4	(United States)	Rougeau, Rene	1.98 m (6 ft 6 in)		39 – 25 March 1986
F	5	(Finland)	Leskinen, Elias	1.99 m (6 ft 6 in)		24 – 1 January 2002
F	8	(Finland)	Heinonen, Timo	1.98 m (6 ft 6 in)		44 – 26 November 1981
SG	10	(Finland)	Kantonen, Henri	1.98 m (6 ft 6 in)		28 – 20 August 1997
F	11	(Finland)	Härsilä, Tuukka	1.92 m (6 ft 4 in)		21 – 21 February 2004
PG	13	(Finland)	Nikkarinen, Lassi	1.87 m (6 ft 2 in)		28 – 11 March 1997
F	22	(United States)	Boone, Kalib	2.05 m (6 ft 9 in)		25 – 30 November 2000
G	25	(Finland)	Hervola, Lenni	1.79 m (5 ft 10 in)		22 – 1 February 2003
F	47	(Finland)	Waxlax, Ricky	1.94 m (6 ft 4 in)		26 – 12 February 1999
SG		(United States)	Keeling, Christian	1.91 m (6 ft 3 in)		27 – 1 June 1998
SG		(Finland)	Heinonen, Osku	1.94 m (6 ft 4 in)		33 – 4 September 1992

Head coach

- (Finland) Vesa Vertio

Assistant coach(es)

- (Finland) Kimmo Kujansivu
- (Finland) Timo Saukkola

Legend

- (C) Team captain
- Injured

- Roster
Updated: October 10, 2024

=== Depth chart ===
Pos.	Starting 5	Bench 1	Bench 2
C	Kalib Boone	Timo Heinonen
PF	Rene Rougeau	Henri Mennander	Elias Leskinen
SF	Shawn Hopkins	Ricky Waxlax	Henri Kantonen
SG		Erik Sajantila	Tuukka Härsilä
PG	Lassi Nikkarinen	Curtis Hollis	Lenni Hervola

colours: Finnish players; foreign players

== Notable players ==
Note: Flags indicate national team eligibility at FIBA-sanctioned events. Players may hold other non-FIBA nationalities not displayed.

Criteria

To appear in this section a player must have either:

- Set a club record or won an individual award while at the club
- Played at least one official international match for their national team at any time
- Played at least one official NBA match at any time.

- (Finland) Shawn Huff
- (Finland) Henri Kantonen
- (Finland) Petteri Koponen
- (Finland) Tuukka Kotti
- (Finland) Carl Lindbom
- (Finland) Antti Kanervo
- (Finland) Gerald Lee Jr.
- (Finland) Lassi Nikkarinen
- (United States) Jason Conley
- (United States) Raymond Cowels III
- (Finland) Shawn Hopkins
