= 2021–22 Korisliiga season =

Korisliiga
- Season: 2021–22
- Duration: 2 October 2021 – 11 May 2022
- Games played: 223
- Teams: 12

Regular season
- Season MVP: (Finland) Remu Raitanen
- Relegated: Bisons Loimaa

Finals
- Champions: Karhu Basket
- Runners-up: Salon Vilpas
- Third place: Helsinki Seagulls
- Fourth place: Joensuun Kataja
- Finals MVP: (United States) Cameron Jones

Statistical leaders
Points	(United States) Christian Lutete IV	22.7
Rebounds	(Puerto Rico) Arnaldo Toro	17.03
Assists	(United States) Kahron Ross	6.48
Index Rating	(Puerto Rico) Arnaldo Toro	25.72

Records
- Biggest home win: Karhu Basket 89–37 UU-Korihait (20 November 2021)
- Biggest away win: Helsinki Seagulls 72–115 Pyrintö (19 October 2021)
- Highest scoring: KTP-Basket 104–113 Salon Vilpas (1 February 2022)
- Winning streak: 11 games Karhu Basket
- Losing streak: 9 games UU-Korihait
- Highest attendance: 2,102; Salon Vilpas 82–85 Karhu Basket (9 May 2022)
- Lowest attendance: 1 BC Nokia 101–62 Bisons Loimaa (19 January 2022)

The 2021–22 Korisliiga season was the 82nd season of the top professional basketball league in Finland.

== Format ==
The twelve teams played two times against each one of the other teams for a total of 22 games. The league splits into two groups (one with the first 6 teams and the other with the last 6 teams) and each team played two games against each one of the teams from the same group (for a total of 10 games). The six teams from the first group and the best two teams from the second group joined the playoffs. The last team would be directly relegated.

== Teams ==
Ura Basket did not apply for a serial licence for the Men's Korisliiga for season 2021-2022. Ura Basket will be the Division I B team, where the club's own breeders will be able to represent Kaarina basketball at the national level. In the 2020–2021 season, LoKoKo Bisons was able to celebrate the Men's Division A championship. The Bisons climbed back to the Premier Korisliiga to season 2021-2022.

Team	City	Arena
Helsinki Seagulls	Helsinki	Töölö Sports Hall
Joensuun Kataja	Joensuu	LähiTapiola Areena
Karhu Basket	Kauhajoki	Kauhajoen Yhteiskoulu
Kobra-Basket	Lapua	Lapuan Urheilutalo
UU-Korihait	Uusikaupunki	Pohitullin Sports Hall
Kouvot Basket	Kouvola	Jatke Areena
KTP-Basket	Kotka	Steveco-Areena
Lahti	Lahti	Energia Areena
BC Nokia	Nokia	Nokian Palloiluhalli
Pyrintö	Tampere	Pyynikin Palloiluhalli
Salon Vilpas	Salo	Salohalli
Bisons Loimaa	Loimaa	Loimaan liikuntahalli

== Regular season ==
=== League table ===
Pos	Team	Pld	W	L	PF	PA	PD	Pts	Qualification or relegation
1	Karhu Basket	22	20	2	1947	1552	+395	42	Advance to Placement round
2	Kouvot Basket	22	16	6	2099	1911	+188	38	Advance to Placement round
3	Helsinki Seagulls	22	15	7	1840	1701	+139	37	Advance to Placement round
4	KTP-Basket	22	13	9	1906	1811	+95	35	Advance to Placement round
5	Pyrintö	22	12	10	1976	1953	+23	34	Advance to Placement round
6	Salon Vilpas	22	12	10	1995	1865	+130	34	Advance to Placement round
7	BC Nokia	22	11	11	1773	1807	−34	33	Advance to Qualifying round
8	Joensuun Kataja	22	10	12	1771	1811	−40	32	Advance to Qualifying round
9	Lahti	22	8	14	1832	2003	−171	30	Advance to Qualifying round
10	Kobra-Basket	22	7	15	1789	1871	−82	29	Advance to Qualifying round
11	Bisons Loimaa	22	5	17	1587	1828	−241	27	Advance to Qualifying round
12	UU-Korihait	22	3	19	1589	1991	−402	25	Advance to Qualifying round

Source: Korisliiga

=== Results ===
Home \ Away	BIS	HEL	KAT	KAU	KOB	KOR	KOU	KTP	LAH	NOK	PYR	VIL
Bisons Loimaa	—	76–82	53–77	71–79	64–72	79–90	68–102	60–77	88–75	71–64	80–65	70–80
Helsinki Seagulls	83–71	—	85–71	84–75	67–79	88–71	97–90	97–89	87–81	54–59	76–79	85–79
Joensuun Kataja	82–74	78–64	—	78–106	70–64	103–76	85–89	72–82	84–74	83–74	101–106	74–95
Karhu Basket	83–62	96–76	92–67	—	91–73	89–37	101–82	92–73	111–64	91–62	105–84	99–85
Kobra-Basket	71–78	80–84	91–84	55–72	—	96–67	107–82	79–80	84–91	62–85	93–91	88–104
UU-Korihait	53–73	70–96	79–87	54–79	83–95	—	76–78	77–99	86–62	72–77	88–81	68–101
Kouvot Basket	99–72	83–78	105–94	75–79	99–62	103–80	—	89–80	114–88	110–79	95–103	99–87
KTP-Basket	96–88	96–80	57–86	64–83	92–86	103–63	93–117	—	103–77	87–59	87–77	104–113
Lahti	89–86	60–85	84–80	70–83	96–84	114–67	103–106	69–97	—	99–103	85–94	97–95
BC Nokia	101–62	65–92	73–75	75–82	95–91	94–72	77–83	88–86	75–76	—	92–80	100–97
Pyrintö	104–69	72–115	104–72	85–94	100–90	96–90	98–104	78–75	90–100	101–89	—	107–79
Salon Vilpas	104–72	81–85	84–68	76–65	96–87	98–70	104–95	81–86	101–78	81–87	74–81	—

Source: Korisliiga
Legend: Blue = home team win; Red = away team win.
Matches with lighter background shading were decided after overtime.

== Placement round ==
=== League table ===
Pos	Team	Pld	W	L	PF	PA	PD	Pts	Qualification or relegation
1	Karhu Basket	32	25	7	2666	2294	+372	57	Advance to Playoffs
2	Kouvot Basket	32	21	11	3020	2833	+187	53	Advance to Playoffs
3	Salon Vilpas	32	20	12	2882	2680	+202	52	Advance to Playoffs
4	Helsinki Seagulls	32	19	13	2720	2568	+152	51	Advance to Playoffs
5	KTP-Basket	32	18	14	2696	2627	+69	50	Advance to Playoffs
6	Pyrintö	32	15	17	2779	2791	−12	47	Advance to Playoffs

Source: Korisliiga

=== Results ===
Home \ Away	HEL	KAU	KOU	KTP	PYR	VIL
Helsinki Seagulls	—	72–82	85–90	95–71	97–80	84–85
Karhu Basket	101–98	—	113–92	107–69	0–40	76–88
Kouvot Basket	89–94	80–77	—	106–74	120–83	84–95
KTP-Basket	85–78	40–0	103–85	—	90–75	88–101
Pyrintö	104–90	77–82	110–86	84–94	—	60–80
Salon Vilpas	80–87	86–81	88–89	85–76	99–90	—

Source: Korisliiga
Legend: Blue = home team win; Red = away team win.
Matches with lighter background shading were decided after overtime.

== Qualifying round ==
=== League table ===
Pos	Team	Pld	W	L	PF	PA	PD	Pts	Qualification or relegation
1	Joensuun Kataja	32	15	17	2496	2536	−40	47	Advance to Playoffs
2	Lahti	32	14	18	2690	2826	−136	46	Advance to Playoffs
3	BC Nokia	32	14	18	2591	2676	−85	46	
4	Kobra-Basket	32	11	21	2619	2711	−92	43	
5	UU-Korihait	32	10	22	2413	2785	−372	42	
6	Bisons Loimaa	32	10	22	2407	2652	−245	42	Relegation to Koripallon I-divisioona

Source: Korisliiga

=== Results ===
Home \ Away	BIS	KAT	KOB	KOR	LAH	NOK
Bisons Loimaa	—	83–75	97–85	76–82	104–102	90–71
Joensuun Kataja	73–63	—	85–71	60–76	73–75	81–92
Kobra-Basket	82–70	85–58	—	84–90	99–97	78–82
UU-Korihait	82–73	63–79	93–98	—	70–63	86–80
Lahti	86–70	60–76	80–66	94–90	—	106–97
BC Nokia	86–94	57–65	88–82	87–92	78–95	—

Source: Korisliiga
Legend: Blue = home team win; Red = away team win.
Matches with lighter background shading were decided after overtime.

== Playoffs ==
The quarter-finals and semi-finals were played in a best-of-three 1–1–1–1–1 format. The finals were played in a best-of-seven playoff format.

=== Bracket ===
Quarterfinals
1	Karhu Basket	3
8	Lahti	0
4	Helsinki Seagulls	3
5	KTP-Basket	0
2	Kouvot Basket	2
7	Joensuun Kataja	3
3	Salon Vilpas	3
6	Pyrintö	1

Semifinals
1	Karhu Basket	4
4	Helsinki Seagulls	1
7	Joensuun Kataja	1
3	Salon Vilpas	4

Finals
1	Karhu Basket	4
3	Salon Vilpas	1
Third place
4	Helsinki Seagulls	84
7	Joensuun Kataja	54

== Finnish clubs in European competitions ==
Team	Competition	Progress
Salon Vilpas	Champions League	Qualifying round
