= 2018–19 Korisliiga season =

Korisliiga
- Season: 2018–19
- Duration: 7 October 2018 – May 2019
- Teams: 11

Finals
- Champions: Karhu (2nd title)
- Runners-up: Kouvot
- Third place: KTP
- Fourth place: Vilpas

The 2018–19 Korisliiga season was the 79th season of the top professional basketball league in Finland. Karhu successfully defended their title to repeat as Finnish national champions.

== Format ==
The eleven teams played four times against each one of the other teams for a total of 40 games. The eight best qualified teams joined the playoffs and the last one played a best-of-three relegation playoff against the First Division runners-up.

== Teams ==
Location of teams in the 2018–19 Korisliiga

Ura promoted from First Division and Kobrat remained in the league as Espoo United was expelled due to financial irregularities.

Team	City	Arena
Helsinki Seagulls	Helsinki	Töölö Sports Hall
Kataja	Joensuu	Joensuu Areena
Karhu	Kauhajoki	Kauhajoen Yhteiskoulu
Kobrat	Lapua	Lapuan Urheilutalo
Korihait	Uusikaupunki	Pohitullin Sports Hall
Kouvot	Kouvola	Mansikka-Ahon Urheiluhalli
KTP	Kotka	Steveco-Areena
Nokia	Nokia	Nokian Palloiluhalli
Pyrintö	Tampere	Pyynikin Palloiluhalli
Salon Vilpas	Vilpas	Salohalli
Ura	Kaarina	Kupittaan palloiluhalli

== Regular season ==
=== League table ===
Pos	Team	Pld	W	L	PF	PA	PD	Pts	Qualification
1	Salon Vilpas	40	33	7	3795	3442	+353	66	Qualification for the playoffs
2	Karhu	40	28	12	3513	3215	+298	56	Qualification for the playoffs
3	Pyrintö	40	24	16	3574	3331	+243	48	Qualification for the playoffs
4	Kataja	40	24	16	3532	3371	+161	48	Qualification for the playoffs
5	KTP	40	23	17	3495	3410	+85	46	Qualification for the playoffs
6	Kouvot	40	19	21	3462	3391	+71	38	Qualification for the playoffs
7	Helsinki Seagulls	40	18	22	3387	3393	−6	36	Qualification for the playoffs
8	Nokia	40	17	23	3400	3539	−139	34	Qualification for the playoffs
9	Korihait	40	16	24	3434	3602	−168	32	
10	Kobrat	40	9	31	3309	3707	−398	18	
11	Ura	40	9	31	3180	3680	−500	18	Qualification to relegation playoffs

Source: Korisliiga

=== Results ===
Home \ Away	HEL	KAU	KAT	KOB	KOR	KOU	KTP	NOK	PYR	VIL	URA	HEL	KAU	KAT	KOB	KOR	KOU	KTP	NOK	PYR	VIL	URA
Helsinki Seagulls	—	82–81	63–85	73–96	87–72	74–88	93–92	88–73	87–82	91–94	93–70	—	72–74	64–100	79–80	115–79	90–84	73–88	63–87	82–77	83–89	101–78
Karhu	85–75	—	89–90	83–74	100–85	84–72	84–87	86–94	84–76	115–112	92–80	83–65	—	93–92	94–77	94–75	82–79	98–87	98–75	86–79	96–81	93–70
Kataja	83–81	65–69	—	91–72	88–77	91–80	87–84	91–82	82–84	87–94	80–88	102–80	85–65	—	87–84	102–85	79–78	88–69	93–100	76–74	121–128	96–75
Kobrat	81–104	101–85	94–103	—	90–99	76–93	102–86	84–81	90–108	85–92	104–94	81–82	71–81	71–104	—	89–80	78–76	77–100	95–73	75–69	114–107	102–88
Korihait	66–80	86–93	88–80	79–78	—	95–88	89–99	77–85	96–102	103–104	90–108	75–96	55–97	90–98	80–93	—	84–87	84–78	80–84	71–83	81–93	93–75
Kouvot	89–86	94–79	75–61	109–90	102–73	—	82–96	85–90	94–75	81–90	97–74	94–102	80–94	97–78	109–90	77–87	—	95–93	79–96	79–60	99–103	102–98
KTP	98–89	77–86	79–77	100–92	98–81	82–78	—	88–68	74–98	76–72	65–91	86–84	98–79	100–79	94–69	105–94	95–87	—	94–89	92–95	93–100	88–68
Nokia	75–118	69–94	86–88	93–81	91–80	79–69	89–78	—	86–81	86–89	100–86	93–102	66–88	97–95	78–81	89–95	86–91	101–89	—	69–87	80–99	104–78
Pyrintö	112–90	83–80	109–93	95–87	92–81	87–85	83–91	111–83	—	91–100	110–73	86–85	87–86	95–67	106–89	107–72	80–83	78–80	104–93	—	89–90	95–60
Salon Vilpas	80–79	83–77	87–97	94–86	110–71	106–72	79–71	75–69	94–93	—	94–78	84–87	90–86	96–78	103–76	110–71	109–86	101–84	108–89	89–85	—	92–67
Ura	82–75	75–99	72–81	89–97	83–100	55–93	69–90	74–85	83–75	81–88	—	89–74	71–101	87–112	79–94	85–80	66–92	82–71	97–87	84–91	78–104	—

Source: Korisliiga
Legend: Blue = home team win; Red = away team win.

== Playoffs ==
The quarter-finals and semi-finals were played in a best-of-three 1–1–1–1–1 format with re-seeding in the semifinals. The finals were played in a best-of-seven playoff format.

=== Bracket ===
Quarterfinals
1	Salon Vilpas	3
8	Nokia	0
4	Kataja	1
5	KTP	3
(Pairings are reseeded after the first round)
2	Karhu	3
7	Helsinki Seagulls	0
3	Pyrintö	0
6	Kouvot	3

Semifinals
1	Salon Vilpas	3
6	Kouvot	4
2	Karhu	4
5	KTP	0

Finals
6	Kouvot	1
2	Karhu	4

=== Quarterfinals ===
Team 1	Series	Team 2	Game 1	Game 2	Game 3	Game 4	Game 5
Salon Vilpas	3–0	Nokia	106–70	88–70	114–87		
Karhu	3–0	Helsinki Seagulls	87–61	98–89	108–68		
Pyrintö	0–3	Kouvot	85–93	83–91	78–83		
Kataja	1–3	KTP	109–72	95–98	92–100	80–96	

=== Semifinals ===
Team 1	Series	Team 2	Game 1	Game 2	Game 3	Game 4	Game 5	Game 6	Game 7
Salon Vilpas	3–4	Kouvot	87–86	77–85	92–91	71–88	89–73	86–95	82–91
Karhu	4–0	KTP	106–72	101–90	94–70	79–68			

=== Third place game ===
Team 1	Score	Team 2
KTP	98–97	Salon Vilpas

=== Final ===
Team 1	Series	Team 2	Game 1	Game 2	Game 3	Game 4	Game 5	Game 6	Game 7
Karhu	2–1	Kouvot	96–86	74–88	85–78				

== Relegation playoffs ==
Team 1	Series	Team 2	Game 1	Game 2	Game 3
Ura Basket	2–0	LoKoKo Bisons	126–79	90–80	

== Finnish clubs in European competitions ==
Team	Competition	Progress
Karhu	Champions League	Third qualifying round
Kataja	FIBA Europe Cup	Second round
