= 2017–18 Korisliiga season =

2017–18 Korisliiga
- Season: 2017–18
- Teams: 11

Regular season
- Relegated: Kobrat

Finals
- Champions: Kauhajoki Karhu (1st title)
- Runners-up: Salon Vilpas Vikings
- Third place: Helsinki Seagulls
- Fourth place: BC Nokia

The 2017–18 Korisliiga season was the 78th season of the top professional basketball league in Finland. The season started on 28 September 2017 and ended on 18 May 2018. Kataja Basket were the defending champions, but Kauhajoki Karhu achieved their first title ever.

== Format ==
The eleven teams will play four teams against each one of the other teams for a total of 40 games. The eight best qualified teams will join the playoffs.

== Teams ==
Location of teams in the 2017–18 Korisliiga

Espoo United promoted from First Division and no team was relegated.

Team	City	Arena
Espoo United	Espoo	Espoo Metro Areena
Helsinki Seagulls	Helsinki	Töölö Sports Hall
Kataja	Joensuu	Joensuu Areena
Kauhajoki Karhu	Kauhajoki	Kauhajoen Yhteiskoulu
Kobrat	Lapua	Lapuan Urheilutalo
Korihait	Uusikaupunki	Pohitullin Sports Hall
Kouvot	Kouvola	Mansikka-Ahon Urheiluhalli
KTP	Kotka	Steveco-Areena
Nokia	Nokia	Nokian Palloiluhalli
Pyrintö	Tampere	Pyynikin Palloiluhalli
Salon Vilpas	Vilpas	Salohalli

== Regular season ==
=== Standings ===
Pos	Team	Pld	W	L	PF	PA	PD	Pts	Qualification or relegation
1	Vilpas Vikings	40	32	8	3794	3137	+657	64	Qualification for the playoffs
2	Kauhajoki Karhu	40	28	12	3561	3305	+256	56	Qualification for the playoffs
3	Nokia	40	24	16	3511	3396	+115	48	Qualification for the playoffs
4	Helsinki Seagulls	40	24	16	3489	3293	+196	48	Qualification for the playoffs
5	Kouvot	40	23	17	3444	3345	+99	46	Qualification for the playoffs
6	Kataja	40	22	18	3446	3378	+68	44	Qualification for the playoffs
7	Pyrintö	40	22	18	3503	3355	+148	44	Qualification for the playoffs
8	KTP	40	16	24	3347	3459	−112	32	Qualification for the playoffs
9	Espoo United	40	15	25	3480	3635	−155	30	
10	Korihait	40	7	33	3292	4025	−733	14	
11	Kobrat	40	7	33	3266	3805	−539	14	Relegation to First Division A

Source: Korisliiga

== Playoffs ==
The quarter-finals and semi-finals were played in a best-of-three 1–1–1–1–1 format. The finals were played in a best-of-seven playoff format.

=== Bracket ===
Quarterfinals
1	Salon Vilpas	3
8	KTP	1
4	Helsinki Seagulls	3
5	Kouvot	1
(Pairings are reseeded after the first round)
2	Kauhajoki Karhu	3
7	Pyrintö	0
3	Nokia	3
6	Kataja	0

Semifinals
1	Salon Vilpas	4
4	Helsinki Seagulls	0
2	Kauhajoki Karhu	4
3	Nokia	1

Finals
1	Salon Vilpas	2
2	Kauhajoki Karhu	4

=== Quarterfinals ===
Team 1	Series	Team 2	Game 1	Game 2	Game 3	Game 4	Game 5
Salon Vilpas	3–1	KTP	83–87	95–64	77–69	88–55	
Kauhajoki Karhu	3–0	Pyrintö	84–74	100–88	108–75		
Nokia	3–0	Kataja	95–78	103–82	92–80		
Helsinki Seagulls	3–1	Kouvot	88–90	76–72	82–73	83–74	

=== Semifinals ===
Team 1	Series	Team 2	Game 1	Game 2	Game 3	Game 4	Game 5	Game 6	Game 7
Salon Vilpas	4–0	Helsinki Seagulls	78–71	86–77	79–71	86–69			
Kauhajoki Karhu	4–1	Nokia	92–78	84–89	78–72	105–102	84–82		

=== Third place game ===
Team 1	Score	Team 2
Nokia	97–104	Helsinki Seagulls

=== Final ===
Team 1	Series	Team 2	Game 1	Game 2	Game 3	Game 4	Game 5	Game 6	Game 7
Salon Vilpas	2–4	Kauhajoki Karhu	86–75	79–85	79–83	75–93	86–79	96–99	

== Clubs in European competitions ==
Team	Competition	Progress	Ref
Kataja	Champions League	Third qualifying round	
Kataja	FIBA Europe Cup	Second round	
