= BC Nokia =

- Leagues: Korisliiga
- Founded: 1997; 29 years ago
- History: BC Nokia (1997–present)
- Arena: AGCO Power Arena
- Location: Nokia, Finland
- Team colors: Yellow, Black, White
- Head coach: Greg Gibson
- Team captain: Niko Mattila
- Championships: 1 (2024)
- Website: www.bcnokia.fi
Home	Away

BC Nokia is a professional basketball club based in Nokia, Finland. The team currently plays in the top level Korisliiga.

== History ==
In the 2014–15 season, Nokia won the Finnish First Division and was promoted to the Korisliiga. The team finished in the 8th place in its first Korisliiga season, but defeated 1st seed Kataja BC in the first round. The team was defeated in the semi-finals, but did manage to claim the bronze medal for the 2015–16 season.

== Honours ==
- Finnish First Division

Champions (1): 2014–15

- Korisliiga

Champions (1): 2023-24
Third place (1): 2015–16

- Finnish Basketball Cup

Runner up (1) 2024

== Season by season ==
Season	Tier	League	Pos.	Finnish Cup
2014–15	2	First Division A	1st	—
2015–16	1	Korisliiga	3rd	—
2016–17	1	Korisliiga	7th	—
2017–18	1	Korisliiga	4th	—
2018–19	1	Korisliiga	8th	—
2019–20	1	Korisliiga	(6th)	—
2020–21	1	Korisliiga	6th	Semifinals
2021–22	1	Korisliiga	9th	—
2022–23	1	Korisliiga	8th	—
2023–24	1	Korisliiga	1st	Runner-up
2024–25	1	Korisliiga	9th	—

=== Current roster ===
BC Nokia roster
Players
Coaches

Pos.	No.	Nat.	Name	Ht.	Age
G	3	(United States)	Ross, Kahron	1.80 m (5 ft 11 in)	31 – 6 October 1995
F	5	(Finland)	Boman, Hugo	1.95 m (6 ft 5 in)	24 – 26 March 2002
F	8	(Finland)	Ahonen, Antti	1.98 m (6 ft 6 in)	25 – 7 January 2001
F	9	(United States)	Johnson, Kyle	1.89 m (6 ft 2 in)	26 – 9 April 2000
F	10	(United States)	Green, Xavier	1.98 m (6 ft 6 in)	30 – 9 September 1996
F	13	(Finland)	Besselink, Max	2.02 m (6 ft 8 in)	24 – 4 April 2002
G	15	(Finland)	Nikula, Aamos	1.78 m (5 ft 10 in)	23 – 7 January 2003
G	17	(Finland)	Mattila, Niko	1.92 m (6 ft 4 in)	32 – 16 February 1994
F	18	(Finland)	Kanervo, Antti	1.93 m (6 ft 4 in)	37 – 12 April 1989
C	21	(United States)	Brown, Clevon	2.03 m (6 ft 8 in)	28 – 18 July 1998
F	33	(Finland)	Murphy, Tomas	2.03 m (6 ft 8 in)	28 – 1 July 1998
C	35	(United States)	Lyons, Tyrone	2.00 m (6 ft 7 in)	26 – 22 September 2000
F	41	(Finland)	Sauramo, Elias	1.98 m (6 ft 6 in)	22 – 16 September 2004
F	44	(Finland)	Roiko, Santeri	1.95 m (6 ft 5 in)	23 – 22 May 2003
G	55	(Finland)	Aidoo, Fiifi	1.90 m (6 ft 3 in)	30 – 5 April 1996

Head coach

- (Finland) Greg Gibson

Assistant coach(es)

- (Finland) Aleksi Koskinen

Legend

- (C) Team captain
- Injured

- Roster
Updated: September 19, 2024

== Notable players ==
- (Finland) Antti Kanervo
- (Finland) Fiifi Aidoo
- (Finland) Max Besselink
- (United States) Clevon Brown
- (United States) Daeshon Francis
