= Vilpas Vikings =

Vilpas
- Leagues: Korisliiga; Champions League
- Founded: 1908; 118 years ago
- History: Salon Vilpas (1908–present)
- Arena: Salohalli
- Capacity: 2,500
- Location: Salo, Finland
- Team colors: Red, Black, White
- President: Keijo Poutiainen
- Team manager: Antero Jokinen
- Head coach: Jussi Savolainen
- Championships: 1 Finnish League; 1 Finnish Cup
- Website: www.vilpasvikings.fi
Home	Away

Salon Vilpas is a professional basketball club based in Salo, Finland. The team currently plays in the top level Korisliiga. The Vikings are a part of the Salon Vilpas multi-sport club.

In 2021, Vilpas won its first Korisliiga championship.

== Current roster ==
Note: Flags indicate national team eligibility at FIBA-sanctioned events. Players may hold other non-FIBA nationalities not displayed.

Vilpas Vikings roster
Players
Coaches

Pos.	No.	Nat.	Name	Ht.
F	0	(United States)	Chavis, Karl	1.98 m (6 ft 6 in)	25 – 5 September 2001
G	1	(United States)	Walker, Leland	1.85 m (6 ft 1 in)	23 – 12 April 2003
G	2	(Finland)	Stefanovic, Simeon	1.88 m (6 ft 2 in)	20 – 15 September 2006
SF	3	(United States)	Jeffries, D.J.	2.01 m (6 ft 7 in)	26 – 28 December 1999
G	4	(Finland)	Koivisto, Mikko (C)	1.94 m (6 ft 4 in)	39 – 18 April 1987
G	10	(United States)	Godfrey, Jarred	1.96 m (6 ft 5 in)	26 – 13 September 2000
C	12	(Finland)	Aalto, Mikael	2.08 m (6 ft 10 in)	32 – 12 September 1994
G	14	(Finland)	Lindberg, Sebastian	1.93 m (6 ft 4 in)	24 – 11 August 2002
SF	21	(Finland)	Laine, Riku	1.97 m (6 ft 6 in)	29 – 14 May 1997
SG	22	(Finland)	Innamaa, Eero	1.87 m (6 ft 2 in)	28 – 14 September 1998
C	35	(Finland)	Laavainen, Aamos	2.04 m (6 ft 8 in)	23 – 6 June 2003

Head coach

- (Finland) Jussi Savolainen

Assistant coach(es)

- (Finland) Teemu Rannikko

Legend

- (C) Team captain
- Injured

- Roster
Updated: October 17, 2026

== Season by season ==
Season	Tier	League	Pos.
2009–10	1	Korisliiga	11th
2010–11	1	Korisliiga	10th
2011–12	1	Korisliiga	8th
2012–13	1	Korisliiga	8th
2013–14	1	Korisliiga	9th
2014–15	1	Korisliiga	10th
2015–16	1	Korisliiga	6th
2016–17	1	Korisliiga	2nd
2017–18	1	Korisliiga	2nd

== Trophies ==
- Korisliiga: (2):
  - 2020–21, 2025–26
- Finnish Basketball Cup: (1)
  - 2018–19

== Individual awards ==
Korisliiga MVP

- (United States) Tim Kisner (2005)
- (United States) Juwan Staten (2017)

Korisliiga MIP

- (Finland) Teemu Suokas (2024)

== Notable players ==
Note: Flags indicate national team eligibility at FIBA-sanctioned events. Players may hold other non-FIBA nationalities not displayed.

Criteria

To appear in this section a player must have either:

- Set a club record or won an individual award while at the club
- Played at least one official international match for their national team at any time
- Played at least one official NBA match at any time.

- (Finland) Teemu Rannikko
- (Finland) Roope Ahonen
- (Finland) Perttu Blomgren
- (Finland) Jacob Grandison
- (Finland) Henri Kantonen
- (Finland) Aatu Kivimäki
- (United Kingdom) Amin Adamu
- (United States) Austin Dufault
- (United States) Javontae Hawkins
