= Kobrat =

- Leagues: Korisliiga
- Founded: 1989; 37 years ago
- History: Lapuan Koripojat (1989–2000); Korikobrat (2000–2015); Kobrat (2015–present)
- Arena: Lapuan Urheilutalo
- Location: Lapua, Finland
- Head coach: Ville Turja
- Website: korikobrat.com
Home	Away

Kobrat (English: Cobras) is a Finnish professional basketball team from Lapua. The team plays in Korisliiga, the highest tier of Finnish basketball.

== History ==
The club was founded in 1989 as 'Lapuan Koripojat', shortly 'LaKoPo', but was renamed 'Korikobrat' in 2000. The team is playing in the Korisliiga league since the 2012–13 season.

In 2016 and 2018, Kobrat finished last and was relegated to the First Division, but recovered their place due to irregularities of other teams.

== Notable players ==
- Set a club record or won an individual award as a professional player.
- Played at least one official international match for his senior national team at any time.

- (Finland) Fiifi Aidoo
- (Finland) Samuel Haanpää
- (Serbia) Ognjen Kuzmić
- (United States) Kyle Fogg
- (United States) D. J. Richardson
- (Democratic Republic of the Congo) Christian Lutete
- (Finland) Antto Nikkarinen
- (Finland) Perttu Blomgren
- (Finland) Remu Raitanen
