= Korisliiga Finals MVP =

Finnish basketball award

The Korisliiga Finals Most Valuable Player (MVP) is an annual award that is handed out to the best player in the Finals of a given Finnish Korisliiga season. The award usually goes to a player that is on the championship team.

== Winners ==
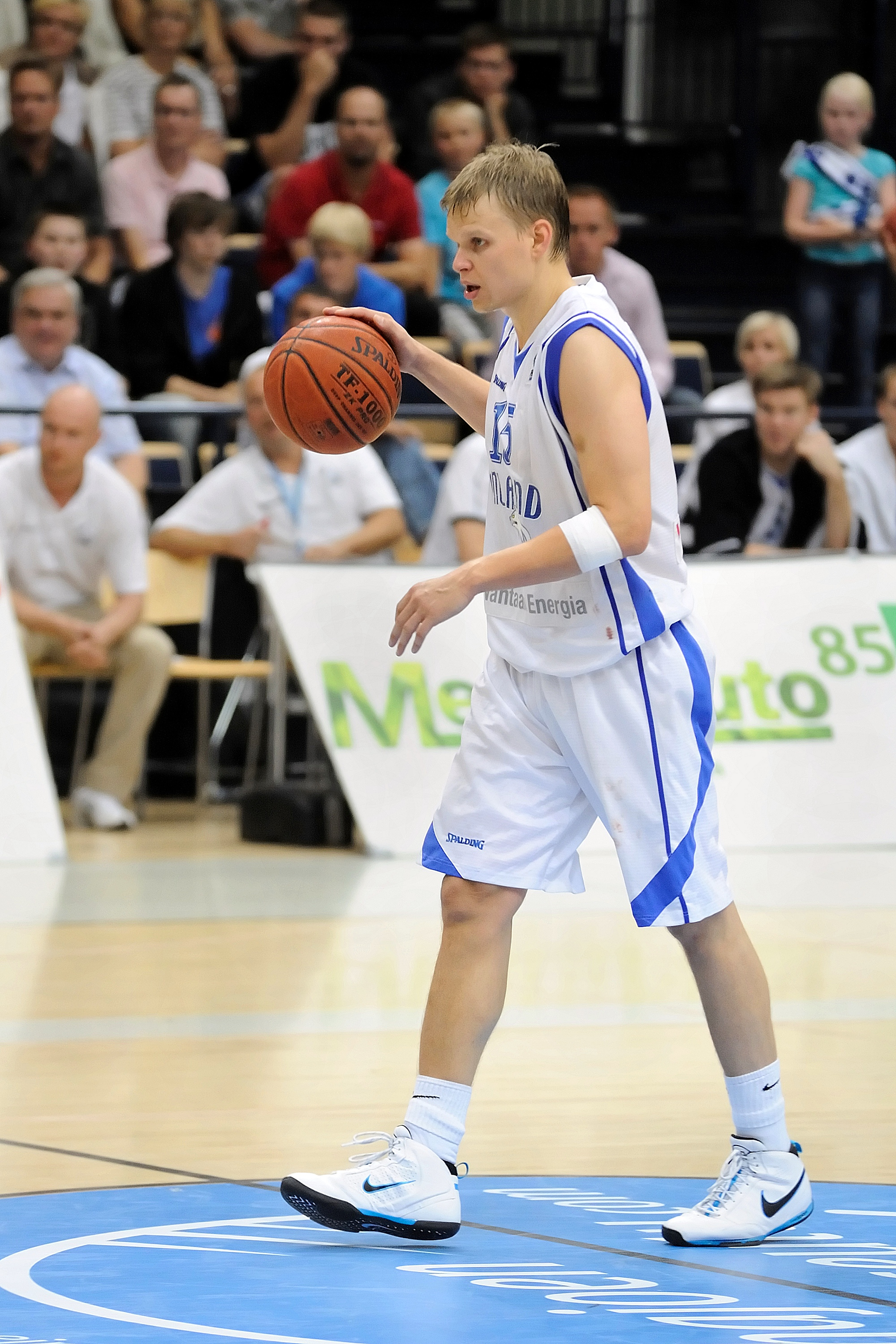
Teemu Rannikko, winner in the 2014–15 season

Season	Nat	Player	Pos	Team	Ref
1999–00	(Finland)	Juha Luhtanen	G	Namika Lahti	
2000–01	(United States)	Lonnie Cooper	G	Espoon Honka	
2001–02	(Finland)	Markus Hemdahl	PF	Espoon Honka	
2002–03	(Finland)	Heikki Zitting	SF	Espoon Honka	
2003–04	(Finland)	Anssi Kinnaslampi	G	Kouvot	
2004–05	(United States)	Matthew Williams	PF	Lappeenrannan NMKY	
2005–06	(Denmark)	Chanan Colman	SG	Lappeenrannan NMKY	
2006–07	(Finland)	Jukka Matinen	PF	Espoon Honka	
2007–08	(Jamaica)	Akeem Scott	PG	Espoon Honka	
2008–09	(Finland)	Vesa Mäkäläinen	SF	Namika Lahti	
2009–10	(United States)	Damon Williams	PF	Tampereen Pyrintö	
2010–11	(United States)	Damon Williams (2×)	PF	Tampereen Pyrintö	
2011–12	(United States)	Jeb Ivey	SG	Nilan Bisons Loimaa	
2012–13	(United States)	Jeb Ivey (2×)	SG	Nilan Bisons Loimaa	
2013–14	(United States)	Damon Williams (3×)	PF	Tampereen Pyrintö	
2014–15	(Finland)	Teemu Rannikko	PG	Kataja	
2015–16	(United States)	D.J. Richardson	SG	Kouvot	
2016–17	(Finland)	Teemu Rannikko (2)	PG	Kataja	
2017–18	(Bosnia and Herzegovina)	Bojan Šarčević	PG	Karhu	
2018–19	(United States)	Cameron Jones	SG	Karhu	
2020–21	(United States)	Jeremiah Wood	F	Salon Vilpas	
2021–22	(United States)	Cameron Jones (2)	SG	Karhu	
2022–23	(United States)	Rene Rougeau	F	Helsinki Seagulls	
2023–24	(United States)	Both Gach	F	BC Nokia	
2024–25	(United States)	Rene Rougeau (2)	F	Helsinki Seagulls	
2025–26	(Finland)	Samu Adler	G	Vilpas Vikings	

Note: Flags indicate national team eligibility at FIBA-sanctioned events. Players may hold other non-FIBA nationalities not displayed.
