= 2006–07 Korisliiga season =

Finnish basketball season

Korisliiga
- Season: 2006–07
- Duration: September 30, 2006-April 24, 2007
- Games played: 44
- Teams: 12

Regular season
- Top seed: Joensuun Kataja
- Season MVP: (Finland) Sami Lehtoranta (Domestic) (United States) Jerald Fields (Foreign)
- Relegated: UU-Korihait (11); Pussihukat (12)

Finals
- Champions: Espoon Honka (6th title)
- Runners-up: Namika Lahti
- Third place: Joensuun Kataja
- Fourth place: KTP-Basket
- Finals MVP: (Finland) Jukka Matinen

Statistical leaders
Points	(United States) Chris Davis	23.0
Rebounds	(United States) Marcus Jackson	12.3
Assists	(United States) James Wright	4.9

Records
- Average attendance: 918

The Korisliiga is the premier basketball league in Finland. The 2006-07 season was the 67th Finnish club basketball season. It began on September 30, 2006 and ended on April 24, 2007. Espoon Honka won the Final series by 3-0 against Namika Lahti and obtained their sixth national championship. Sami Lehtoranta won the MVP Award and Jukka Matinen won the Finals MVP Award.

== Regular season ==
	Team	G	W	L	PF/G	PA/G	PTS
1	Joensuun Kataja	44	34	10	89.5	79.5	68
2	Espoon Honka	44	30	14	88.6	82.1	60
3	KTP-Basket	44	27	17	88.7	85.0	54
4	Torpan Pojat	44	27	17	84.3	81.0	54
5	Namika Lahti	44	24	20	82.8	81.9	48
6	Lappeenrannan NMKY	44	21	23	82.5	80.7	42
7	Porvoon Tarmo	44	21	23	84.8	85.6	42
8	Team Componenta	44	18	26	83.0	84.5	36
9	Kouvot	44	18	26	78.5	82.0	36
10	Tampereen Pyrintö	44	16	28	87.8	94.4	32
11	UU-Korihait	44	16	28	82.0	86.3	32
12	Pussihukat	44	12	32	75.3	85.1	24

== Individual leaders ==
Statistics are for the regular season.

=== Scoring ===
Rank	Name	Team	PPG
1.	(United States) Chris Davis	Team Componenta	23.0
2.	(United States) Ed Nelson	UU-Korihait	22.3
3.	(United States) Eric Washington	Tampereen Pyrintö	21.2
4.	(United States) James Wright	Tampereen Pyrintö	20.3
5.	(United States) Dennis Harrison	Tampereen Pyrintö	19.4

=== Assists ===
Rank	Name	Team	APG
1.	(United States) James Wright	Tampereen Pyrintö	4.9
2.	(United States) Jermaine Spivey	KTP-Basket	4.2
3.	(Finland) Petteri Koponen	Espoon Honka	4.1
4.	(Finland) Petri Virtanen	Joensuun Kataja	3.7
5.	(United States) Ben Perkins	UU-Korihait	3.1

=== Rebounds ===
Rank	Name	Team	RPG
1.	(United States) Marcus Jackson	Team Componenta	12.3
2.	(United States) Ed Nelson	UU-Korihait	11.6
3.	(United States) Luke Lloyd	Joensuun Kataja	10.5
4.	(United States) Ryan McDade	Porvoon Tarmo	10.3
5.	(United States) Sidney Holmes	Namika Lahti	10.1

== Playoffs ==
Quarterfinals
3	KTP-Basket	3
6	Lappeenrannan NMKY	0
2	Espoon Honka	3
7	Porvoon Tarmo	0
4	Torpan Pojat	1
5	Namika Lahti	3
1	Joensuun Kataja	3
8	Team Componenta	0

Semifinals
Espoon Honka	3
KTP-Basket	2
Joensuun Kataja	2
Namika Lahti	3

Finals
Espoon Honka	3
Namika Lahti	0
Third place
Joensuun Kataja	168
KTP-Basket	154
