= 2008–09 Korisliiga season =

Korisliiga
- Season: 2008–09
- Duration: October 3, 2008-May 16, 2009
- Games played: 44
- Teams: 12

Regular season
- Top seed: Joensuun Kataja
- Season MVP: (Finland) Antti Nikkilä (Domestic) (United States) Ray Nixon (Foreign)
- Relegated: Porvoon Tarmo

Finals
- Champions: Namika Lahti (2nd title)
- Runners-up: Joensuun Kataja
- Third place: Tampereen Pyrintö
- Fourth place: Espoon Honka
- Finals MVP: (Finland) Vesa Mäkäläinen

Statistical leaders
Points	(United States) Jeremiah Wood	20.1
Rebounds	(United States) DeWayne Richardson	12.7
Assists	(United States) Frank Richards	4.1

Records
- Average attendance: 911 ▲

The Korisliiga is the premier basketball league in Finland. The 2008-09 season was the 69th Finnish club basketball season. It began on October 3, 2008, and ended on May 16, 2009. Namika Lahti won the Final series by 3–0 against Joensuun Kataja. Antti Nikkilä won the MVP Award and Vesa Mäkäläinen won the Finals MVP Award.

== Regular season ==
#	Team	G	W	L	PF/G	PA/G	PTS
1	Joensuun Kataja	44	32	12	92.3	82.6	64
2	Kouvot	44	29	15	80.3	73.6	58
3	Espoon Honka	44	28	16	77.3	71.3	56
4	Namika Lahti	44	27	17	81.0	77.8	54
5	UU-Korihait	44	27	17	79.3	75.9	54
6	KTP-Basket	44	23	21	79.1	77.9	46
7	Tampereen Pyrintö	44	22	22	83.6	82.6	44
8	Torpan Pojat	44	20	24	73.4	78.0	40
9	Lappeenrannan NMKY	44	18	26	79.6	83.5	36
10	Forssan Koripojat	44	18	26	78.4	81.2	36
11	Team Componenta	44	13	31	74.3	82.8	26
12	Porvoon Tarmo	44	7	37	72.3	83.8	14

== Individual leaders ==
Statistics are for the regular season.

=== Scoring ===
Rank	Name	Team	PPG
1.	(United States) Jeremiah Wood	Joensuun Kataja	20.1
2.	(United States) Larry Blair	Joensuun Kataja	19.6
2.	(United States) HL Coleman	Lappeenrannan NMKY	19.4
4.	(United States) Frank Richards	Team Componenta	19.4
5.	(United States) Steve Smith	KTP-Basket	18.2

=== Assists ===
Rank	Name	Team	APG
1.	(United States) Frank Richards	Team Componenta	4.1
2.	(United States) Damon Williams	Tampereen Pyrintö/KTP-Basket	4.0
3.	(United States) Larry Blair	Joensuun Kataja	4.0
4.	(Finland) Ilkka Vuori	Namika Lahti	3.9
5.	(Denmark) (Israel) Chanan Colman	Espoon Honka/Lappeenrannan NMKY	3.5

=== Rebounds ===
Rank	Name	Team	RPG
1.	(United States) DeWayne Richardson	Porvoon Tarmo	12.7
2.	(United States) Jeremiah Wood	Joensuun Kataja	12.4
3.	(United States) Ray Cunningham	Forssan Koripojat	10.5
4.	(United States) Damon Williams	Tampereen Pyrintö/KTP-Basket	10.4
5.	(United States) Clifton Jones	Team Componenta	9.4

== Playoffs ==
Quarterfinals
1	Joensuun Kataja	3
8	Torpan Pojat	0
2	Kouvot	0
7	Tampereen Pyrintö	3
3	Espoon Honka	3
6	KTP-Basket	0
4	Namika Lahti	3
5	UU-Korihait	1

Semifinals
Joensuun Kataja	3
Tampereen Pyrintö	1
Espoon Honka	0
Namika Lahti	3

Finals
Joensuun Kataja	0
Namika Lahti	3
Third place
Espoon Honka	74
Tampereen Pyrintö	83
