= Korisliiga Defensive Player of the Year =

The Korisliiga Defensive Player of the Year is an annual award that is handed out to the best defensive player in a given Korisliiga season.

== Winners ==
Season	Nat	Player	Pos	Team	Ref
1993–94	(Finland)	Aleksi Wuorenjuuri	G	Torpan Pojat	
1994–95	(Finland)	Greg Joyner	SF	Torpan Pojat	
1995–96	(Finland)	Greg Joyner (2)	SF	Torpan Pojat	
1996–97	(Finland)	Greg Joyner (3)	SF	Torpan Pojat	
1997–98	(Finland)	Kari Hautala	G	Torpan Pojat	
1998–99	(United States Virgin Islands)	Faisal Abraham	F	Salon Vilpas	
1999–00	(Finland)	Greg Joyner (4)	SF	Torpan Pojat	
2000–01	(Finland)	Tero Minetti	PG	Pyrbasket	
2001–02	(Finland)	Anssi Kinnaslampi	G	KTP-Basket	
2002–03	(Finland)	Anssi Kinnaslampi	SF	Espoon Honka	
2003–04	(Finland)	Tom Gustafsson	C	Namika Lahti	
2004–05	(Finland)	Juha Sten	G	Aura Basket	
2005–06	(Finland)	Timo Heinonen	F	Pussihukat	
2006–07	(Finland)	Ilkka Vuori	G	Namika Lahti	
2007–08	(Finland)	Juha Sten (2)	G	Lappeenrannan NMKY	
2008–09	(Finland)	Vesa Mäkäläinen	SF	Namika Lahti	
2009–10	(Finland)	Timo Heinonen (2)	SF	Torpan Pojat	
2010–11	(Finland)	Vesa Mäkäläinen (2)	SF	Kauhajoen Karhu	
2011–12	(Finland)	Antero Lehto	PG	Tampereen Pyrintö	
2012–13	(Finland)	Henri Hirvikoski	G/F	Kauhajoen Karhu	
2013–14	(Finland)	Tuukka Kotti	PF	Nilan Bisons Loimaa	
2014–15	(Finland)	Vesa Mäkäläinen (3)	SF	Namika Lahti	
2015–16	(Finland)	Tuukka Kotti (2)	PF	Nilan Bisons Loimaa	
2016–17	(Finland)	Vesa Mäkäläinen (4)	SF	Joensuun Kataja	
2017–18	(Finland)	Tuukka Kotti (3)	PF	Helsinki Seagulls	
2018–19	(Finland)	Tuukka Kotti (4)	PF	Helsinki Seagulls	
2020–21	(Finland)	Lassi Nikkarinen	G	BC Nokia	
2021–22	(Finland)	Lassi Nikkarinen (2)	G	Helsinki Seagulls	
2022–23	(Finland)	Perttu Blomgren	G	Salon Vilpas	
2023–24	(Finland)	Thomas Tumba	F	Kataja Basket	
2024–25	(Finland)	Lassi Nikkarinen (3)	G	Helsinki Seagulls	

Note: Flags indicate national team eligibility at FIBA-sanctioned events. Players may hold other non-FIBA nationalities not displayed.
