= 2007–08 Korisliiga season =

Korisliiga
- Season: 2007–08
- Duration: October 6, 2007 - April 27, 2008
- Games played: 44
- Teams: 12

Regular season
- Top seed: Joensuun Kataja
- Season MVP: (Finland) Petteri Koponen (Domestic) (United States) Corey Smith (Foreign)
- Relegated: Kauhajoen Karhu

Finals
- Champions: Espoon Honka (7th title)
- Runners-up: Kouvot
- Third place: Lappeenrannan NMKY
- Fourth place: Torpan Pojat
- Finals MVP: (United States) Akeem Scott

Statistical leaders
Points	(United States) Damon Williams	23.1
Rebounds	(United States) Mark McCarroll	12.4
Assists	(United States) Tyson Patterson	5.2

Records
- Average attendance: 883 ▼

The Korisliiga is the premier basketball league in Finland. The 2007-08 season was the 68th Finnish club basketball season. It began on October 6, 2007 and ended on April 27, 2008. The Espoon Honka successfully defended their national championship with a 3-1 victory over the Kouvot. Petteri Koponen won the MVP Award and Akeem Scott won the Finals MVP Award.

== Regular season ==
	Team	G	W	L	PF/G	PA/G	PCT.
1	Lappeenrannan NMKY	22	17	5	93.6	77.1	.773
2	Torpan Pojat	42	32	10	87.6	81.6	.762
3	Kouvot	42	31	11	82.8	73.6	.738
4	Espoon Honka	42	27	15	86.4	81.7	.643
5	Namika Lahti	42	21	21	82.3	80.9	.500
6	UU-Korihait	42	19	23	81.2	82.0	.452
7	Porvoon Tarmo	42	18	24	82.5	87.8	.429
8	Tampereen Pyrintö	42	18	24	81.9	85.5	.429
9	KTP-Basket	42	17	25	89.5	90.0	.405
10	Joensuun Kataja	42	16	26	79.8	82.6	.381
11	Team Componenta	42	14	28	80.1	87.7	.333
12	Kauhajoen Karhu	42	12	30	80.9	89.8	.286

== Individual leaders ==
Statistics are for the regular season.

=== Scoring ===
Rank	Name	Team	PPG
1.	(United States) Damon Williams	Tampereen Pyrintö	23.1
2.	(United States) Adrian Henning	Lappeenrannan NMKY	22.3
2.	(United States) Chris Hester	Team Componenta	22.3
4.	(United States) Steve Smith	KTP-Basket	21.7
5.	(United States) Corey Smith	Kouvot	21.0

=== Assists ===
Rank	Name	Team	APG
1.	(United States) Tyson Patterson	Torpan Pojat	5.2
2.	(Finland) Petri Virtanen	Lappeenrannan NMKY	4.5
3.	(Finland) Juha Sten	Lappeenrannan NMKY	4.4
4.	(United States) Louis Hinnant	Joensuun Kataja	4.4
5.	(United States) Damon Williams	Tampereen Pyrintö	4.2

=== Rebounds ===
Rank	Name	Team	RPG
1.	(United States) Mark McCarroll	Porvoon Tarmo	12.4
2.	(United States) Nick Wallery	Team Componenta	12.0
3.	(United States) Emmanuel Dies	KTP-Basket	11.4
4.	(United States) Damon Williams	Tampereen Pyrintö	11.0
5.	(United States) Damion Dantzler	Tampereen Pyrintö	10.8

== Playoffs ==
Quarterfinals
2	Torpan Pojat	3
7	Porvoon Tarmo	2
3	Kouvot	3
6	UU-Korihait	0
1	Lappeenrannan NMKY	3
8	Tampereen Pyrintö	1
4	Espoon Honka	3
5	Namika Lahti	0

Semifinals
Torpan Pojat	0
Kouvot	3
Lappeenrannan NMKY	1
Espoon Honka	3

Finals
Kouvot	1
Espoon Honka	3
Third place
Lappeenrannan NMKY	64
Torpan Pojat	56
