= 2012–13 Korisliiga season =

Finnish basketball

Korisliiga
- Season: 2012–13
- Games played: 44 (Regular season)
- Teams: 12

Regular season
- Top seed: Tampereen Pyrintö
- Season MVP: (Finland) Samuel Haanpää (Domestic) (United States) Martin Zeno (Foreign)

Finals
- Champions: Nilan Bisons Loimaa; 2nd title
- Runners-up: KTP Kotka
- Third place: Joensuun Kataja
- Fourth place: Kauhajoen Karhu
- Finals MVP: (United States) Jeb Ivey

Awards
- Defensive Player: (Finland) Henri Hirvikoski
- Rookie of the Year: (Finland) Jussi Turja
- Coach of the Year: (Finland) Sami Toiviainen
- Sixth Man: (Finland) Petri Virtanen
- Most Improved: (Finland) Vesa Heinonen

Statistical leaders
Points	(United States) Martin Zeno	22.5
Rebounds	(United States) Antone Robinson	10.5
Assists	(United States) Damon Williams	6.7

The 2012–13 Korisliiga season was the 73rd season of the Finnish national championship named Korisliiga, the highest professional basketball league in Finland. Bisons Loimaa successfully defended its title.

== Regular season ==
Pos.	Team	GP	W	L	PF	PA	Pt	Qualified for
1.	Nilan Bisons	44	35	9	3974	3419	70	Playoffs
2.	Joensuun Kataja	44	35	9	3897	3353	70	Playoffs
3.	KTP-Basket	44	32	12	3927	3505	64	Playoffs
4.	Tampereen Pyrintö	44	31	13	3902	3419	62	Playoffs
5.	Kauhajoen Karhu	44	27	17	3757	3596	54	Playoffs
6.	Kouvot	44	22	22	3456	3622	44	Playoffs
7.	Lappeenrannan NMKY	44	17	27	3535	3782	34	Playoffs
8.	Salon Vilpas	44	14	30	3418	3534	28	Playoffs
9.	UU-Korihait	44	13	31	3420	3803	26	
10.	Korikobrat	44	13	31	3634	3882	26	
11.	Namika Lahti	44	13	31	3299	3764	26	
12.	Forssan Koripojat	44	12	32	3532	4072	24	Relegated
