= Alexander Madsen =

Finnish basketball player (born 1995)

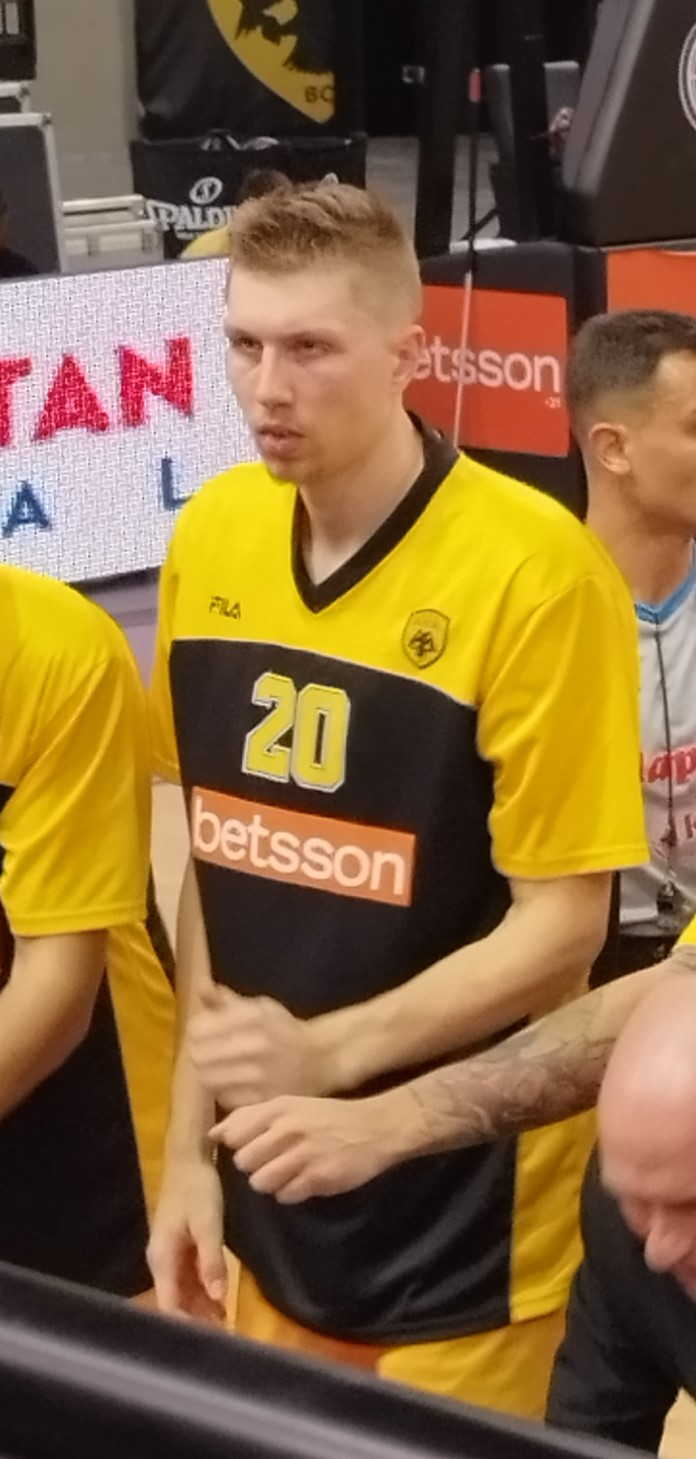
- Madsen in action with AEK Athens

Szolnoki Olajbányász
- Position: Center
- League: Hungarian Basketball League

Personal information
- Born: 26 January 1995 (age 31) Valkeala, Finland
- Listed height: 2.08 m (6 ft 10 in)
- Listed weight: 103 kg (227 lb)

Career information
- Playing career: 2011–present

Career history
- 2011–2016: Kouvot
- 2016–2018: USK Praha
- 2018–2019: CB Gran Canaria
- 2019–2022: VEF Rīga
- 2022–2023: AEK Athens
- 2023: VEF Rīga
- 2023–2024: MoraBanc Andorra
- 2024–2025: Força Lleida
- 2025–2026: Karditsa
- 2026–present: Szolnoki Olajbányász

Career highlights
- Latvian-Estonian League champion (2022); 3x Latvian League champion (2020–2022); Finnish Korisliiga champion (2016); Latvian Cup winner (2022); Korisliiga Sixth Man of the Year (2016); Latvian Cup MVP (2022)

Alexander Thor Bjerregård Madsen (born 26 January 1995) is a Finnish professional basketball player for Szolnoki Olajbányász of the Hungarian Basketball League. He also represents the Finnish national team in international competition.

== Club career ==
In Finland, Alexander Madsen played for Kouvot from 2012–2016.

He later played for USK Praha of the National Basketball League (Czech Republic) from 2016 to 2018.

After playing three seasons for VEF Rīga in Latvia, on July 25, 2022, Madsen signed a one-year contract with AEK Athens of the Greek Basket League and the FIBA Champions league. In 20 domestic league games, he averaged 6.2 points and 2.5 rebounds, playing around 14 minutes per contest.

He returned to VEF Riga for the 2023–24 season. After the team was knocked out of the FIBA Champions league, he terminated his contract with the club in the end of 2023.

On 29 December 2023, Madsen signed with BC Andorra of the Spanish Liga ACB.

In July 2024, Madsen joined newly promoted Liga ACB team Força Lleida.

In September 2025, he returned to Greece, signing with Karditsa.

== National team ==
Madsen played 64 matches combined for his country's youth national teams.

Later, he became a member of the senior Finnish national basketball team. He represented Finland in the EuroBasket 2022 and in the 2023 FIBA World Cup. Madsen also played in the 2024 FIBA Olympic qualifying tournament.

== Personal life ==
Madsen was born in Valkeala, Kouvola, Finland, to a Danish father and Finnish mother. His parents played volleyball in Finland: Niels Madsen played in the Finland Volleyball League and Vuokko Naukkarinen in the Finnish Women's Volleyball League. His older sister Michaela Madsen and younger sister Yasmine Madsen are Finnish international volleyball players, and his cousin Joel Naukkarinen is a World Champion rower. Madsen is a cook by education.

Madsen started his mandatory military service in Santahamina, Helsinki, in April 2019

== Career statistics ==
Legend
GP	Games played	GS	Games started	MPG	Minutes per game
FG%	Field goal percentage	3P%	3-point field goal percentage	FT%	Free throw percentage
RPG	Rebounds per game	APG	Assists per game	SPG	Steals per game
BPG	Blocks per game	PPG	Points per game	**Bold**	Career high

=== FIBA Champions League ===
Year	Team	GP	GS	MPG	FG%	3P%	FT%	RPG	APG	SPG	BPG	PPG
2019–20	VEF Rīga	11	11	21.9	.405	.292	.421	4.5	2.0	.9	**1.2**	6.8
2020–21	VEF Rīga	9	9	**28.3**	.500	.320	**1.000**	5.7	1.7	.3	**1.2**	6.7
2021–22	VEF Rīga	4	4	28.0	**.515**	.000	.833	**7.3**	2.0	**1.3**	.8	9.8
2022–23	AEK Athens	**14**	14	10.1	.514	**.400**	.719	2.4	.2	.1	.2	4.6
2023–24	VEF Rīga	6	6	27.7	.451	.333	.778	5.0	**2.8**	1.2	**1.2**	**11.0**

=== Domestic leagues ===
Year	Team	League	GP	MPG	FG%	3P%	FT%	RPG	APG	SPG	BPG	PPG
2011–12	(Finland) Kouvot	Korisliiga	2	9.2	.286	.0	.0	2.0	.0	.0	.0	2.0
2012–13	(Finland) Kouvot	Korisliiga	7	8.2	.563	.545	.857	2.0	.4	.0	.4	4.3
2013–14	(Finland) Kouvot	Korisliiga	46	19.5	.420	.313	.800	2.3	.9	.5	.7	6.1
2014–15	(Finland) Kouvot	Korisliiga	43	20.0	.463	.377	.538	2.3	.8	.4	.9	6.6
2015–16	(Finland) Kouvot	Korisliiga	51	24.9	.437	.321	.651	5.0	1.1	.6	1.4	8.8
2016–17	(Czech Republic) USK Praha	CZ NBL	38	29.9	.457	.298	.769	5.4	1.8	1.0	1.3	10.1
2017–18	(Czech Republic) USK Praha	CZ NBL	31	29.0	.479	.314	.733	6.5	1.8	1.1	1.5	9.7
2018–19	(Spain) Gran Canaria B	Tercera FEB	26	21.0	.440	.333	.727	6.1	1.6	1.2	1.2	9.2

=== National team ===
Team	Tournament	Pos.	GP	PPG	RPG	APG
Finland	EuroBasket 2022	7th	7	6.6	3.4	1.4
Finland	2023 FIBA World Cup	21st	5	6.6	2.4	1.2
Finland	EuroBasket 2025	4th	6	1.8	2.5	1.0
