= 2014–15 Korisliiga season =

Korisliiga
- Season: 2014–15
- Teams: 11

Regular season
- Season MVP: (Finland) Teemu Rannikko (Finnish) (United States) Robert Arnold (Import)

Finals
- Champions: Kataja (1st title)
- Runners-up: Bisons Loimaa
- Third place: KTP
- Fourth place: Kauhajoen Karhu
- Finals MVP: (Finland) Teemu Rannikko

Statistical leaders
Points	(United States) Robert Arnold	22.3
Rebounds	(United States) Paul Carter	12.5
Assists	(Finland) Teemu Rannikko	8.3

The 2014–15 season was the 75th season of the Korisliiga, the highest professional basketball tier in Finland. The league champion qualified for the 2015–16 Eurocup regular season. Kataja won its first title in franchise history.

== Teams ==
Eleven teams participated in the Korisliiga this season. Lappeenrannan NMKY left the league because of its poor economic situation.

=== Budgets ===
Team	Budgets	Change from last year
Bisons Loimaa	820,000 €	– 30,000 €
Joensuun Kataja	675,000 €	–50,000 €
Helsinki Seagulls	630,000 €	Second division
Kouvot	520,000 €	+ 135,000 €
Kauhajoen Karhu	520,000 €	65,000 €
KTP	500,000 €	50,000 €
Tampereen Pyrintö	404,000 €	+ 75,000 €
Tapiolan Honka	396,000 €	+ 29,000 €
Namika Lahti	385,000 €	+ 55,000 €
Salon Vilpas	350,000 €	± 0 €
Korikobrat	300,000 €	10,000 €

== Regular season ==
Pos	Team	Pld	W	L	PF	PA	PD	Qualification or relegation
1	KTP	40	29	11	3302	3207	+95	Qualified for Playoffs
2	Kataja	40	27	13	3472	3192	+280	Qualified for Playoffs
3	Kauhajoen Karhu	40	27	13	3402	3212	+190	Qualified for Playoffs
4	Bisons Loimaa	40	24	16	3180	3102	+78	Qualified for Playoffs
5	Kouvot	40	24	16	3306	3175	+131	Qualified for Playoffs
6	Tampereen Pyrintö	40	20	20	3201	3116	+85	Qualified for Playoffs
7	Namika Lahti	40	17	23	2944	3012	−68	Qualified for Playoffs
8	Helsinki Seagulls	40	17	23	3082	3087	−5	Qualified for Playoffs
9	Korikobrat	40	13	27	3131	3375	−244	
10	Salon Vilpas	40	11	29	2977	3154	−177	
11	Tapiolan Honka	40	10	30	3076	3441	−365	Relegation

=== Rounds 1-20 ===
Home \ Away	BIS	HEL	HON	KAT	KAU	KOR	KOU	KTP	LAH	SAL	TAM
Bisons Loimaa		87–71	80–69	62–90	74–69	79–74	93–79	76–81	75–82	94–89	76–71
Helsinki Seagulls	84–64		91–67	90–85	67–72	69–60	74–79	81–84	86–88	86–83	76–73
Tapiolan Honka	57–91	95–87		88–93	85–103	81–66	72–64	85–87	79–64	71–85	90–103
Kataja Basket Club	81–86	88–64	88–74		77–89	85–73	87–78	89–100	87–80	84–68	92–76
Kauhajoen Karhu	97–91	92–87	94–79	90–88		86–89	90–59	96–91	94–70	91–78	96–75
Korikobrat	73–84	71–92	88–84	80–81	63–76		93–76	83–87	70–72	79–88	68–86
Kouvot	85–82	94–77	95–73	68–90	91–83	108–74		76–88	83–77	76–75	89–80
KTP-Basket	77–76	84–81	73–74	97–95	98–95	97–84	90–77		77–67	81–74	86–83
Namika Lahti	58–63	80–58	88–72	77–74	90–84	86–93	62–91	74–81		80–55	77–63
Salon Vilpas Vikings	61–73	81–60	80–70	75–82	74–79	94–83	62–79	73–85	61–68		72–52
Tampereen Pyrintö	88–71	69–78	90–67	78–87	78–67	94–81	78–84	85–83	81–51	77–53	

Legend: Blue = home team win; Yellow = draw; Red = away team win.

=== Rounds 21-40 ===
Home \ Away	BIS	HEL	HON	KAT	KAU	KOR	KOU	KTP	LAH	SAL	TAM
Bisons Loimaa		85–70	106–67	94–89	98–94	60–81	82–71	65–67	79–63	82–64	76–71
Helsinki Seagulls	89–71		88–74	70–83	64–76	89–55	76–65	81–87	59–70	75–60	72–75
Tapiolan Honka	79–88	72–73		99–87	79–90	79–88	78–74	87–96	53–62	80–103	77–106
Kataja Basket Club	95–83	87–78	97–78		95–81	106–87	77–91	82–68	94–76	87–74	87–81
Kauhajoen Karhu	88–83	85–78	72–79	63–87		88–83	104–61	90–71	85–59	86–83	95–82
Korikobrat	88–78	75–82	95–81	80–92	69–66		92–78	77–74	86–72	87–85	84–88
Kouvot	85–66	85–66	92–68	97–84	85–87	97–66		87–85	96–75	105–72	75–88
KTP-Basket	70–88	61–85	92–96	74–65	85–73	91–86	92–73		68–67	98–81	62–79
Namika Lahti	76–46	82–70	58–76	78–84	95–98	84–57	93–84	73–83		73–67	70–57
Salon Vilpas Vikings	75–81	67–83	86–88	55–82	78–82	92–75	52–91	67–69	77–57		82–77
Tampereen Pyrintö	84–91	76–75	78–74	93–89	94–56	88–85	81–83	81–82	66–80	76–75	

Legend: Blue = home team win; Yellow = draw; Red = away team win.

== Playoffs ==
Quarterfinals
1	KTP	3
8	Helsinki Seagulls	0
4	Bisons Loimaa	3
5	Kouvot	0
3	Kauhajoen Karhu	3
6	Tampereen Pyrintö	2
2	Kataja	3
7	Namika Lahti	2

Semifinals
1	KTP	2
4	Bisons Loimaa	3
2	Kataja	3
3	Kauhajoen Karhu	2

Finals
4	Bisons Loimaa	2
2	Kataja	3
Third place
1	KTP	1
3	Kauhajoen Karhu	0

== Awards ==
Award	Player	Team
Korisliiga MVP	(Finland) Teemu Rannikko	Joensuun Kataja
Korisliiga MVP	(United States) Robert Arnold	Joensuun Kataja
Korisliiga Finals MVP	(Finland) Teemu Rannikko	Joensuun Kataja
Coach of the Year	(Finland) Pekka Salminen	Joensuun Kataja
Sixth Man of the Year	(Finland) Petri Virtanen	Joensuun Kataja
Most Improved Player	(Finland) Joonas Lehtoranta	KTP
Rookie of the Year	(Finland) Marius van Andringa	Joensuun Kataja
Defensive Player of the Year	(Finland) Vesa Mäkäläinen	Namika Lahti
