= Jeb Ivey =

American basketball player (born 1980)

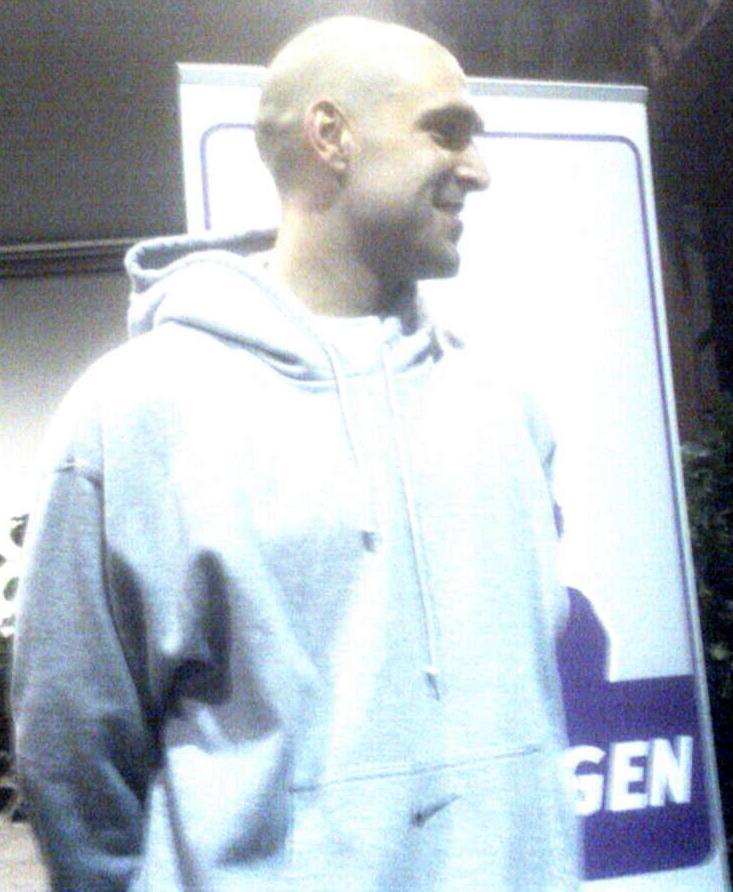
- Ivey in 2008

Personal information
- Born: November 7, 1980 (age 46) San Jose, California, U.S.
- Listed height: 188 cm (6 ft 2 in)
- Listed weight: 198 lb (90 kg)

Career information
- High school: Bellarmine College Preparatory (San Jose, California)
- College: West Valley (1999–2001); Portland State (2001–2003)
- Playing career: 2003–2019
- Position: Point guard
- Number: 5

Career history
- 2003–2004: KFÍ
- 2004–2005: Fjölnir
- 2005: Vancouver Volcanoes
- 2005–2007: Njarðvík
- 2007–2008: Göttingen
- 2008–2009: Eisbären Bremerhaven
- 2009–2010: Kataja
- 2010: Snæfell
- 2010–2011: KTP
- 2011–2013: Bisons Loimaa
- 2013–2014: Aix Maurienne
- 2014–2016: Denain Voltaire
- 2016–2018: Espoo United
- 2018–2019: Njarðvík

Career highlights
- 2× Finnish League champion (2012, 2013); 2× Icelandic League champion (2006, 2010); Icelandic Super Cup winner (2006); 2× Korisliiga Finals MVP (2012, 2013); Korisliiga Foreign Player of the Year (2012)

Jeb Mikel Ivey (born November 7, 1980) is an American former professional basketball player. He won the Icelandic championship twice, with Njarðvík in 2006, and with Snæfell in 2010. He also won the Finnish championship twice with Nilan Bisons Loimaa in 2012 and 2013 where he was named the Korisliiga Finals MVP both times.

From September 24, 2010, to December 6, 2013, he scored a three pointer in 177 consecutive games, setting a world record according to Guinness World Records.

== Career ==
In 2018, Ivey returned to Njarðvík where he played 11 years before. He retired from basketball following Njarðvík's first round loss against ÍR in the 2019 Úrvalsdeild playoffs. In 27 regular seasons and playoff games for Njarðvík, Ivey averaged 16.5 points and 5.0 assists per game while shooting 37.8% from the three point range. On April 1, following Njarðvík's first round loss to ÍR, Ivey announced his retirement from professional basketball. Ivey then started coaching at Valley Catholic High School in late 2022, where he earned coach of the year in the OSAA 3a division in 2023.

== Honours ==
=== Finland ===
==== Club ====
- Finnish Champion: 2012, 2013

==== Individual ====
- Korisliiga Finals MVP: 2012, 2013
- Korisliiga Foreign Player of the Year: 2012

=== Iceland ===
==== Club ====
- Icelandic Champion: 2006, 2010
- Icelandic Super Cup: 2006
- Icelandic Company Cup: 2006

== Personal life ==
Ivey is the son of Mitch Ivey, who won bronze in 200 meters backstroke at the 1972 Summer Olympics.
