= Aapeli Alanen =

Finnish basketball player (born 1996)

Bisons Loimaa
- Position: Shooting guard
- League: Korisliiga

Personal information
- Born: 5 March 1996 (age 30) Lahti, Finland
- Listed height: 2.01 m (6 ft 7 in)
- Listed weight: 80 kg (176 lb)

Career information
- Playing career: 2012–present

Career history
- 2012–2015: Namika Lahti
- 2015–2016: Bisons Loimaa
- 2016–2017: Korihait
- 2017–2019: BC Nokia
- 2019–2021: Kataja
- 2021: Basket Brno
- 2021–2022: SKN St. Pölten
- 2022–2023: KR Reykjavik
- 2023–2024: Kouvot
- 2024–present: Bisons Loimaa

Career highlights
- Korisliiga Most Improved Player (2019)

Aapeli Elmeri Ristonpoika Alanen (born 5 March 1996) is a Finnish professional basketball player who plays as a shooting guard for Bisons Loimaa in the Korisliiga.
