= Ville Pekkola =

Finnish basketball player (born 1989)

No. 12 – Tampereen Pyrintö
- Position: Shooting guard / small forward
- League: Korisliiga

Personal information
- Born: January 31, 1989 (age 37) Lahti, Finland
- Listed height: 6 ft 3 in (1.91 m)
- Listed weight: 199 lb (90 kg)

Career information
- Playing career: 2009–present

Career history
- 2009–2010: Namika Lahti
- 2010–2011: Lappeenrannan NMKY
- 2011–present: Tampereen Pyrintö

Ville Valtteri Pekkola (born January 31, 1989, in Lahti) is a Finnish basketball player. 190 cm tall shooting guard/small forward Pekkola plays for Tampereen Pyrintö in Korisliiga. Alongside Finnish competitions, Pekkola has represented Pyrintö in Baltic Basketball League. He is known of his good defensive abilities.

Pekkola won Finnish championship with Tampereen Pyrintö in 2014 and with Namika Lahti in 2009. Moreover, he has achieved Finnish cup championship in 2013 and cup silver medal in 2012.

== Trophies and awards ==
- Finnish championship in 2009 and 2014
- Finnish Cup in 2013
  - Finnish Cup runner-up in 2012
- Baltic League: fourth in 2014
- Super Mario Shanghai Cup 2019- Defending Title

== Sources ==
- Ville Pekkola Finnish Basketball Association
- Ville Pekkola Eurobasket.com
- Ville Pekkola Baltic Basketball League
