= Hannes Pöllä =

Finnish basketball player (born 1998)

Kataja
- Position: Center
- League: Korisliiga

Personal information
- Born: March 9, 1998 (age 28) Kuopio, Finland
- Listed height: 2.11 m (6 ft 11 in)
- Listed weight: 120 kg (265 lb)

Career information
- High school: Helsinki Basketball Academy (Helsinki, Finland)
- College: Oklahoma (2017–2019); UT Martin (2019–2021)
- NBA draft: 2021: undrafted
- Playing career: 2014–present

Career history
- 2014–2015: Namika Lahti
- 2015–2017: HBA-Märsky
- 2021–2023: Kouvot
- 2023–present: Kataja

Career highlights
- Korisliiga Rookie of the Year (2022)

Hannes Pöllä (born 9 March 1998) is a Finnish basketball player who plays as a center for Korisliiga team Kataja.
