= Demondre Harvey =

American basketball player

Demondre Harvey (Minden's Finest)
No. 17 – Indios de San Francisco
- Position: Power forward / center
- League: Dominican Republic League

Personal information
- Born: February 19, 1993 (age 33) Minden, Louisiana
- Listed height: 6 ft 6 in (1.98 m)
- Listed weight: 210 lb (95 kg)

Career information
- College: University of Louisiana at Monroe (2014–2016)
- NBA draft: 2017: undrafted
- Playing career: 2017–present

Career history
- 2016–2017: Oulun NMKY
- 2017–2018: BBC Bascharge Hedgehogs
- 2018–2019: Parque Sur de Concepcion del Uruguay
- 2019–present: Indios de San Francisco

Career highlights
- Dominican Republic League champion (2019)

Demondre J. Harvey (born February 19, 1993) is an American professional basketball player for Indios de San Francisco of the Dominican Republic League.

== Professional career ==
Harvey signed his first professional contract with Oulun NMKY of the Finnish Basketball League. On December 4, 2016, Harvey scored a career-high 26 points and grabbed a career-high 19 rebounds in a 85–74 win over Lahti. On August 31, 2019, Harvey signed with the Dominican Republic team, Indios de San Francisco.
