= Akeem Scott =

American basketball player (born 1983)

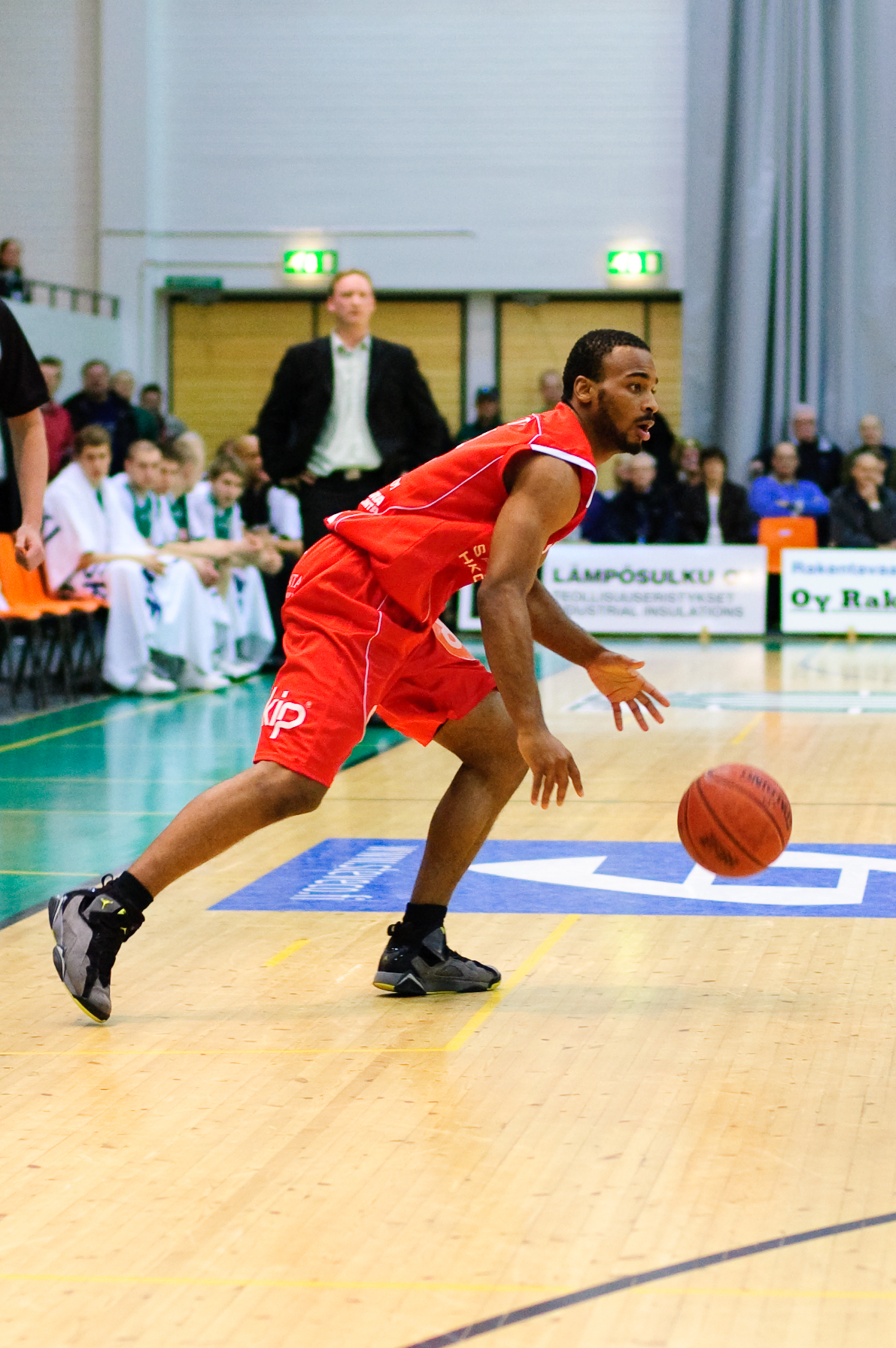
- Akeem Scott in 2010

Bogor Hornbills
- Position: Assistant coach
- League: IBL

Personal information
- Born: September 3, 1983 (age 43) Harlem, New York, U.S.
- Listed height: 185 cm (6 ft 1 in)
- Listed weight: 82 kg (181 lb)

Career information
- High school: Gar-Field (Woodbridge, Virginia)
- College: High Point University
- NBA draft: 2006: undrafted
- Playing career: 2006–present
- Number: 9
- Coaching career: 2024–present

Career history

Playing
- 2006–2007: Korihait
- 2007–2008: PuHu Juniorit
- 2008–2009: Espoon Honka
- 2009: BK Ventspils
- 2009–2010: Lappeenrannan NMKY
- 2011–2012: KK Mornar Bar
- 2012–2013: Pioneros de Quintana Roo
- 2013: Guaiqueríes de Margarita
- 2013: Bakersfield Jam
- 2014: Guaiqueríes de Margarita
- 2014–2015: Orangeville A's
- 2015–2016: AB Ancud
- 2016: Biguá
- 2016: London Lightning
- 2016–2017: Universidad de Concepción
- 2017–2018: Saigon Heat
- 2018: Lobos UAD Mazatlán
- 2018–2019: Laguneros de La Comarca
- 2019: Venados de Mazatlán
- 2019: Laguneros de La Comarca
- 2020: KW Titans
- 2021: Danang Dragons
- 2022–2023: RANS Simba Bogor
- 2024–2025: Borneo Hornbills/Bogor Hornbills

Coaching
- 2024-present: Borneo Hornbills/Bogor Hornbills (assistant coach)

Career highlights
- IBL All-Star MVP (2023); CIBACOPA All-Star (2019); First-team All-Chilean League (2017); Chilean League Defensive Player of the Year (2017); Korisliiga champion (2008); Korisliiga Finals MVP (2008); As assistant coach: IBL champion (2026)

Akeem Wayne Byron Scott (born September 2, 1983) is an American-Jamaican assistant basketball coach for the Borneo Hornbills of the Indonesian Basketball League (IBL). He played for the Jamaica national basketball team.

== Early life ==
A native of Harlem, Scott starred at Gar-Field Senior High School in Woodbridge, Virginia. He attended Garrett College for two years, earning All-American honors, before transferring to High Point ahead of his junior season.

== Professional career ==
Scott began his professional career with Finnish club Korihait in 2006 and averaged 17.3 points, 1.7 assists and 2.1 steals per game. He signed with second-tier club PuHu Juniorit the following season, recording 29.2 points and 2.9 assists per game across 23 games before he was moved up to first-tier club Espoon Honka in February 2008. He played in the final seven regular season games before leading his team to a Korisliiga league title, scoring 36 points and the game-winning basket to earn Finals MVP honors. He played with Espoon Honka again during the 2008–09 season, then appeared in two EuroCup games with Latvian team BK Ventspils in late 2009. Scott returned to Finland soon after, playing with Lappeenrannan NMKY in 2009–10. He subsequently played in Montenegro, Mexico and Venezuela.

Scott attended a two-day open tryout in Atlanta for the Bakersfield Jam in October 2014 and was invited to their training camp the following month. He made the final roster and averaged 10.4 points, three assists and 1.8 rebounds per game in five games.

Scott signed with the Brampton A's of Canada in November 2014.

He spent the 2015–16 season with AB Ancud in Chile, averaging 28.3 points, 6.3 rebounds and 4.3 assists across 30 games. He then signed with Uruguayan club Biguá in February 2016.

He played with Chilean team Universidad de Concepción in 2016–17, earning first-team all-league and defensive player of the year honors.

He joined the Saigon Heat in October 2017.

In August 2018, he signed with the Laguneros de La Comarca ahead of the 2018–19 LNBP season. He then played for the Venados de Mazatlán during the 2019 CIBACOPA season. He recorded 35 points, five assists and five rebounds in his team debut, a 93–90 victory against the Tijuana Zonkeys on April 12.

Scott signed with the Danang Dragons in Vietnam in June 2021.

Scott signed with the RANS Simba Bogor in Indonesia in March 2022

Scott signed with the Borneo Hornbills in Indonesia in March 2024
