= Jukka Matinen =

Finnish basketball player (born 1978)

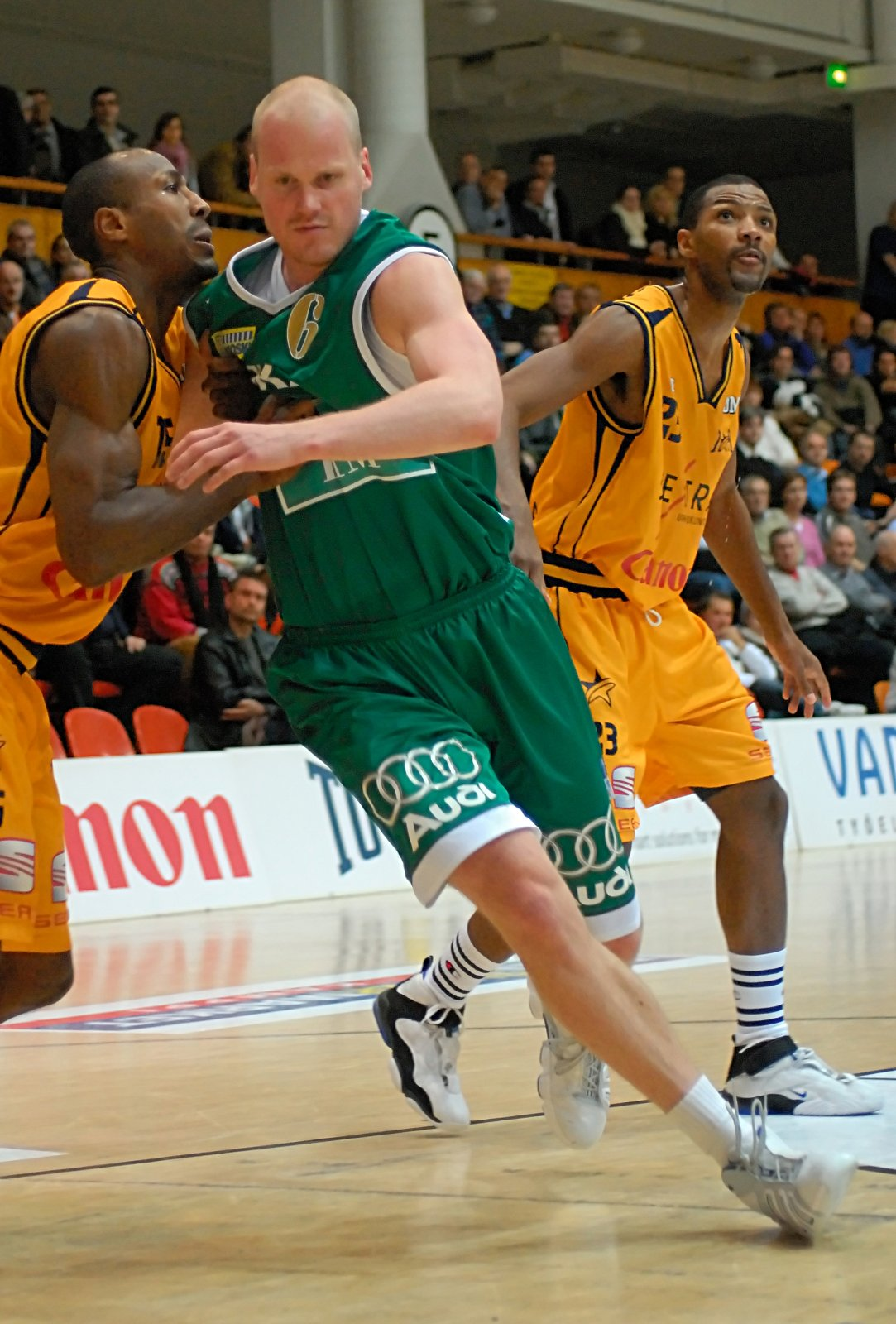
- Matinen playing for Espoon Honka in 2006

Personal information
- Born: 6 November 1978 (age 48) Kerava, Finland
- Listed height: 2.03 m (6 ft 8 in)
- Listed weight: 100 kg (220 lb)

Career information
- Playing career: 1995–2015
- Position: Small forward / power forward
- Number: 6

Career history
- 1995–1997: Pantterit
- 1997–1998: NMKY Helsinki
- 1998–2000: Torpan Pojat
- 2000–2002: Espoon Honka
- 2002–2006: Skyliners Frankfurt
- 2006–2011: Espoon Honka
- 2011–2015: KTP-Basket

Career highlights
- German Bundesliga champion (2004); 4x Finnish Korisliiga champion (2001, 2002, 2007, 2008); 3x Finnish Cup winner (1996, 2002, 2010); Korisliiga Finals MVP (2007)

Jukka Matinen (born 6 November 1978) is a Finnish former professional basketball player who played as a forward.

Matinen's professional career lasted for 20 years. In Finland, he played for Pantterit, NMKY Helsinki, Torpan Pojat, Espoon Honka and KTP-Basket, winning four Finnish championships with Honka.

During 2002–2006, Matinen played in Germany for Skyliners Frankfurt in EuroLeague and EuroCup. They won the German championship in 2004.

He also played 92 games for the Finland men's national basketball team.

== Career statistics ==
Legend
| GP | Games played | GS | Games started | MPG | Minutes per game |
| FG% | Field goal percentage | 3P% | 3-point field goal percentage | FT% | Free throw percentage |
| RPG | Rebounds per game | APG | Assists per game | SPG | Steals per game |
| BPG | Blocks per game | PPG | Points per game | **Bold** | Career high |

=== EuroLeague ===
| Year | Team | GP | GS | MPG | FG% | 3P% | FT% | RPG | APG | SPG | BPG | PPG | PIR |
|---|---|---|---|---|---|---|---|---|---|---|---|---|---|
| 2004–05 | Skyliners Frankfurt | 9 | 7 | 19.4 | .163 | .120 | .778 | 2.1 | .1 | .4 | .2 | 2.7 | –0.9 |

=== EuroCup ===
| Year | Team | GP | GS | MPG | FG% | 3P% | FT% | RPG | APG | SPG | BPG | PPG | PIR |
|---|---|---|---|---|---|---|---|---|---|---|---|---|---|
| 2002–03 | Skyliners Frankfurt | **10** | 1 | 16.2 | .364 | **.455** | .923 | 1.2 | .2 | .1 | **.2** | 5.4 | 2.6 |
| 2003–04 | Skyliners Frankfurt | 6 | **5** | **27.1** | **.467** | .448 | .667 | **3.3** | **1.0** | **.7** | **.2** | **9.8** | **7.5** |
| 2005–06 | Skyliners Frankfurt | 3 | 0 | 9.6 | .333 | .333 | **1.000** | .3 | – | – | – | 1.7 | 0.3 |
| Career | | 19 | 6 | 18.4 | .413 | .444 | .857 | 1.7 | .4 | .3 | .2 | 6.2 | 3.8 |
