= Pierre Jallow =

Gambian basketball player

Personal information
- Born: 8 August 1979 (age 47) The Gambia
- Listed height: 6 ft 8 in (2.03 m)

Career information
- College: William Jewell (2000–2004)
- NBA draft: 2004: undrafted
- Playing career: 2004–2017
- Position: Power forward / Center

Career history
- 2005–2006: Kouvot
- 2006–2007: Kohila SK
- 2007–2008: Lahti
- 2011: Keravan Energia
- 2012–2014: Raiders Basket
- 2015: Nilan Bisons Loimaa
- 2016: Raiders Basket
- 2017: Torpan Pojat

Pierre Jallow (born 8 August 1979) is a Gambian former professional basketball player. In 2015, he played for the Nilan Bisons Loimaa of Finland's Korisliiga and the VTB United League. He has received Finnish citizenship.

He organizes a camp in Gambia every summer for young kids who want a future in basketball.
