= LNB Pro B Finals MVP =

The LNB Pro B Finals Most Valuable Player (MVP) Award is an annual professional basketball award that is given by the second tier division in France, the LNB Pro B. It is awarded to the best player in a given finals series of the playoffs.

== Winners ==
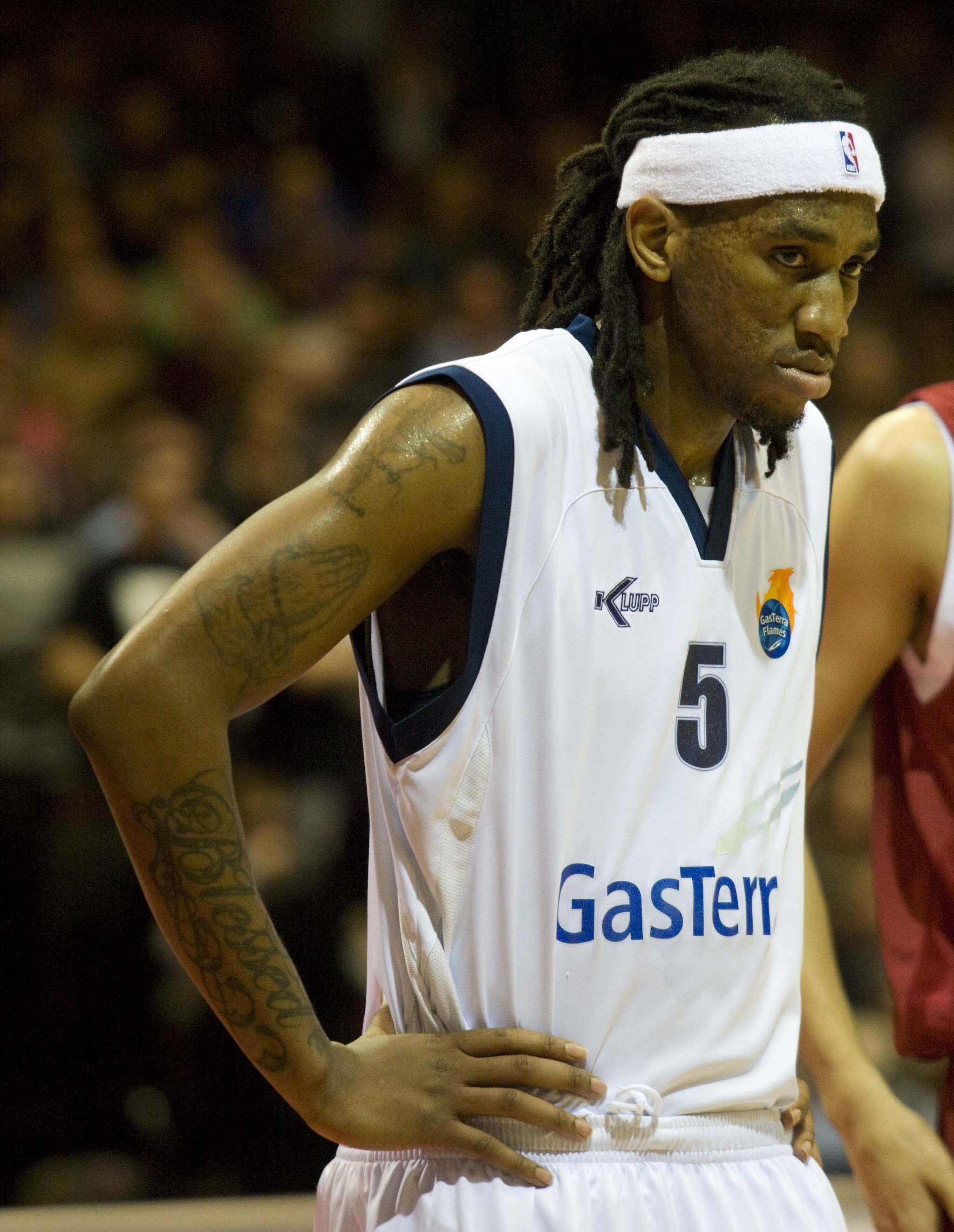
Tim Blue won the award in 2015, while playing with Antibes.

^	Denotes player who is still active in the Pro B
*	Inducted into the FIBA Hall of Fame
†	Denotes player whose team won championship that year
Player (X)	Denotes the number of times the player has received the award

Season	Player	Nationality	Club	Ref(s)
2004–05	Pero Vasiljević	Australia	Étendard de Brest	
2005–06	Ben Dewar	United States	Orléans Loiret	
2006–07	Jimmal Ball	United States	JA Vichy	
2007–08	Antwon Hoard	United States	Besançon BCD	
2008–09	Pierre-Yves Guillard	France	Poitiers Basket 86	
2009–10	Slaven Rimac	Croatia	Élan Béarnais Pau-Lacq-Orthez	
2010–11	Nate Carter	United States	JSF Nanterre	
2011–12	Chris Massie	United States	Limoges CSP	
2012–13	Tim Blue	United States	Antibes Sharks	
2013–14	Devin Booker	United States	JL Bourg-en-Bresse	
2014–15	Tim Blue (2)	United States	Antibes Sharks (2)	
2015–16	Christophe Léonard	France	JL Bourg	
2016–17	Jarvis Williams	United States	Boulazac Basket	
2018–19	Brandon Jefferson	United States	Orléans Loiret	
2021–22	Thomas Cornely	France	ADA Blois	
2022–23^	Antoine Eito	France	Élan Chalon	
2023–24	Tray Buchanan	United States	Stade Rochelais	
