= Hautala =

Hautala is a Finnish surname. Notable people with the surname include:

- Heidi Hautala (born 1955), Finnish politician
- Kari Hautala (1973–2016), Finnish basketball player
- Kristina Hautala (born 1948), Finnish singer
- Rick Hautala (1949–2013), American writer
- Tiia Hautala (born 1972), Finnish heptathlete
