= Vesa Mäkäläinen =

Finnish basketball player (born 1986)

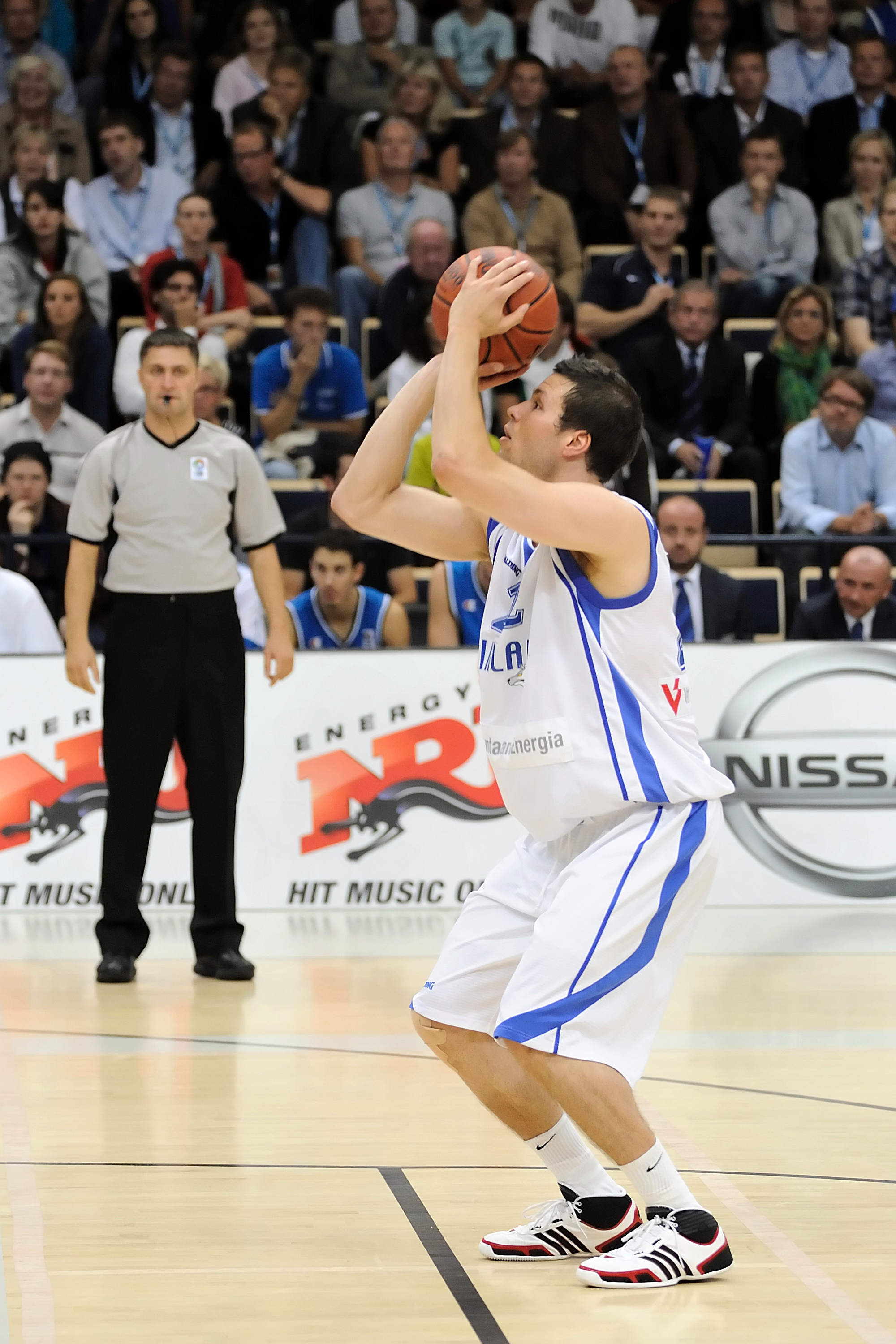
- Vesa Mäkäläinen playing for Finland in 2010

Personal information
- Born: September 3, 1986 (age 40) Hyvinkää, Finland
- Listed height: 6 ft 6.7 in (2.00 m)
- Listed weight: 209 lb (95 kg)

Career information
- Playing career: 2003–2021
- Position: Forward

Career history
- 2003–2009: Namika Lahti
- 2009–2010: Plannja
- 2010–2012: Kauhajoen Karhu
- 2012–2014: Kataja
- 2014–2015: Namika Lahti
- 2015–2016: Lahti Basketball
- 2016–2018: Kataja
- 2018–2021: Lahti Basketball

Career highlights
- 3x Korisliiga champion (2009, 2015, 2017); Korisliiga Finals MVP (2009); Korisliiga Rookie of the Year (2006); Korisliiga Sixth Man of the Year]] (2007); Korisliiga Most Improved Player (2009); 3x Korisliiga Defensive Player of the Year (2009, 2011, 2015)

Vesa Mäkäläinen (born September 3, 1986) is a Finnish former professional basketball player. Standing at 6 ft 6.7 in (2.00 m), he usually played as forward.

== Career statistics ==
=== National team ===
Team	Tournament	Pos.	GP	PPG	RPG	APG
Finland	EuroBasket 2011	9th	8	0.3	0.9	0.4
