= 2011–12 Korisliiga season =

Korisliiga
- Season: 2011–12
- Duration: September 28, 2011 – April 4, 2012
- Games played: 40
- Teams: 11

Regular season
- Top seed: Joensuun Kataja
- Season MVP: (Finland) Sami Lehtoranta (Domestic) (United States) Jeb Ivey (Foreign)

Finals
- Champions: Nilan Bisons Loimaa (1st title)
- Runners-up: Joensuun Kataja
- Third place: Torpan Pojat
- Fourth place: Tampereen Pyrintö
- Finals MVP: (United States) Jeb Ivey

Statistical leaders
Points	(Lithuania) Evaldas Zabas	21.9
Rebounds	(United States) Delvon Johnson	10.2
Assists	(Sweden) Andrew Pleick	6.4

Records
- Average attendance: 949 ▲

The Korisliiga 2011-2012 regular season started in September 2011. Nilan Bisons Loimaa eventually won its first national championship, by beating Joensuun Kataja 3–1 in the Finals.

== Participants ==
- Joensuun Kataja
- Kauhajoen Karhu
- Kouvot
- KTP-Basket
- Lappeenrannan NMKY
- Namika Lahti
- Nilan Bisons
- Salon Vilpas
- Tampereen Pyrintö
- Torpan Pojat
- UU-Korihait
Korisliiga 2011–12 – Club Locations

== Regular season ==
	Team	Pld	W	L	PF	PA	Qualification
1	Joensuun Kataja	40	31	9	83.4	74.7	Qualified for the Playoffs
2	Nilan Bisons	40	28	12	82.2	77.8	Qualified for the Playoffs
3	Tampereen Pyrintö	40	28	12	82.2	75.4	Qualified for the Playoffs
4	Kauhajoen Karhu	40	23	17	85.0	82.0	Qualified for the Playoffs
5	Torpan Pojat	40	21	19	83.4	80.7	Qualified for the Playoffs
6	KTP-Basket	40	18	22	83.9	84.9	Qualified for the Playoffs
7	Lappeenrannan NMKY	40	17	23	78.6	81.0	Qualified for the Playoffs
8	Salon Vilpas	40	16	24	74.0	77.9	Qualified for the Playoffs
9	Kouvot	40	14	26	73.5	77.4	
10	UU-Korihait	40	13	27	77.4	85.0	
11	Namika Lahti	40	11	29	78.9	86.0	

== Playoffs ==
Quarter Finals
1	Joensuun Kataja	3
8	Salon Vilpas	0
4	Kauhajoen Karhu	1
5	Torpan Pojat	3
2	Nilan Bisons	3
7	Lappeenrannan NMKY	0
3	Tampereen Pyrintö	3
6	KTP-Basket	0

Semifinals
1	Joensuun Kataja	3
5	Torpan Pojat	1
2	Nilan Bisons	3
3	Tampereen Pyrintö	2

Finals
1	Joensuun Kataja	1
2	Nilan Bisons	3
Third place
3	Tampereen Pyrintö	0
5	Torpan Pojat	1
