= Tyson Patterson =

American basketball player (born 1978)

Personal information
- Born: September 17, 1978 (age 48)
- Listed height: 5 ft 9 in (1.75 m)
- Listed weight: 165 lb (75 kg)

Career information
- High school: East Forsyth (Winston-Salem, North Carolina)
- College: Appalachian State (1996–2000)
- NBA draft: 2000: undrafted
- Playing career: 2000–2011
- Position: Point guard

Career history
- 2000: Dodge City Legend
- 2000–2001: TEC Liege
- 2001: Dodge City Legend
- 2001: Asheville Altitude
- 2001–2002: Grindavík
- 2003: Hickory Nutz
- 2004: Lausanne Morges Basket
- 2004: Florence Flyers
- 2004–2005: Brest
- 2005: Reims
- 2006: Brest
- 2006–2007: KR
- 2007–2008: ToPo Helsinki
- 2008–2009: Lobos Grises de la UAD Durango
- 2009: Lobos UAD Mazatlan
- 2009–2010: Lobos Grises de la UAD Durango
- 2010: Lausanne Morges Basket
- 2009–2010: Forssan Koripojat
- 2011: Guaros de Lara

Career highlights
- Belgian League All-Star Game (2001); French 2nd Division Foreign Players' MVP (2005); French 2nd Division champion (2005); Finnish League assists leader (2008); Icelandic League champion (2007); Icelandic League Playoffs MVP (2007); USBL champion (2000); SoCon Player of the Year (2000); 2× First-team All-SoCon (1999, 2000); SoCon tournament MVP (2000)

Tyson Patterson (born September 17, 1978) is an American former professional basketball player. He is 5'9", weighs 165 pounds and played the point guard position. Patterson played college basketball at Appalachian State University (ASU) between 1996–97 and 1999–2000. Through the 2011–12 season he still holds school records for assists in a game (14), season (218), and career (638), steals in a season (87), and field goal percentage in a game (100%, 12-for-12 shooting).

== Playing career ==
=== College ===
After graduating from East Forsyth High School in Winston-Salem, North Carolina, Patterson enrolled at ASU to play for the Mountaineers. In his first season, ASU finished with a 14–14 overall record and a third-place finish in the Southern Conference's (SoCon) North Division. During his final three seasons, however, Patterson was the leader in what ASU calls "perhaps the finest four-year span in [their] hardwood history." Between 1998 and 2000, the Mountaineers rattled off three consecutive North Division titles, made it to the SoCon tournament championship game every season (winning it in 2000, thereby earning their school's second-ever NCAA tournament bid), and compiled a three-year win–loss record of 65–25 (39–8 SoCon). Patterson led ASU in both assists and steals in each of his final three years, was a three-time All-SoCon Tournament Team selection, a two-time First Team All-SoCon (regular season) selection, and as a senior was named the SoCon Tournament MVP as well as the conference player of the year. In 2009, Patterson was inducted into the Appalachian State Hall of Fame.

=== Professional ===
As an undersized guard coming from a mid-major basketball program, no National Basketball Association (NBA) teams selected him in the 2000 NBA draft. Patterson carved out a professional career and professional career that took him to leagues all over the world as well as in the United States. Other than the United States, he has played for clubs in Belgium, Finland, France, Iceland, Mexico, Switzerland and Venezuela. In 2006-2007 he played with KR in the Icelandic Úrvalsdeild and led the league in assists per game (8.0). He helped KR win the Icelandic national championship that spring and was named the Playoffs MVP. Some of his other highlights include leading Finland's Korisliiga in assists per game (5.2) in 2007–08, winning France's LNB Pro B championship in 2004–05, and also being named LNB Pro B's "Foreign Players' MVP" that same season.
