= Teemu Rannikko =

Finnish basketball player (born 1980)

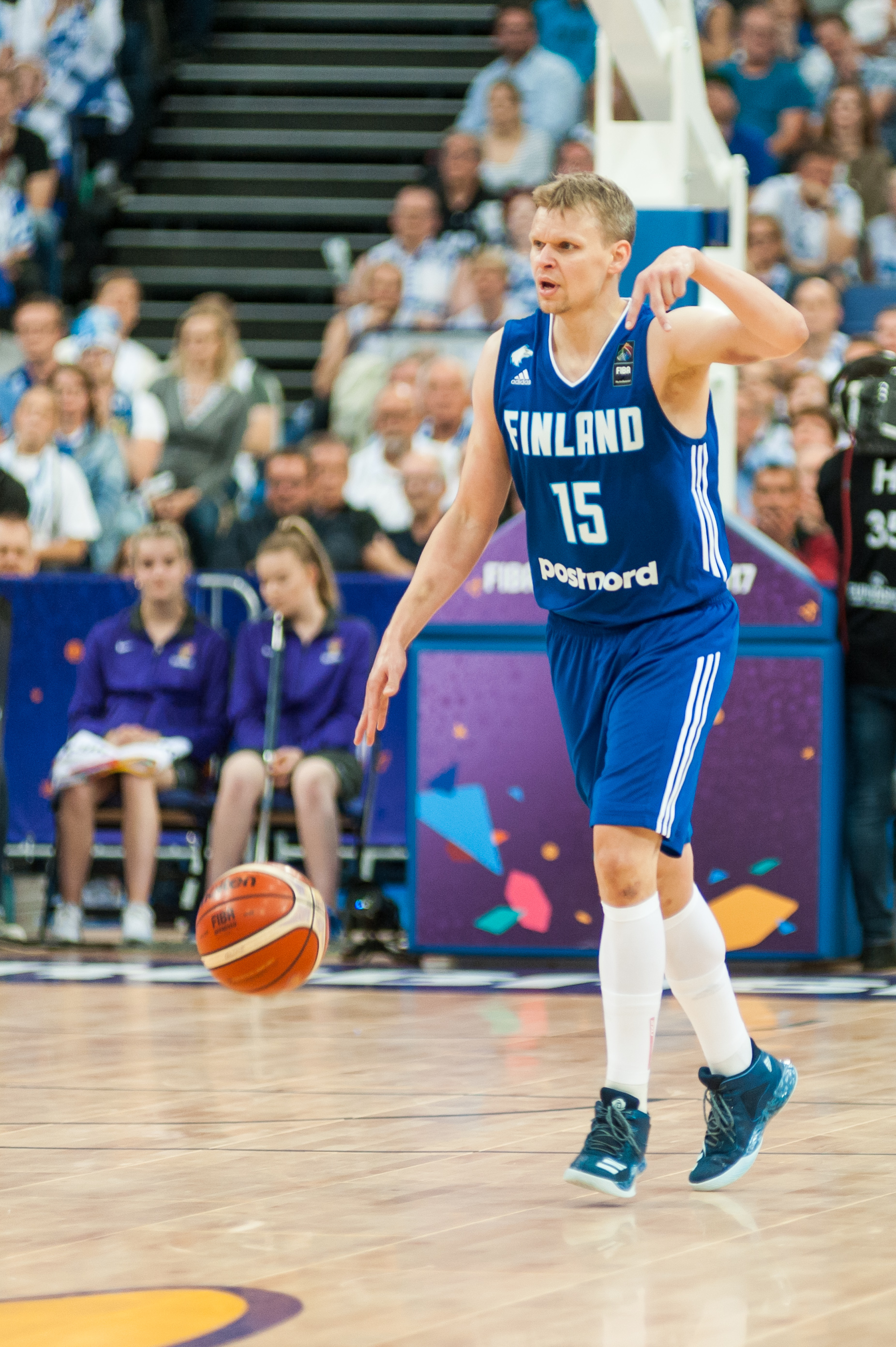
- Rannikko with Finland, during EuroBasket 2017.

Vilpas Vikings
- Title: Assistant coach
- League: Korisliiga

Personal information
- Born: September 9, 1980 (age 46) Turku, Finland
- Listed height: 6 ft 2.5 in (1.89 m)
- Listed weight: 195 lb (88 kg)

Career information
- NBA draft: 2002: undrafted
- Playing career: 1996–2021
- Position: Point guard / shooting guard
- Coaching career: 2021–present

Career history

Playing
- 1996–2000: Piiloset
- 2000–2002: Reggiana
- 2002–2003: Roseto
- 2003–2005: VL Pesaro
- 2005–2007: Olimpija Ljubljana
- 2007–2009: Khimki
- 2009–2010: Granada
- 2010–2012: Varese
- 2012–2013: Olimpija Ljubljana
- 2013–2017: Kataja
- 2017–2021: Vilpas Vikings

Coaching
- 2021–present: Vilpas Vikings (assistant)
- 2022–present: Finland (assistant)

Career highlights
- Russian Cup winner (2008); Slovenian League champion (2006); 2× Slovenian Cup winner (2006, 2013); FIBA Europe Cup assists leader (2016); Finnish Cup winner (2000); 4× Korisliiga MVP (1999–2000, 2015, 2016); 2× Korisliiga Finals MVP (2015, 2017); Korisliiga Most Improved Player (1998); 2× Korisliiga assists leader (2015–2016); 5× Finnish Player of the Year (2003, 2006–2007, 2009–2010)

Teemu Rannikko (born September 9, 1980) is a Finnish former professional basketball player who is currently an assistant coach of the Salon Vilpas in Korisliiga and the Finland national team. He is 1.89 m (6' 2 1/2") tall, and he weighs 88 kg (195 lbs.). He mainly played at the point guard position. At his peak, he was known as a good scorer and a steady defender.

== Professional career ==
Born in Turku, Finland, Rannikko made his breakthrough when he transferred to Scavoloni Pesaro, in 2004–05, and he made his EuroLeague debut that season. He had his most successful seasons over the next two years in Union Olimpija, where he was one of the key players for the team that played in the EuroLeague. In 2007–08, he moved to BC Khimki, where he played his first season as a sixth man successfully, but in the second season, an injury stopped Rannikko from breaking through, and he moved again after two years in Khimki. He spent the next three seasons in CB Granada and Pallacanestro Varese. On July 31, 2012, he returned to Union Olimpija, where he mostly played off the bench, so he later moved to his home club Kataja.

In 2013, Rannikko returned to Finland, when he signed with Joensuun Kataja. In the 2014–15 season, Rannikko was named the Korisliiga MVP and Korisliiga Finals MVP, after he was a member of Kataja's first championship team in history.

In 2017, Kataja won the Korisliiga again, after beating Vilpas Vikings 4–2 in the league's finals, and Rannikko won his second Finals MVP award.

== National team career ==
Rannikko was a long-time member of the senior Finnish national basketball team. With Finland, he played at the 2011 EuroBasket, the 2013 EuroBasket, the 2014 FIBA World Cup, and the 2017 EuroBasket.

== Career statistics ==
Legend
GP	Games played	GS	Games started	MPG	Minutes per game
FG%	Field-goal percentage	3P%	3-point field-goal percentage	FT%	Free-throw percentage
RPG	Rebounds per game	APG	Assists per game	SPG	Steals per game
BPG	Blocks per game	PPG	Points per game	PIR	Performance index rating
**Bold**	Career high

=== EuroLeague ===
Year	Team	GP	GS	MPG	FG%	3P%	FT%	RPG	APG	SPG	BPG	PPG	PIR
2004–05	Scavolini Pesaro	**19**	6	18.1	.333	.316	.864	1.3	1.2	1.1	.0	4.3	4.3
2005–06	Union Olimpija	14	**14**	**31.4**	**.445**	.364	**.865**	**2.1**	3.1	**1.4**	**.1**	12.8	**14.5**
2006–07	Union Olimpija	13	11	**31.4**	.395	**.368**	.800	1.4	**3.3**	1.1	.0	**14.6**	13.8
2012–13	Union Olimpija	9	0	17.5	.231	.235	**.900**	0.7	2.4	0.1	.0	2.8	2.3
Career		55	31	24.6	.388	.344	.836	1.4	2.3	1.0	.0	8.6	8.8

=== EuroCup ===
Year	Team	GP	GS	MPG	FG%	3P%	FT%	RPG	APG	SPG	BPG	PPG	PIR
2002–03	Roseto	10	**10**	**29.1**	**.443**	**.469**	.824	**1.2**	1.9	**1.6**	**.1**	**11.3**	**12.1**
2007–08	BC Khimki	8	1	23.2	.415	.423	.900	**1.2**	**2.2**	1.0	.0	10.1	12.0
2008–09	BC Khimki	**12**	0	15.7	.429	.400	**.917**	1.0	1.2	.7	.0	4.4	3.9
Career		30	11	22.1	.432	.438	.872	1.1	1.7	1.1	.0	8.2	8.8

=== National team ===
Team	Tournament	Pos.	GP	PPG	RPG	APG
Finland	EuroBasket 2011	9th	8	6.0	2.5	4.5
Finland	EuroBasket 2013	9th	6	6.3	1.5	1.7
Finland	2014 FIBA World Cup	22nd	5	5.0	1.0	3.2
Finland	EuroBasket 2017	11th	6	4.2	0.2	2.2
