= Robert Arnold (basketball) =

American basketball player (born 1988)

Personal information
- Born: November 12, 1988 (age 38) Lancaster, California
- Listed height: 6 ft 6 in (1.98 m)
- Listed weight: 187 lb (85 kg)

Career information
- High school: Lancaster (Lancaster, California)
- College: Antelope Valley (2007–2009); Boise State (2009–2011)
- NBA draft: 2011: undrafted
- Playing career: 2011–present
- Position: Small forward

Career history
- 2011–2013: Allianz Swans Gmunden
- 2013–2014: Namika Lahti
- 2014–2015: Kataja
- 2015–2016: Belfius Mons-Hainaut
- 2016–2017: Rethymno Cretan Kings
- 2017–2018: Hyères-Toulon
- 2018: JDA Dijon
- 2018–2019: Crailsheim Merlins

Career highlights
- Finnish League MVP (2015); Finnish League champion (2015); Finnish League scoring champion (2015); 2x Austrian Cup champion (2011, 2012); Austrian Supercup winner (2011)

Robert Arnold (born November 12, 1988) is an American former professional basketball player for the Crailsheim Merlins of Germany's Basketball Bundesliga.

== Personal life ==
Arnold was born in Lancaster, California. He attended Lancaster High School and went on to graduate from Boise State University in Boise, ID. Upon graduation, Arnold went on to have a successful career playing for multiple elite European leagues.

== Career ==
Arnold played two years for the Boise State Broncos and turned professional in 2011. After that he played two years for the Allianz Swans Gmunden, where he scored 15.5 points per game in his last season.

After his stance in Austria, he left for Namika Lahti in the Finnish Korisliiga. After a successful individual season, in which Arnold averaged 18.6 points a game, he signed with the Finnish powerhouse Kataja Basket Club for the 2014–15 season. With Kataja he won the Finnish Korisliiga.

On June 19, 2015, he signed a one-year deal with Belgian club Belfius Mons-Hainaut.

On July 23, 2016, Arnold joined Rethymno Cretan Kings. The following season, Arnold joined Hyères-Toulon of France's LNB Pro A.

In 2017, Arnold signed a two-year deal to play for JDA Dijon in France, but was released from the team in November 2018 for failing to be a team player and poor attitude. On December 12, 2018, he has signed contract with Crailsheim Merlins of Germany's Basketball Bundesliga. In May 2019, Arnold was officially released from the Merlins for poor attitude and inability to function after an elbow injury left him unable to shoot.
