= Gigantes de San Francisco =

- Leagues: Liga Nacional de Baloncesto
- Founded: 2005
- History: Indios de San Francisco de Macorís (2005–2026); Gigantes de San Francisco (2026-present)
- Arena: Polideportivo Mario Ortega
- Location: (Dominican Republic) San Francisco de Macorís
- Team colors: Orange, white, black
- President: (Dominican Republic) Stanley Javier
- Championships: 2 (2013, 2019)
- Website: indiossfm.com
Home	Away	Third

The Gigantes de San Francisco is a professional basketball team based in San Francisco de Macorís, Duarte, Dominican Republic. The team currently plays in the Dominican top division Liga Nacional de Baloncesto.

On March 17, 2026; The team announced it was rebranding to the Gigantes de San Francisco.

== Current roster ==
Indios de San Francisco de Macorís roster
Players
Coaches

Pos.	No.	Nat.	Name
PG	2	(Puerto Rico)	Maldonaldo, Hector
PG	14	(United States)	Foster, Greg
G	16	(Dominican Republic)	Tejada, Edgar
F	17	(United States)	Harvey, Demondre
PF/C	21	(United States)	Williams, Brian
PG	23	(Dominican Republic)	Rosa, Jorge
PG		(Dominican Republic)	Torres, Mike

Head coach

(Dominican Republic) Jose Santos Ceballos

Legend

- (C) Team captain
- Injured

- Roster
Updated: 8 August 2021

Note: Flags indicate national team eligibility at FIBA-sanctioned events. Players may hold other non-FIBA nationalities not displayed.

== Championships ==
Liga Nacional de Baloncesto (2× )
2013, 2019
