= Tim Blue =

American professional basketball player

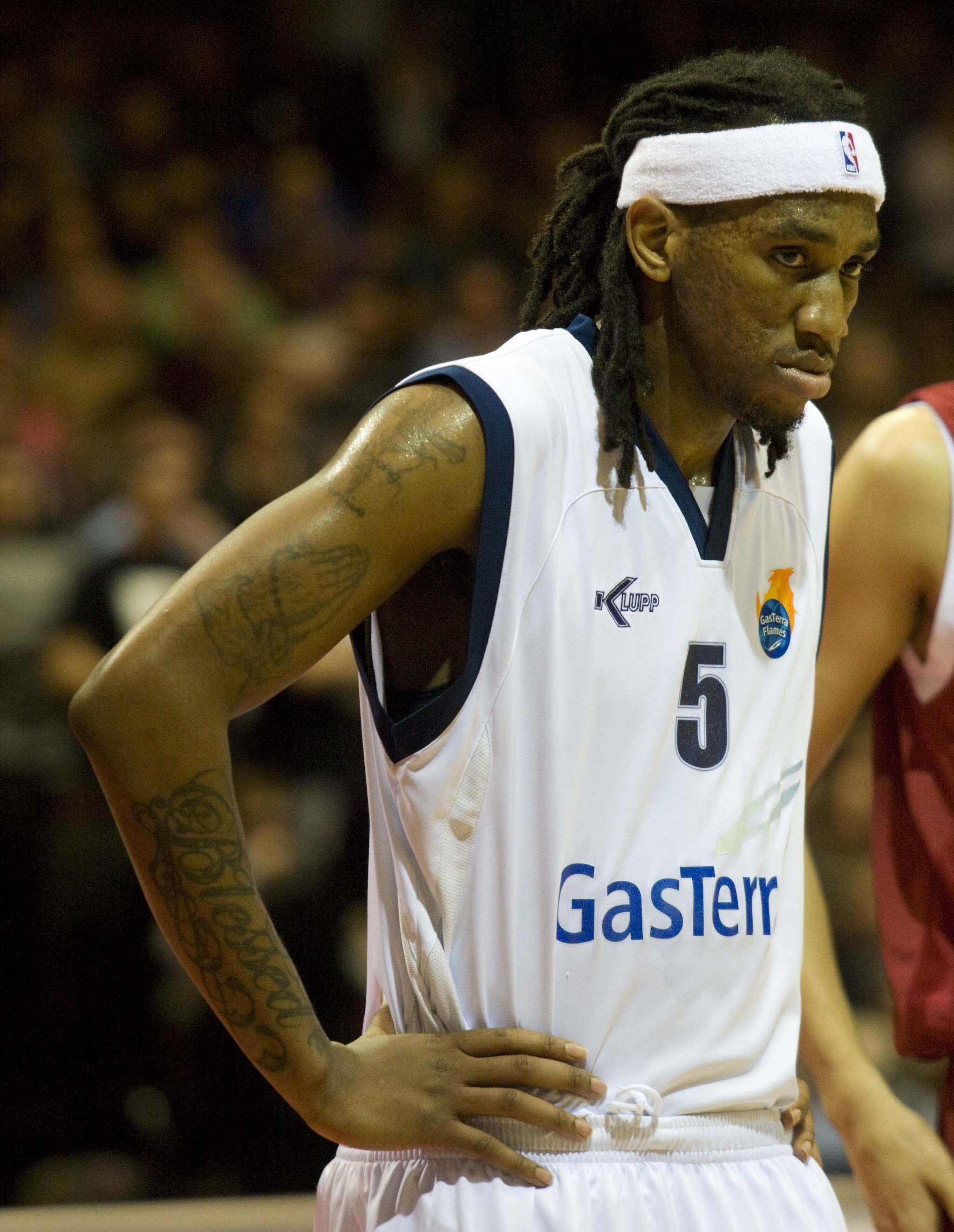
- Blue playing for GasTerra Flames in 2010

Personal information
- Born: July 10, 1984 (age 42) Palm Beach Gardens, Florida
- Listed height: 6 ft 9 in (2.06 m)
- Listed weight: 220 lb (100 kg)

Career information
- High school: Palm Beach Gardens (Palm Beach Gardens, Florida)
- College: Indian River State (2002–2004); Middle Tennessee (2005–2007)
- NBA draft: 2007: undrafted
- Playing career: 2007–2020
- Position: Power forward / small forward
- Number: 4

Career history
- 2007–2009: West-Brabant Giants
- 2009–2010: GasTerra Flames
- 2010–2011: Mitteldeutscher BC
- 2011: West-Brabant Giants
- 2011–2012: KTP
- 2012–2020: Antibes Sharks

Career highlights
- No. 4 retired by Antibes Sharks; Dutch League champion (2010); 3× Dutch All-Star Game (2008, 2010, 2011); French 2nd Division champion (2013); 2× French 2nd Division Finals MVP (2013, 2015); French 2nd Cup winner (2015); French 2nd Cup MVP (2015); 2× French League All-Star (2016, 2017)

Tim Blue (born July 10, 1984) is an American former basketball player. He is mostly known for his stint with the Antibes Sharks of the French LNB Pro A, where his number was retired. Blue usually played as power forward or small forward. In his professional career, he has played in the Netherlands, Germany, Finland and France.

== College ==
Blue played at Palm Beach Gardens High School before enrolling at Indian River State College in 2003. He spent the 2003-04 campaign with The River, before heading to Middle Tennessee State University, where he played from 2005 to 2007. In his two years with the Blue Raiders, he averaged 9.0 points and 4.9 rebounds a contest.

== Professional career ==
Blue won the Dutch basketball championship with the GasTerra Flames Groningen in 2010. In August 2010, he was signed by German Basketball Bundesliga side Mitteldeutscher BC. After returning to the Netherlands and a brief stint in Finland, Blue moved to France.

=== Antibes Sharks (2012–2020) ===
In the 2013–14 season, Blue played in the French Pro A with Antibes. Antibes team finished 16th and relegated back to the second division Pro B.

In the 2014–15 season, Blue finished 6th in the regular season with Antibes Sharks. In the Playoffs, Antibes won the Finals 2–0 over ASC Denain-Voltaire PH. After averaging 20 points per game in the Finals, Blue won his second LNB Pro B Finals MVP Award. In his eight years with the club, Blue scored a total of 3990 points and grabbed 1699 rebounds in league play. He had his jersey number retired at Antibes in March 2021.

Following eight years with the Antibes Sharks, he joined lower-league team Azuréa Golfe-Juan, just outside of Antibes.

== Honours ==
=== With club ===
GasTerra Flames

- Dutch Basketball League champion (1): 2009–10

Antibes Sharks

- LNB Pro B champion (1): 2012–13

=== Individual ===
- French 2nd Division Finals MVP (2): 2013, 2015
- DBL All-Star (3): 2008, 2010, 2011
- LNB Pro A All-Star (2): 2016, 2017
