= Martin Zeno =

American basketball player

Personal information
- Born: November 15, 1985 (age 41) Sulphur, Louisiana, U.S.
- Listed height: 6 ft 5 in (1.96 m)
- Listed weight: 205 lb (93 kg)

Career information
- High school: Sulphur (Sulphur, Louisiana)
- College: Texas Tech (2004–2008)
- NBA draft: 2008: undrafted
- Playing career: 2008–2019
- Position: Shooting guard

Career history
- 2009–2010: Erie BayHawks
- 2011: Powerade Tigers
- 2011–2013: Bisons Loimaa
- 2013–2014: Denain-Voltaire
- 2014–2016: Bisons Loimaa
- 2016–2018: CSM Oradea
- 2018–2019: Alba Fehérvár

Career highlights
- 2× Romanian League champion (2016, 2018); Romanian League Finals MVP (2016); Finnish League Foreign MVP (2013)

Martin Gilbert Zeno (born November 15, 1985) is an American professional basketball player.

== Professional career ==
In the 2012–2013 season Zeno earned Korisliiga Most Valuable Player in Finland. Eurobasket.com All-Finnish Korisliiga

On February 23, 2016, Zeno signed with CSM Oradea of the Liga Națională. He won the 2015–16 Romanian championship with Oradea. Because Oradea won the Romanian championship, Zeno and the team played in the Basketball Champions League the following season. On January 19, 2017, Zeno was named BCL Game Day MVP after scoring 42 points for an efficiency rating of 40 in a win over Kataja.

On 19 December 2018, he has joined Hungarian club Alba Fehérvár.
