= Finnish Women's Volleyball League =

Lentopallon Mestaruusliiga
- Current season, competition or edition: 2019–20 Volleyball Lentopallon Mestaruusliiga
- Sport: Volleyball
- Founded: 1956
- First season: 1956
- Administrator: SLRY
- No. of teams: 10 (2019–20)
- Country: Finland
- Continent: Europe
- Most recent champion: LP Viesti Salo (9th title)
- Most titles: Vaasan Vasama; LP Viesti Salo (9 titles)
- Level on pyramid: 1
- Relegation to: 2nd League
- Domestic cups: Finnish Cup; Finnish Super Cup
- International cups: CEV Champions League; CEV Cup; CEV Challenge Cup
- Website: https://www.mestaruusliiga.fi/

The Finnish Women's Volleyball League is a women's volleyball competition organized by the Finnish Volleyball Federation (Suomen Lentopalloliitto Ry-SLRY), it was created in 1956.

== History ==
The 2018/19 League season was played in a regular season mode with a total of ten teams of which 8 are qualified for a title deciding Playoffs. The 2019/20 season was cancelled due to COVID-19 spread in the country. Vaasan Vasama and LP Viesti Salo are the most titled ones with 9 titles each.

== List of Champions ==
Years	(gold) Gold	(silver) Silver	(bronze) Bronze
1957	Eiran Riento	Lepakot Hyvinkää	Helsingin Ponnistus
1958	Helsingin Riento	Eiran Riento	Tikkurilan Tikka
1959	Käpylän Lentopalloilijat	Koiton Riento	Tampereen Veikot
1960	Tampereen Veikot	Helsingin Ponnistus	Käpylän Lentopalloilijat
1961	Käpylän Lentopalloilijat	Tampereen Veikot	Koiton Riento
1962	Helsingin Ponnistus	Tampereen Veikot	Kalevan Lentopallo Tampere
1963	Käpylän Lentopalloilijat	Tampereen Veikot	Koiton Riento
1964	Käpylän Lentopalloilijat	Kalevan Lentopallo Tampere	Kimmo Lahti
1965	Käpylän Lentopalloilijat	Kimmo Lahti	Kalevan Lentopallo Tampere
1966	Käpylän Lentopalloilijat	Koiton Riento	Kimmo Lahti
1967	Koiton Riento	Kimmo Lahti	Käpylän Lentopalloilijat
1968	Kimmo Lahti	Käpylän Lentopalloilijat	Koiton Riento
1969	Wartti Helsinki	Lautta-Pojat Helsinki	Kimmo Lahti
1970	Wartti Helsinki	Koiton Riento	Kimmo Lahti
1971	Helsingin Elite	Wartti Helsinki	Kimmo Lahti
1972	Wartti Helsinki	Lautta-Pojat Helsinki	Helsingin Elite
1973	Kimmo Lahti	PPS Helsinki	Helsingin Elite
1974	Kimmo Lahti	PPS Helsinki	Luolajan Kajastus Hämeenlinna
1975	Karhulan Veikot	Kimmo Lahti	Helsingin Kiri-60
1976	Helsingin Kiri-60	Karhulan Veikot	Kimmo Lahti
1977	Jyväskylän Pesä-Veikot	Helsingin Kiri-60	Karhulan Veikot
1978	Karhulan Veikot	Jyväskylän Pesä-Veikot	Luolajan Kajastus Hämeenlinna
1979	Karhulan Veikot	Euran Raiku	Luolajan Kajastus Hämeenlinna
1980	Karhulan Veikot	Euran Raiku	Helsingin Kiri-60
1981	Karhulan Veikot	Euran Raiku	Oriveden Ponnistus
1982	Jyväskylän Pesä-Veikot	Karhulan Veikot	Euran Raiku
1983	Jyväskylän Pesä-Veikot	Kaavin Kaiku	Euran Raiku
1984	Euran Raiku	Jyväskylän Pesä-Veikot	Kauhajoen Karhu
1985	Euran Raiku	Vaasan Vasama	Jyväskylän Pesä-Veikot
1986	Vaasan Vasama	Jyväskylän Pesä-Veikot	Korian Ponsi
1987	Vaasan Vasama	Haukiputaan Heitto	Karhulan Veikot
1988	Vaasan Vasama	Karhulan Veikot	Haukiputaan Heitto
1989	Vaasan Vasama	Euran Raiku	Haukiputaan Heitto
1990	Hesa Helsinki	Valkealan Kajo	Korian Ponsi
1991	Vaasan Vasama	Korian Ponsi	Blue Eyes Team Jyväskylä
1992	Vaasan Vasama	Korian Ponsi	Valkealan Kajo
1993	Vaasan Vasama	Valkealan Kajo	Korian Ponsi
1994	Vaasan Vasama	Valkealan Kajo	Korian Ponsi
1995	Palokan Pyry	Joensuun Prihat	Vaasan Vasama
1996	Vaasan Vasama	Palokan Pyry	Joensuun Prihat
1997	Oriveden Ponnistus	Euran Raiku	Pieksämäki Volley
1998	Valkealan Kajo	Oriveden Ponnistus	Euran Raiku
1999	Euran Raiku	Valkealan Kajo	Hämeenlinnan Tarmo-Volley
2000	Hämeenlinnan Tarmo-Volley	Euran Raiku	Joensuun Prihat
2001	Hämeenlinnan Tarmo-Volley	LP Viesti Salo	Joensuun Prihat
2002	Hämeenlinnan Tarmo-Volley	Joensuun Prihat	Somero
2003	Hämeenlinnan Tarmo-Volley	LP Viesti Salo	Somero
2004	Pieksämäki Volley	Hämeenlinnan Tarmo-Volley	Oriveden Ponnistus
2005	Vanajan Racing Club	Oriveden Ponnistus	Pieksämäki Volley
2006	Vanajan Racing Club	LP Viesti Salo	Pihtiputaan Ploki
2007	Vanajan Racing Club	LP Viesti Salo	Oriveden Ponnistus
2008	Vanajan Racing Club	Oriveden Ponnistus	LP Viesti Salo
2009	LP Viesti Salo	Oriveden Ponnistus	Vanajan Racing Club
2010	LP Viesti Salo	HPK Naiset	Oriveden Ponnistus
2011	LP Viesti Salo	Oriveden Ponnistus	HPK Naiset
2012	LP Viesti Salo	HPK Naiset	LP Kangasala
2013	LP Viesti Salo	LP Kangasala	Oriveden Ponnistus
2014	LP Viesti Salo	Oriveden Ponnistus	HPK Naiset
2015	LP Viesti Salo	LP Kangasala	HPK Naiset
2016	HPK Naiset	LP Viesti Salo	Oriveden Ponnistus
2017	LP Viesti Salo	HPK Naiset	Oriveden Ponnistus
2018	HPK Naiset	LP Viesti Salo	LP Kangasala
2019	LP Viesti Salo	Hämeenlinnan Lentopallokerho	Pölkky Kuusamo
2020	Tournament Cancelled		

== Table by club ==
rk.	Club	Titles	City	Years Won
1	Vaasan Vasama	9	Vaasa	(1986—1989), (1991—1994), 1996
=	LP Viesti Salo	9	Salo	(2009—2015), 2017, 2019
3	Hämeenlinnan Tarmo-Volley	8	Hämeenlinna	(2000—2003), (2005—2008)
4	Käpylän Lentopalloilijat	6	Käpylä	1959, 1961, (1963—1966)
5	Karhulan Veikot	5	Karhula	1975, (1978—1981)
6	Kimmo Lahti	3	Lahti	1968, (1973—1974)
=	Wartti Helsinki	3	Helsinki	1969, 1970, 1972
=	Jyväskylän Pesä-Veikot	3	Jyväskylä	1977, (1982—1983)
=	Euran Raiku	3	Eura	(1984—1985), 1999
10	Helsingin Ponnistus	2	Helsinki	1958, 1962
=	HPK Naiset	2	Hämeenlinna	2016, 2018
12	Eiran Riento	1	Eira	1957
=	Tampereen Veikot	1	Tampere	1960
=	Koiton Riento	1	Eira	1967
=	Helsingin Elite	1	Helsinki	1971
=	Helsingin Kiri-60	1	Helsinki	1976
=	Hesa Helsinki	1	Helsinki	1990
=	Palokan Pyry	1	Jyväskylä	1995
=	Oriveden Ponnistus	1	Orivesi	1997
=	Valkealan Kajo	1	Valkeala	1998
=	Pieksämäki Volley	1	Pieksämäki	2004
