= Kari Hautala =

Finnish basketball player (1973–2016)

Personal information
- Born: 10 March 1973 Helsinki, Finland
- Died: 5 July 2016 (aged 43)
- Listed height: 6 ft 4.5 in (1.94 m)

Career history
- 1990–1999: Torpan Pojat

Career highlights
- SM-sarja Defensive Player of the Year (1998); 2× SM-sarja Sixth Man of the Year (1994, 1998); 3× SM-sarja champion; 3× Finnish Cup champion

Kari Hautala (10 March 1973 – 5 July 2016) was a Finnish basketball player.

The 194-centimetre-tall (6 ft 4 in) Hautala played his whole SM-sarja career for Torpan Pojat winning three Finnish championships and three Finnish Cup championships. He also played three seasons with ToPo at the EuroCup/Saporta Cup achieving Round of 16 in 1997–98 season at best and capped 15 times for Finland men's national team. Hautala was awarded as Korisliiga Defensive Player of the Year in 1998 and Korisliiga Sixth Man of the Year in 1994 and 1998.

Hautala died of heart attack on 5 July 2016 at 43 years of age.

== Sources ==
- "Kari Hautala". Finnish Basketball Association.
- "National Team Statistics". Finnish Basketball Association. Archived from the original on 7 August 2016.
