= Marcus Jackson =

American football player (born 1986)

No. 5, 8
- Position: Quarterback

Personal information
- Born: November 30, 1986 (age 39); Houston, Texas
- Listed height: 6 ft 1 in (1.85 m)
- Listed weight: 215 lb (98 kg)

Career information
- High school: Houston (TX) Westside
- College: TCU
- NFL draft: 2010: undrafted

Career history
- Wichita Wild (2012); Texas Revolution (2013); San Antonio Talons (2013–2014); Wichita Falls Nighthawks (2015)

Career AFL statistics
- Comp–Att: 9–15
- Passing Yards: 117
- TD–INT: 1–1
- Rushing Yards: 43
- Rushing TDs: 3
- Stats at ArenaFan.com

Marcus Jackson (born November 30, 1986) is an American former professional football quarterback. Jackson played college football for the TCU Horned Frogs football team.

== Early life ==
Jackson attended Westside High School in Houston, Texas. While at Westside, Jackson was a member of the football team.

College recruiting
Name	Hometown	School	Height	Weight	40^{‡}	Commit date
Marcus Jackson; QB	Houston, Texas	Westside H.S.	6 ft 1 in (1.85 m)	195 lb (88 kg)	4.77	Jan 31, 2005
Marcus Jackson; QB	Recruit ratings: Scout: Rivals: (NR)					
Overall recruit ranking: Scout: -- (QB) Rivals: -- (QB), -- (TX) ESPN: -- (QB)
Note: In many cases, Scout, Rivals, 247Sports, On3, and ESPN may conflict in their listings of height and weight.; In these cases, the average was taken. ESPN grades are on a 100-point scale.; Sources: "TCU Football Commitment List (26)". Rivals.; "TCU College Football Recruiting Commits". Scout.; "Scout.com Team Recruiting Rankings". Scout.; "2005 Team Ranking". Rivals.com.

Jackson committed to Texas Christian University on January 31, 2005. He choose TCU over football scholarships from Baylor, Houston, Louisiana Tech & Louisiana–Lafayette.

== College career ==
Jackson redshirted his freshman year at TCU, before finding himself as the back up to Jeff Ballard during his redshirt-freshman season. In 2007, Jackson was giving the opportunity to compete for the starting quarterback job, but lost the battle to Andy Dalton. Jackson spent the duration of his career as a backup to Dalton, with the exception of starting two games in 2008 during a Dalton injury.

=== Statistics ===
Through end of the 2009 season, Jackson's college statistics are as follows:

		Passing							Rushing		
Season	Team	Rating	Att	Comp	Pct	Yds	TD	INT	Att	Yds	TD
2006	TCU	143.2	44	26	59.1	386	2	1	24	53	0
2007	TCU	107.0	69	35	50.7	368	3	1	58	187	2
2008	TCU	116.4	62	35	56.5	372	3	2	70	384	4
2009	TCU	361.6	2	2	100.0	23	1	0	18	71	0
	Totals	122.2	177	98	55.4	1,149	9	4	170	695	6

== Professional career ==
Jackson signed to play indoor football for the Wichita Wild of the Indoor Football League (IFL) for the 2012 season. Jackson helped the Wild finish with an 8-6 record during the regular season, after the team started 0-4. Jackson threw for 19 touchdowns, as well as running in 3 more touchdowns.

Jackson played the 2013 indoor season with the expansion Texas Revolution, also of the IFL. The Revolution finished a disappointing 5-9.

Jackson was signed by the San Antonio Talons of the Arena Football League just days prior to the Talon's final game of the season. Following practice, Jackson was named the backup to Robert Kent, but with Kent struggling during the game, Jackson came in for Kent, rushing for 3 touchdowns and throwing for another, upsetting the Philadelphia Soul.

In November 2014, Jackson signed with the Wichita Falls Nighthawks of the IFL.
