= Damon Williams =

American basketball player

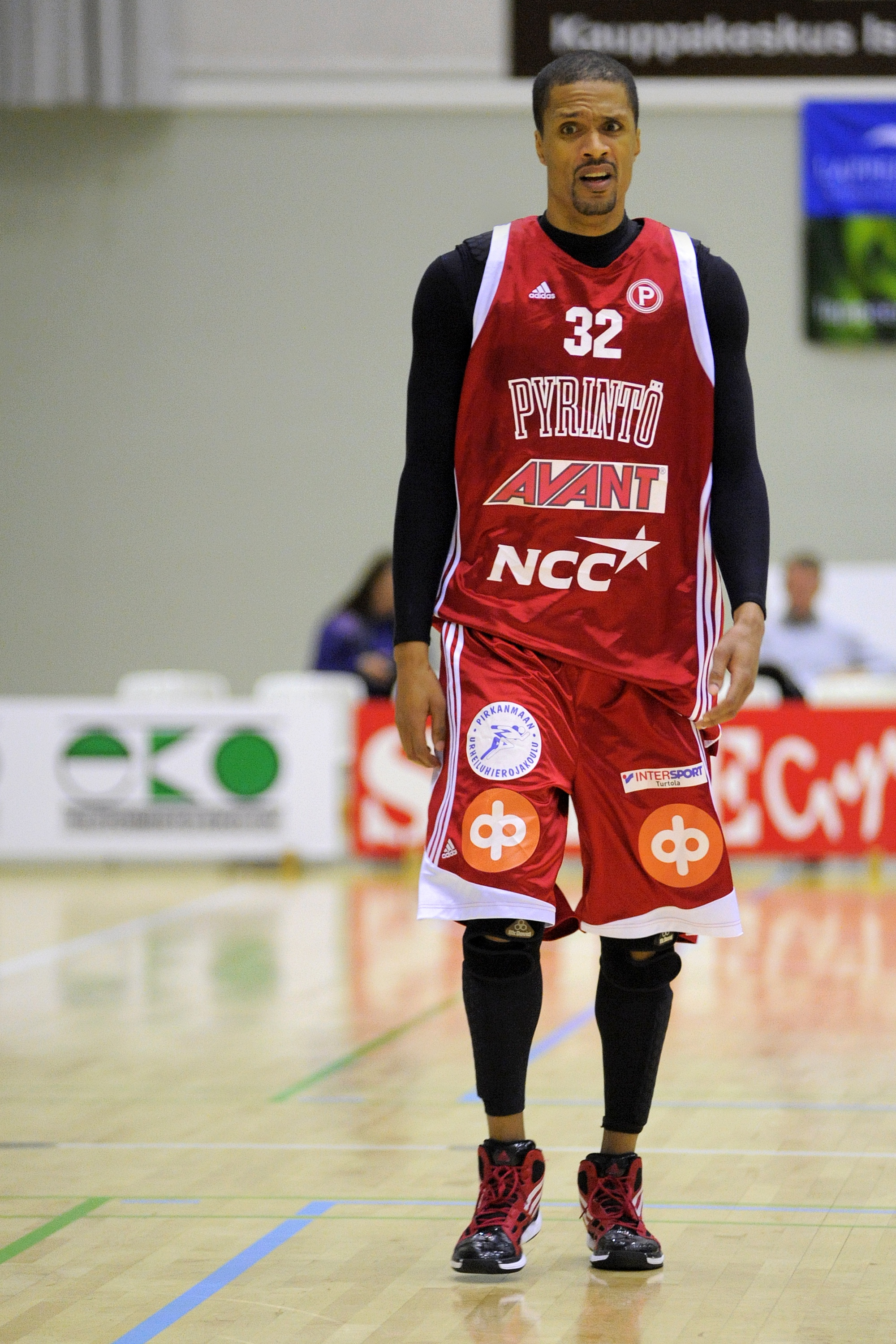
- Williams for Pyrintö in 2011

Personal information
- Born: December 13, 1973 (age 52) Seattle, Washington
- Listed height: 6 ft 7 in (2.01 m)
- Listed weight: 205 lb (93 kg)

Career information
- College: CSU–Pueblo (1996–1998)
- NBA draft: 1998: undrafted
- Playing career: 1998–2018
- Position: Power forward

Career history
- 1998–1999: Dakota Wizards
- 1999–2001: Tampereen Pyrintö
- 2001–2002: Albacomp
- 2002–2003: Bignami Castelmaggiore
- 2003–2004: Robur Osimo
- 2004–2005: Air Avellino
- 2005–2006: Biella
- 2006–2007: Udine
- 2007–2008: Tampereen Pyrintö
- 2008–2009: KTP
- 2009–2016: Tampereen Pyrintö
- 2016–2017: Kobrat
- 2017–2018: Pyrintö II

Career highlights
- 3x Korisliiga champion (2010, 2011, 2014); Finnish Cup champion (2013); 2x Korisliiga MVP (2001, 2011); 3x Korisliiga Finals MVP (2010, 2011, 2014)

Damon Williams (born December 13, 1973) is an American former professional basketball player from Seattle. He achieved notable success playing for Tampereen Pyrintö in the Finnish Korisliiga. During his professional playing career he also played multiple seasons in Italy.

Pyrintö retired Williams′ jersey #32 in December 2018.

== Personal life ==
Williams has lived in Finland since 1999. He married a Finnish woman named Eva in Las Vegas in 2003. The couple had met at a restaurant in Tampere in 1999, three weeks after Williams arrived in Finland. They have three children: a son named Kion, and two daughters named Kenisha and Kianna. Kion and Kenisha have played basketball at the top adult league level.

Williams first applied for Finnish citizenship in 2004 in order to play for the Finnish national team, but he failed the language test.

== Honors ==
- Jersey #32 retired by Pyrintö
- 3x Korisliiga (2010–2011, 2014)
- Finnish Cup (2013)
- 2x Finnish League MVP (2001, 2011)
- 3x Finnish Finals MVP (2010–2011, 2014)
