= Petri Virtanen =

Finnish basketball player

Kataja
- Position: Head coach

Personal information
- Born: September 19, 1980 (age 46) Jyväskylä, Finland
- Listed height: 183 m (600 ft 5 in)
- Listed weight: 77 kg (170 lb)

Career information
- Playing career: 1998–present

Career history

Playing
- 1998–2000: Säynätsalon Riento
- 2001–2003: BC Jyväskylä
- 2003: TTÜ/A. Le Coq
- 2003–2004: Solna Vikings
- 2004–2005: Porvoon Tarmo
- 2005–2007: Kataja
- 2007–2008: Lappeenrannan NMKY
- 2008–2016: Kataja

Coaching
- 2018–2020: Kataja (assistant)
- 2020–present: Kataja

Career highlights
- As player: Korisliiga champion (2015); 3x Finnish Cup winner (2008, 2011, 2012); Estonian Cup winner (2003); FIBA EuroCup All-Star (2008); 2x Korisliiga MVP (2003, 2006); 2x Korisliiga Sixth Man of the Year (2013, 2015); Korisliiga Most Improved Player (2002); As coach: Finnish Cup winner (2023)

Petri Virtanen (born 18 September 1980) is a Finnish basketball coach and a former basketball player who played as a point guard. He stands 1.83 m tall and is currently working as a head coach of Joensuun Kataja in Korisliiga.

Virtanen was a member of the Finland national basketball team. In FIBA EuroCup of 2007–08, playing for Lappeenrannan NMKY, he was one of the best scorers of the tournament averaging 16.2 points per game. While playing in Finnish Korisliiga, he won nine medals in the league in total.

He has also coached the Finland U18 national team.

In 2018, he started as an assistant coach of Kataja, and in 2020, he was named the new head coach of the team.

== Career statistics ==
=== National team ===
Team	Tournament	Pos.	GP	PPG	RPG	APG
Finland	EuroBasket 2011	9th	5	3.4	1.2	0.4
