= Bisons Loimaa =

LoKoKo Bisons Loimaa
- Leagues: Korisliiga
- Founded: 1964
- History: Loimaan Korikonkarit (1964–2011); Nilan Bisons Loimaa (2011–2015); Bisons Loimaa (2015–2018); LoKoKo Bisons Loimaa (2018–present)
- Arena: Loimaa Sports Center
- Capacity: 1,500
- Location: Loimaa, Finland
- Team colors: Red, White, Navy
- Head coach: Konsta Mastomäki
- Championships: 2 Finnish Leagues
- Website: bisons.fi
Home	Away

LoKoKo Bisons Loimaa is a Finnish professional basketball club that is based in Loimaa.

== History ==
Logo with Nilan as the main sponsor

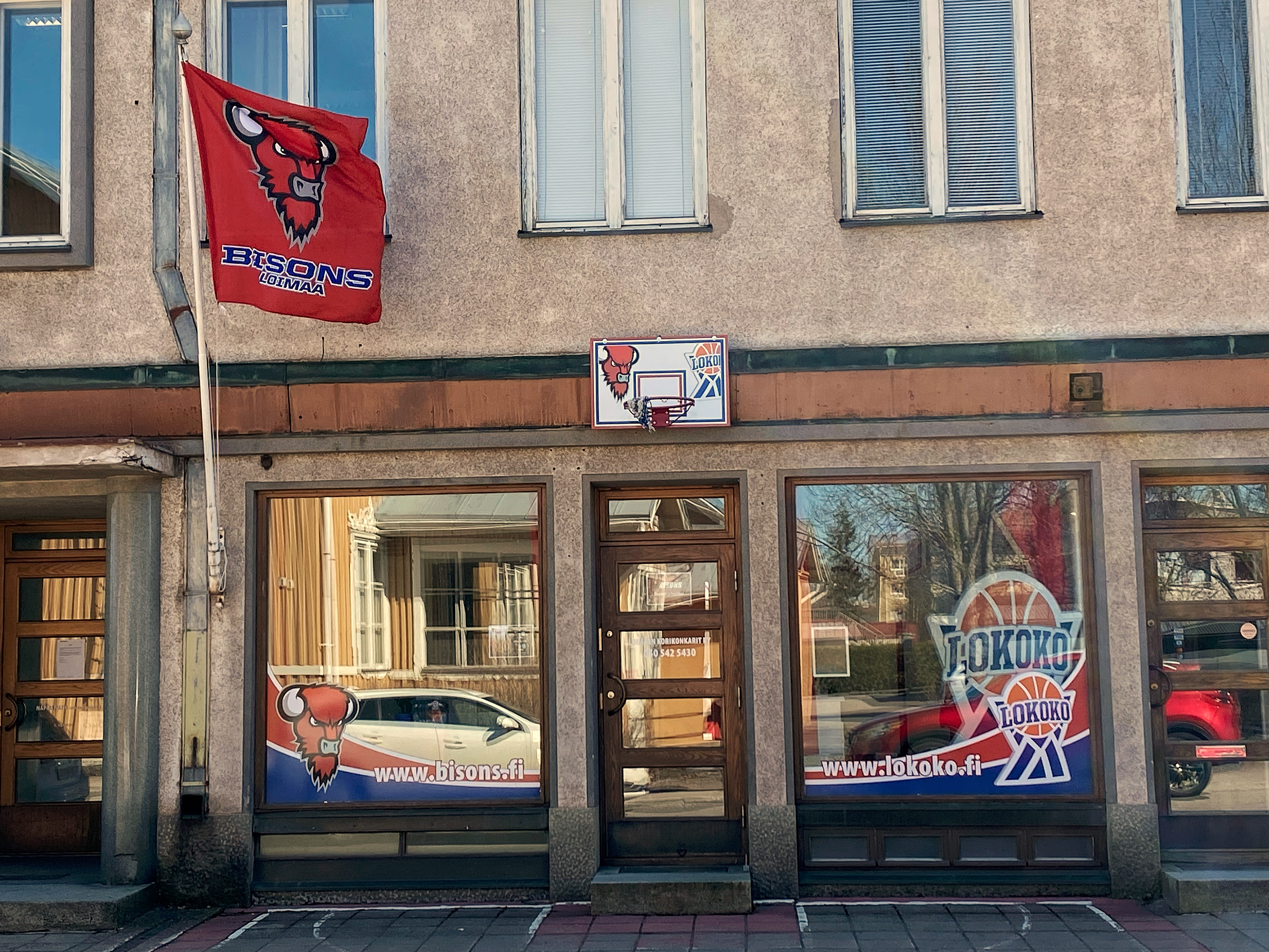
Bison's office and shop

The club was established in 1964 as Loimaan Korikonkarit. The team was renamed Bisons after it was promoted to the Korisliiga in 2011. The team won the Finnish league championship in its first season in the league. Bisons won the championship once again in 2013, and qualified to play in Europe's 2nd-tier competition, the Eurocup, during the Eurocup 2013–14 season.

On 31 May 2016, Bisons Loimaa announced it will not participate in the top Finnish league due to financial problems and would join the second division.

The club plays its national domestic league home games at the Loimaa Sports Center in Loimaa.

== Trophies ==
- Korisliiga
  - Champions (2): 2011–12, 2012–13
    - Runners-up (1): 2014–15

== Current roster ==
Note: Flags indicate national team eligibility at FIBA-sanctioned events. Players may hold other non-FIBA nationalities not displayed.

Bisons Loimaa roster
Players
Coaches

Pos.	No.	Nat.	Name
G	0	(Finland)	Konsta Seppala
F/C	1	(United States)	Kyle Reid (basketball)
G	2	(Finland)	Konsta Hannula
G/F	4	(Finland)	Jani Kivinen
G/F	8	(Finland)	Tero Valkama
C	12	(Finland)	Mika Lahti
F	13	(Finland)	Matti Selinheimo
G	17	(Finland)	Juuso Makila
PG	24	(United States)	Vinay Parmar
F	32	(Finland)	Markus Lamela
F	41	(Slovenia)	Aljosa Bjekovic
F	45	(Finland)	Konsta Ahola

Head coach

(United States) (Finland) Garcia Hopkins

Assistant coach(es)

(Finland) Pekka Julkunen

Legend

- (C) Team captain
- Injured

- Roster
Updated: 6 December 2016

== Notable players ==
Note: Flags indicate national team eligibility at FIBA-sanctioned events. Players may hold other non-FIBA nationalities not displayed.

Criteria

To appear in this section a player must have either:

- Set a club record or won an individual award while at the club
- Played at least one official international match for their national team at any time
- Played at least one official NBA match at any time.

- (Finland) Ilari Seppälä
- (Finland) Mikko Koivisto
- (Finland) Matti Nuutinen
- (Finland) Kimmo Muurinen
- (Finland) Tuukka Kotti
- (Finland) Roope Ahonen
- (The Gambia) Pierre Jallow
- (Netherlands) Yannick Franke
- (New Zealand) Isaac Davidson
- (United States) Ralph Sampson III
- (United States) Martin Zeno

== Season by season ==
Season	Tier	League	Pos.	Finnish Cup	European competitions		Other competitions	
2011–12	1	Korisliiga	1st					
2012–13	1	Korisliiga	1st	Runner–up				
2013–14	1	Korisliiga	3rd		2 Eurocup	RS		
2014–15	1	Korisliiga	2nd				United League	13th
2015–16	1	Korisliiga	5th				United League	13th
