= KTP Basket =

- Leagues: Korisliiga
- Founded: 1927; 99 years ago
- Arena: Steveco-Areena
- Capacity: 1,600
- Location: Kotka, Finland
- Team colors: Green, White
- Head coach: Michael Pounds
- Championships: 6 Finnish Leagues; 9 Finnish Cups
- Website: KTPBasket.fi
Home	Away

Kotkan Työväen Palloilijat Basket, shortly KTP Basket, is the largely independent basketball team of Kotkan Työväen Palloilijat, a Finnish sports club based in Kotka, and has played in the Korisliiga since 1957. The club has won the Finnish championship six times.

== Trophies ==
- Finnish Championships: 6

1958, 1967, 1988, 1991, 1993, 1994
Runner-up: 1960, 1961, 1985, 1986, 1987, 1990, 2013
Bronze: 1957, 1959, 1964, 1966, 1970, 1976, 1982, 1984, 2004, 2011, 2015, 2019

- Finnish Cups: 9

1978, 1983, 1984, 1985, 1987, 1990, 1993, 2003, 2004

== Sponsorship names ==
Due to sponsorship reasons the team has also been known as:

- Team TEHO Sport (2013–14; European competitions)

== Players ==
=== Current roster ===
KTP-Basket roster
Players
Coaches

Pos.	No.	Nat.	Name	Ht.	Wt.	Age
PF	1	(United States)	Pinkston, JayVaughn	2.01 m (6 ft 7 in)	109 kg (240 lb)	34 – 27 November 1991
SF	5	(United States)	Daniels, DeAndre	2.06 m (6 ft 9 in)	95 kg (209 lb)	33 – 15 April 1992
F	7	(Finland)	Skamo, Eldar	1.98 m (6 ft 6 in)	85 kg (187 lb)	39 – 12 October 1986
G	8	(Finland)	Pounds, Michael (C)	1.89 m (6 ft 2 in)	93 kg (205 lb)	37 – 15 September 1988
G	10	(Finland)	Lehtoranta, Janne	1.90 m (6 ft 3 in)	76 kg (168 lb)	25 – 25 August 2000
G	20	(Finland)	Heinonen, Mika	1.91 m (6 ft 3 in)	99 kg (218 lb)	26 – 15 March 1999
F	21	(Finland)	Rautasalo, Markus	1.80 m (5 ft 11 in)	70 kg (154 lb)	25 – 29 June 2000
C	23	(United States)	Langford, Kevin	2.03 m (6 ft 8 in)	98 kg (216 lb)	40 – 21 December 1985
G	25	(Finland)	Hannikainen, Eero	1.90 m (6 ft 3 in)	75 kg (165 lb)	24 – 18 May 2001
SG	32	(Finland)	Kuukkanen, Topias	1.87 m (6 ft 2 in)	83 kg (183 lb)	33 – 6 March 1992
PG	40	(Finland)	Timonen, Joonas	1.89 m (6 ft 2 in)	88 kg (194 lb)	25 – 13 October 2000
F	42	(Finland)	Ailio, Okko	1.97 m (6 ft 6 in)	99 kg (218 lb)	26 – 14 February 2000
F	44	(Finland)	Lehtoranta, Joonas	1.94 m (6 ft 4 in)	75 kg (165 lb)	26 – 25 February 2000
C	45	(Finland)	Uotila, Emil	1.98 m (6 ft 6 in)	99 kg (218 lb)	25 – 28 October 2000
SF		(Finland)	Raitanen, Remu	2.06 m (6 ft 9 in)	90 kg (198 lb)	28 – 21 August 1997

Head coach

- (Finland) Tomi Kaminen

Assistant coach(es)

- (Finland) Sauli Lanki
- (Finland) Harri Laine

Team manager

- (Finland) Heimo Heinonen

Legend

- (C) Team captain
- Injured

- Roster
Updated: 18 September 2019

Note: Flags indicate national team eligibility at FIBA-sanctioned events. Players may hold other non-FIBA nationalities not displayed.

=== Individual awards ===
Korisliiga MVP

- (Finland) Larry Pounds – 1991
- (United States) Jerald Fields – 2007
- (United States) Tim Blue – 2012
- (Finland) Remu Raitanen - 2022

=== Notable players ===
Note: Flags indicate national team eligibility at FIBA-sanctioned events. Players may hold other non-FIBA nationalities not displayed.

Criteria

To appear in this section a player must have either:

- Set a club record or won an individual award while at the club
- Played at least one official international match for their national team at any time
- Played at least one official NBA match at any time.

- (Finland) Mustapha Amzil
- (Finland) Severi Kaukiainen
- (Finland) Jukka Matinen
- (Finland) Remu Raitanen
- (Finland) Samuli Vanttaja
- (Trinidad and Tobago) Ian Young
- (United States) Kenneth Simms
- (United States) LaMonte Ulmer
- (Saint Vincent and the Grenadines) Nyika Williams

== Season by season ==
Season	Tier	League	Pos.	Finnish Cup	European competitions	
2011–12	1	Korisliiga	6th			
2012–13	1	Korisliiga	2nd			
2013–14	1	Korisliiga	4th		3 EuroChallenge	L16
2014–15	1	Korisliiga	3rd		3 EuroChallenge	RS
2015–16	1	Korisliiga	9th		3 FIBA Europe Cup	RS
2016–17	1	Korisliiga	9th			
2017–18	1	Korisliiga	8th			
