= Lappeenrannan NMKY =

Finnish basketball club

- Founded: 1951; 75 years ago
- Arena: Lappeenrannan urheilutalo
- Location: Lappeenranta, Finland
- Team colors: White and red
- President: Jari Vuorenpää
- Website: http://www.lrnmky.fi
Home	Away

The logo of the team as Lappeenrannan NMKY

Lappeenrannan NMKY (also known as LrNMKY for short or as Team Lappeenranta in European competitions) is a basketball club based in a city of Lappeenranta, Finland. It was formed in 1951 as a Young Men's Christian Association (NMKY in Finnish) and has won two Finnish Championships (2005, 2006) and two Finnish Cups (2005, 2006).

Team Lappeenranta participated in Fiba EuroCup challenge in 2005/2006 finishing in semi-finals. In 2007/2008 season team is willing to make another run in Europe, this time in FIBA EuroCup. After the 2013–14 season, NMKY left the Korisliiga because of financial problems.

== Honours ==
- Korisliiga
  - Winners (2): 2005, 2006
- Finnish Cup
  - Winners (4): 2005, 2006, 2007, 2008

== Season by season ==
Season	Tier	League	Pos.	European competitions		
2002–03	1	Korisliiga	8th			
2003–04	1	Korisliiga	5th			
2004–05	1	Korisliiga	1st			
2005–06	1	Korisliiga	1st	4 EuroCup Challenge	SF	6–4
2006–07	1	Korisliiga	6th			
2007–08	1	Korisliiga	3rd	3 FIBA EuroCup	RS	1–5
2008–09	1	Korisliiga	9th			
2009–10	1	Korisliiga	5th			
2010–11	1	Korisliiga	11th			
2011–12	1	Korisliiga	7th			
2012–13	1	Korisliiga	7th			
2013–14	1	Korisliiga	11th (Note: Resigned to its place in the Korisliiga.)			
2014–15	2	1st Division	7th			
2015–16	2	1st Division	4th			
2016–17	2	1st Division	13th			
