= Kouvot =

- Leagues: Korisliiga
- Founded: 1964; 62 years ago
- Arena: MLL Areena
- Capacity: 1,076
- Location: Kouvola, Finland
- Team colors: Black, Red, White
- Head coach: Jyri Lehtonen
- Korisliiga titles: 4 (1995, 1999, 2004, 2016)
- Finnish Cup titles: 1 (1998)
- Website: kouvot.fi
Home	Away

Kouvot is a Finnish professional basketball team based in Kouvola. Founded in 1964, the team plays in the Korisliiga and has won the national championship four times: in 1995, 1999, 2004, and 2016. The team plays at the Mansikka-ahon urheiluhalli.

== Trophies ==
- Korisliiga

Champions (4): 1994–95, 1998–99, 2003–04, 2015–16
Runner-up (4): 1996–97, 1997–98, 2007–08, 2018–19
Bronze (1): 2009–10

- Finnish Cup

Winners (1): 1997–98
Runner-up (4): 1996-97, 2000-01, 2002-03, 2006-07

- First Division

Winners(1): 1992–93

== Logos ==
Logo used last in the 2014–15 season, when the logo was modernized to the current logo

== Players ==
=== Current roster ===
Note: Flags indicate national team eligibility at FIBA-sanctioned events. Players may hold other non-FIBA nationalities not displayed.

Kouvot Kouvola roster
Players
Coaches

Pos.	No.	Nat.	Name	Ht.	Wt.	Age
F	2	(Finland)	Latimer, Cedric	1.98 m (6 ft 6 in)
G/F	3	(Finland)	Saarijarvi, Arttu	2.00 m (6 ft 7 in)
PG	4	(Finland)	Hirvonen, Tuomas	1.80 m (5 ft 11 in)
G	6	(United States)	Shiloh, Kyle	1.90 m (6 ft 3 in)
G	7	(Finland)	Seppala, Ilari	1.88 m (6 ft 2 in)
G	10	(United States)	Gonzalvez, David	1.93 m (6 ft 4 in)		38 – 29 October 1987
SG	11	(United States)	Richardson, D.J.	1.90 m (6 ft 3 in)	88 kg (194 lb)	35 – 11 February 1991
PF	12	(Finland)	Luosmaa, Miikka	2.04 m (6 ft 8 in)
F	14	(Finland)	Laine, Oskari	1.91 m (6 ft 3 in)
G	15	(Finland)	Kukkonen, Arttu	1.83 m (6 ft 0 in)
G	21	(Finland)	Knihtinen, Teemu	1.92 m (6 ft 4 in)
G	23	(Finland)	Leino, Vatteri	1.81 m (5 ft 11 in)
C	24	(Finland)	Masden, Alexander	2.05 m (6 ft 9 in)
G/F	34	(United States)	Story, Malik	1.96 m (6 ft 5 in)
F	42	(United States)	Gipson, Thomas	2.01 m (6 ft 7 in)
SG		(Finland)	Alanen, Aapeli	2.01 m (6 ft 7 in)
SG		(Norway)	Rotegård, Tobias	2.01 m (6 ft 7 in)

Head coach

- (Finland) Pieti Poikola

Assistant coach(es)

- (Finland) Antti Hurri

Legend

- (C) Team captain
- Injured

=== Notable players ===
Note: Flags indicate national team eligibility at FIBA-sanctioned events. Players may hold other non-FIBA nationalities not displayed.

Criteria

To appear in this section a player must have either:

- Set a club record or won an individual award while at the club
- Played at least one official international match for their national team at any time
- Played at least one official NBA match at any time.

- (Finland) Tuomas Iisalo
- (Finland) Antti Kanervo
- (Finland) Henri Kantonen
- (Finland) Alexander Madsen
- (Finland) Ilari Seppälä
- (Finland) Jukka Toijala
- (United Kingdom) Devon van Oostrum
- (United States) D.J. Richardson
- (United States) Eli Scott
- (United States) Jason Conley
- (United States) Deshon Taylor
- (United States) (Panama) Ricky Lindo
