= Kataja BC =

Kataja
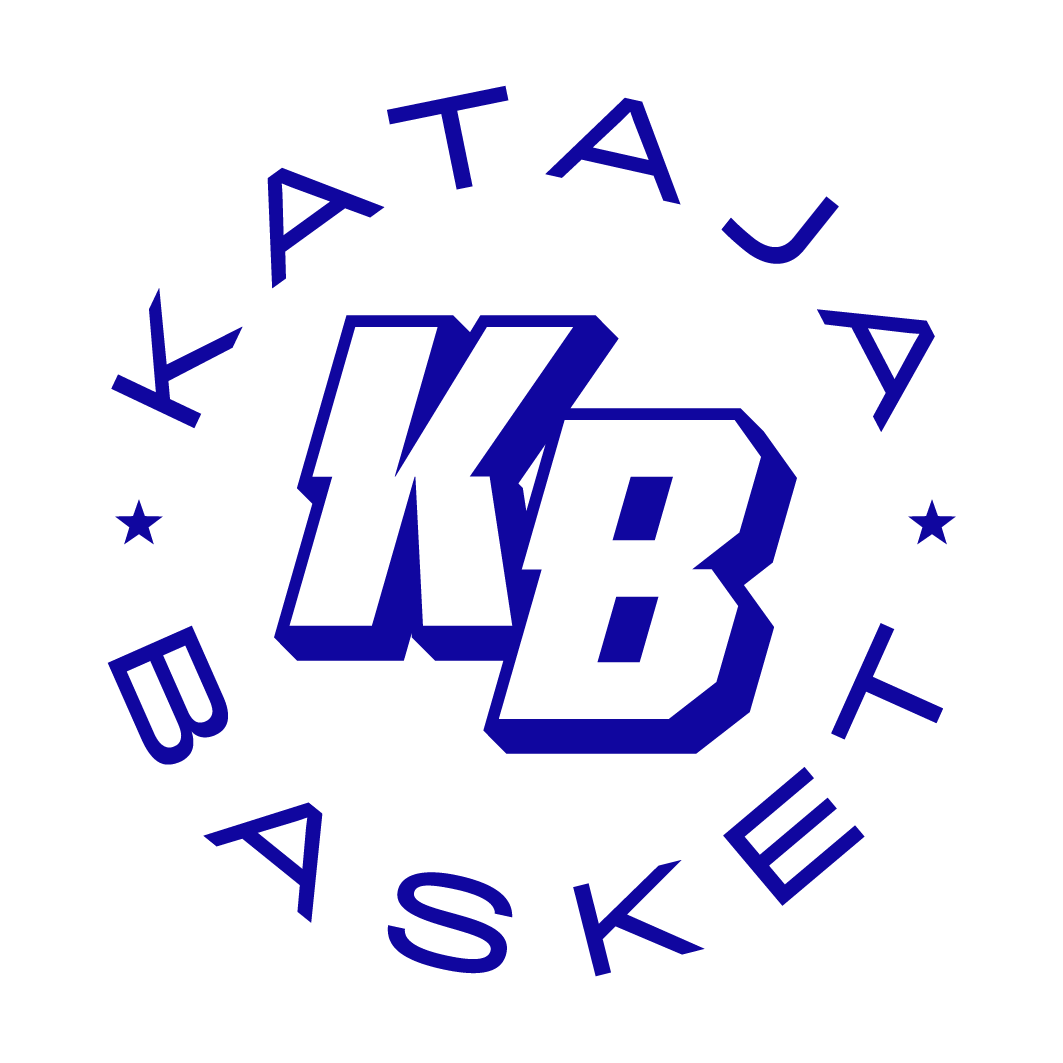
- Leagues: Korisliiga
- Founded: 1949; 77 years ago
- Arena: Motonet Areena
- Capacity: 2,500
- Location: Joensuu, Finland
- Head coach: Petri Virtanen
- Championships: 2 Finnish Leagues; 4 Finnish Cups
- Retired numbers: 4 (9)(11) (14) (15)
- Website: katajabasket.fi
Home	Away

Kataja Basket Club (eng. Juniper) is a professional basketball club of sports club Kataja from Joensuu, Finland. The team plays in the Korisliiga, the highest tier of Finnish basketball. In 2015, Kataja won its first national championship, after it beat Bisons Loimaa 3–2 in the Finnish Finals.

== History ==
The basketball activity of the club started in 1955. In 1961, the team started playing in the Joensuu Sports Hall. The team started in provincial competitions, but quickly promoted to the national level in the 1960s. From 1976 till 1980, the team played continuously in the highest Finnish division. In the 2001–02 season, the team won its first trophy when it won the Finnish Cup. In 2015, the first championship of Kataja was realized after a 3–2 Finals series win against Bisons Loimaa. In the 2012–13 season, Kataja started participating in European competitions when it entered the EuroChallenge. The team immediately reached the quarterfinals of the competition, and has played in Europe every season since.

== Achievements ==
- Korisliiga

Champions (2): 2014–15, 2016–17

- Finnish Cup

Champions (4): 2002, 2011, 2012, 2023

== Players ==
=== Retired numbers ===
Kataja Basket Club retired numbers
No.	Nat.	Player	Position	Tenure
9	(United States)	Leon Huff	C	1975–1978, 1979-1980, 1993-1994
11	(Finland)	Eero Oksava	G	1963–1980
14	(Finland)	Petri Virtanen	G	2005–2007, 2008-2016
15	(Finland)	Sami Lehtoranta	C	2005–2014

=== Current roster ===
Kataja Basket roster
Players
Coaches

Pos.	No.	Nat.	Name	Ht.	Wt.	Age
SG	1	(Finland)	Rönnholm, Thomas	1.97 m (6 ft 6 in)	84 kg (185 lb)	23 – 4 October 2003
PG	2	(United States)	Strong, Stevie	1.85 m (6 ft 1 in)	84 kg (185 lb)	23 – 3 July 2003
PF	3	(United States)	Springs, Richie	2.06 m (6 ft 9 in)	107 kg (236 lb)	25 – 28 September 2001
SG	4	(United States)	Lake, Jalen	1.93 m (6 ft 4 in)	93 kg (205 lb)	24 – 26 April 2002
PG	5	(Finland)	Timonen, Joonas	1.89 m (6 ft 2 in)	88 kg (194 lb)	26 – 13 October 2000
PF	7	(United States)	Harris, Josiah	2.06 m (6 ft 9 in)	102 kg (225 lb)	24 – 7 June 2002
PG	10	(Finland)	Suokas, Teemu	1.88 m (6 ft 2 in)	84 kg (185 lb)	25 – 27 March 2001
C	13	(Finland)	Aropelto, Aatu	2.07 m (6 ft 9 in)	104 kg (229 lb)	18 – 24 October 2008
SF	17	(Finland)	Pokela, Valtteri	1.98 m (6 ft 6 in)	90 kg (198 lb)	18 – 16 August 2008
PF	21	(Finland)	Knihtinen, Teemu	1.94 m (6 ft 4 in)	89 kg (196 lb)	27 – 10 December 1998
SG	31	(Finland)	Palmi, Topias (C)	1.96 m (6 ft 5 in)	91 kg (201 lb)	32 – 26 August 1994
SF	33	(Finland)	Besselink, Max	2.02 m (6 ft 8 in)	98 kg (216 lb)	24 – 4 April 2002
SF	45	(Finland)	Permanto, Henri	1.97 m (6 ft 6 in)	88 kg (194 lb)	25 – 5 March 2001

Head coach

(Finland) Petri Virtanen

Assistant coach(es)

(Finland) Valtteri Pihlajamäki

Legend

- (C) Team captain
- Injured

- Roster
Updated: October 11, 2026

=== Notable players ===
- Set a club record or won an individual award as a professional player.
- Played at least one official international match for his senior national team at any time.

- (Finland) Fiifi Aidoo
- (Finland) Antti Kanervo
- (Finland) Pekka Markkanen
- (Finland) Topias Palmi
- (Finland) Ilari Seppälä
- (Finland) Jukka Toijala
- (Finland) Petri Virtanen
- (Finland) Teemu Rannikko
- (Canada) Daniel Mullings
- (Nigeria) Amanze Egekeze
- (United States) Robert Arnold
- (United States) Rion Brown
- (United States) (Uganda) Nike Sibande

== Season by season ==
Season	Tier	League	Pos.	Finnish Cup (Note: The Finnish Cup competition was inactive from 2014–2018.)	European competitions		
2010–11	1	Korisliiga	2nd	Champion			
2011–12	1	Korisliiga	2nd	Champion			
2012–13	1	Korisliiga	3rd		3 EuroChallenge	QF	6–8
2013–14	1	Korisliiga	2nd	—N/a	3 EuroChallenge	RS	2–4
2014–15	1	Korisliiga	1st	—N/a	3 EuroChallenge	RS	0–6
2015–16	1	Korisliiga	5th	—N/a	3 FIBA Europe Cup	R32	5–7
2016–17	1	Korisliiga	1st	—N/a	3 Champions League	RS	6–8
2016–17	1	Korisliiga	1st	—N/a	4 FIBA Europe Cup	R16	0–2
2017–18	1	Korisliiga	6th	—N/a	3 Champions League	QR3	1–1–2
2017–18	1	Korisliiga	6th	—N/a	4 FIBA Europe Cup	R2	4–8
2018–19	1	Korisliiga	5th		4 FIBA Europe Cup	R2	8–8
2019–20	1	Korisliiga	7th (Note: On 13 March 2020, the season was ended prematurely due to the coronavirus pandemic.)		4 FIBA Europe Cup	RS	3–5
2020–21	1	Korisliiga	7th				
2021–22	1	Korisliiga	4th				
2022–23	1	Korisliiga	3rd	Champion			
2023–24	1	Korisliiga	4th		4 FIBA Europe Cup	RS	2–6
2024–25	1	Korisliiga	4th				
2025-26	1	Korisliiga	2nd				
