= Namika Lahti =

- Leagues: Korisliiga
- Founded: 1898
- Dissolved: 2015
- History: Viipuri (Vyborg) NMKY (1898–1948); Namika Lahti (Lahden NMKY) (1948–2015)
- Arena: Suurhalli Areena
- Capacity: 2,000
- Location: Lahti, Finland
- Team colors: Purple and White
- Championships: 2 Finnish Titles; 3 Finnish Cups
- Retired numbers: 1 (6)
- Website: namikalahti.com
| Home | Away |

Namika Lahti was a basketball club based in Lahti, Finland. The club played in the Korisliiga, the top Finnish championship league. The club was established in 1898 in Vyborg and moved to Lahti in 1947. In 2015, the club was dissolved, after economic problems.

== Name and history ==
"Namika" is a nickname for NMKY, meaning YMCA. The association was founded in 1898 in Vyborg, and moved to Lahti after the World War II as Vyborg became a part of Soviet Union.

== Titles ==
- Korisliiga (2):

2000, 2009
Runners-up (4): 1996, 2002, 2004, 2007
Third place: 2001

- Finnish Cup (3):

1989, 1994, 2000

== Season by season ==
Recent seasons
| Season | Tier | League | Pos. | Postseason | European competitions |
|---|---|---|---|---|---|
| 2010–11 | 1 | Korisliiga | 9 | – | – |
| 2011–12 | 1 | Korisliiga | 11 | – | – |
| 2012–13 | 1 | Korisliiga | 11 | – | – |
| 2013–14 | 1 | Korisliiga | 8 | Quarterfinalist | – |

== Notable players ==
- (United States) Ricky Hickman (1 season: 2009–10)
- (United States) Robert Arnold (1 season: 2013–14)
- (Finland) Aapeli Alanen
- (Finland) Timo Lampen (8 seasons: 1959-67, retired jersey #6)
- (Finland) Hannes Pöllä
