= Juhani Keto =

Finnish basketball player (1947–2018)

Personal information
- Born: 20 September 1947 Helsinki, Finland
- Died: 26 August 2018 (aged 70) Helsinki, Finland
- Listed height: 6 ft 5 in (1.96 m)
- Position: Power forward, center

Career history
- 1968–1972: Tapion Honka
- 1972–1974: Turun NMKY
- 1974–1975: Torpan Pojat
- 1976–1978: Torpan Pojat

Career highlights
- 6× Finnish League champion (1969–1973, 1978); 3× Finnish Cup winner (1968, 1971, 1972)

Juhani Keto (20 September 1947 – 26 August 2018) was a Finnish basketball player.

Keto was a six-time Finnish champion and three-time Finnish Cup winner. Representing Tapion Honka, Turun NMKY and Torpan Pojat, he also achieved two SM-sarja bronze medals.

Keto had 74 caps for the Finnish national team with whom he won Nordic championship in 1968 and took part in 1972 Olympic Trials.

Keto died at the age of 70 on 16 August 2018. His daughter was one time married to world record swimmer Jani Sievinen.

== Trophies and awards ==
- SM-sarja championship in 1969, 1970, 1971, 1972, 1973, and 1978
  - bronze in 1974 and 1977
- Finnish cup championship in 1968, 1971, and 1972
- Nordic championship with national team in 1968

== Sources ==
- "Juhani Keto". Finnish Basketball Association.
- "National Team Statistics". Finnish Basketball Association.
