= Gordon Herbert =

Finnish basketball coach (born 1959)

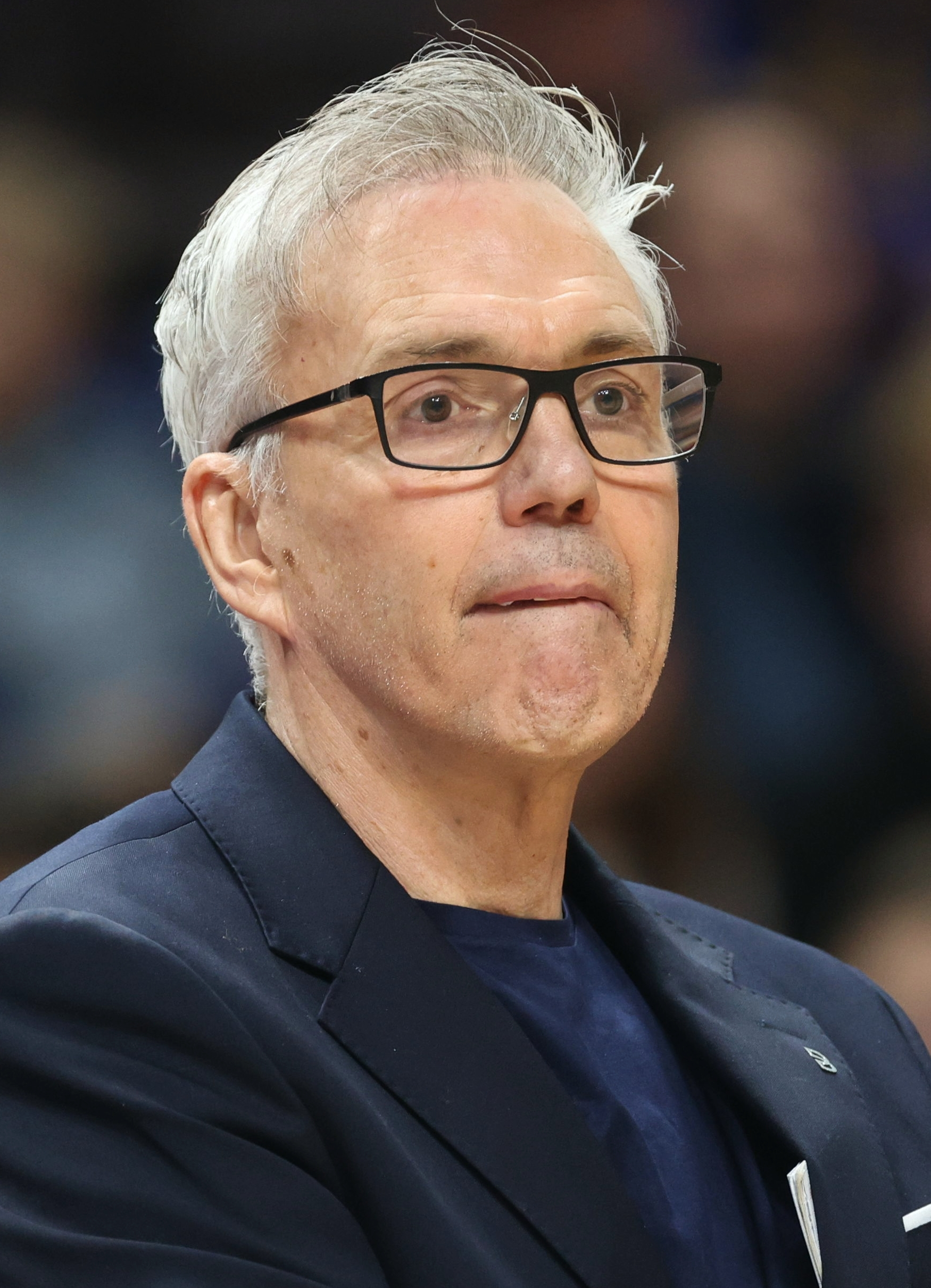
- Herbert in 2025

New Zealand Breakers
- Title: Head coach
- League: NBL

Personal information
- Born: February 16, 1959 (age 67) Penticton, British Columbia, Canada
- Listed height: 6 ft 6 in (1.98 m)

Career information
- High school: Penticton Secondary School Lakers
- College: North Idaho (1977–1979); Idaho (1979–1982)
- NBA draft: 1982: undrafted
- Playing career: 1982–1994
- Position: Small forward
- Coaching career: 1994–present

Career history

Playing
- 1982–1983: Hyvinkään Tahko
- 1983–1984: BBC Toptours Aarschot
- 1984–1985: Hyvinkään Tahko
- 1985-1988: Turun NMKY
- 1988–1989: Forssan Koripojat
- 1989–1991: NMKY Helsinki
- 1991–1994: Korihait

Coaching
- 1994–1996: Korihait
- 1996–1999: Espoon Honka
- 1999–2000: Oberwart Gunners
- 2000–2001: s.Oliver Würzburg
- 2001–2004: Skyliners Frankfurt
- 2004–2006: Paris Basket Racing
- 2006–2007: Élan Béarnais Pau-Orthez
- 2007–2008: Aris
- 2008–2009: Toronto Raptors (assistant)
- 2009–2010: Espoon Honka
- 2010–2011: Skyliners Frankfurt
- 2011–2012: Alba Berlin
- 2013–2020: Skyliners Frankfurt
- 2020–2021: Avtodor
- 2024–2025: Bayern Munich
- 2026–present: New Zealand Breakers

Career highlights
- As head coach: FIBA Europe Cup champion (2016); 2× Bundesliga champion (2004, 2025); Bundesliga Coach of the Year (2016); French Cup winner (2007); Finnish Cup winner (2009); Austrian League Coach of the Year (2000); Finnish Coach of the Year (2023); All-German Sport's Coach of the Year (2023); As player: Second-team All-Big Sky (1982)
Medals
Men's basketball
Representing Canada
Universiade
Gold medal – first place	1983 Edmonton
Men's basketball
Head Coach for Germany
FIBA World Cup
Gold medal – first place	2023 Philippines–Japan–Indonesia
EuroBasket
Bronze medal – third place	2022 Czech Republic–Georgia–Italy–Germany

Gordon Walter Herbert (born February 16, 1959) is a Canadian and Finnish professional basketball coach and former player currently serving as the head coach of the New Zealand Breakers of the Australian National Basketball League (NBL). He also serves as head of the Canada national team. He previously served as head coach of the German national team, where he guided them to a bronze medal at the EuroBasket 2022 and a gold medal at the 2023 FIBA World Cup.

== Playing career ==
Born and raised in Penticton, British Columbia, Herbert attended two-year North Idaho College in Coeur d'Alene, and transferred to the University of Idaho in Moscow in 1979, where he played college basketball for the Vandals under head coach Don Monson. Prior to his senior season in 1980–81, he injured his left wrist and was redshirted; the Vandals were 25–4 and went to the NCAA tournament as Big Sky champions.

As a fifth-year senior in 1981–82, Herbert started at forward and Idaho won its first sixteen games, went 24–2 in the regular season, and were sixth in the AP and UPI polls. They advanced to the Sweet Sixteen, and finished with the best record in school history at 27–3. While undefeated at 15–0, an article on the team appeared in Sports Illustrated. Twice during the regular season, Herbert was the Big Sky player of the week, and was second team all-conference.

After college, he moved to Hyvinkää, Finland, in 1982, and joined Hyvinkään Tahko. He also represented Turun NMKY, Forssan Koripojat, Helsingin NMKY and Korihait. In total, Herbert played professionally in Finland for 12 years with various teams. His club playing career ended in 1994, when he started coaching.

== International career ==
Herbert also played with the senior Canadian national team at the 1984 Summer Olympics, where they finished just out of medal position in fourth place. He also played with Canada at the 1986 FIBA World Championship.

== Coaching career ==
After ending his professional playing career in Finland, Herbert stayed in the country and started his coaching career in 1994 with Finnish Korisliiga team Korihait in Uusikaupunki, before moving to Espoon Honka in 1996.

Herbert has coached many teams, including Frankfurt Skyliners, with which he won the German League title in 2004. He led the Skyliners to their 3rd German League finals appearance, against the league's first place Brose Bamberg, after beating other top-rated German teams, such as Alba Berlin, in the playoffs. He also coached French teams Paris and Pau Orthez, with which he won the French Cup in the 2006–07 season.

On July 7, 2007, he became the head coach of the Greek club Aris.

In 2008–09, Herbert served as an assistant coach of the Toronto Raptors in National Basketball Association (NBA).

In the 2015–16 season, Herbert won the FIBA Europe Cup with the Skyliners, after his team defeated Pallacanestro Varese in the Final. Herbert was also named the German Basketball Bundesliga Coach of the Year that season. Herbert's contract with the Skyliners ended in May 2020.

On July 2, 2020, he signed with Avtodor of the VTB United League. He was sacked in March 2021.

In September 2021, he was named head coach of the Germany national team. He guided the German team to a bronze medal at the 2022 European Championships and to the gold medal in the 2023 World Cup. On 17 December 2023, Herbert was named the Coach of the Year in Germany. On 11 January 2024, Herbert was named the Coach of the Year also in Finland, by the Finnish sports journalists. On 16 May 2024, it was reported that Herbert will leave the Germany national team after the 2024 Summer Olympics in Paris.

On 25 July 2024, it was announced that Herbert would start as the head coach of Bayern Munich in the Basketball Bundesliga and the EuroLeague after the 2024 Summer Olympics.

On 1 May 2025, Herbert was appointed by Canada Basketball as the head coach of its men's national team ahead of the 2025 FIBA AmeriCup and for the window of the 2027 FIBA World Cup and 2028 Summer Olympics.

On 20 May 2026, Herbert was appointed head coach of the New Zealand Breakers of the Australian National Basketball League (NBL) on a two-year deal.

== Coaching titles ==
- Germany (2021–2024):
  - FIBA World Cup: 2023
- Skyliners Frankfurt (2001–04, 2010–11, 2013–2020):
  - Basketball Bundesliga: 2003–04
  - FIBA Europe Cup: 2015–16
- Élan Béarnais Pau-Orthez (2006–07):
  - French Cup: 2006–07
- Espoon Honka (1996–99, 2009–10):
  - Finnish Cup: 2009

== Personal life ==
Born in Canada, Herbert acquired Finnish citizenship via naturalization in the late 1980s. He is a fluent Finnish speaker. His son Daniel Herbert is also a basketball coach.

== See also ==
- List of foreign NBA coaches
