= R.C. Mechelen in international competitions =

R.C. Mechelen history and statistics in FIBA Europe and Euroleague Basketball (company) competitions.

== 1960s ==
=== 1965–66 FIBA European Champions Cup, 1st–tier ===
The 1965–66 FIBA European Champions Cup was the 9th installment of the European top-tier level professional basketball club competition FIBA European Champions Cup (now called EuroLeague), running from November 3, 1965 to April 1, 1966. The trophy was won by Simmenthal Milano, who defeated Slavia VŠ Praha by a result of 77–72 at Palazzo dello sport in Bologna, Italy. Overall, Racing Mechelen achieved in present competition a record of 7 wins against 3 defeats, in three successive rounds. More detailed:

==== First round ====
- Tie played on November 12, 1965 and on November 16, 1965.

Team 1	Agg.	Team 2	1st leg	2nd leg
Aldershot Warriors (England)	144–213	(Belgium) Racing Mechelen	83–113	61–100

==== Second round ====
- Tie played on December 9, 1965 and on December 16, 1965.

Team 1	Agg.	Team 2	1st leg	2nd leg
Racing Mechelen (Belgium)	210–150	(Finland) Helsingin Kisa-Toverit	116–79	99–74

==== Quarterfinals ====
- Day 1 (January 12, 1966) / Day 2 (January 21, 1966)

Team 1	Agg.	Team 2	1st leg	2nd leg
Racing Mechelen (Belgium)	170–189	(Italy) Simmenthal Milano	104–94	66–95

- Day 3 (February 10, 1966) / Day 4 (February 18, 1966)

Team 1	Agg.	Team 2	1st leg	2nd leg
Racing Mechelen (Belgium)	203–196	(Spain) Real Madrid	104–95	99–101

- Day 5 (March 9, 1966) / Day 6 (March 17, 1966)

Team 1	Agg.	Team 2	1st leg	2nd leg
Racing Mechelen (Belgium)	180–185	(Czechoslovakia) Slavia VŠ Praha	104–91	76–94

- Group A standings:

	Team	Pld	Pts	W	L	PF	PA	PD
1.	(Czechoslovakia) Slavia VŠ Praha	3	5	2	1	490	486	+4
2.	(Italy) Simmenthal Milano	3	5	2	1	503	476	+27
3.	(Belgium) Racing Mechelen	3	4	1	2	553	570	-17
4.	(Spain) Real Madrid	3	4	1	2	494	508	-14

=== 1966–67 FIBA European Champions Cup, 1st–tier ===
The 1966–67 FIBA European Champions Cup was the 10th installment of the European top-tier level professional basketball club competition FIBA European Champions Cup (now called EuroLeague), running from November 6, 1966 to April 1, 1967. The trophy was won by Real Madrid, who defeated the title holder Simmenthal Milano by a result of 91–83 at their home venue Pabellón de la Ciudad Deportiva, in Madrid, Spain. Overall, Racing Mechelen achieved in present competition a record of 4 wins against 4 defeats, in two successive rounds. More detailed:

==== Second round ====
- Tie played on December 8, 1966 and on December 15, 1966.

Team 1	Agg.	Team 2	1st leg	2nd leg
Budapesti Honvéd (Hungary)	150–167	(Belgium) Racing Mechelen	80–76	70–91

==== Quarterfinals ====
- Day 1 (January 11, 1967) / Day 2 (January 18, 1967)

Team 1	Agg.	Team 2	1st leg	2nd leg
Racing Mechelen (Belgium)	214–224	(Italy) Simmenthal Milano	110–103	104–121

- Day 3 (February 2, 1967) / Day 4 (February 8, 1967)

Team 1	Agg.	Team 2	1st leg	2nd leg
Racing Mechelen (Belgium)	163–126	(France) ASVEL	92–63	71–63

- Day 5 (February 23, 1967) / Day 6 (March 2, 1967)

Team 1	Agg.	Team 2	1st leg	2nd leg
Racing Mechelen (Belgium)	150–177	(Socialist Federal Republic of Yugoslavia) AŠK Olimpija	70–76	80–101

- Group B standings:

	Team	Pld	Pts	W	L	PF	PA	PD
1.	(Italy) Simmenthal Milano	3	6	3	0	593	526	+67
2.	(Socialist Federal Republic of Yugoslavia) AŠK Olimpija	3	4	1	2	487	480	+7
3.	(Belgium) Racing Mechelen	3	4	1	2	527	527	0
4.	(France) ASVEL	3	4	1	2	427	498	-71

=== 1967–68 FIBA European Champions Cup, 1st–tier ===
The 1967–68 FIBA European Champions Cup was the 11th installment of the European top-tier level professional basketball club competition FIBA European Champions Cup (now called EuroLeague), running from November 9, 1967 to April 11, 1968. The trophy was won by the title holder Real Madrid, who defeated Spartak ZJŠ Brno by a result of 98–95 at Palais des Sports in Lyon, France. Overall, Racing Bell Mechelen achieved in present competition a record of 4 wins against 4 defeats, in two successive rounds. More detailed:

==== Second round ====
- Tie played on December 10, 1967 and on December 14, 1967.

Team 1	Agg.	Team 2	1st leg	2nd leg
Benfica de Luanda (Portugal)	133–261	(Belgium) Racing Bell Mechelen	59–90	74–171

==== Quarterfinals ====
- Day 1 (January 25, 1968) / Day 2 (February 1, 1968)

Team 1	Agg.	Team 2	1st leg	2nd leg
Maccabi Tel Aviv (Israel)	80–62	(Belgium) Racing Bell Mechelen	78–62	02–00*

^{*}Racing Bell Mechelen was punished with a forfeit (2–0) in this game after they scored an own basket to tie the game 74–74, trying to go into a five minutes extra-time that could allow the Belgian team to overcome the -16 points difference from the first leg. However Maccabi Tel Aviv scored one more point before the end and the final score was 74–75 for the Israeli team. In any case, FIBA decided to cancel this game and declared Maccabi winner by forfeit.

- Day 3 (February 14, 1968) / Day 4 (February 22, 1968)

Team 1	Agg.	Team 2	1st leg	2nd leg
Spartak ZJŠ Brno (Czechoslovakia)	155–147	(Belgium) Racing Bell Mechelen	76–67	79–80

- Day 3 (March 7, 1968) / Day 4 (March 14, 1968)

Team 1	Agg.	Team 2	1st leg	2nd leg
Racing Bell Mechelen (Belgium)	141–167	(Spain) Real Madrid	76–69	65–98

- Group B standings:

	Team	Pld	Pts	W	L	PF	PA	PD
1.	(Czechoslovakia) Spartak ZJŠ Brno	3	6	3	0	539	482	+57
2.	(Spain) Real Madrid	3	5	2	1	501	482	+19
3.	(Israel) Maccabi Tel Aviv	3	4	1	2	381	407	-26
4.	(Belgium) Racing Bell Mechelen	3	3	0	3	350	400	-50

== 1970s ==
=== 1969–70 FIBA European Champions Cup, 1st–tier ===
The 1969–70 FIBA European Champions Cup was the 13th installment of the European top-tier level professional basketball club competition FIBA European Champions Cup (now called EuroLeague), running from November 6, 1969 to April 4, 1970. The trophy was won by Ignis Varese, who defeated the title holder CSKA Moscow, by a result of 79–74 at Sportska Dvorana Skenderija in Sarajevo, SFR Yugoslavia. Overall, Racing Bell Mechelen achieved in present competition a record of 8 wins against 2 defeats, in three successive rounds. More detailed:

==== First round ====
- Tie played on November 6, 1969 and on November 13, 1969.

Team 1	Agg.	Team 2	1st leg	2nd leg
Boroughmir (Scotland)	204–267	(Belgium) Racing Bell Mechelen	84–123	120–144

==== Second round ====
- Tie played on December 4, 1969 and on December 11, 1969.

Team 1	Agg.	Team 2	1st leg	2nd leg
Dinamo București (Romania)	146–182	(Belgium) Racing Bell Mechelen	73–95	73–87

==== Quarterfinals ====
- Day 1 (January 15, 1970) / Day 2 (January 22, 1970)

Team 1	Agg.	Team 2	1st leg	2nd leg
Academic (Bulgaria)	128–141	(Belgium) Racing Bell Mechelen	55–61	73–80

- Day 3 (February 5, 1970) / Day 4 (February 12, 1970)

Team 1	Agg.	Team 2	1st leg	2nd leg
Real Madrid (Spain)	162–159	(Belgium) Racing Bell Mechelen	80–70	82–89

- Day 5 (February 19, 1970) / Day 6 (February 25, 1970)

Team 1	Agg.	Team 2	1st leg	2nd leg
Racing Bell Mechelen (Belgium)	146–150	(Czechoslovakia) Slavia VŠ Praha	78–70	68–80

- Group A standings:

	Team	Pld	Pts	W	L	PF	PA	PD
1.	(Spain) Real Madrid	3	5	2	1	516	501	+15
2.	(Czechoslovakia) Slavia VŠ Praha	3	5	2	1	457	457	0
3.	(Belgium) Racing Bell Mechelen	3	4	1	2	446	440	+6
4.	(Bulgaria) Academic	3	4	1	2	452	473	-21

=== 1970–71 FIBA European Cup Winners' Cup, 2nd–tier ===
The 1970–71 FIBA European Cup Winners' Cup was the 5th installment of FIBA's 2nd-tier level European-wide professional club basketball competition FIBA European Cup Winners' Cup (lately called FIBA Saporta Cup), running from December 3, 1970 to April 7, 1971. The trophy was won by Simmenthal Milano, who defeated Spartak Leningrad in a two-legged final on a home and away basis. Overall, Racing Bell Mechelen achieved in present competition a record of 2 wins against 2 defeats, in two successive rounds. More detailed:

==== First round ====
- Tie played on December 3, 1970 and on December 10, 1970.

Team 1	Agg.	Team 2	1st leg	2nd leg
Arantia Larochette (Luxembourg)	133–214	(Belgium) Racing Bell Mechelen	85–106	48–108

==== Second round ====
- Tie played on January 6, 1971 and on January 14, 1971.

Team 1	Agg.	Team 2	1st leg	2nd leg
Simmenthal Milano (Italy)	171–145	(Belgium) Racing Bell Mechelen	96–74	75–71

=== 1971–72 FIBA European Cup Winners' Cup, 2nd–tier ===
The 1971–72 FIBA European Cup Winners' Cup was the 6th installment of FIBA's 2nd-tier level European-wide professional club basketball competition FIBA European Cup Winners' Cup (lately called FIBA Saporta Cup), running from November 4, 1971 to March 21, 1972. The trophy was won by the title holder Simmenthal Milano, who defeated Crvena zvezda by a result of 74–70 at Alexandreio Melathron in Thessaloniki, Greece. Overall, Racing Bell Mechelen achieved in present competition a record of 5 wins against 3 defeats, in three successive rounds. More detailed:

==== First round ====
- Tie played on November 4, 1971 and on November 11, 1971.

Team 1	Agg.	Team 2	1st leg	2nd leg
Racing Bell Mechelen (Belgium)	190–144	(Portugal) Associação Académica de Coimbra	113–71	77–73

==== Second round ====
- Tie played on December 2, 1971 and on December 9, 1971.

Team 1	Agg.	Team 2	1st leg	2nd leg
Denain Voltaire (France)	146–158	(Belgium) Racing Bell Mechelen	74–68	72–90

==== Quarterfinals ====
- Day 1 (January 6, 1972) / Day 2 (January 13, 1972)

Team 1	Agg.	Team 2	1st leg	2nd leg
Fides Napoli (Italy)	174–172	(Belgium) Racing Bell Mechelen	97–82	77–90

- Day 3 (February 10, 1972) / Day 4 (February 15, 1972)

Team 1	Agg.	Team 2	1st leg	2nd leg
Racing Bell Mechelen (Belgium)	153–154	(Spain) Juventud Schweppes	96–77	57–77

- Group A standings:

	Team	Pld	Pts	W	L	PF	PA	PD
1.	(Italy) Fides Napoli	2	4	2	0	335	321	+14
2.	(Spain) Juventud Schweppes	2	3	1	1	303	314	-11
3.	(Belgium) Racing Bell Mechelen	2	2	0	2	325	328	-3

=== 1973 FIBA Korać Cup, 3rd–tier ===
The 1973 FIBA Korać Cup was the 2nd installment of the European 3rd-tier level professional basketball club competition FIBA Korać Cup, running from January 9, 1973 to March 27, 1973. The trophy was won by Birra Forst Cantù, who defeated Maes Pils in a two-legged final on a home and away basis. Overall, Maes Pils achieved in present competition a record of 5 wins against 3 defeats, in three successive rounds. More detailed:

==== Top 12 ====
- Day 1 (January 10, 1973) / Day 2 (January 17, 1973)

Team 1	Agg.	Team 2	1st leg	2nd leg
YMCA Thessaloniki (Greece)	144–172	(Belgium) Maes Pils	73–76	71–96

- Day 5 (February 7, 1973) / Day 6 (February 14, 1973)

Team 1	Agg.	Team 2	1st leg	2nd leg
Maes Pils (Belgium)	197–179	(Socialist Federal Republic of Yugoslavia) Lokomotiva	115–92	82–87

- Group A standings:

	Team	Pld	Pts	W	L	PF	PA	PD
1.	(Belgium) Maes Pils	2	4	2	0	369	323	+46
2.	(Socialist Federal Republic of Yugoslavia) Lokomotiva	2	3	1	1	333	326	+7
3.	(Greece) YMCA Thessaloniki	2	2	0	2	273	326	-53

==== Semifinals ====
- Tie played on February 27, 1973 and on March 6, 1973.

Team 1	Agg.	Team 2	1st leg	2nd leg
Maes Pils (Belgium)	177–169	(Spain) CF Barcelona	99–87	78–82

==== Finals ====
- Tie played on March 20, 1973 at Palazzetto dello Sport Parini in Cantù, Italy and on March 27, 1973 at Sporthal Winketkaai in Mechelen, Belgium.

Team 1	Agg.	Team 2	1st leg	2nd leg
Birra Forst Cantù (Italy)	191–169	(Belgium) Maes Pils	106–75	85–94

=== 1973–74 FIBA Korać Cup, 3rd–tier ===
The 1973–74 FIBA Korać Cup was the 3rd installment of the European 3rd-tier level professional basketball club competition FIBA Korać Cup, running from November 6, 1973 to April 11, 1974. The trophy was won by the title holder Birra Forst Cantù, who defeated Partizan in a two-legged final on a home and away basis. Overall, Maes Pils achieved in present competition a record of 2 wins against 2 defeats, in two successive rounds. More detailed:

==== First round ====
- Tie played on November 6, 1973 and on November 13, 1973.

Team 1	Agg.	Team 2	1st leg	2nd leg
Etzella (Luxembourg)	145–228	(Belgium) Maes Pils	83–127	62–101

==== Second round ====
- Tie played on November 27, 1973 and on December 4, 1973.

Team 1	Agg.	Team 2	1st leg	2nd leg
AŠK Olimpija (Socialist Federal Republic of Yugoslavia)	191–181	(Belgium) Maes Pils	90–85	101–96

=== 1974–75 FIBA European Champions Cup, 1st–tier ===
The 1974–75 FIBA European Champions Cup was the 18th installment of the European top-tier level professional basketball club competition FIBA European Champions Cup (now called EuroLeague), running from November 7, 1974 to April 10, 1975. The trophy was won by Ignis Varese, who defeated the title holder Real Madrid by a result of 79–65 at Arena Deurne in Antwerp, Belgium. Overall, Maes Pils achieved in present competition a record of 4 wins against 7 defeats, plus 1 draw, in two successive rounds. More detailed:

==== Second round ====
Tie played on November 28, 1974 and on December 5, 1974.

Team 1	Agg.	Team 2	1st leg	2nd leg
SSV Hagen (West Germany)	168–184	(Belgium) Maes Pils	85–81	83–103

==== Top 12 ====
- Day 1 (January 3, 1975) / Day 2 (January 8, 1975)

Team 1	Agg.	Team 2	1st leg	2nd leg
Maes Pils (Belgium)	174–146	(Bulgaria) Balkan Botevgrad	113–77	61–69

- Day 3 (January 16, 1975) / Day 4 (January 23, 1975)

Team 1	Agg.	Team 2	1st leg	2nd leg
Maes Pils (Belgium)	169–184	(Socialist Federal Republic of Yugoslavia) Zadar	91–94	78–90

- Day 5 (January 30, 1975) / Day 6 (February 6, 1975)

Team 1	Agg.	Team 2	1st leg	2nd leg
Slavia VŠ Praha (Czechoslovakia)	165–193	(Belgium) Maes Pils	85–85	80–108

- Day 7 (February 13, 1975) / Day 8 (February 20, 1975)

Team 1	Agg.	Team 2	1st leg	2nd leg
Maes Pils (Belgium)	188–177	(Austria) Sefra Wien	99–76	89–101

- Day 9 (February 27, 1975) / Day 10 (March 5, 1975)

Team 1	Agg.	Team 2	1st leg	2nd leg
Maes Pils (Belgium)	171–207	(Italy) Ignis Varese	87–99	84–108

- Group A standings:

	Team	Pld	Pts	W	L	PF	PA	PD
1.	(Italy) Ignis Varese	5	10	5	0	990	789	+121
2.	(Socialist Federal Republic of Yugoslavia) Zadar	5	9	4	1	909	819	+90
3.	(Belgium) Maes Pils	5	8	3	2	895	879	+16
4.	(Austria) Sefra Wien	5	7	2	3	803	863	-60
5.	(Bulgaria) Balkan Botevgrad	5	6	1	4	746	889	-143
6.	(Czechoslovakia) Slavia VŠ Praha	5	5	0	5	771	875	-104

=== 1975–76 FIBA European Champions Cup, 1st–tier ===
The 1975–76 FIBA European Champions Cup was the 19th installment of the European top-tier level professional basketball club competition FIBA European Champions Cup (now called EuroLeague), running from October 30, 1975 to April 1, 1976. The trophy was won by the title holder Mobilgirgi Varese, who defeated Real Madrid by a result of 81–74 at Patinoire des Vernets in Geneva, Switzerland. Overall, Maes Pils achieved in present competition a record of 5 wins against 4 defeats, plus 1 draw, in two successive rounds. More detailed:

==== Second round ====
- Bye: Maes Pils qualified without games.

==== Top 12 ====
- Day 1 (December 11, 1975) / Day 2 (December 18, 1975)

Team 1	Agg.	Team 2	1st leg	2nd leg
Maes Pils (Belgium)	205–162	(Finland) Turun NMKY	124–75	81–87

- Day 3 (January 8, 1976) / Day 4 (January 15, 1976)

Team 1	Agg.	Team 2	1st leg	2nd leg
Maes Pils (Belgium)	173–151	(Bulgaria) Academic	103–81	70–70

- Day 5 (January 22, 1976) / Day 6 (January 29, 1976)

Team 1	Agg.	Team 2	1st leg	2nd leg
Mobilgirgi Varese (Italy)	136–129	(Belgium) Maes Pils	74–58	62–71

- Day 7 (February 5, 1976) / Day 8 (February 12, 1976)

Team 1	Agg.	Team 2	1st leg	2nd leg
Zadar (Socialist Federal Republic of Yugoslavia)	177–193	(Belgium) Maes Pils	93–90	84–103

- Day 9 (February 19, 1976) / Day 10 (February 26, 1976)

Team 1	Agg.	Team 2	1st leg	2nd leg
Maes Pils (Belgium)	147–154	(France) ASVEL	87–70	60–84

- Group A standings:

	Team	Pld	Pts	W	L	PF	PA	PD
1.	(Italy) Mobilgirgi Varese	5	10	5	0	886	729	+157
2.	(France) ASVEL	5	9	4	1	783	764	+19
3.	(Belgium) Maes Pils	5	8	3	2	847	780	+67
4.	(Bulgaria) Academic	5	6	1	4	813	871	-58
5.	(Finland) Turun NMKY	5	6	1	4	784	913	-129
6.	(Socialist Federal Republic of Yugoslavia) Zadar	5	6	1	4	817	873	-56

=== 1976–77 FIBA European Champions Cup, 1st–tier ===
The 1976–77 FIBA European Champions Cup was the 20th installment of the European top-tier level professional basketball club competition FIBA European Champions Cup (now called EuroLeague), running from October 14, 1976 to April 7, 1977. The trophy was won by Maccabi Tel Aviv, who defeated the title holder Mobilgirgi Varese by result of 78–77 at Hala Pionir in Belgrade, SFR Yugoslavia. Overall, Maes Pils achieved in present competition a record of 10 wins against 6 defeats, in two successive rounds. More detailed:

==== First round ====
- Day 1 (October 14, 1976)

Team 1	Score	Team 2
Kinzo Amstelveen (Netherlands)	62–63	(Belgium) Maes Pils

- Day 2 (October 21, 1976)

Team 1	Score	Team 2
ASPO Tours (France)	81–83	(Belgium) Maes Pils

- Day 3 (October 28, 1976)

Team 1	Score	Team 2
Maes Pils (Belgium)	89–55	(Austria) Shopping Centre Wien

- Day 4 (November 4, 1976)

Team 1	Score	Team 2
Maes Pils (Belgium)	80–64	(Netherlands) Kinzo Amstelveen

- Day 5 (November 18, 1976)

Team 1	Score	Team 2
Maes Pils (Belgium)	61–63	(France) ASPO Tours

- Day 6 (November 25, 1976)

Team 1	Score	Team 2
Shopping Centre Wien (Austria)	68–69	(Belgium) Maes Pils

- Group D standings:

	Team	Pld	Pts	W	L	PF	PA	PD
1.	(Belgium) Maes Pils	6	11	5	1	445	393	+52
2.	(France) ASPO Tours	6	9	3	3	553	540	+13
3.	(Austria) Shopping Centre Wien	6	8	2	4	523	534	-11
4.	(Netherlands) Kinzo Amstelveen	6	8	2	4	488	542	-54

==== Semifinals ====
- Day 1 (December 8, 1976)

Team 1	Score	Team 2
Mobilgirgi Varese (Italy)	83–61	(Belgium) Maes Pils

- Day 2 (December 16, 1976)

Team 1	Score	Team 2
Maes Pils (Belgium)	71–81	(Spain) Real Madrid

- Day 3 (January 13, 1977)

Team 1	Score	Team 2
CSKA Moscow (Soviet Union)	106–76	(Belgium) Maes Pils

- Day 4 (January 20, 1977)

Team 1	Score	Team 2
Maes Pils (Belgium)	75–66	(Israel) Maccabi Tel Aviv

- Day 5 (January 27, 1977)

Team 1	Score	Team 2
Maes Pils (Belgium)	61–60	(Czechoslovakia) Spartak-Zbrojovka Brno

- Day 6 (February 10, 1977)

Team 1	Score	Team 2
Maes Pils (Belgium)	65–64	(Italy) Mobilgirgi Varese

- Day 7 (February 17, 1977)

Team 1	Score	Team 2
Real Madrid (Spain)	112–75	(Belgium) Maes Pils

- Day 8 (March 3, 1977)

Team 1	Score	Team 2
Maes Pils (Belgium)	77–75	(Soviet Union) CSKA Moscow

- Day 9 (March 10, 1977)

Team 1	Score	Team 2
Maccabi Tel Aviv (Israel)	109–93	(Belgium) Maes Pils

- Day 10 (March 24, 1977)

Team 1	Score	Team 2
Spartak-Zbrojovka Brno (Czechoslovakia)	83–89	(Belgium) Maes Pils

- Semifinals group stage standings:

	Team	Pld	Pts	W	L	PF	PA	PD
1.	(Italy) Mobilgirgi Varese	10	17	7	3	871	788	+83
2.	(Israel) Maccabi Tel Aviv	10	16	6	4	698	699	-1
3.	(Soviet Union) CSKA Moscow	10	16	6	4	869	788	+81
4.	(Spain) Real Madrid	10	16	6	4	998	936	+62
5.	(Belgium) Maes Pils	10	15	5	5	743	839	-96
6.	(Czechoslovakia) Spartak-Zbrojovka Brno	10	10	0	10	740	869	-129

=== 1978–79 FIBA Korać Cup, 3rd–tier ===
The 1978–79 FIBA Korać Cup was the 8th installment of the European 3rd-tier level professional basketball club competition FIBA Korać Cup, running from October 31, 1978 to March 20, 1979. The trophy was won by the title holder Partizan, who defeated Arrigoni Rieti by a result of 108–98 at Hala Pionir in Belgrade, SFR Yugoslavia. Overall, Maes Pils achieved in present competition a record of 1 win against 1 defeat, in one round. More detailed:

==== Second round ====
- Tie played on November 21, 1978 and on November 28, 1978.

Team 1	Agg.	Team 2	1st leg	2nd leg
Hapoel Haifa (Israel)	156–154	(Belgium) Maes Pils	93–70	63–84

== 1980s ==
=== 1980–81 FIBA European Champions Cup, 1st–tier ===
The 1980–81 FIBA European Champions Cup was the 24th installment of the European top-tier level professional basketball club competition FIBA European Champions Cup (now called EuroLeague), running from October 9, 1980 to March 26, 1981. The trophy was won by Maccabi Tel Aviv, who defeated Sinudyne Bologna by a result of 80–79 at the Hall Rhénus in Strasbourg, France. Overall, Maes Pils achieved in present competition a record of 3 wins against 3 defeats, in one round. More detailed:

==== First round ====
- Day 1 (October 9, 1980)

Team 1	Score	Team 2
Śląsk Wrocław (Poland)	103–90	(Belgium) Maes Pils

- Day 2 (October 16, 1980)

Team 1	Score	Team 2
Maes Pils (Belgium)	80–78	(Finland) Pantterit

- Day 3 (October 30, 1980)

Team 1	Score	Team 2
CSKA Moscow (Soviet Union)	88–46	(Belgium) Maes Pils

- Day 4 (November 6, 1980)

Team 1	Score	Team 2
Maes Pils (Belgium)	84–81	(Poland) Śląsk Wrocław

- Day 5 (November 13, 1980)

Team 1	Score	Team 2
Pantterit (Finland)	64–86	(Belgium) Maes Pils

- Day 6 (November 20, 1980)

Team 1	Score	Team 2
Maes Pils (Belgium)	86–95	(Soviet Union) CSKA Moscow

- Group F standings:

	Team	Pld	Pts	W	L	PF	PA	PD
1.	(Soviet Union) CSKA Moscow	6	12	6	0	554	442	+112
2.	(Belgium) Maes Pils	6	9	3	3	472	509	-37
3.	(Poland) Śląsk Wrocław	6	8	2	4	542	557	-15
4.	(Finland) Pantterit	6	7	1	5	469	529	-60

=== 1981–82 FIBA Korać Cup, 3rd–tier ===
The 1981–82 FIBA Korać Cup was the 11th installment of the European 3rd-tier level professional basketball club competition FIBA Korać Cup, running from October 7, 1981 to March 18, 1982. The trophy was won by Limoges CSP, who defeated Šibenka by a result of 90–84 at Palasport San Lazzaro in Padua, Italy. Overall, Maes Pils achieved in present competition a record of 2 wins against 2 defeats, in two successive rounds. More detailed:

==== First round ====
- Tie played on October 7, 1981 and on October 14, 1981.

Team 1	Agg.	Team 2	1st leg	2nd leg
Olympiacos (Greece)	139–156	(Belgium) Maes Pils	79–60	60–96

==== Second round ====
- Tie played on November 4, 1981 and on November 11, 1981.

Team 1	Agg.	Team 2	1st leg	2nd leg
Miñón Valladolid (Spain)	171–157	(Belgium) Maes Pils	100–79	71–78

=== 1982–83 FIBA Korać Cup, 3rd–tier ===
The 1982–83 FIBA Korać Cup was the 12th installment of the European 3rd-tier level professional basketball club competition FIBA Korać Cup, running from October 6, 1982 to March 8, 1983. The trophy was won by the title holder Limoges CSP, who defeated -for second consecutive time- Šibenka by a result of 94–86 at Deutschlandhalle in West Berlin, West Germany. Overall, Maes Pils achieved in present competition a record of 3 wins against 7 defeats, in three successive rounds. More detailed:

==== First round ====
- Tie played on October 6, 1982 and on October 13, 1982.

Team 1	Agg.	Team 2	1st leg	2nd leg
Karşıyaka (Turkey)	150–156	(Belgium) Maes Pils	64–63	86-93

==== Second round ====
- Tie played on November 3, 1982 and on November 10, 1982.

Team 1	Agg.	Team 2	1st leg	2nd leg
Merkur Graz (Austria)	165–201	(Belgium) Maes Pils	81–92	84-109

==== Top 16 ====
- Day 1 (December 8, 1982)

Team 1	Score	Team 2
CAI Zaragoza (Spain)	81–73	(Belgium) Maes Pils

- Day 2 (December 15, 1982)

Team 1	Score	Team 2
Maes Pils (Belgium)	84–92	(Socialist Federal Republic of Yugoslavia) Zadar

- Day 3 (January 12, 1983)

Team 1	Score	Team 2
Tours (France)	86–83	(Belgium) Maes Pils

- Day 4 (January 19, 1983)

Team 1	Score	Team 2
Maes Pils (Belgium)	70–72	(Spain) CAI Zaragoza

- Day 5 (January 26, 1983)

Team 1	Score	Team 2
Zadar (Socialist Federal Republic of Yugoslavia)	89–79	(Belgium) Maes Pils

- Day 6 (February 2, 1983)

Team 1	Score	Team 2
Maes Pils (Belgium)	91–97	(France) Tours

- Group B standings:

	Team	Pld	Pts	W	L	PF	PA	PD
1.	(Socialist Federal Republic of Yugoslavia) Zadar	6	10	4	2	550	526	+24
2.	(Spain) CAI Zaragoza	6	10	4	2	510	503	-7
3.	(France) Tours	6	10	4	2	541	535	+6
4.	(Belgium) Maes Pils	6	6	0	6	480	517	-37

=== 1984–85 FIBA Korać Cup, 3rd–tier ===
The 1984–85 FIBA Korać Cup was the 14th installment of the European 3rd-tier level professional basketball club competition FIBA Korać Cup, running from October 3, 1984 to March 21, 1985. The trophy was won by Simac Milano, who defeated Ciaocrem Varese by a result of 91–78 at Palais du Midi in Brussels, Belgium. Overall, Maes Pils achieved in present competition a record of 1 win against 1 defeat, in only one round. More detailed:

==== First round ====
- Tie played on October 3, 1984 and on October 10, 1984.

Team 1	Agg.	Team 2	1st leg	2nd leg
Maes Pils (Belgium)	146–148	(Spain) Clesa Ferrol	81–72	65–76

=== 1985–86 FIBA Korać Cup, 3rd–tier ===
The 1985–86 FIBA Korać Cup was the 15th installment of the European 3rd-tier level professional basketball club competition FIBA Korać Cup, running from October 2, 1985 to March 27, 1986. The trophy was won by Banco di Roma Virtus, who defeated Mobilgirgi Caserta in a two-legged final on a home and away basis. Overall, Maes Pils achieved in present competition a record of 3 wins against 1 defeats, in two successive rounds. More detailed:

==== First round ====
- Tie played on October 2, 1985 and on October 9, 1985.

Team 1	Agg.	Team 2	1st leg	2nd leg
Regenerin Klagenfurt (Austria)	141–234	(Belgium) Maes Pils	69–109	72-125

==== Second round ====
- Tie played on October 30, 1985 and on November 6, 1985.

Team 1	Agg.	Team 2	1st leg	2nd leg
Cacaolat Granollers (Spain)	177–176	(Belgium) Maes Pils	94–91	83-85

=== 1986–87 FIBA European Cup Winners' Cup, 2nd–tier ===
The 1986–87 FIBA European Cup Winners' Cup was the 21st installment of FIBA's 2nd-tier level European-wide professional club basketball competition FIBA European Cup Winners' Cup (lately called FIBA Saporta Cup), running from September 30, 1986, to March 17, 1987. The trophy was won by Cibona, who defeated Scavolini Pesaro by a result of 89–74 at Dvorana SPC Vojvodina in Novi Sad, SFR Yugoslavia. Overall, Maes Pils achieved in present competition a record of 5 wins against 5 defeats, in three successive rounds. More detailed:

==== First round ====
- Tie played on September 30, 1986 and on October 7, 1986.

Team 1	Agg.	Team 2	1st leg	2nd leg
Polycell Kingston (England)	189–195	(Belgium) Maes Pils	99–91	90–104

==== Second round ====
- Tie played on October 28, 1986 and on November 4, 1986.

Team 1	Agg.	Team 2	1st leg	2nd leg
Steiner Bayreuth (West Germany)	157–190	(Belgium) Maes Pils	83–85	74–105

==== Quarterfinals ====
- Day 1 (December 2, 1986)

Team 1	Score	Team 2
Maes Pils (Belgium)	111–90	(Turkey) Efes Pilsen

- Day 2 (December 9, 1986)

Team 1	Score	Team 2
Maes Pils (Belgium)	98–121	(Socialist Federal Republic of Yugoslavia) Cibona

- Day 3 (January 6, 1987)

Team 1	Score	Team 2
Scavolini Pesaro (Italy)	127–87	(Belgium) Maes Pils

- Day 4 (January 13, 1987)

Team 1	Score	Team 2
Efes Pilsen (Turkey)	89–63	(Belgium) Maes Pils

- Day 5 (January 20, 1987)

Team 1	Score	Team 2
Cibona (Socialist Federal Republic of Yugoslavia)	130–90	(Belgium) Maes Pils

- Day 6 (January 27, 1987)

Team 1	Score	Team 2
Maes Pils (Belgium)	89–84	(Italy) Scavolini Pesaro

- Group B standings:

	Team	Pld	Pts	W	L	PF	PA	PD
1.	(Socialist Federal Republic of Yugoslavia) Cibona	6	12	6	0	668	517	+151
2.	(Italy) Scavolini Pesaro	6	8	2	4	559	535	+24
3.	(Turkey) Efes Pilsen	6	8	2	4	480	552	-72
4.	(Belgium) Maes Pils	6	8	2	4	538	641	-103

=== 1987–88 FIBA European Champions Cup, 1st–tier ===
The 1987–88 FIBA European Champions Cup was the 31st installment of the European top-tier level professional basketball club competition FIBA European Champions Cup (now called EuroLeague), running from September 24, 1987 to April 7, 1988. The trophy was won by the title holder Tracer Milano, who defeated -for second consecutive time- Maccabi Tel Aviv by a result of 90–84 at Flanders Expo Pavilion in Ghent, Belgium. Overall, Maes Pils achieved in present competition a record of 1 win against 1 defeat, in only one round. More detailed:

==== First round ====
- Tie played on September 24, 1987 and on October 1, 1987.

Team 1	Agg.	Team 2	1st leg	2nd leg
Södertälje (Sweden)	179–159	(Belgium) Maes Pils	89–93	90–69

=== 1988–89 FIBA Korać Cup, 3rd–tier ===
The 1988–89 FIBA Korać Cup was the 18th installment of the European 3rd-tier level professional basketball club competition FIBA Korać Cup, running from October 12, 1988 to March 22, 1989. The trophy was won by Partizan, who defeated Wiwa Vismara Cantù in a two-legged final on a home and away basis. Overall, Maes Pils achieved in present competition a record of 3 wins against 7 defeats, in three successive rounds. More detailed:

==== First round ====
- Tie played on October 12, 1988 and on October 19, 1988.

Team 1	Agg.	Team 2	1st leg	2nd leg
Maes Pils (Belgium)	171–170	(Portugal) Benfica	83–75	88–95*

^{*}The score in the second leg at the end of the regulation was 84–76 for Benfica, so it was necessary to play an extra-time to decide the winner of this match.

==== Second round ====
- Tie played on November 2, 1988 and November 9, 1988.

Team 1	Agg.	Team 2	1st leg	2nd leg
CajaCanarias (Spain)	165–169	(Belgium) Maes Pils	81–72	84–97

==== Top 16 ====
- Day 1 (December 7, 1988)

Team 1	Score	Team 2
Maes Pils (Belgium)	88–101	(Socialist Federal Republic of Yugoslavia) Crvena zvezda

- Day 2 (December 14, 1988)

Team 1	Score	Team 2
CAI Zaragoza (Spain)	82–75	(Belgium) Maes Pils

- Day 3 (January 11, 1989)

Team 1	Score	Team 2
Maes Pils (Belgium)	88–93	(Italy) Philips Milano

- Day 4 (January 18, 1989)

Team 1	Score	Team 2
Crvena zvezda (Socialist Federal Republic of Yugoslavia)	83–76	(Belgium) Maes Pils

- Day 5 (January 25, 1989)

Team 1	Score	Team 2
Maes Pils (Belgium)	100–80	(Spain) CAI Zaragoza

- Day 6 (February 1, 1989)

Team 1	Score	Team 2
Philips Milano (Italy)	93–72	(Belgium) Maes Pils

- Group C standings:

	Team	Pld	Pts	W	L	PF	PA	PD
1.	(Italy) Philips Milano	6	12	6	0	577	479	+98
2.	(Socialist Federal Republic of Yugoslavia) Crvena zvezda	6	9	3	3	498	541	-43
3.	(Spain) CAI Zaragoza	6	8	2	4	506	528	-22
4.	(Belgium) Maes Pils	6	7	1	5	499	532	-33

== 1990s ==
=== 1989–90 FIBA European Champions Cup, 1st–tier ===
The 1989–90 FIBA European Champions Cup was the 33rd installment of the European top-tier level professional basketball club competition FIBA European Champions Cup (now called EuroLeague), running from September 28, 1989 to April 19, 1990. The trophy was won by the title holder Jugoplastika, who defeated FC Barcelona by a result of 72–67 at Pabellón Príncipe Felipe in Zaragoza, Spain. Overall, Maes Pils achieved in present competition a record of 3 wins against 1 defeat, in two successive rounds. More detailed:

==== First round ====
- Tie played on September 28, 1989 and on October 5, 1989.

Team 1	Agg.	Team 2	1st leg	2nd leg
Partizani Tirana (Albania)	132-202	(Belgium) Maes Pils	68–89	64–113

==== Top 16 ====
- Tie played on October 26, 1989 and on November 2, 1989.

Team 1	Agg.	Team 2	1st leg	2nd leg
Commodore Den Helder (Netherlands)	169-154	(Belgium) Maes Pils	99–70	70–84

=== 1990–91 FIBA European Champions Cup, 1st–tier ===
The 1990–91 FIBA European Champions Cup was the 34th installment of the European top-tier level professional basketball club competition FIBA European Champions Cup (now called EuroLeague), running from September 27, 1990 to April 18, 1991. The trophy was won by the title holder Pop 84, who defeated -for second consecutive time- FC Barcelona by a result of 70–65 at Palais Omnisports de Paris-Bercy, in Paris, France. Overall, Maes Pils achieved in present competition a record of 3 wins against 1 defeat, in two successive rounds. More detailed:

==== First round ====
- Tie played on September 27, 1990 and on October 4, 1990.

Team 1	Agg.	Team 2	1st leg	2nd leg
Lech Poznań (Poland)	163–216	(Belgium) Maes Pils	86–109	77–107

==== Top 16 ====
- Tie played on October 25, 1990 and on November 1, 1990.

Team 1	Agg.	Team 2	1st leg	2nd leg
Bayer 04 Leverkusen (West Germany)	188–182	(Belgium) Maes Pils	103–88	85–94

=== 1991–92 FIBA European League, 1st–tier ===
The 1991–92 FIBA European League was the 35th installment of the European top-tier level professional club competition for basketball clubs (now called EuroLeague), running from September 12, 1991 to April 16, 1992. The trophy was won by Partizan, who defeated Montigalà Joventut by a result of 71–70 at held at Abdi İpekçi Arena in Istanbul, Turkey. Overall, Maes Pils achieved in present competition a record of 8 wins against 10 defeats, in three successive rounds. More detailed:

==== First round ====
- Tie played on September 11, 1991 and on September 19, 1991.

Team 1	Agg.	Team 2	1st leg	2nd leg
Möllersdorf Traiskirchen (Austria)	158–213	(Belgium) Maes Pils	78–107	80–106

==== Second round ====
- Tie played on October 3, 1991 and on October 10, 1991.

Team 1	Agg.	Team 2	1st leg	2nd leg
Maes Pils (Belgium)	175–150	(England) Kingston Kings	86–76	89–74

==== Top 16 ====
- Day 1 (October 31, 1991)

Team 1	Score	Team 2
Maes Pils (Belgium)	68–97	(Italy) Philips Milano

- Day 2 (November 7, 1991)

Team 1	Score	Team 2
Partizan (Federal Republic of Yugoslavia)	87–67	(Belgium) Maes Pils

- Day 3 (November 28, 1991)

Team 1	Score	Team 2
Maes Pils (Belgium)	70–89	(Germany) Bayer 04 Leverkusen

- Day 4 (December 5, 1991)

Team 1	Score	Team 2
Estudiantes Caja Postal (Spain)	101–83	(Belgium) Maes Pils

- Day 5 (December 12, 1991)

Team 1	Score	Team 2
Maes Pils (Belgium)	92–76	(Greece) Aris

- Day 6 (December 19, 1991)

Team 1	Score	Team 2
Commodore Den Helder (Netherlands)	77–79	(Belgium) Maes Pils

- Day 7 (January 9, 1992)

Team 1	Score	Team 2
Maes Pils (Belgium)	80–101	(Spain) Montigalà Joventut

- Day 8 (January 16, 1992)

Team 1	Score	Team 2
Philips Milano (Italy)	113–93	(Belgium) Maes Pils

- Day 9 (January 23, 1992)

Team 1	Score	Team 2
Maes Pils (Belgium)	86–72	(Federal Republic of Yugoslavia) Partizan

- Day 10 (January 30, 1992)

Team 1	Score	Team 2
Bayer 04 Leverkusen (Germany)	98–89	(Belgium) Maes Pils

- Day 11 (February 6, 1992)

Team 1	Score	Team 2
Maes Pils (Belgium)	68–73	(Spain) Estudiantes Caja Postal

- Day 12 (February 13, 1992)

Team 1	Score	Team 2
Aris (Greece)	86–84	(Belgium) Maes Pils

- Day 13 (February 20, 1992)

Team 1	Score	Team 2
Maes Pils (Belgium)	75–64	(Netherlands) Commodore Den Helder

- Day 14 (February 27, 1992)

Team 1	Score	Team 2
Montigalà Joventut (Spain)	96–78	(Belgium) Maes Pils

- Group B standings:

	Team	Pld	Pts	W	L	PF	PA	PD
1.	(Spain) Montigalà Joventut	14	25	11	3	1276	1114	+162
2.	(Spain) Estudiantes Caja Postal	14	24	10	4	1145	1096	+49
3.	(Italy) Philips Milano	14	24	10	4	1264	1161	+103
4.	(Federal Republic of Yugoslavia) Partizan^{*}	14	23	9	5	1178	1077	+101
5.	(Germany) Bayer 04 Leverkusen	14	21	7	7	1217	1154	+63
6.	(Belgium) Maes Pils	14	18	4	10	1112	1230	-118
7.	(Greece) Aris	14	17	3	11	1139	1359	-220
8.	(Netherlands) Commodore Den Helder	14	16	2	12	1050	1190	-140

^{*}Due to the Yugoslav Wars after the Breakup of Yugoslavia, the three former Yugoslav teams entering this Group Stage are forced to play all their home games outside their country. Curiously, all of them chose Spanish cities as their new "home court": Eventual winner Partizan played in Fuenlabrada, title holder Slobodna Dalmacija in A Coruña and Cibona in Puerto Real.

=== 1992–93 FIBA European League, 1st–tier ===
The 1992–93 FIBA European League was the 36th installment of the European top-tier level professional club competition for basketball clubs (now called EuroLeague), running from September 10, 1992 to April 15, 1993. The trophy was won by Limoges CSP, who defeated Benetton Treviso by a result of 59–55 at Peace and Friendship Stadium in Piraeus, Greece. Overall, Maes Pils achieved in present competition a record of 4 wins against 14 defeats, in three successive rounds. More detailed:

==== First round ====
- Tie played on September 10, 1992 and on September 16, 1992.

Team 1	Agg.	Team 2	1st leg	2nd leg
Scania Södertälje (Sweden)	169–190	(Belgium) Maes Pils	86–93	83–97

==== Second round ====
- Tie played on October 1, 1992 and on October 8, 1992.

Team 1	Agg.	Team 2	1st leg	2nd leg
Hapoel Tel Aviv (Israel)	164–170	(Belgium) Maes Pils	88–80	76–90

==== Top 16 ====
- Day 1 (October 28, 1992)

Team 1	Score	Team 2
Pau-Orthez (France)	107–103	(Belgium) Maes Pils

^{*}Overtime at the end of regulation (93–93).

- Day 2 (November 5, 1992)

Team 1	Score	Team 2
Maes Pils (Belgium)	93–75	(Croatia) Zadar

- Day 3 (November 26, 1992)

Team 1	Score	Team 2
Maes Pils (Belgium)	84–86	(Italy) Benetton Treviso

- Day 4 (December 2, 1992)

Team 1	Score	Team 2
Real Madrid Teka (Spain)	93–76	(Belgium) Maes Pils

- Day 5 (December 9, 1992)

Team 1	Score	Team 2
Estudiantes Argentaria (Spain)	100–68	(Belgium) Maes Pils

- Day 6 (December 17, 1992)

Team 1	Score	Team 2
Maes Pils (Belgium)	69–77	(Germany) Bayer 04 Leverkusen

- Day 7 (January 7, 1993)

Team 1	Score	Team 2
Olympiacos (Greece)	79–60	(Belgium) Maes Pils

- Day 8 (January 14, 1993)

Team 1	Score	Team 2
Maes Pils (Belgium)	73–75	(France) Pau-Orthez

- Day 9 (January 21, 1993)

Team 1	Score	Team 2
Zadar (Croatia)	77–67	(Belgium) Maes Pils

- Day 10 (January 28, 1993)

Team 1	Score	Team 2
Benetton Treviso (Italy)	113–95	(Belgium) Maes Pils

- Day 11 (February 3, 1993)

Team 1	Score	Team 2
Maes Pils (Belgium)	90–98*	(Spain) Real Madrid Teka

^{*}Overtime at the end of regulation (83–83).

- Day 12 (February 11, 1993)

Team 1	Score	Team 2
Maes Pils (Belgium)	85–93*	(Spain) Estudiantes Argentaria

^{*}Overtime at the end of regulation (79–79).

- Day 13 (February 17, 1993)

Team 1	Score	Team 2
Bayer 04 Leverkusen (Germany)	78–63	(Belgium) Maes Pils

- Day 14 (February 24, 1993)

Team 1	Score	Team 2
Maes Pils (Belgium)	66–85	(Greece) Olympiacos

- Group B standings:

	Team	Pld	Pts	W	L	PF	PA	PD
1.	(Spain) Real Madrid Teka	14	26	12	2	1181	1031	+150
2.	(Italy) Benetton Treviso	14	24	10	4	1127	1073	+54
3.	(Greece) Olympiacos	14	22	8	6	1057	1023	+34
4.	(France) Pau-Orthez	14	22	8	6	1113	1100	+13
5.	(Germany) Bayer 04 Leverkusen	14	22	8	6	1099	1105	-6
6.	(Croatia) Zadar	14	19	5	9	1096	1198	-102
7.	(Spain) Estudiantes Argentaria	14	18	4	10	1132	1131	+1
8.	(Belgium) Maes Pils	14	15	1	13	1092	1236	-144

=== 1993–94 FIBA European League, 1st–tier ===
The 1993–94 FIBA European League was the 37th installment of the European top-tier level professional club competition for basketball clubs (now called EuroLeague), running from September 9, 1993 to April 21, 1994. The trophy was won by 7up Joventut, who defeated Olympiacos by a result of 59–57 at Yad Eliyahu Arena in Tel Aviv, Israel. Overall, Maes Pils achieved in present competition a record of 9 wins against 7 defeats, in two successive rounds. More detailed:

==== Second round ====
- Tie played on September 30, 1993 and on October 7, 1993.

Team 1	Agg.	Team 2	1st leg	2nd leg
Croatia Osiguranje	132–146	(Belgium) Maes Pils	72–63	60–83

==== Top 16 ====
- Day 1 (October 28, 1993)

Team 1	Score	Team 2
Guildford Kings (England)	71–97	(Belgium) Maes Pils

- Day 2 (November 3, 1993)

Team 1	Score	Team 2
Maes Pils (Belgium)	78–77	(Spain) Real Madrid Teka

- Day 3 (November 24, 1993)

Team 1	Score	Team 2
Maes Pils (Belgium)	86–85	(Italy) Benetton Treviso

- Day 4 (December 1, 1993)

Team 1	Score	Team 2
Banca Catalana FC Barcelona (Spain)	84–63	(Belgium) Maes Pils

- Day 5 (December 9, 1993)

Team 1	Score	Team 2
Olympiacos (Greece)	71–63	(Belgium) Maes Pils

- Day 6 (December 15, 1993)

Team 1	Score	Team 2
Maes Pils (Belgium)	73–64	(France) Limoges CSP

- Day 7 (January 6, 1994)

Team 1	Score	Team 2
Bayer 04 Leverkusen (Germany)	73–86	(Belgium) Maes Pils

- Day 8 (January 12, 1994)

Team 1	Score	Team 2
Maes Pils (Belgium)	91–65	(England) Guildford Kings

- Day 9 (January 20, 1994)

Team 1	Score	Team 2
Real Madrid Teka (Spain)	82–60	(Belgium) Maes Pils

- Day 10 (January 27, 1994)

Team 1	Score	Team 2
Benetton Treviso (Italy)	89–73	(Belgium) Maes Pils

- Day 11 (February 2, 1994)

Team 1	Score	Team 2
Maes Pils (Belgium)	77–71	(Spain) Banca Catalana FC Barcelona

- Day 12 (February 10, 1994)

Team 1	Score	Team 2
Maes Pils (Belgium)	70–86	(Greece) Olympiacos

- Day 13 (February 16, 1994)

Team 1	Score	Team 2
Limoges CSP (France)	90–53	(Belgium) Maes Pils

- Day 14 (February 23, 1994)

Team 1	Score	Team 2
Maes Pils (Belgium)	70–64	(Germany) Bayer 04 Leverkusen

- Group A standings:

	Team	Pld	Pts	W	L	PF	PA	PD
1.	(Greece) Olympiacos	14	25	11	3	1047	897	+150
2.	(Spain) Real Madrid Teka	14	23	9	5	1123	978	+145
3.	(France) Limoges CSP	14	23	9	5	1013	979	+34
4.	(Spain) Banca Catalana FC Barcelona	14	22	8	6	1132	1067	+65
5.	(Belgium) Maes Pils	14	22	8	6	1040	1072	-32
6.	(Italy) Benetton Treviso	14	21	7	7	1085	1072	+13
7.	(Germany) Bayer 04 Leverkusen	14	18	4	10	1022	1045	-23
8.	(England) Guildford Kings	14	14	0	14	889	1241	-352

=== 1994–95 FIBA European League, 1st–tier ===
The 1994–95 FIBA European League was the 38th installment of the European top-tier level professional club competition for basketball clubs (now called EuroLeague), running from September 8, 1994 to April 13, 1995. The trophy was won by Real Madrid Teka, who defeated Olympiacos by a result of 73–61 at Pabellón Príncipe Felipe in Zaragoza, Spain. Overall, Maes Flandria achieved in present competition a record of 1 win against 1 defeat, in only one round. More detailed:

==== Second round ====
- Tie played on September 29, 1994 and on October 6, 1994.

Team 1	Agg.	Team 2	1st leg	2nd leg
Smelt Olimpija (Slovenia)	148–136	(Belgium) Maes Flandria	85–61	63–75

In losers of the second round in this competition are given a wild card to participate in the third round of 1994–95 FIBA European Cup, European 2nd-tier level professional club competition for basketball clubs (later called FIBA Saporta Cup):

==== Third round, 1994–95 FIBA European Cup, 2nd–tier ====
- Tie played on October 25, 1994 and on November 2, 1994.

Team 1	Agg.	Team 2	1st leg	2nd leg
Danone Honvéd (Hungary)	150–185	(Belgium) Maes Flandria	80–94	70–91

==== Top 12, 1994–95 FIBA European Cup, 2nd–tier ====
- Day 1 (November 22, 1994)

Team 1	Score	Team 2
Iraklis Aspis Pronoia (Greece)	89–87	(Belgium) Maes Flandria

- Day 2 (November 29, 1994)

Team 1	Score	Team 2
Croatia Osiguranje	70–65	(Belgium) Maes Flandria

- Day 3 (December 6, 1994)

Team 1	Score	Team 2
Maes Flandria (Belgium)	79–83	(France) Olympique Antibes

- Day 4 (December 14, 1994)

Team 1	Score	Team 2
Maes Flandria (Belgium)	107–53	(Ukraine) Kyiv

- Day 5 (January 4, 1995)

Team 1	Score	Team 2
Fidefinanz Bellinzona (Switzerland)	66–68	(Belgium) Maes Flandria

- Day 6 (January 10, 1995)

Team 1	Score	Team 2
Maes Flandria (Belgium)	69–92	(Greece) Iraklis Aspis Pronoia

- Day 7 (January 18, 1995)

Team 1	Score	Team 2
Maes Flandria (Belgium)	65–84	Croatia Osiguranje

- Day 8 (January 24, 1995)

Team 1	Score	Team 2
Olympique Antibes (France)	105–86	(Belgium) Maes Flandria

- Day 9 (January 31, 1995)

Team 1	Score	Team 2
Kyiv (Ukraine)	98–101	(Belgium) Maes Flandria

- Day 10 (February 8, 1995)

Team 1	Score	Team 2
Maes Flandria (Belgium)	78–67	(Switzerland) Fidefinanz Bellinzona

- Group A standings:

	Team	Pld	Pts	W	L	PF	PA	PD
1.	(France) Olympique Antibes	10	19	9	1	857	752	+105
2.	(Greece) Iraklis Aspis Pronoia	10	19	9	1	809	715	+93
3.	Croatia Osiguranje	10	15	5	5	766	731	+35
4.	(Belgium) Maes Flandria	10	14	4	6	805	807	-2
5.	(Ukraine) Kyiv	10	12	2	8	817	934	-117
6.	(Switzerland) Fidefinanz Bellinzona	10	11	1	9	669	784	-125

Overall, Maes Flandria achieved in present competition a record of 6 wins against 6 defeats, in two successive rounds.
