= Kimmo Muurinen =

Finnish basketball player (born 1981)

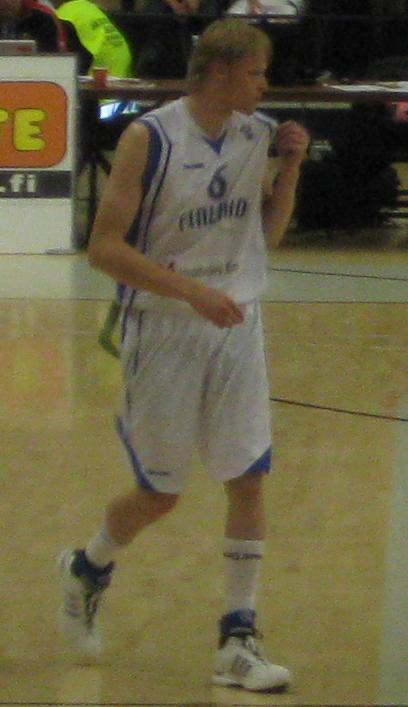
- Muurinen in 2010

Personal information
- Born: February 23, 1981 (age 44); Vantaa, Finland
- Listed height: 6 ft 8 in (2.03 m)
- Listed weight: 222 lb (101 kg)

Career information
- College: Little Rock (2002–2004)
- NBA draft: 2004: undrafted
- Playing career: 2000–present
- Position: Power forward

Career history
- 2000–2001: Pantterit
- 2001–2002: Pussihukat
- 2004–2009: Espoon Honka
- 2009–2010: NSB Napoli
- 2010: Scafati Basket
- 2010–2011: Skyliners Frankfurt
- 2011–2012: Torpan Pojat
- 2012–2013: Nilan Bisons
- 2013–2014: Tapiolan Honka

Career highlights
- 3x Finnish Korisliiga champion (2007, 2008, 2013); Korisliiga Rookie of the Year (2001)

Kimmo Muurinen (born February 23, 1981) is a Finnish former professional basketball player. He played the majority of his career in his home country of Finland, but also had spells in Germany, Italy and the United States. He is also a long time member of the Finnish national team, which he debuted for in 2000. As of September 2, 2014, he has played 153 games for Finland.

== Personal life ==
Muurinen has been married with Jenni Muurinen (née Laaksonen) who is also a former professional basketball player and played for the Finland women's national basketball team. Their son Miikka Muurinen is also a basketball player.

== Career statistics ==
=== National team ===
Team	Tournament	Pos.	GP	PPG	RPG	APG
Finland	EuroBasket 2011	9th	8	4.6	3.1	1.1
Finland	EuroBasket 2013	9th	8	6.5	3.0	0.3
Finland	2014 FIBA World Cup	22nd	5	2.0	1.6	0.4
