= Naisten Korisliiga =

Finnish women's basketball league

- Current season, competition or edition: 2024–25 Naisten Korisliiga
- Formerly: Koripallon naisten SM-sarja, 1944–2013
- Sport: Basketball
- Founded: 1944
- First season: 1944–45
- No. of teams: 10
- Country: Finland
- Most recent champions: Peli-Karhut (5nd title)
- Most titles: Forssan Alku, Sampo Basket, Tampereen Pyrintö, Nokian Urheilijat (8 titles)
- Broadcaster: YLE TV2
- Relegation to: Naisten I Divisioona
- Domestic cup: Finnish Championship
- Website: Korisliiga.fi

Naisten Korisliiga (Women's Basketball League) is the highest tier of women's basketball in Finland. The competition was formerly known as Koripallon naisten SM-sarja (Women's Basketball Finnish Championship) and was renamed Naisten Korisliiga for the 2013–14 season.

== History ==
Women's Finnish Championship was first introduced in 1944. The first championship was won by Helsingin Tarmo. In the 1940s, the league had six teams and the title was awarded after the regular season. In 1953 the number of teams was raised to ten. Postseason playoffs were first played in the 1973–74 season, with Nokian Urheilijat emerging victorious after defeating first Tapiolan Honka (2–1) in the Semifinals and then Työväen Mailapojat (2–1) in the Finals.

For the 2014–15 season, the league has 10 teams and each team plays each other three times in the regular season, resulting in 27 games per team. The top 8 teams continue to postseason playoffs which are played in Best-of-five format. The team placed last after the regular season is relegated to Naisten I Divisioona (English: Women's First Division).

Lea Hakala could be seen as the most influential player so far in the history of Naisten Korisliiga. Hakala played 25 seasons in the league and currently leads the record for career points. She has won the championship title for record-breaking 15 times and she has also been awarded the Player of the Year Award for 4 times.

== Current teams ==
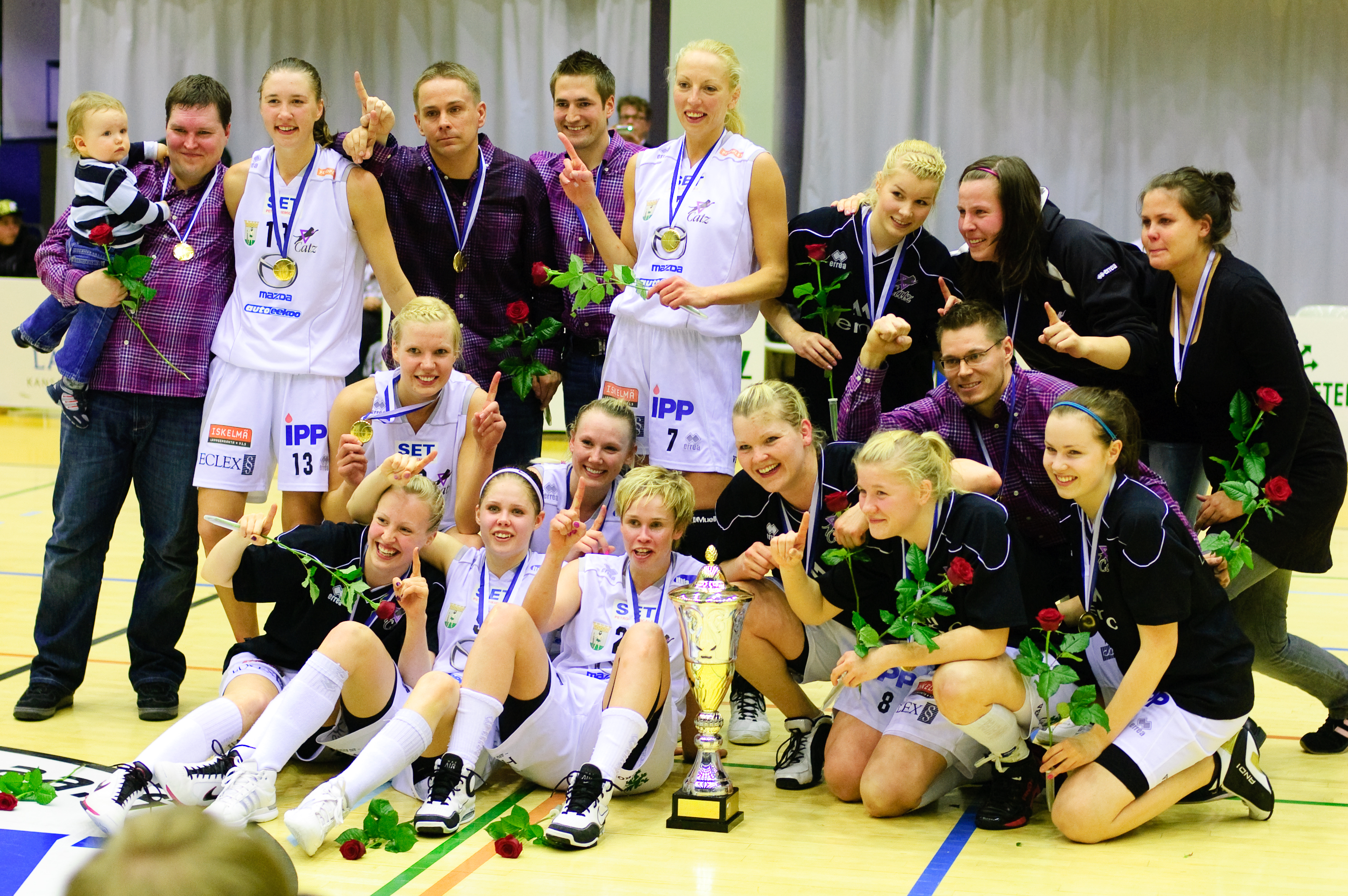
Catz Lappeenranta celebrating their 2009–10 season championship victory.

Teams competing in the 2019–20 Naisten Korisliiga season:

- Catz Lappeenranta, Lappeenranta
- Espoo Basket Team (EBT), Espoo
- Forssan Alku (FoA), Forssa
- HBA-Märsky, Helsinki
- Hyvinkään Ponteva (HyPo), Hyvinkää
- Kouvottaret, Kouvola
- Peli-Karhut (PeKa), Kotka
- Tapiolan Honka, Espoo
- Torpan Pojat (ToPo), Helsinki
- Vimpelin Veto (ViVe), Vimpeli

== Recent champions ==
Season	Champion	Runner-up	Score	Third place
2018–19	Peli-Karhut	Catz Lappeenranta	3–2	Hyvinkään Ponteva
2017–18	Peli-Karhut	Catz Lappeenranta	3–2	Hyvinkään Ponteva
2016–17	Hyvinkään Ponteva	Espoo United	3–1	Catz Lappeenranta
2015–16	Catz Lappeenranta	Hyvinkään Ponteva	3–0	Äänekosken Huima
2014–15	Catz Lappeenranta	Äänekosken Huima	3–0	Torpan Pojat
2013–14	Catz Lappeenranta	Peli-Karhut	3–1	Torpan Pojat
2012–13	Catz Lappeenranta	Peli-Karhut	3–0	Tapiolan Honka
2011–12	Catz Lappeenranta	Äänekosken Huima	3–2	Peli-Karhut
2010–11	Peli-Karhut	Catz Lappeenranta	3–1	Espoo Team
2009–10	Catz Lappeenranta	Peli-Karhut	3–0	Espoo Team
2008–09	Espoo Team	Catz Lappeenranta	3–1	Peli-Karhut
2007–08	Peli-Karhut	Catz Lappeenranta	3–1	Helsingin NMKY
2006–07	Peli-Karhut	Catz Lappeenranta	3–2	Äänekosken Huima
2005–06	Pantterit	Äänekosken Huima	3–2	BC Nokia
2004–05	BC Nokia	Pantterit	3–1	Peli-Karhut

== List of champions ==
Team	Titles	Season
Nokian Urheilijat	8	1971–72, 1973–74, 1974–75, 1975–76, 1977–78, 1978–79, 1979–80, 1980–81
Tampereen Pyrintö	8	1950, 1953, 1955, 1957, 1958, 1982–83, 1983–84, 1985–86
Sampo Basket	8	1965–66, 1968–69, 1969–70, 1976–77, 1981–82, 1984–85, 1986–87, 1987–88
Forssan Alku	8	1988–89, 1992–93, 1993–94, 1994–95, 1995–96, 1996–97, 1997–98, 1998–99
Helsingin Työväen Uimarit	6	1960, 1961, 1962, 1962–63, 1963–64, 1964–65
Pantterit	5	1999-00, 2000–01, 2001–02, 2003–04, 2005–06
Peli-Karhut	5	2006–07, 2007–08, 2010–11, 2017–18, 2018–19
Catz Lappeenranta	4	2009–10, 2011–12, 2012–13, 2013–14
Eiran Kisa-Veikot	3	1945, 1946, 1949
Helsingin Tarmo	3	1944, 1948, 1954
Helsingin Visa	2	1956, 1959
Jyväskylän Kiri	2	1970–71, 1972–73
Pussihukat	2	1990–91, 1991–92
Porin Veto	1	1951
Lahden Koripalloilijat	1	1952
Helsingin Kisa-Toverit	1	1966–67
Työväen Maila-Pojat	1	1967–68
Turun Riento	1	1989–90
Äänekosken Huima	1	2002–03
BC Nokia	1	2004–05
Espoo Team	1	2008–09

== Records ==
=== Career ===
At least 100 or more games played in the league

- Most points: 11563
  - (Finland) Lea Hakala
- Highest points per game average: 19.23
  - (Finland) Heli Roukanoja
- Most assists: 1179
  - (United States) Kenya Robinson
- Highest assists per game average: 3.26
  - (Finland) Reetta Piipari
- Most rebounds: 6578
  - (United States) Kenya Robinson
- Highest rebounds per game average: 12.46
  - (United States) Kenya Robinson
- Highest efficiency: 12294
  - (United States) Kenya Robinson
- Highest efficiency per game average: 31.15
  - (Hungary) Anna Hollos

=== Season ===
Has played in at least 50% of the season's games

- Most points: 911
  - (United States) Melissa Jeltema (Tapiolan Honka), 2012–13
- Highest points per game average: 26.47
  - (United States) Medina Turner (Äänekosken Huima), 1996–97
- Most assists: 172
  - (Finland) Reetta Piipari (Peli-Karhut), 2013–14
- Highest assists per game average: 6.15
  - (United States) Nikki Speed, (HoNsU), 2013–14
- Most rebounds: 575
  - (United States) Shauna Tubbs (Äänekosken Huima), 1997–98
- Highest rebounds per game average: 17.14
  - (United States) Sarah Zawodny (Forssan Alku), 2002–03
- Highest efficiency: 1290
  - (United States) Keisha Johnson (Tampereen Pyrintö), 1994–95
- Highest efficiency per game average: 36.95
  - (United States) Jennie Hall (Nokian Urheilijat), 1983–84

=== Match ===
- Most points: 53
  - (Finland) Nina Pajanti-Raudus (Forssan Alku), vs. Peli-Karhut (121–82), October 21, 1995
- Most assists: 16
  - (Finland) Erja Laaksonen (HNMKY), vs. Tapiolan Honka, (83–73), October 24, 1999
- Most rebounds: 32
  - (Jamaica) Oberon Pitterson (Tampereen Pyrintö), vs. Äänekosken Huima (78–58), October 12, 1996
- Highest efficiency: 67
  - (Jamaica) Oberon Pitterson (Tampereen Pyrintö), vs. Äänekosken Huima (78–58), October 12, 1996

All records include both regular season and playoffs. Updated as of season 2013–14
