= Joe Wright (basketball) =

Former basketballer

Personal information
- Born: April 1, 1963 (age 63) Carthage, Missouri
- Listed height: 192 cm (6 ft 4 in)

Career information
- High school: Carthage (Carthage, Missouri)
- College: State Fair CC (1982–1984); Kansas State (1984–1986)
- NBA draft: 1986: undrafted
- Position: Guard

Career history
- 1991–1992: Turun NMKY
- 1993: Breiðablik
- 1994: Grindavík
- 2002–2003: Lenadores Durango

Career highlights
- Korisliiga scoring champion (1992); Úrvalsdeild scoring champion (1993); Icelandic All-Star 1993

Joseph Eugene Wright (born April 1, 1963) is an American former professional basketball player. Wright holds the single season scoring record in the Úrvalsdeild karla when he averaged 46.6 points per game during the 1992–1993 season. In 1992 he set the single game scoring record in the Korisliiga when he scored 79 points.

== College career ==
Wright began his college basketball career with State Fair Community College before transferring to Kansas State University in 1984. On January 23, 1985, he made 11 of 11 field goals against Oklahoma State, setting a Big 8 Conference record. Wright was named Big 8 Player of the Week in both 1985 and 1986.

== Club career ==
Wright started his professional career in Austria in 1988. He played in Germany before signing with Turun NMKY in Finland in 1991.

=== Finland ===
Wright played Turun NMKY for one and a half season. In 1991–1992 he led the Korisliiga in scoring, averaging a league leading 44.1 points per game and finishing second in three point percent with 47,1%

On February 12, 1992, Wright set the Korisliiga single game scoring record when he scored 79 points against Pantterit.

=== Iceland ===
Wright joined Úrvalsdeild club Breiðablik in January 1993. In his first game, he scored 55 points in a 108–110 loss against Keflavík and followed it up by scoring 53 points against Haukar in his next game. On 29 January, Wright led Breiðablik to its second victory of the season by scoring 67 points against Njarðvík, the second highest single game scoring in the Úrvalsdeild karla history. In his first five games, he averaged 52.8 points per game. In February, he was selected for the Icelandic All-Star game. For the season he averaged a league leading 44.1 points per game but was unable to help Breiðablik stave off relegation.

In September 1994, Wright Joined Grindavík and played with them two games against M7 Basket in the FIBA Korać Cup. In the two games he scored 33 and 27 points.
