= 2024–25 Naisten Korisliiga =

Women's basketball league in Finland

Naisten Korisliiga
- Season: 2024–25
- Dates: Regular season: 2 October 2024 – 22 January 2025; Winners and losers stage: 29 January – 22 March 2025; Play Offs: 25 March – 29 April 2025
- Teams: 10

Regular season
- Season MVP: (United States) Carmen Tyson-Thomas

Finals
- Champions: Peli-Karhut (9th title)
- Runners-up: Torpan Pojat
- Finals MVP: (Finland) Anissa Pounds

Statistical leaders
Points	(United States) Carmen Tyson-Thomas	23.1
Rebounds	(United States) Carmen Tyson-Thomas	13.4
Assists	(Finland) Linda-Lotta Lehtoranta	7.2
Steals	(Finland) Erika Mace	3.4
Blocks	(Finland) Ninni Salmi	1.5

The 2024–25 Naisten Korisliiga is the 81th season of the top division women's basketball league in Finland since its establishment in 1944. It starts in October 2024 with the first round of the regular season and ends in April 2025.

Torpan Pojat are the defending champions.

Peli-Karhut won their ninth title after beating Torpan Pojat in the final.

== Format ==
In the first round, each team plays each other twice. The top five progress to the winners stage while the bottom five advance to the losers stage. In the winners stage, teams play each other twice and every team reaches the play offs. In the losers stage, teams play each other twice and the teams who finish in sixth, seventh and eighth place advance to the play offs. Every round in the playoffs is played as a best of five series.

== Regular season ==
Pos	Team	Pld	W	L	PF	PA	PD	Pts	Qualification
1	Torpan Pojat	18	17	1	1584	1256	+328	35	Winners stage
2	Peli-Karhut	18	15	3	1554	1203	+351	33	Winners stage
3	Kouvottaret	18	13	5	1518	1320	+198	31 (Note: Kouvottaret 175–172 Tapiolan Honka)	Winners stage
4	Tapiolan Honka	18	13	5	1500	1430	+70	31	Winners stage
5	Pyrintö	18	9	9	1407	1437	−30	27	Winners stage
6	Espoo Basket Team	18	8	10	1342	1313	+29	26	Losers stage
7	HBA-Märsky	18	6	12	1357	1483	−126	24	Losers stage
8	BC Nokia	18	4	14	1289	1395	−106	22 (Note: BC Nokia 161–127 Vimpelin Veto)	Losers stage
9	Vimpelin Veto	18	4	14	1270	1491	−221	22	Losers stage
10	Forssan Alku	18	1	17	1269	1762	−493	19	Losers stage

Source: Korisliiga
Rules for classification: 1) Points; 2) Points difference; 3) Points scored.

=== Winners stage ===
Pos	Team	Pld	W	L	PF	PA	PD	Pts	Qualification
1	Torpan Pojat	26	22	4	2191	1871	+320	48	Play Offs
2	Peli-Karhut	26	21	5	2198	1812	+386	47	Play Offs
3	Kouvottaret	26	19	7	2211	1965	+246	45	Play Offs
4	Tapiolan Honka	26	15	11	2151	2083	+68	41	Play Offs
5	Pyrintö	26	10	16	1992	2095	−103	36	Play Offs

Source: Korisliiga
Rules for classification: 1) Points; 2) Points difference; 3) Points scored.

=== Losers stage ===
Pos	Team	Pld	W	L	PF	PA	PD	Pts	Qualification
6	Espoo Basket Team	26	16	10	2053	1869	+184	42	Play Offs
7	HBA-Märsky	26	10	16	1951	2076	−125	36	Play Offs
8	BC Nokia	26	9	17	1885	1939	−54	35	Play Offs
9	Vimpelin Veto	26	6	20	1813	2099	−286	32	
10	Forssan Alku	26	2	24	1788	2424	−636	28	Relegation

Source: Korisliiga
Rules for classification: 1) Points; 2) Points difference; 3) Points scored.

== Play offs ==
Quarterfinals
1	Torpan Pojat	45	78	68	73	3
8	BC Nokia	85	60	66	68	1
4	Tapiolan Honka	91	86	94	3
5	Pyrintö	56	77	58	0
2	Peli-Karhut	90	87	88	3
7	HBA-Märsky	61	65	64	0
3	Kouvottaret	66	84	88	80	74	2
6	Espoo Basket Team	76	77	64	87	78	3

Semifinals
1	Torpan Pojat	93	94	70	3
4	Tapiolan Honka	86	68	53	0
2	Peli-Karhut	81	79	96	3
6	Espoo Basket Team	77	62	70	0

Final
1	Torpan Pojat	76	57	82	46	72	2
2	Peli-Karhut	73	74	65	72	86	3
Third place
3	Tapiolan Honka	46	0
6	Espoo Basket Team	78	1

Champions of Finland

Peli-Karhut
Ninth title
