= NMKY =

NMKY may refer to:

- NMKY is the Finnish abbreviation of YMCA
  - Lappeenrannan NMKY, a basketball club based in the city of Lappeenranta, Finland
  - NMKY Helsinki, a YMCA in Helsinki, Finland
  - "NMKY", a Finnish version of the song "Y.M.C.A."
