= Annika Holopainen =

Finnish basketball player

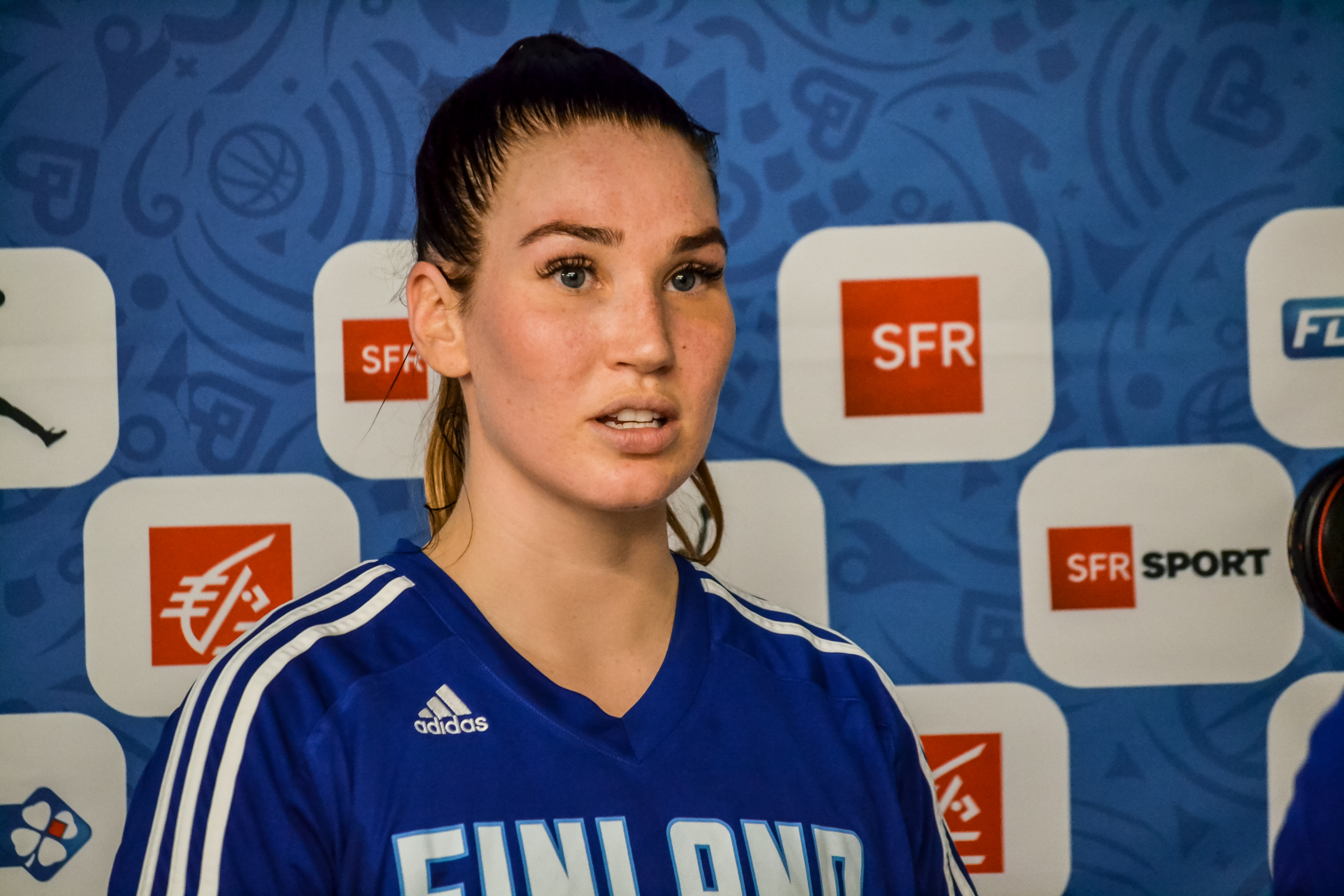

Personal information
- Born: 4 August 1993 (age 33)
- Listed height: 185 cm (6 ft 1 in)

Career information
- College: Portland (2012–2013); Old Dominion (2014–2017)
- Playing career: 2008–present
- Position: Forward
- Number: 14

Career history
- 2008–2012: Tapiolan Honka
- 2009–2012: Espoo Basket Team
- 2017–2018: TSV 1880 Wasserburg
- 2018–2019: AZS Politechnika Gdańsk
- 2019–2020: Châlons-Reims
- 2020–2021: KR
- 2021–2022: Montbrison Feminines BC
- 2022–2023: Araski AES
- 2023–present: Gisa Lions MBC

Career highlights
- Finnish Basketball Cup (2011); German Basketball Cup (2018); Naisten Korisliiga Sixth Man of the Year (2011); Naisten Korisliiga Newcomer of the Year (2011); Úrvalsdeild kvenna scoring leader (2021)

Annika Alexandra Holopainen (born 4 August 1993) is a Finnish professional basketball player and a member of the Finnish national team. She played college basketball for the University of Portland and later Old Dominion University. Following her college career, she has played professionally in Europe.

== Club career ==
Holopainen started her career with Tapiolan Honka in the second-tier Naisten I Divisioona. She later played for Espoo Basket Team with whom she won the Finnish Basketball Cup in 2011. The same year she was named the Naisten Korisliiga Sixth Man of the Year and the Newcomer of the Year.

During the 2017–2018 season she played for TSV 1880 Wasserburg in the Damen-Basketball-Bundesliga and the EuroCup. She helped the team win the German Basketball Cup in 2018. The following season, she became the first Finnish woman to play in the Polish Basket Liga Kobiet when she joined AZS Politechnika Gdańsk. For the season she averaged 7.8 points and 3.3 rebounds per game.

She played for Champagne Châlons-Reims Basket Féminin during the 2019–2020, averaging 8.9 in 18 games.

In August 2020, Holopainen signed with KR of the Icelandic Úrvalsdeild kvenna. In her first game, she scored 43 points in a loss against Keflavík. For the season she led the league in scoring with 25.9 points per game while also averaging 9.3 rebounds and 1.6 assists.

In June 2023, Holopainen signed with Gisa Lions MBC.

== Statistics ==
=== College statistics ===
Legend
GP	Games played	GS	Games started	MPG	Minutes per game
FG%	Field goal percentage	3P%	3-point field goal percentage	FT%	Free throw percentage
RPG	Rebounds per game	APG	Assists per game	SPG	Steals per game
BPG	Blocks per game	PPG	Points per game	**Bold**	Career high

Year	Team	GP	Points	FG%	3P%	FT%	RPG	APG	SPG	BPG	PPG
2012–13	Portland	31	**297**	41.5%	**36.1%**	69.6%	**3.3**	0.3	0.3	0.1	**9.6**
2013–14	Old Dominion	Did not play due to NCAA transfer rules									
2014–15	Old Dominion	29	86	30.8%	28.0%	57.1%	1.3	0.3	0.2	0.0	3.0
2015–16	Old Dominion	**34**	185	42.4%	20.0%	**74.2%**	2.1	0.5	**0.4**	**0.1**	5.4
2016–17	Old Dominion	29	174	**48.6%**	32.6%	**74.2%**	3.2	**0.6**	0.3	0.1	6.0
Career		123	742	41.5%	30.0%	70.5%	2.5	0.4	0.3	0.1	6.0
