= Torpan Pojat =

Finnish basketball club

- Leagues: I division A
- Founded: 1932; 94 years ago
- History: Torpan Pojat (1932–present)
- Arena: Töölö Sports Hall
- Location: Helsinki, Finland
- Championships: 9 Men's Finnish Championships; 4 Men's Finnish Cups
- Website: topo.fi

Torpan Pojat, shortened to ToPo, is a basketball club based in Helsinki, Finland. Torpan Pojat has their men's and women's team playing in national 1st division and many minor and junior teams in different age categories.

== History ==
Former logo of Torpan Pojat, which consisted of a star

The club was formed in 1932 as a sports club for a school in the neighbourhood of Munkkiniemi in Helsinki. Their men's team played for the first time in the predecessor of Korisliiga in 1956 and continued to play a total of 51 seasons in Korisliiga and seven seasons in lower divisions between 1956 and their dissolution in 2013. The women's team played in the highest tier for the first time in 1962, but never managed to establish itself in the league.

Torpan Pojat also played in international competitions. They got their first international match in the 1960–61 season of the FIBA Champion's Cup. The men's team played BC Sparta Prague in the first round, losing both legs (56–65, 47–68). They appeared in the competition also in 1966–67, 1981–82, 1983–84 and 1986–87. The men's team played twice in the Korać Cup (1988–89 and 1989–90) and four times in the Saporta Cup (1996–97, 1997–98, 1998–99 and 1999–00). Torpan Pojat made their record attendance of 9626 in the 1996–97 season of the cup in a game against CSK Samara. They also played once in the VTB United League (2011–12).

Former NBA players Dennis Rodman and Scottie Pippen have played for Torpan Pojat. Rodman played one game on 6 November 2005, against Espoon Honka. Rodman played 28 minutes, scored 17 points, and grabbed 6 rebounds. Fifteen of his 17 points were made behind the 3-point line, with a total of 13 attempts from beyond the arc. Pippen played two games in 2008. He played on 4 January 2008 against Porvoon Tarmo scoring 12 points, 7 rebounds, 4 assists and 3 steals in 23 minutes. On 5 January, against Honka, he had 9 points, 9 rebounds, 4 assists and 2 steals in 29 minutes.

Torpan Pojat was unable to acquire a license to play in Korisliiga for the 2012–2013 season, and were then relegated to a lower division. After the 2012–2013 season spent in a lower division, Torpan Pojat men's team was dissolved and their place in the second level of Finnish basketball, Division I A was transferred to the newly formed Helsinki Seagulls along with the remaining players.

== Honours ==
- Korisliiga
  - Winners (9): 1960, 1966, 1978, 1981, 1983, 1986, 1996, 1997, 1998
- Men's Finnish Cup
  - Winners (4): 1980, 1992, 1996, 1997

== Season by season ==
=== Men ===
- 1956 to 1972–73: Korisliiga
- 1973–74: Miesten I Divisioona (English: Men's First Division)
- 1974–75 to 1999–00: Korisliiga
- 2000–01: Miesten I Divisioona A (English: Men's First Division A)

Season	Domestic competitions				Finnish Cup	European competitions			Regional competitions		
Season	Tier	League	Pos.	Postseason	Finnish Cup	Tier	League	Result	League	Pos.	Postseason
2001–02	2	Divisioona I A	3	—N/a	—N/a	—N/a			—N/a		
2002–03	2	Divisioona I A	8	—N/a	—N/a	—N/a			—N/a		
2003–04	2	Divisioona I A	7	—N/a	—N/a	—N/a			—N/a		
2004–05	2	Divisioona I A	1	Promoted	—N/a	—N/a			—N/a		
2005–06	1	Korisliiga	6	QF	—N/a	—N/a			—N/a		
2006–07	1	Korisliiga	4	QF	—N/a	—N/a			—N/a		
2007–08	1	Korisliiga	2	SF	SF	—N/a			—N/a		
2008–09	1	Korisliiga	8	QF	Runner-up	—N/a			—N/a		
2009–10	1	Korisliiga	3	Runner-up	R16	—N/a			—N/a		
2010–11	1	Korisliiga	8	QF	Runner-up	—N/a			—N/a		
2011–12	1	Korisliiga	5	Third placed	QF	—N/a			VTB	1QR	
2012–13	2	Divisioona I A	2	SF	2RND	—N/a			—N/a		

- 51 seasons in Korisliiga
- 7 seasons in Miesten I Divisioona (English: Men's First Division)

=== Women ===
- 1962 to 1964–65: Naisten Korisliiga
- 1965–66: Naisten I Divisioona (English: Women's First Division)
- 1966–67: Naisten Korisliiga
- 1967–68 to 1970–71: Naisten I Divisioona (English: Women's First Division)
- 1971–72 to 1975–76: Naisten Korisliiga
- 1976–77: Naisten I Divisioona (English: Women's First Division)
- 1977–78: Naisten Korisliiga
- 1978–79 to 1996–97: Naisten I Divisioona (English: Women's First Division)
- 1997–98 to 1998–99: Naisten Korisliiga
- 1999–00 to 2004–05: Naisten I Divisioona (English: Women's First Division)

Season	Domestic competitions				Finnish Cup	European competitions			Regional competitions		
Season	Tier	League	Pos.	Postseason	Finnish Cup	Tier	League	Result	League	Pos.	Postseason
2005–06	1	Naisten Korisliiga	10	Relegated	—N/a	—N/a			—N/a		
2006–07	2	Naisten I Divisioona	2	—N/a	—N/a	—N/a			—N/a		
2007–08	2	Naisten I Divisioona	7	—N/a	—N/a	—N/a			—N/a		
2008–09	2	Naisten I Divisioona	10	—N/a	—N/a	—N/a			—N/a		
2009–10	2	Naisten I Divisioona	1	Promoted	QF	—N/a			—N/a		
2010–11	1	Naisten Korisliiga	4	SF	SF	—N/a			—N/a		
2011–12	1	Naisten Korisliiga	6	QF	QF	—N/a			—N/a		
2012–13	1	Naisten Korisliiga	4	QF	2RND	—N/a			—N/a		
2013–14	1	Naisten Korisliiga	3	Third placed	—N/a	—N/a			—N/a		

- 19 seasons in Naisten Korisliiga
- 33 seasons in Naisten I Divisioona (English: Women's First Division)

Updated as of season 2013–14

== Current roster ==
Note: Flags indicate national team eligibility at FIBA-sanctioned events. Players may hold other non-FIBA nationalities not displayed.

Torpan Pojat roster
Players
Coaches

Pos.	No.	Nat.	Name
PG	2	(Finland)	Miki Kuusisto
G/F	4	(United States)	L. D. Williams
G	8	(Finland)	Sami Marouf
G/F	10	(Finland)	Juuso Kauppinen
PG	11	(Finland)	Ilpo Pehkonen
F	13	(Finland)	Teo Niinimäki
F/C	15	(The Gambia)	Baboucarr Ceesay
F	16	(Finland)	Joel Jokinen
F/C	24	(United States)	Milton Jennings
F	34	(Finland)	Jonis Heikkinen
F	45	(Finland)	Alvar Michelsen
G	77	(Finland)	Tuomo Antikainen

Head coach

(Finland) Pekka Konttinen

Assistant coach(es)

(Finland) Markus Rautala

Legend

- (C) Team captain
- Injured

- Roster
Updated: 29 September 2017

== Notable players ==
Note: Flags indicate national team eligibility at FIBA-sanctioned events. Players may hold other non-FIBA nationalities not displayed.

Criteria

To appear in this section a player must have either:

- Set a club record or won an individual award while at the club
- Played at least one official international match for their national team at any time
- Played at least one official NBA match at any time.

- (Finland) Samuel Haanpää
- (Finland) Shawn Huff
- (Finland) Mikko Koivisto
- (Finland) Pekka Markkanen
- (Finland) Kimmo Muurinen
- (United States) Scottie Pippen
- (United States) Dennis Rodman
- (Finland) Hanno Möttölä
- (Finland) Kari Hautala
- (Finland) Eldar Skamo
