= Espoon Honka =

- Founded: 1971
- Dissolved: 2011
- History: Honka Playboys (1971–1975); Playhonka (1976–1983); Playhonka Scotch Team (1983–1985); Espoon Honka (1985–2011); Tapiolan Honka (2011–present)
- Arena: Tapiolan Urheiluhalli
- Capacity: 1,570
- Location: Espoo, Finland
- Championships: 8 Finnish Leagues; 6 Finnish Cups
Home	Away

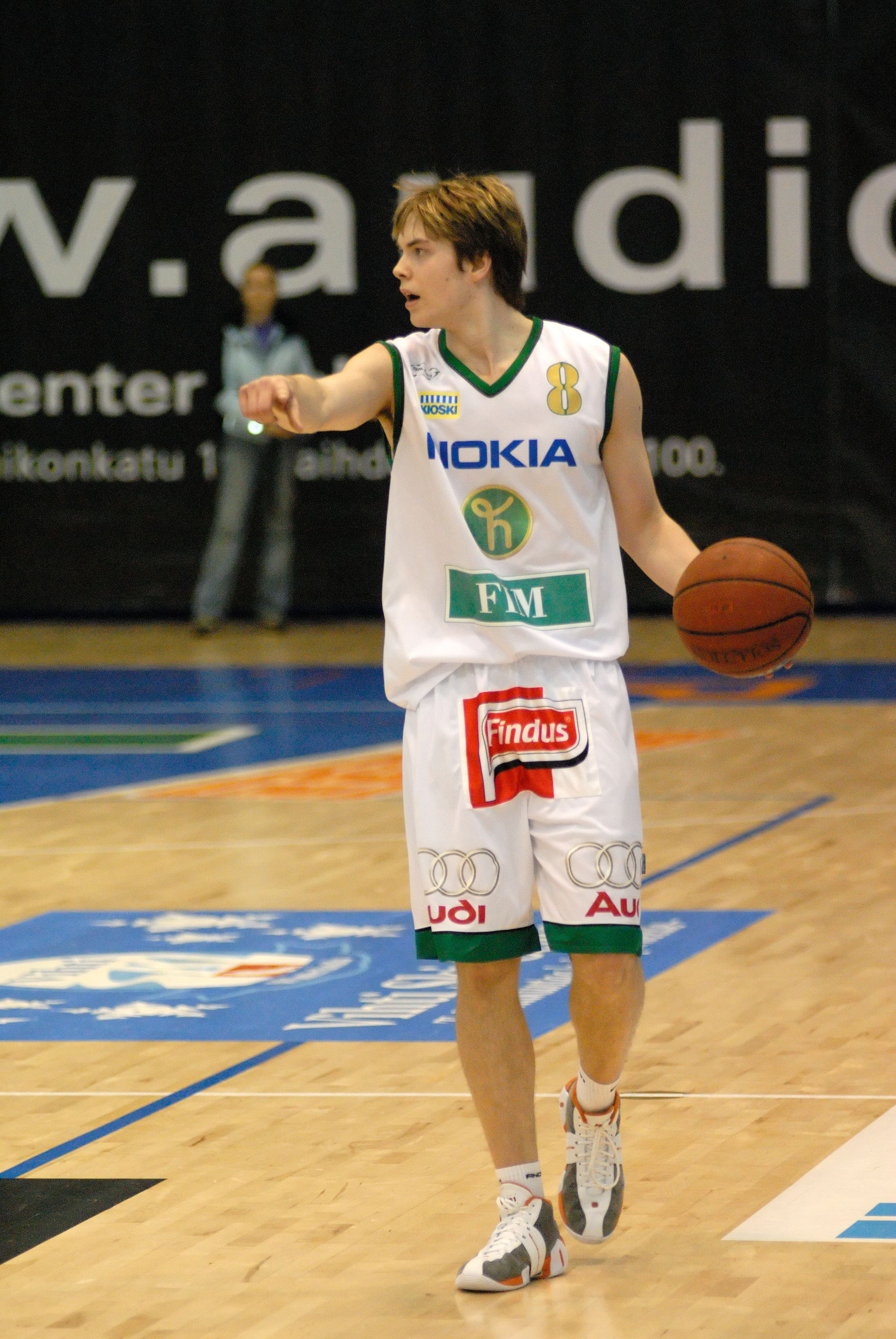
Petteri Koponen with Espoon Honka in 2007

Espoon Honka, also known as Honka Playboys and Playhonka, was a professional basketball club that was based in Espoo, Finland. It played in Finland's top-tier level basketball league, the Korisliiga. The club was dissolved in 2011, due to financial difficulties.

== History ==
Espoon Honka was originally founded in 1971 as Honka Playboys. In 1976, it became known as Playhonka, the senior men's basketball section of the Finnish club Tapiolan Honka, which from then on worked as a feeder team for Espoon Honka, and also took responsibility for organizing the club's youth teams and other activities. Espoon Honka played a total of 16 seasons in the top-tier level Finnish Korisliiga, and won eight league championship titles. The club also won a total of six Finnish Cup titles.

Espoon Honka didn't play in the 2011–12 season of the Korisliiga, due to financial problems. The whole team was then dissolved later that year. The senior men's team was then once again organized by Tapiolan Honka.

== Honours ==
- Korisliiga
  - Champions (8): 1974, 1976, 1979, 2001, 2002, 2003, 2007, 2008
- Finnish Cup
  - Winners (6): 1973, 1974, 1975, 1977, 2001, 2009

== Notable players ==
Note: Flags indicate national team eligibility at FIBA-sanctioned events. Players may hold other non-FIBA nationalities not displayed.

Criteria

To appear in this section a player must have either:

- Set a club record or won an individual award while at the club
- Played at least one official international match for their national team at any time
- Played at least one official NBA match at any time.

- (Canada) Ryan Bell
- (Federal Republic of Yugoslavia) Luka Pavićević
- (Finland) Shawn Huff
- (Finland) Petteri Koponen
- (Finland) Tuukka Kotti
- (Finland) Kimmo Muurinen
- (Finland) Sasu Salin
- (Finland) Aki Ulander
- (Finland) Jamar Wilson

== Head coaches ==
- (Canada) Gordon Herbert
- (Montenegro) Mihailo Pavićević
