= Koripallon I-divisioona =

Second tier of men's basketball in Finland

- Current season, competition or edition: 2023-24 Koripallon I-divisioona season
- Sport: Basketball
- No. of teams: 12
- Country: Finland
- Promotion to: Korisliiga

The Koripallon I-divisioona is the second tier professional basketball league in Finland. The teams play playoffs for promotion to the Korisliiga.

== Current clubs (2023–24) ==
Team	City, Province
HBA-Märsky	Helsinki
Kipinä Basket	Äänekoski
JBA Academy	Jyväskylä
Lahti Basketball	Lahti
Torpan Pojat	Helsinki
Lappeenrannan NMKY	Lappeenranta
Raiders Basket	Järvenpää
Äänekosken Huima	Äänekoski
Pyrinto Akatemia A	Tampere
Raholan Pyrkivä	Tampere
NMKY Helsinki	Helsinki
Oulun Basketball	Oulu
