= Finnish Basketball Cup =

Finnish basketball competition

- Sport: Basketball
- Founded: 1968
- Country: Finland
- Continent: (European Union) Europe
- Most recent champion: Helsinki Seagulls (4th title) (2024)
- Most titles: KTP-Basket (9 titles)
- Broadcaster: Elisa Viihde
- Related competitions: Korisliiga
- Website: Miesten Suomen cup

The Finnish Basketball Cup (Finnish: Koripallon Suomen Cup) is the highest level national domestic basketball cup competition of Finland. It is the second most important basketball competition in the country, after the top-tier level Finnish national domestic league, the Korisliiga. From 2014 to 2018, the competition was not contested.

== Finals ==
Year	Winner	Runners-up	Score
2024	Helsinki Seagulls (4)	BC Nokia	83–76
2023	Joensuun Kataja (4)	Helsinki Seagulls	86–84
2022	Helsinki Seagulls (3)	Salon Vilpas	104–94
2021	Helsinki Seagulls (2)	Tampereen Pyrintö	97–95
2020	Helsinki Seagulls	Tampereen Pyrintö	94–93
2019	Salon Vilpas	Tampereen Pyrintö	106–93
2014–2018	Inactive		
2013 (Note: In the 2012–13 season, instead of the normal cup competition, the Finnish "League Cup" was played, which was contested between the top four placed teams of the halfway point of the Korisliiga season.)	Tampereen Pyrintö (2)	Loimaan Korikonkarit	78–73
2012	Joensuun Kataja (3)	Tampereen Pyrintö	78–68
2011	Joensuun Kataja (2)	Torpan Pojat	95–88
2009	Espoon Honka (6)	Tampereen Pyrintö	101–83
2008	Lappeenrannan NMKY (4)	Torpan Pojat, Helsinki	98-83
2007	Lappeenrannan NMKY (3)	Kouvot, Kouvola	74-56
2006	Lappeenrannan NMKY (2)	Espoon Honka	78-70
2005	Lappeenrannan NMKY	Joensuun Kataja	88-58
2004	Kotkan TP (9)	Namika Lahti	104-96
2003	Kotkan TP (8)	Kouvot	88-65
2002	Joensuun Kataja	Salon Vilpas	102-76
2001	Espoon Honka (5)	Kouvolan Kouvot	83-73
2000	Namika Lahti (3)	Pyrbasket, Tampere	96-75
1999	Turun Piiloset (4)	Espoon Honka	105-94
1998	Kouvot	Torpan Pojat	57-50
1997	Torpan Pojat (4)	Kouvot	71-67
1996	Torpan Pojat (3)	Espoon Honka	81-77
1995	Pantterit, Helsinki (3)	Uudenkaupungin Korihait	89-88
1994	Namika Lahti (2)	Kotkan TP	90-89
1993	Kotkan TP (7)	Forssan Koripojat	89-84
1992	Torpan Pojat (2)	Kotkan TP	92-81
1991	Pantterit (2)	Torpan Pojat	85-60
1990	Kotkan TP (6)	Namika Lahti	78-72
1989	Namika Lahti	Helsingin NMKY	74-73
1988	Uudenkaupungin Urheilijat (2)	Kotkan TP	171-169 (98-85, 73–84)
1987	Kotkan TP (5)	Uudenkaupungin Urheilijat	169-168 (96-83, 73–85)
1986	Uudenkaupungin Urheilijat	Kotkan TP	180-176 (83-96, 97–80)
1985	Kotkan TP (4)	Helsingin NMKY	78-65
1984	Kotkan TP (3)	Pantterit	144–129 (78–80, 66–49)
1983	Kotkan TP (2)	Pantterit	162–148 (82–72, 80–76)
1982	Turun NMKY (3)	Helsingin NMKY	201–175 (110–97, 91–78)
1981	Pantterit	Turun NMKY	193–183 (94–94, 97–87)
1980	Torpan Pojat		
1979	Peli-Karhut Kotka		
1978	Kotkan TP		
1977	Playhonka (4)		
1976	Turun NMKY (2)		
1975	Honka Playboys (3)		
1974	Honka Playboys (2)		
1973	Honka Playboys		
1972	Turun NMKY		
1971	Tapion Honka (2)		
1970	Helsingin Kisa-Toverit		
1969	Tampereen Pyrintö		
1968	Tapion Honka		

== Performance by club ==
Rank	Club	Titles	Runner-up	Champion Years
1	Kotkan TP	9	4	1978, 1983, 1984, 1985, 1987, 1990, 1993, 2003, 2004
2	Espoon Honka	6	3	1973, 1974, 1975, 1977, 2001, 2009
3	Torpan Pojat	4	4	1980, 1992, 1996, 1997
4	Turun Piiloset	4	1	1972, 1976, 1982, 1999
4	Joensuun Kataja	4	1	2002, 2011, 2012, 2023
4	Helsinki Seagulls	4	1	2020, 2021, 2022, 2024
7	Lappeenrannan NMKY	4	0	2005, 2006, 2007, 2008
8	Pantterit	3	2	1981, 1991, 1995
9	Namika Lahti	3	1	1989, 1994, 2000
10	Tampereen Pyrintö	2	5	1969, 2013
11	Uudenkaupungin Urheilijat	2	2	1986, 1988
12	Tapion Honka	2	0	1968, 1971
13	Kouvot	1	4	1998
14	Salon Vilpas	1	2	2019
15	Helsingin NMKY	0	4	
16	Forssan Koripojat	0	1	
16	Loimaan Korikonkarit	0	1	
16	BC Nokia	0	1	

== See also ==
- Korisliiga
