= Helsingin Kisa-Toverit =

Helsingin Kisa-Toverit (HKT) is a sports club founded in 1929 and based in Finland's capital city of Helsinki. The club have many departments and the strongest have been in basketball, track sports and field games.

== Basketball ==
=== Men ===
The basketball HKT has been played in the national basketball league for 26 seasons, during which it won 504 to 300 match. The club has won five championships in Finland in the period from 1961 to 1965, five silver and two bronze medals. Also the men's basketball department of HKT has won the 1969-70 national Cup. In European competitions HKT advanced to the quarterfinals of the 1963–64 FIBA European Champions Cup where the team eliminated by the Italian powerhouse Simmenthal Milano. In the 1964–65 FIBA European Champions Cup HKT faced in the round of 16 the famous Real Madrid and played a great home match where the Finnish lost with a 100-109 score.

The national team of Finland that took part in the basketball tournament of 1964 Olympic Games in Tokyo had constituted five players of Helsingin Kisa-Toverit (Martti Liimo, Kari Liimo, Raimo Vartia, Pertti Laanti and Teijo Finneman).

=== Women ===
Women's basketball section of HKT has played four seasons in the first division (Naisten Korisliiga). In 1967, the club's women's team won the only Finnish Championship. In 1966 HKT's women won their first championship medal, as naisjoukkue reached the Championship bronze medal.

=== Honours ===
Men

Finnish League

- Winners (5): 1960–61, 1961–62, 1962–63, 1963–64, 1964–65

Finnish Cup

- Winners (1): 1969–70

Women

Finnish League

- Winners (1): 1966–67

== Baseball ==
Baseball Helsingin Kisa-Toverit won two TUL's championships, in 1932 and 1935. Socially turned in one of his fastest baseball players of which, Alpo Savolainen, and Ensio Vuorinen.
