= Tapiolan Honka =

Finnish basketball team

- Leagues: Korisliiga; Naisten Korisliiga
- Founded: 1957
- History: Tapion Honka (1957–1975); Tapiolan Honka (1975–1976); Espoon Honka (1976–2011); Tapiolan Honka (2011–present)
- Arena: Tapiolan Urheiluhalli
- Capacity: 1,570
- Location: Espoo, Finland
- Team colors: White, Green
- Championships: 5 Finnish Championships; 2 Finnish Cups
- Website: www.tapiolanhonka.fi

Tapiolan Honka is a professional basketball club that is based in Tapiola, Espoo, Finland. The club's senior men's team plays in the Finland's top-tier level league, the Korisliiga.

== History ==
It was founded as a sports club named Tapion Honka in 1957. The senior men's basketball section separated from the rest of the sports club in 1975, and took the name of Tapiolan Honka. In 1976, Tapiolan Honka and Honka Playboys merged, under the name of Playhonka. So, from 1976 onwards, the men's senior first team was known as Playhonka.

After that, Tapiolan Honka operated as a feeder team for Playhonka, and also oversaw the club's youth team sections. Playhonka would eventually become known as Espoon Honka in 1985. The Espoon Honka club was ultimately dissolved in 2011, and the senior men's team was reestablished, under the original name of Tapiolan Honka, and retaining the Tapiolan Honka club's history.

The team was promoted up to the Finnish top-tier level competition, the Korisliiga, from the Finnish second-tier level competition, the I division A, in 2024.

== Senior women's team ==
The club's senior women's team plays in the top-tier level women's competition in Finland, the Naisten Korisliiga.

== Youth sections ==
The club has a total of about 700 licensed players, and over 1,200 total members, in all of the different age categories.

== Honours ==
- Finnish Championship
  - Champions (5):
  - 1968, 1969, 1970, 1971, 1972
- Finnish Cup
  - Winners (2): 1968, 1971

== Notable players ==
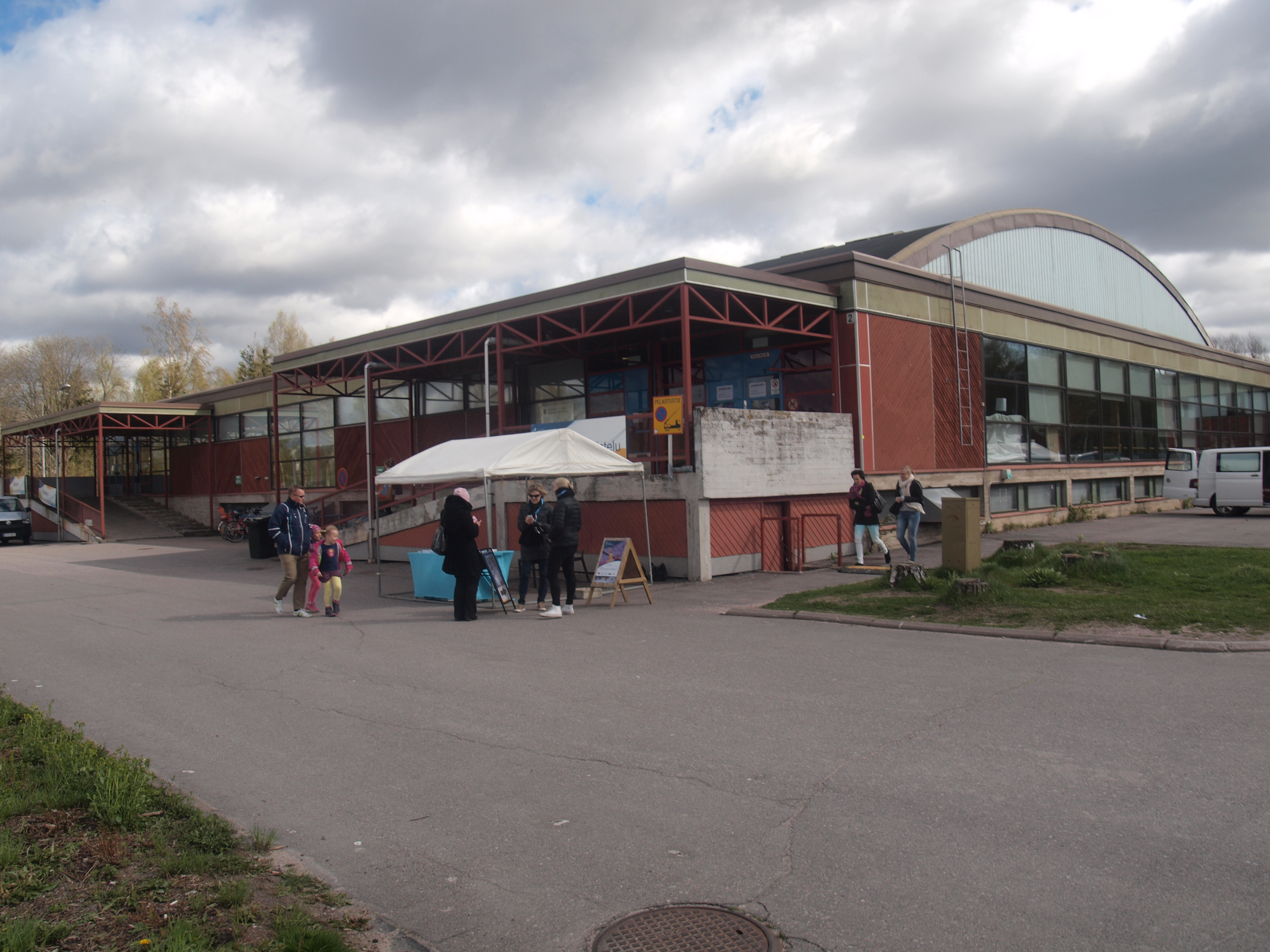
Tapiola sports hall

- (Finland) Seppo Kuusela
- (Finland) Uolevi Manninen
- (Finland) Anton Odabasi
- (Finland) Kimmo Muurinen
- (Finland) Tuukka Kotti
- (Finland) Carl Lindbom
- (Finland) Annika Holopainen
- (Iceland) (United States) Brenton Birmingham
- (United States) Lele Hardy
- (United States) Kiana Johnson
- (United States) Haiden Palmer
