= Pussihukat =

- Leagues: First Division
- Founded: 1975
- Stadium: Energia Areena
- Capacity: 3,500
- Location: Vantaa, Finland
- Team colors

Pussihukat is a basketball club in Finland, based in Vantaa. The club's got over 400 members, it includes men's, women's, juniors, and special needs teams. The women's team has won the Finnish championship twice, and the men's team has won silver and bronze medals during the 2000s. Pussihukat is playing in the Energia Areena, since it moved into the brand new stadium in January 2007. The men's team currently plays in the "First Division", the second division of Finland.
