= Pantterit =

- Leagues: Men: Division III
- Founded: 1938
- History: Kiri-Veikot (1938-1949); HOK-Veikot (1949-1953); Pantterit (1953-present)
- Location: Helsinki, Finland
- Team colors
- Championships: Men: 14 Korisliiga titles 3 Suomen Cup titles Women: 5 Naisten Korisliiga titles
- Website: http://www.pantterit.com

Pantterit (English: Panthers) is a professional basketball club from Helsinki, Finland. The club was formed in 1938 and it has won the men's Finnish championship title for 14 times making it the most successful team in Finnish basketball history. Pantterit also has 5 women's Finnish championship titles.

== History ==
=== Men ===
The club was formed in 1938 and were originally named Kiri-Veikot. Pantterit played in the very first season of Finnish championship in basketball in 1939. The club took its first championship title in 1944 and became the club to beat in two following decades. Pantterit became the first Finnish team to participate in international basketball competitions, as they played against polish Legia Warsaw in the 1958 season of Champions Cup. Pantterit beat Legia on the first leg (64-62), but lost the second leg (67-71) and were eliminated by aggregate score. In the 1959–60 season Pantterit beat their first round opponents HSG Wissenschaft HU from East Germany, but were relegated in the next round against KS Polonia from Poland.

Pantterit found their success again in early 1980s as they first won the championship in 1980 and took the cup next year. The victories made Pantterit eligible for international competitions and they did participate in the Cup Winner's Cup in 1982–83 season. They were relegated in the first round when they lost to Swedish Solna IK.

Pantterit won their next title in 1991 when they took the Suomen Cup, the yearly national cup competition. They participated in the 1992–93 season of the European Cup, beating Tinex Norik Medvode from Slovenia in the first round. Swizz Pully Basket ended the team's cup journey on the second round. Pantterit also won the 1995 Suomen Cup but did not take part in international competitions.

Pantterit struggled for their spot in the premier basketball league, Korisliiga and were relegated to Division I in 2000–01 season. After six seasons Pantterit were again relegated to a lower division in the 2007–08 season as well.

In the 2014–15 season, the men's team are playing in Division III, the fourth highest tier of Finnish basketball.

==== 103-point game ====
On March 21, 2026, 18-year old Nantii Ruuhilahti scored 103 points against BC Nokia. The performance occurred in the Under-19 Finnish Basketball Championship league, breaking the Finnish basketball record for most points in a single game. He also recorded eight rebounds, five steals, and two assists in Pantterit's 186–77 win.

=== Women ===
Pantterit women's team rose to the women's premier league, Naisten Korisliiga again for the 1998–99 season, for the first time after their last visit in the 1970–71 season. Pantterit had a strong team and gained instant success and won their first ever Korisliiga title in the 1999–00 season. Pantterit reclaimed their title in 2001 and 2002. They also won the championship in 2004 and 2006. The team were unfortunately dissolved after the 2006 championship win due lack of financial resources. They also gave up their place in the women's Baltic Basketball League.

== Honours ==
=== Men ===
- Finnish Championship titles: 14
  - 1944, 1945, 1948, 1949, 1950, 1951, 1952, 1953, 1954, 1955, 1956, 1957, 1959, 1980
- Finnish Cup titles: 3
  - 1981, 1991, 1995

=== Women ===
- Finnish Championship titles: 5
  - 2000, 2001, 2002, 2004, 2006

== Club structure ==
Pantterit men's first team are currently playing Division III, a fourth tier basketball league in Finland. Pantterit women's first team is currently inactive.

Pantterit also has youth teams: 6 boys' teams and 5 girls' teams. Each team has a number of different sections for different neighborhoods. Pantterit youth teams generally come from eastern Helsinki.
