= Korisliiga =

Top-tier men's professional basketball league in Finland

- Formerly: Koripallon SM-sarja; 1939–1999; SM-koris; 1999–2004; Sparliiga; 2004–2005
- Founded: 1939
- Country: Finland
- Federation: Basketball Finland
- Confederation: FIBA Europe
- Number of teams: 12
- Level on pyramid: 1
- Relegation to: I-division A
- International cup(s): Champions League; FIBA Europe Cup
- Current champions: Salon Vilpas (2025–26)
- Most championships: Pantterit (14 titles)
- TV partners: Ruutu+; Yle TV2; VeikkausTV
- Website: korisliiga.fi
- 2025–26 Korisliiga season

Korisliiga is the top-tier professional basketball league in Finland, comprising the top-twelve teams of the country. Pantterit hold the record for the most league titles won, with fourteen. Salon Vilpas are the reigning Finnish Champions (SM) after winning the playoff finals versus Joensuun Kataja in 2026.

The league was founded by Basketball Finland in 1939 as Koripallon SM-sarja (lit. 'Basketball Finnish Championship' or 'Basketball Finnish Championship series'). (Note: Koripallo is the Finnish term for basketball, from kori meaning 'basket' and pallo meaning 'ball.' The abbreviation 'SM-sarja' is the shortened form of Suomen mestaruussarja, meaning 'Finnish championship' or 'Finnish championship series.' See Finnish Champion for more.) It was renamed SM-koris ('Finnish Champion[ship] Basket') in 1999 and was known as Sparliiga during the 2004–05 season due to a sponsorship agreement with Spar. The current league name, Korisliiga ('Basket League'), has been used since 2005.

== Season format ==
In its current format, each team plays all other teams two times in the regular season, once at home and once away, for a total of 22 regular season games. The top six teams advances continues to upper stage and the bottom six teams plays lower stage after 22 games, 5 games at home and 5 games at away versus all other teams in stage. The best two teams from lower group joins to playoffs with upper group teams.

Playoffs are played best of seven format, except the quarter-finals which are played best of 5 format.

== Teams ==
The official Korisliiga logo used until the 2015–16 season

=== Current teams ===
Team	City	Home arena	Founded	Head coach
Helsinki Seagulls	Helsinki	Töölön kisahalli	2013	Timo Saukkola
Joensuun Kataja	Joensuu	Motonet Areena	1949	Petri Virtanen
Kauhajoen Karhu	Kauhajoki	IKH Areena	1910	Janne Koskimies
Kobrat	Lapua	Kobra-Areena	1989	Ville Turja
Korihait	Uusikaupunki	Uusikaupunki Areena	1974	Ivan Ivanovic
Kouvot	Kouvola	MLL Areena	1964	Kari Kurronen
KTP-Basket	Kotka	Steveco Areena	1927	Darko Mihajlovic
BC Nokia	Nokia	Harjuniityn palloiluhalli	1997	Greg Gibson
Salon Vilpas	Salo	Salohalli	1908	Jussi Savolainen
Tampereen Pyrintö	Tampere	Pyynikin palloiluhalli	1896	Tero Vasell
Bisons Loimaa	Loimaa	Loimaan liikuntahalli	1964	Konsta Mastomäki
Tapiolan Honka	Espoo	Tapiolan Urheiluhalli	1957	Aapo Heinonen

=== From 2000s, Korisliiga in timeline ===
2000– 2001	2001– 2002	2002– 2003	2003– 2004	2004– 2005	2005– 2006	2006– 2007	2007– 2008	2008– 2009	2009– 2010	2010– 2011	2011– 2012	2012– 2013	2013– 2014	2014– 2015	2015– 2016
Pyrbasket					Pyrintö										
KTP
Kouvot
	Kataja														
Namika Lahti															
Vilpas															
Korihait															
							Karhu								
LrNMKY													N. Lpr		
Espoon Honka															
													Tapiolan Honka		
		Tarmo													
											LoKoKo				
					ToPo										
														Seagulls	
												Kobrat			
	FoKoPo														
T. Comp.															
Pussihukat															
				Aura Basket											
Huima															
	BC Jyväskylä														
BC Nokia															
SäyRi															
Pantterit															

== Title holders ==
- 1938–39 Ylioppilaskoripalloilijat
- 1939–40 Eiran Kisa-Veikot
- 1940–41 Kadettikoulu
- 1941–43 Not held due to WWII
- 1943–44 Kiri-Veikot
- 1944–45 Kiri-Veikot
- 1945–46 NMKY Helsinki
- 1946–47 NMKY Helsinki
- 1947–48 Kiri-Veikot
- 1948–49 HOK-Veikot
- 1949–50 HOK-Veikot
- 1950–51 HOK-Veikot
- 1951–52 HOK-Veikot
- 1952–53 Pantterit
- 1953–54 Pantterit
- 1954–55 Pantterit
- 1955–56 Pantterit
- 1956–57 Pantterit
- 1957–58 KTP
- 1958–59 Pantterit
- 1959–60 Torpan Pojat
- 1960–61 Helsingin Kisa-Toverit
- 1961–62 Helsingin Kisa-Toverit
- 1962–63 Helsingin Kisa-Toverit
- 1963–64 Helsingin Kisa-Toverit
- 1964–65 Helsingin Kisa-Toverit
- 1965–66 Torpan Pojat
- 1966–67 KTP
- 1967–68 Tapion Honka
- 1968–69 Tapion Honka
- 1969–70 Tapion Honka
- 1970–71 Tapion Honka
- 1971–72 Tapion Honka
- 1972–73 Turun NMKY
- 1973–74 Honka Playboys
- 1974–75 Turun NMKY
- 1975–76 Honka Playboys
- 1976–77 Turun NMKY
- 1977–78 Torpan Pojat
- 1978–79 Playhonka
- 1979–80 Pantterit
- 1980–81 Torpan Pojat
- 1981–82 Turun NMKY
- 1982–83 Torpan Pojat
- 1983–84 NMKY Helsinki
- 1984–85 NMKY Helsinki
- 1985–86 Torpan Pojat
- 1986–87 NMKY Helsinki
- 1987–88 KTP
- 1988–89 NMKY Helsinki
- 1989–90 Uudenkaupungin Urheilijat
- 1990–91 KTP
- 1991–92 NMKY Helsinki
- 1992–93 KTP
- 1993–94 KTP
- 1994–95 Kouvot
- 1995–96 Torpan Pojat
- 1996–97 Torpan Pojat
- 1997–98 Torpan Pojat
- 1998–99 Kouvot
- 1999-00 Namika Lahti
- 2000–01 Espoon Honka
- 2001–02 Espoon Honka
- 2002–03 Espoon Honka
- 2003–04 Kouvot
- 2004–05 Lappeenrannan NMKY
- 2005–06 Lappeenrannan NMKY
- 2006–07 Espoon Honka
- 2007–08 Espoon Honka
- 2008–09 Namika Lahti
- 2009–10 Tampereen Pyrintö
- 2010–11 Tampereen Pyrintö
- 2011–12 Bisons Loimaa (Nilan)
- 2012–13 Bisons Loimaa (Nilan)
- 2013–14 Tampereen Pyrintö
- 2014–15 Kataja
- 2015–16 Kouvot
- 2016–17 Kataja
- 2017–18 Kauhajoki Karhu
- 2018–19 Kauhajoki Karhu
- 2019–20 None
- 2020–21 Salon Vilpas
- 2021–22 Kauhajoki Karhu
- 2022–23 Helsinki Seagulls
- 2023–24 BC Nokia
- 2024–25 Helsinki Seagulls
- 2025–26 Salon Vilpas

== Finals ==
Season	Champion	Runner-up	Finals score	Bronze medal
1980–81	Torpan Pojat	Tampereen Pyrintö	3–0	Hyvinkään Tahko
1981–82	Turun NMKY	Pantterit	3–2	KTP Basket
1982–83	Torpan Pojat	Pantterit	3–2	Turun NMKY
1983–84	Helsingin NMKY	Tapiolan Honka	3–0	KTP Basket
1984–85	Helsingin NMKY	KTP Basket	3–1	UU
1985–86	Torpan Pojat	KTP Basket	3–1	Helsingin NMKY
1986–87	Helsingin NMKY	KTP Basket	3–0	UU
1987–88	KTP Basket	Helsingin NMKY	3–2	Torpan Pojat
1988–89	Helsingin NMKY	HoNsU	3–2	Pantterit
1989–90	UU	KTP Basket	3–1	Helsingin NMKY
1990–91	KTP Basket	HoNsU	3–2	Torpan Pojat
1991–92	Helsingin NMKY	Pantterit	4–2	UU
1992–93	KTP Basket	Torpan Pojat	3–0	HoNsU
1993–94	KTP Basket	Torpan Pojat	3–2	Forssan Koripojat
1994–95	Kouvot	Korihait	3–1	Torpan Pojat
1995–96	Torpan Pojat	Namika Lahti		Espoon Honka
1996–97	Torpan Pojat	Kouvot		Espoon Honka
1997–98	Torpan Pojat	Kouvot		Espoon Honka
1998–99	Kouvot	Espoon Honka	3–1	Turun NMKY
1999–00	Namika Lahti	Torpan Pojat	3–2	Espoon Honka
2000–01	Espoon Honka	Tampereen Pyrintö	3–0	Namika Lahti
2001–02	Espoon Honka	Namika Lahti	3–2	Kataja
2002–03	Espoon Honka	Kataja	3–1	Pussihukat
2003–04	Kouvot	Namika Lahti	3–1	KTP Basket
2004–05	Lappeenrannan NMKY	Pussihukat	3–2	Kataja
2005–06	Lappeenrannan NMKY	Kataja	3–2	Espoon Honka
2006–07	Espoon Honka	Namika Lahti	3–0	Kataja
2007–08	Espoon Honka	Kouvot	3–1	Lappeenrannan NMKY
2008–09	Namika Lahti	Kataja	3–0	Tampereen Pyrintö
2009–10	Tampereen Pyrintö	Torpan Pojat	3–2	Kouvot
2010–11	Tampereen Pyrintö	Kataja	3–2	KTP Basket
2011–12	Bisons Loimaa	Kataja	3–1	Torpan Pojat
2012–13	Bisons Loimaa	KTP Basket	3–2	Kataja
2013–14	Tampereen Pyrintö	Kataja	3–1	Bisons Loimaa
2014–15	Kataja	Bisons Loimaa	3–2	KTP
2015–16	Kouvot	Tampereen Pyrintö	4–1	BC Nokia
2016–17	Kataja	Salon Vilpas	4–2	Helsinki Seagulls
2017–18	Kauhajoki Karhu	Salon Vilpas	4–2	Helsinki Seagulls
2018–19	Kauhajoki Karhu	Kouvot	4–1	KTP
2019–20	Not awarded due to the COVID-19 pandemic			
2020–21	Salon Vilpas	Kauhajoki Karhu	4–2	Helsinki Seagulls
2021–22	Kauhajoki Karhu	Salon Vilpas	3–1	Helsinki Seagulls
2022–23	Helsinki Seagulls	Kauhajoki Karhu	4–2	Kataja Basket
2023–24	BC Nokia	Helsinki Seagulls	4–3	Kauhajoki Karhu
2024–25	Helsinki Seagulls	Kauhajoki Karhu	4–0	Salon Vilpas
2025–26	Salon Vilpas	Kataja BC	4–3	Helsinki Seagulls

== Performance by club ==
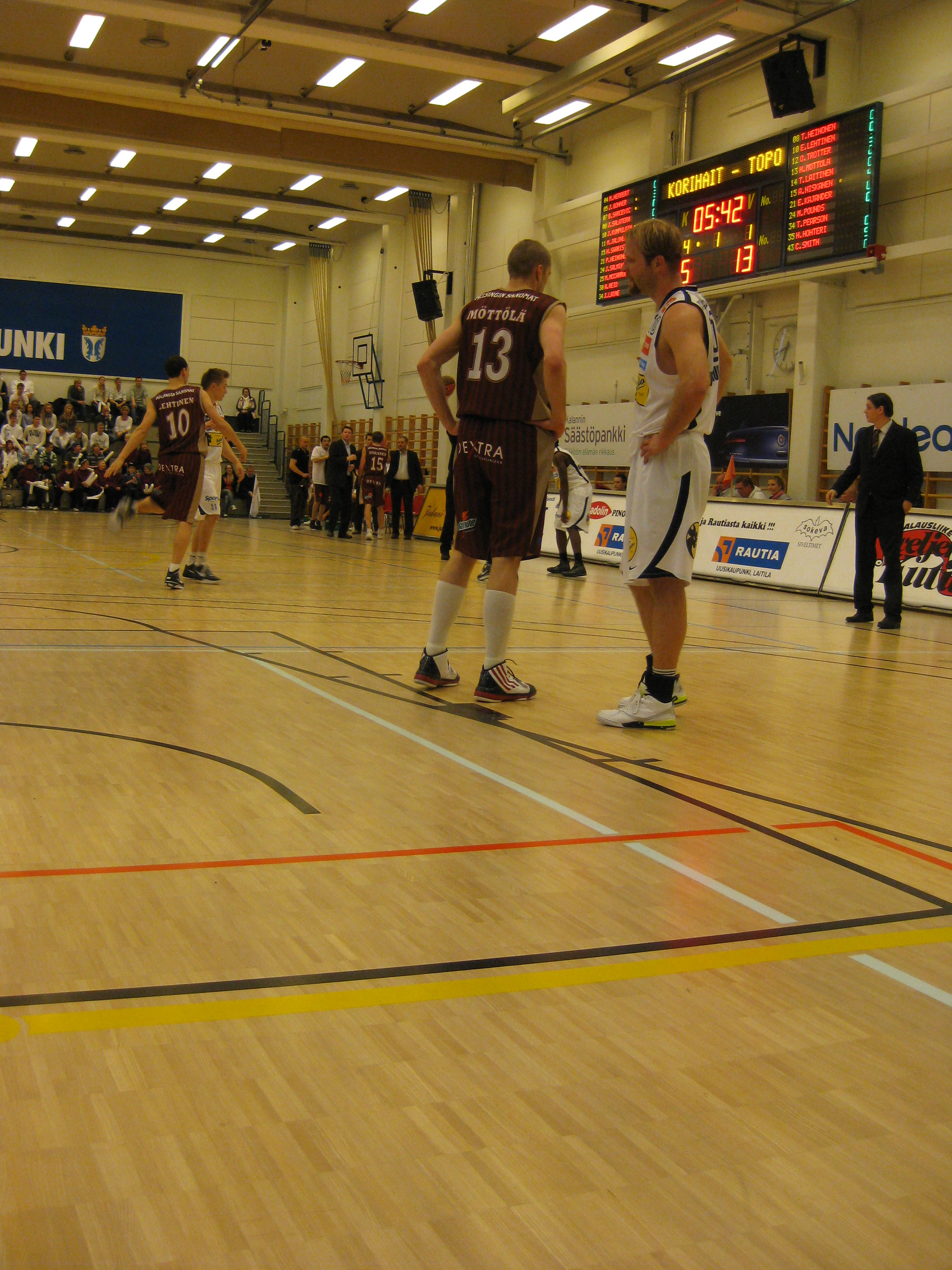
Korihait against Topo in 2010

Teams shown in italics are no longer in existence.

Korisliiga winners by club
Club	Wins	Seasons won
Pantterit	14	1944, 1945, 1948, 1949, 1950, 1951, 1952, 1953, 1954, 1955, 1956, 1957, 1959, 1980
Torpan Pojat	9	1960, 1966, 1978, 1981, 1983, 1986, 1996, 1997, 1998
Espoon Honka	8	1974, 1976, 1979, 2001, 2002, 2003, 2007, 2008
Helsingin NMKY	7	1946, 1947, 1984, 1985,1987, 1989, 1992
KTP	6	1958, 1967, 1988, 1991, 1993, 1994
HKT	5	1961, 1962, 1963, 1964, 1965
Tapiolan Honka	5	1968, 1969, 1970, 1971, 1972
Turun NMKY	4	1973, 1975, 1977, 1982
Kouvot	4	1995, 1999, 2004, 2016
Pyrintö	3	2010, 2011, 2014
Kauhajoki Karhu	3	2018, 2019, 2022
Namika Lahti	2	2000, 2009
Lappeenrannan NMKY	2	2005, 2006
Bisons Loimaa	2	2012, 2013
Kataja	2	2015, 2017
Salon Vilpas	2	2021, 2026
Helsinki Seagulls	2	2023, 2025
Ylioppilaskoripalloilijat	1	1939
Eiran Kisa-Veikot	1	1940
Kadettikoulu	1	1941
Korihait	1	1990
BC Nokia	1	2024

== Records ==
=== All-time table of teams ===
Updated after the 2021–22 season.

Rank	Team	Seasons	GP	W	L	D	W%	1st place, gold medalist(s)	2nd place, silver medalist(s)	3rd place, bronze medalist(s)
1.	KTP-Basket	67	2283	1273	1009	1	55.8	6	7	12
2.	Torpan Pojat	51	1663	995	662	6	59.8	9	9	7
3.	Tampereen Pyrintö	57	1921	962	950	9	50.1	3	5	1
4.	Kouvot	31	1311	711	600	0	54.2	4	4	1
5.	Kataja Basket	29	1230	705	525	0	57.3	2	6	5
6.	Pantterit	54	1284	695	582	7	54.1	14	4	3
7.	Korihait	40	1542	664	878	0	43.1	1	1	3
8.	Helsingin NMKY	48	1191	645	543	3	54.2	7	3	8
9.	Namika Lahti	35	1249	639	610	0	51.2	2	4	1
10.	Tapiolan Honka 00ers	36	1089	600	489	0	55.1	6	5	5

=== All-time individual player records ===
==== Career leaders ====
The following table lists the all-time cumulative record holder in each category, inclusive of regular season and playoff games.

Category	Player	Total	Games played
Games	(Finland) Timo Heinonen	1,023	—N/a
Points	(United States) / (Finland) Gerald Lee Sr.	14,088	639
Rebounds	(United States) Damon Williams	5,674	580
Assists	(Bosnia and Herzegovina) Bojan Šarčević	3,379	772
Steals	(United States) / (Finland) Gerald Lee Sr.	1,267	639
Blocks	(Finland) Pekka Markkanen	678	426

==== Single-season leaders ====
The following table lists the single-season record holder in each category, only regular season statistics are included.

Category	Player	Total	Season
Points	(United States) Joe Wright	1,367	1991–92
Rebounds	(United States) Raymond White	692	1981–82
Assists	(Finland) Teemu Rannikko	336	2015–16
Steals	(United States) Obie Trotter	136	2009–10
Blocks	(United States) Faisal Abraham	149	1998–99

=== Single-game records ===
The following table lists the single-game record holder in each category, inclusive of regular season and playoff games.

Category	Player	Record	Date	Game
Points	(United States) Joe Wright	79	12 February 1992	Turun NMKY 117–145 Pantterit
Rebounds	(United States) / (Finland) Garcia Hopkins	42	16 February 1986	Tampereen Pyrintö 131–80 Säynätsalon Riento
Assists	(Finland) Petri Niiranen	23	16 February 1992	Helsingin NMKY 129–112 Turun NMKY
Efficiency	(United States) / (Finland) Larry Pounds	70	24 November 1985	KTP-Basket 100–73 Säynätsalo Riento
Steals	(United States) / (Finland) Gerald Lee Sr.	12	15 February 1989	Uudenkaupungin Urheilijat 108–91 Pantterit
Blocks	(United States) Damon Vance	14	23 March 1988	Forssan Koripojat 102–111 Salon Palloilijat
2-point field goals	(United States) Cheyenne Jones	25	4 December 1982	Joensuun Kataja 92–96 Tampereen Pyrintö
3-point field goals	(United States) Adonis Jordan	14	17 October 1999	Espoon Honka 98–84 Pussihukat
Free throws	(United States) Joe Wright	21	15 January 1992	Turun NMKY 112–102 KTP-Basket

== Awards ==
- Finnish Basketball Hall of Fame

=== Seasonal awards ===
- MVP
- Finals MVP
- Defensive Player of the Year
- Rookie of the Year
- Most Improved Player
- Sixth Man of the Year
- Coach of the Year
- Referee of the Year

== Attendance ==
Averages

Season	Avg
1985–1986	248
1986–1987	546
1987–1988	550
1988–1989	367
1989–1990	609
1990–1991	686
1991–1992	643
1992–1993	571
1993–1994	588
1994–1995	660
1995–1996	719
1996–1997	668
1997–1998	793
1998–1999	809
1999–2000	785
2000–2001	736
2001–2002	790
2002–2003	728
2003–2004	808
2004–2005	850
2005–2006	863
2006–2007	918
2007–2008	883
2008–2009	911
2009–2010	905
2010–2011	868
2011–2012	949
2012–2013	776
2013–2014	861
2014–2015	938
2015–2016	1,024
2016–2017	1,017
2017–2018	874
2018–2019	907
2019–2020	830
2020–2021	144
2021–2022	640
2022–2023	879

Records

Attendance	Game	Year
7,420	Torpan Pojat – Espoon Honka	2005
6,580	Torpan Pojat – Kouvot	1998
6,500	Turun NMKY – Forssan Koripojat	1990
5,450	Espoon Honka – Namika Lahti	2002
5,128	Espoon Honka – Piiloset	2000
4,630	Namika Lahti – Kouvot	2004
4,097	Torpan Pojat – Karkkilan Urheilijat	1998
3,900	Kataja Basket — Salon Vilpas	2017

== See also ==
- Finnish Basketball Cup
