= NMKY Helsinki =

- Leagues: I division A
- Founded: 1888
- Arena: Malmin palloiluhalli
- Location: Helsinki, Finland
- Team colors: Black and Red
- Championships: 7 (Korisliiga)
- Website: www.hnmky.fi
Home	Away

NMKY Helsinki (Finnish: Helsingin NMKY, HNMKY for short) is a YMCA in Helsinki, Finland, best known for its basketball section. Other activities include sports like floorball and martial arts, scouting, choirs, orchestras and various youth clubs.

== Basketball ==
The basketball section of NMKY Helsinki was founded in 1927 as the first basketball club in Finland. Due to financial difficulties, both men and women's first squads were dissolved in 2009. HNMKY currently plays in the Finnish second tier I division A.

=== Honours ===
- Finnish Championship (7): 1946, 1947, 1984, 1985,1987, 1989, 1992

== Sources ==
- Basketball in English NMKY Helsinki Official Homepage
