= Turun NMKY =

Turun NMKY (YMCA Turku) is a Finnish professional basketball club, based in Turku. The club plays in men's I-B-division.

== History ==
Turun NMKY was founded in 1920. The team has played in a total of 32 through the top league level championships. NMKY has won the championship in Finland and the Finnish Cup, both four times. In the 1996-2000 period the club was also known as Piiloset. In 2000, the Turun NMKY dropped on SM-series due to non-performing debt. After a period of 2007 to 2008 it gave up from the I-division. The rise back to the I-division occurred 2012. However, the team played just one year, I division, and 2014-2015 II-division.

== Honours & achievements ==
Finnish League

- Winners (4): 1972-73, 1974–75, 1976–77, 1981-82

Finnish Cup

- Winners (4): 1972, 1976, 1982, 1999
- Runners-up (1): 1981

== Former coaches ==
- (Finland) Pieti Poikola
