= 2013–14 EuroChallenge Quarterfinals =

Results for the Quarterfinals of the 2013–14 EuroChallenge basketball tournament. The quarterfinals were played on 11, 13 and 18 March 2014. Team #1 (i.e., the group winner in each series) hosted Game 1, plus Game 3 if necessary. Team #2 hosted Game 2.

All times given below are in Central European Time.

== Quarterfinals ==
Team 1	Agg.	Team 2	Game 1	Game 2	Game 3
Tartu Ülikool/Rock (Estonia)	1–2	(Hungary) Szolnoki Olaj KK	87–83	73–80	60–78
Grissin Bon Reggio Emilia (Italy)	2–0	(Russia) Krasnye Krylia Samara	75–63	73–71	
Royal Halı Gaziantep (Turkey)	2–0	(Belarus) Tsmoki Minsk	59–58	68–67	
BC Ural Yekaterinburg (Russia)	0–2	(Russia) Triumph Lyubertsy	72–80	67–110	

== Game 1 ==
March 11, 2014	Tartu Ülikool/Rock (Estonia)	87–83	(Hungary) Szolnoki Olaj KK	Tartu, Estonia
19:00	Scoring by quarter: 22–23, 25–12, 19–19, 21–29
	Pts: Tanel Kurbas 19; Rebs: Vilmantas Dilys 9 Asts: Vincent Simpson 8	Report	Pts: Peter Lorant 23; Rebs: Peter Lorant 8 Asts: Justin Holiday 6	Attendance: 2,300; Referees: Janusz Calik (POL), Nebojsa Kovacevic (GER), Christoph Rohacky (AUT)

March 11, 2014	Royal Halı Gaziantep (Turkey)	59–58	(Belarus) Tsmoki Minsk	Gaziantep, Turkey
19:00	Scoring by quarter: 10–18, 13–20, 16–11, 20–9
	Pts: Domen Lorbek 15; Rebs: Oliver Stević 16; Asts: Baris Ermis 7	Report	Pts: Branko Mirković 19; Rebs: Demonte Harper 9 Asts: Branko Mirković, Demonte Harper 3	Attendance: 3,806; Referees: Doru Vinasi (ROU), Milos Koljensic (MNE), Amit Balak (ISR)

March 11, 2014	BC Ural Yekaterinburg (Russia)	72–80	(Russia) Triumph Lyubertsy	Ekaterinburg, Russia
19:00	Scoring by quarter: 16–21, 17–21, 25–18, 14–20
	Pts: Lance Harris 27; Rebs: Lance Harris 6 Asts: Anton Glazunov 5	Report	Pts: Jeremy Chappell 16; Rebs: Evgeny Voronov, Kyle Landry 7 Asts: Evgeny Voronov 4	Attendance: 3,500; Referees: Dragan Neskovic (SRB), Erez Gurion (ISR), Yener Yilmaz (TUR)

March 11, 2014	Grissin Bon Reggio Emilia (Italy)	75–63	(Russia) Krasnye Krylia Samara	Reggio Emilia, Italy
20:30	Scoring by quarter: 17–16, 20–13, 15–16, 23–18
	Pts: Andrea Cinciarini 19; Rebs: James White 6 Asts: Andrea Cinciarini 7	Report	Pts: Larry O'Bannon, Michał Ignerski 15; Rebs: Aaron Miles 8 Asts: Aaron Miles 2	Attendance: 1,418; Referees: Ademir Zurapovic (BIH), Ognjen Jokic (MNE), Sebastien Clivaz (SUI)

=== Game 2 ===
March 13, 2014	Szolnoki Olaj KK (Hungary)	80–73	(Estonia) Tartu Ülikool/Rock	Szolnok, Hungary
18:00	Scoring by quarter: 17–22, 25–13, 21–16, 17–22
	Pts: Peter Lorant 16; Rebs: Peter Lorant 14; Asts: Obie Trotter 4	Report	Pts: Tanel Kurbas 18; Rebs: Tanel Kurbas 7 Asts: Tanel Kurbas, Augustas Peciukevicius 6	Attendance: 1,700; Referees: Zoran Sutulovic (MNE), Georgios Tanatzis (GRE), Jean-Charles Collin (FRA)

March 13, 2014	Tsmoki Minsk (Belarus)	67–68	(Turkey) Royal Halı Gaziantep	Minsk, Belarus
19:00	Scoring by quarter: 12–11, 12–17, 17–19, 26–21
	Pts: Pavel Ulyanko 17; Rebs: Dzianis Korshuk, Demonte Harper 5 Asts: Demonte Harper, Branko Mirković 4	Report	Pts: Dejan Borovnjak 22; Rebs: Dejan Borovnjak 12; Asts: Baris Ermis 3	Attendance: 2,500; Referees: Ivo Dolinek (CZE), Vladimir Tsekov (BUL), Vilius Mačiulaitis (LTU)

March 13, 2014	Triumph Lyubertsy (Russia)	110–67	(Russia) BC Ural Yekaterinburg	Moscow Region, Russia
19:30	Scoring by quarter: 27–19, 25–20, 35–15, 23–13
	Pts: Courdon Higgins 32; Rebs: Milovan Rakovic 5 Asts: Jeremy Chappell 8	Report	Pts: Aaron McGhee, Fedor Kliuchnikov 18; Rebs: Dmitry Flis 8 Asts: Anton Glazunov 4	Attendance: 1,270; Referees: Engin Kennerman (TUR), Vaclav Lukes (CZE), Aliaksandr Syrytsa (BLR)

March 13, 2014	Krasnye Krylia Samara (Russia)	71–73	(Italy) Grissin Bon Reggio Emilia	Samara, Russia
19:00	Scoring by quarter: 17–20, 19–16, 15–19, 20–18
	Pts: Demetris Nichols 20; Rebs: Demetris Nichols 8 Asts: Aaron Miles 9	Report	Pts: Rimantas Kaukenas 22; Rebs: James White 8 Asts: Andrea Cinciarini 6	Attendance: 1,500; Referees: Igor Dragojevic (MNE), Ingus Baumanis (LAT), Ciprian Stoica (ROU)

== Game 3 ==
March 18, 2014	Tartu Ülikool/Rock (Estonia)	60–78	(Hungary) Szolnoki Olaj KK	Tartu, Estonia
19:00	Scoring by quarter: 14–16, 15–16, 10–19, 21–27
	Pts: Gert Dorbek 12; Rebs: Janar Talts 9 Asts: Augustas Peciukevicius 3	Report	Pts: Marton Bader, Justin Holiday 18; Rebs: Peter Lorant 13; Asts: Justin Holiday 4	Attendance: 2,200; Referees: Andris Aunkrogers (LAT), Sergei Beliakov (RUS), Mathieu Hosselet (FRA)
