= 2013–14 EuroChallenge =

EuroChallenge
- Season: 2013–14
- Duration: 24 October 2013 – 27 April 2014
- Games played: 157 (total)
- Teams: 32

Finals
- Champions: (Italy) Grissin Bon Reggio Emilia (1st title)
- Runners-up: (Russia) Triumph Lyubertsy
- Third place: (Turkey) Royal Halı Gaziantep
- Fourth place: (Hungary) Szolnoki Olaj
- Final Four MVP: (Italy) Andrea Cinciarini

Statistical leaders
Points	(United States) Sharaud Curry	20.1
Rebounds	(Belgium) Maxime De Zeeuw	8.0
Assists	(Russia) Anton Glazunov	7.1

The 2013–14 EuroChallenge was the 11th edition of Europe's third-tier level transnational competition for men's professional basketball clubs. The winner and the runner-up of this competition earned a place at the group stage of the 2014–15 Eurocup season.

The Final Four was held in PalaDozza in Bologna, Italy. The host of the tournament, Grissin Bon Reggio Emilia won the Final by beating Triumph Lyubertsy 79–65. Italian player Andrea Cinciarini received the Final Four MVP award.

== Competition format changes ==
This year's EuroChallenge saw a number of innovations, including the division of the participating clubs into two main Conferences for the Regular Season - Conference 1 and Conference 2 - based on a broad geographical criteria. This year no qualification round was held. The 32 teams were divided into eight round-robin groups of four teams each for the regular season. The two best-placed teams qualified to the next phase of the competition.

== Teams ==
The labels in the parentheses show how each team qualified for the place of its starting round. (TH: Title holder)

- 1st, 2nd, 3rd, 4th, 5th, etc.: League position after eventual playoffs

Regular season
(Hungary) Szolnoki Olaj (2nd)	(Russia) Krasnye Krylia^{TH} (6th)	(Estonia) Tartu University Rock (2nd)	(Belarus) Tsmoki Minsk (1st)
(Hungary) Atomerőmű SE (3rd)	(Russia) Triumph Lyubertsy (7th)	(Estonia) Rakvere Tarvas (3rd)	(Bulgaria) Rilski Sportist (3rd)
(Hungary) Fortress Jászberényi (5th)	(Russia) Ural Yekaterinburg (Note: Ural Yekateringburg won the 2012–13 Russian Basketball Super League, the second division of Russian basketball.) (1st)	(France) JDA Dijon (8th)	(Denmark) Bakken Bears (1st)
(Hungary) Ingoknito Fashion Körmend (6th)	(Romania) Mureș (2nd)	(France) Cholet (10th)	(Italy) Grissin Bon Reggio Emilia (7th)
(Netherlands) ZZ Leiden (1st)	(Romania) Oradea (3rd)	(Finland) Team TEHO Sport (2nd)	(Latvia) Ventspils (2nd)
(Netherlands) SPM Shoeters Den Bosch (3rd)	(Romania) Gaz Metan Mediaș (4th)	(Finland) Kataja (3rd)	(Slovenia) Krka (1st)
(Netherlands) GasTerra Flames (4th)	(Belgium) Okapi Aalstar (4th)	(Turkey) Tofaş (8th)	(Sweden) Södertälje Kings (1st)
(Ukraine) Kyiv (14th)	(Belgium) Port of Antwerp Giants (5th)	(Turkey) Royal Halı Gaziantep (9th)	(Austria) Zepter Vienna (1st)

== Draw ==
The draws for the 2013–14 FIBA EuroChallenge were held on Friday, July 5 in Munich, Germany. Teams were seeded into four pots of four teams in accordance with the FIBA Club ranking, based on their performance in European competitions during a three-year period.

The 32 clubs registered for this year's competition were divided into two conferences (1 and 2), based on broad geographical criteria.

Conference 1

Seed 1	Seed 2	Seed 3	Seed 4
(Latvia) BK Ventspils (Belgium) Antwerp Giants (Belgium) Okapi Aalstar (France) Cholet Basket	(Finland) Joensuun Kataja (Estonia) Tartu Ülikool/Rock (France) JDA Dijon (Italy) Grissin Bon Reggio Emilia	(Netherlands) ZZ Leiden (Sweden) Södertälje BBK (Netherlands) SPM Shoeters (Netherlands) GasTerra Flames	(Estonia) Rakvere Tarvas (Austria) Zepter Vienna (Denmark) Bakken Bears (Finland) Team TEHO Sport Kotka

Conference 2

Seed 1	Seed 2	Seed 3	Seed 4
(Slovenia) KK Krka (Russia) Krasnye Krylya Samara (Hungary) Szolnoki Olaj KK (Russia) Triumph Lyubertsy	(Belarus) Tsmoki Minsk (Romania) Gaz Metan Mediaș (Turkey) Tofaş Bursa (Hungary) Atomerőmű SE	(Hungary) BC Körmend (Russia) BC Ural Yekaterinburg (Bulgaria) Rilski Sportist (Turkey) Royal Halı Gaziantep	(Ukraine) BC Kyiv (Hungary) Jászberényi KSE (Romania) BC Mureș (Romania) CSM Oradea

== Regular season ==
The regular season began on November 5.

If teams are level on record at the end of the Regular Season, tiebreakers are applied in the following order:

1. Head-to-head record.
2. Head-to-head point differential.
3. Point differential during the Regular Season.
4. Points scored during the regular season.
5. Sum of quotients of points scored and points allowed in each Regular Season match.

Key to colors
Top two places in each group advance to Last 16
Eliminated

=== Group A ===
Pos	Team	Pld	W	L	PF	PA	PD	Pts	Qualification	ANT	JDA	SPM	RAK
1	(Belgium) Port of Antwerp Giants	6	4	2	461	432	+29	10	Advance to last 16	—	81–59	77–72	78–73
2	(France) JDA Dijon	6	4	2	425	396	+29	10	Advance to last 16	68–74	—	83–64	80–47
3	(Netherlands) SPM Shoeters Den Bosch	6	3	3	433	434	−1	9		83–76	66–70	—	78–71
4	(Estonia) Rakvere Tarvas	6	1	5	389	446	−57	7		77–75	64–65	57–70	—

Source: FIBA Europe

=== Group B ===
Pos	Team	Pld	W	L	PF	PA	PD	Pts	Qualification	GAZ	KRA	ORA	ASE
1	(Turkey) Royal Halı Gaziantep	6	4	2	456	423	+33	10	Advance to last 16	—	71–63	69–74	75–63
2	(Russia) Krasnye Krylia	6	4	2	493	447	+46	10	Advance to last 16	89–96	—	84–75	79–75
3	(Romania) Oradea	6	3	3	463	465	−2	9		73–71	74–89	—	90–74
4	(Hungary) Atomerőmű SE	6	1	5	407	484	−77	7		61–74	56–89	78–77	—

Source: FIBA Europe

=== Group C ===
Pos	Team	Pld	W	L	PF	PA	PD	Pts	Qualification	TAR	VEN	SÖD	ZEP
1	(Estonia) Tartu University Rock	6	4	2	478	408	+70	10	Advance to last 16	—	65–66	99–65	83–60
2	(Latvia) Ventspils	6	4	2	420	419	+1	10	Advance to last 16	63–81	—	73–76	61–56
3	(Sweden) Södertälje Kings	6	3	3	441	473	−32	9		72–76	83–80	—	82–73
4	(Austria) Zepter Vienna	6	1	5	415	454	−39	7		82–74	71–78	73–76	—

Source: FIBA Europe

=== Group D ===
Pos	Team	Pld	W	L	PF	PA	PD	Pts	Qualification	TRI	GAZ	KYI	KÖR
1	(Russia) Triumph Lyubertsy	6	5	1	494	409	+85	11	Advance to last 16	—	94–72	94–58	90–74
2	(Romania) Gaz Metan Mediaș	6	4	2	468	461	+7	10	Advance to last 16	81–84	—	82–69	77–72
3	(Ukraine) Kyiv	6	2	4	456	478	−22	8		54–52	74–83	—	102–64
4	(Hungary) Ingoknito Fashion Körmend	6	1	5	451	521	−70	7		60–70	68–73	103–99	—

Source: FIBA Europe

=== Group E ===
Pos	Team	Pld	W	L	PF	PA	PD	Pts	Qualification	REG	TEHO	OKA	GTF
1	(Italy) Grissin Bon Reggio Emilia	6	4	2	453	430	+23	10	Advance to last 16	—	86–75	80–63	78–61
2	(Finland) Team TEHO Sport	6	3	3	467	476	−9	9	Advance to last 16	75–71	—	74–77	77–83
3	(Belgium) Okapi Aalstar	6	3	3	451	467	−16	9		71–78	87–90	—	83–82
4	(Netherlands) GasTerra Flames	6	2	4	446	444	+2	8		85–60	72–76	63–70	—

Source: FIBA Europe

=== Group F ===
Pos	Team	Pld	W	L	PF	PA	PD	Pts	Qualification	URA	KRK	TOF	JÁS
1	(Russia) Ural Yekaterinburg	6	5	1	482	444	+38	11	Advance to last 16	—	79–68	74–70	88–85
2	(Slovenia) Krka	6	3	3	425	398	+27	9	Advance to last 16	80–75	—	71–61	76–61
3	(Turkey) Tofaş	6	3	3	451	425	+26	9		77–82	81–72	—	86–72
4	(Hungary) Fortress Jászberényi	6	0	6	377	468	−91	6		64–84	41–58	54–76	—

Source: FIBA Europe

=== Group G ===
Pos	Team	Pld	W	L	PF	PA	PD	Pts	Qualification	CHO	BAK	KAT	ZZL
1	(France) Cholet	6	5	1	441	397	+44	11	Advance to last 16	—	84–67	70–69	74–52
2	(Denmark) Bakken Bears	6	3	3	443	450	−7	9	Advance to last 16	66–68	—	101–90	79–81
3	(Finland) Kataja	6	2	4	436	444	−8	8		76–70	66–68	—	77–63
4	(Netherlands) ZZ Leiden	6	2	4	396	425	−29	8		67–76	61–62	72–58	—

Source: FIBA Europe

=== Group H ===
Pos	Team	Pld	W	L	PF	PA	PD	Pts	Qualification	TSM	SZO	MUR	RIL
1	(Belarus) Tsmoki-Minsk	6	4	2	479	450	+29	10	Advance to last 16	—	76–68	79–83	94–75
2	(Hungary) Szolnoki Olaj	6	4	2	441	434	+7	10	Advance to last 16	69–68	—	68–76	73–66
3	(Romania) Mureș	6	3	3	473	471	+2	9		82–84	72–85	—	92–85
4	(Bulgaria) Rilski Sportist	6	1	5	445	483	−38	7		73–78	76–78	70–68	—

Source: FIBA Europe

== Last 16 ==
Key to colors
Homecourt advantage for quarterfinals
Advance to quarterfinals
Eliminated

=== Group I ===
Pos	Team	Pld	W	L	PF	PA	PD	Pts	Qualification	TAR	KRA	ANT	GAZ
1	(Estonia) Tartu University Rock	6	5	1	487	418	+69	11	Advance to quarterfinals	—	94–73	82–74	97–67
2	(Russia) Krasnye Krylia	6	4	2	467	434	+33	10	Advance to quarterfinals	74–75	—	87–67	78–60
3	(Belgium) Port of Antwerp Giants	6	3	3	454	461	−7	9		64–59	71–75	—	97–79
4	(Romania) Gaz Metan Mediaș	6	0	6	428	523	−95	6		66–90	77–80	79–81	—

Source: FIBA Europe

=== Group J ===
Team	Pld	W	L	PF	PA	PD	Pts
(Italy) Grissin Bon Reggio Emilia	6	4	2	479	441	+38	10
(Hungary) Szolnoki Olaj KK	6	4	2	460	442	+18	10
(Slovenia) KK Krka	6	3	3	447	445	+2	9
(France) Cholet Basket	6	1	5	434	492	−58	7

	REG	KRK	CHO	SZO
(Italy) Grissin Bon Reggio Emilia		82–71	82–65	90–68
(Slovenia) KK Krka	66–69		80–63	89–78
(France) Cholet Basket	81–78	88–93		70–85
(Hungary) Szolnoki Olaj KK	90–78	65–48	74–67	

=== Group K ===
Team	Pld	W	L	PF	PA	PD	Pts
(Turkey) Royal Halı Gaziantep	6	6	0	436	376	+60	12
(Russia) Triumph Lyubertsy	6	4	2	424	414	+10	10
(Latvia) BK Ventspils	6	1	5	385	427	−42	7
(France) JDA Dijon	6	1	5	404	432	−28	7

	JDA	GAZ	VEN	TRI
(France) JDA Dijon		76–82	74–72	66–68
(Turkey) Royal Halı Gaziantep	69–60		72–61	64–59
(Latvia) BK Ventspils	69–59	46–71		66–71
(Russia) Triumph Lyubertsy	72–69	74–78	80–71	

=== Group L ===
Team	Pld	W	L	PF	PA	PD	Pts
(Russia) BC Ural Yekaterinburg	6	5	1	487	460	+27	11
(Belarus) Tsmoki Minsk	6	4	2	537	430	+107	10
(Finland) Team TEHO Sport Kotka	6	2	4	445	521	−76	8
(Denmark) Bakken Bears	6	1	5	455	513	−58	7

	KTP	URA	BAK	MIN
(Finland) Team TEHO Sport Kotka		75–86	82–79	64–100
(Russia) BC Ural Yekaterinburg	66–61		85–71	69–65
(Denmark) Bakken Bears	86–90	92–84		76–83
(Belarus) Tsmoki Minsk	104–73	96–97	89–51	

== Quarterfinals ==
The quarter-finals were played in a best-of-three series. The dates of the matches were 11, 13 and 18 March. Team 1 played the first and the third game at home court.

Team 1	Agg.	Team 2	Game 1	Game 2	Game 3
Tartu University Rock (Estonia)	1–2	(Hungary) Szolnoki Olaj	87–83	73–80	60–78
Grissin Bon Reggio Emilia (Italy)	2–0	(Russia) Krasnye Krylia	75–63	73–71	
Royal Halı Gaziantep (Turkey)	2–0	(Belarus) Tsmoki-Minsk	59–58	68–67	
Ural Yekaterinburg (Russia)	0–2	(Russia) Triumph Lyubertsy	72–80	67–110	

== Final Four ==
The Final Four was played between the four winners of the quarterfinals at PalaDozza in Bologna, Italy. It was the second time the EuroChallenge Final Four was held in Bologna.

Semifinals; 25 April
(Russia) Triumph Lyubertsy	61
(Hungary) Szolnoki Olaj	59
(Turkey) Royal Halı Gaziantep	55
(Italy) Grissin Bon Reggio Emilia	66

Final; 27 April
(Russia) Triumph Lyubertsy	65
(Italy) Grissin Bon Reggio Emilia	79
Third place game
(Hungary) Szolnoki Olaj	75
(Turkey) Royal Halı Gaziantep	87

== Individual statistics ==
=== Points ===
Rank	Name	Team	Games	Total	PPG
1	(United States) Sharaud Curry	(Finland) Team TEHO Sport Kotka	10	201	20.1
2	(United States) Cory Higgins	(Russia) Triumph Lyubertsy	15	248	17.9
3	(United States) Keith Benson	(Belarus) Tsmoki-Minsk	12	208	17.3
4	(United States) Aaron McGhee	(Russia) Ural Yekaterinburg	13	223	17.2
5	(United States) Lance Harris	(Russia) Ural Yekaterinburg	13	218	16.8

=== Rebounds ===
Rank	Name	Team	Games	Total	RPG
1	(Belgium) Maxime De Zeeuw	(Belgium) Port of Antwerp Giants	11	88	8.0
2	(United States) Aaron McGhee	(Russia) Ural Yekaterinburg	13	103	7.9
3	(Serbia) Oliver Stević	(Turkey) Royal Halı Gaziantep	15	114	7.6
4	(United States) Keith Benson	(Belarus) Tsmoki-Minsk	12	87	7.3
5	(Estonia) Janar Talts	(Estonia) Tartu Ülikool/Rock	15	105	7.0

=== Assists ===
Rank	Name	Team	Games	Total	APG
1	(Russia) Anton Glazunov	(Russia) Ural Yekaterinburg	13	92	7.1
2	(United States) Sharaud Curry	(Finland) Team TEHO Sport Kotka	10	67	6.7
3	(United States) Aaron Miles	(Russia) Krasnye Krylia	13	87	6.7
4	(Italy) Andrea Cinciarini	(Italy) Grissin Bon Reggio Emilia	12	76	6.3
5	(Turkey) Barış Ermiş	(Turkey) Royal Halı Gaziantep	9	54	6.0

=== Individual highs ===
Category	Player	Number
Points	(United States) Sharaud Curry	38
Rebounds	(United States) Lance Harris	21
Assists	(United States) Aaron Miles (2)	13
Steals	(United States) Demonte Harper	8
Three pointers	(Finland) Jukka Matinen	7
Three pointers	(Estonia) Kristo Saage	7
Blocks	(United States) Jason Conrad	7

== Awards ==
=== Weekly MVP ===
Regular season

Week	Player	Team	PIR
1	(Belgium) Maxime de Zeeuw	(Belgium) Port of Antwerp Giants	31
1	(Switzerland) Greg Brunner	(Italy) Grissin Bon Reggio Emilia	31
2	(Nigeria) Chinemelu Elonu	(Turkey) Tofaş Bursa	35
3	(United States) Courdon Higgins	(Russia) Triumph Lyubertsy	36
4	(Serbia) Rastko Dramićanin	(Hungary) Fortress Jászberényi	32
5	(United States) Keith Benson	(Belarus) BC Tsmoki-Minsk	36
6	(United States) Aaron McGhee	(Russia) BC Ural Yekaterinburg	31
7	(United States) Sean Barnette	(Bulgaria) BC Rilski Sportist	38

Last 16

Week	Player	Team	PIR
1	(United States) Aaron Miles	(Russia) Krasnye Krylia	29
2	(United States) Aaron McGhee (2)	(Russia) BC Ural Yekaterinburg	30
2	(Russia) Dmitry Flis	(Russia) BC Ural Yekaterinburg	30
2	(Turkey) Barış Ermiş	(Turkey) Royal Halı Gaziantep	30
3	(Italy) Andrea Cinciarini	(Italy) Grissin Bon Reggio Emilia	33
4	(Lithuania) Vilmantas Dilys	(Estonia) Tartu Ülikool/Rock	30
4	(United States) Willie Kemp	(Romania) Gaz Metan Mediaș	30
5	(United States) Sharaud Curry	(Finland) Team TEHO Sport Kotka	26
6	(United States) James White	(Italy) Grissin Bon Reggio Emilia	31

Quarterfinals

Week	Player	Team	PIR
1	(United States) Lance Harris	(Russia) BC Ural Yekaterinburg	28
1	(United States) Justin Holiday	(Hungary) Szolnoki Olaj KK	28
2	(Serbia) Dejan Borovnjak	(Turkey) Royal Halı Gaziantep	31

=== Final Four MVP ===
- (Italy) Andrea Cinciarini (Grissin Bon Reggio Emilia)

== See also ==
- 2013–14 Euroleague
- 2013–14 Eurocup
