= Perce Point =

Perce Point (72°8′S 74°38′W) is a low ice-covered headland 12 nautical miles (22 km) west-northwest of Berlioz Point on the southern coast of the Beethoven Peninsula, situated in the southwest portion of Alexander Island, Antarctica. The headland was first discovered by Snow, Perce and Carroll of the United States Antarctic Service (USAS) expedition in a flight from Stonington Island on 22 December 1940. Originally named "Cape Perce" after Earl B. Perce, co-pilot of the discovery aircraft, but the term point is considered appropriate for this feature.

== See also ==
- Ablation Point
- Dykeman Point
- Mazza Point
