= Rameau Inlet =

Partly ice-filled inlet in southwest Alexander Island, Antarctica

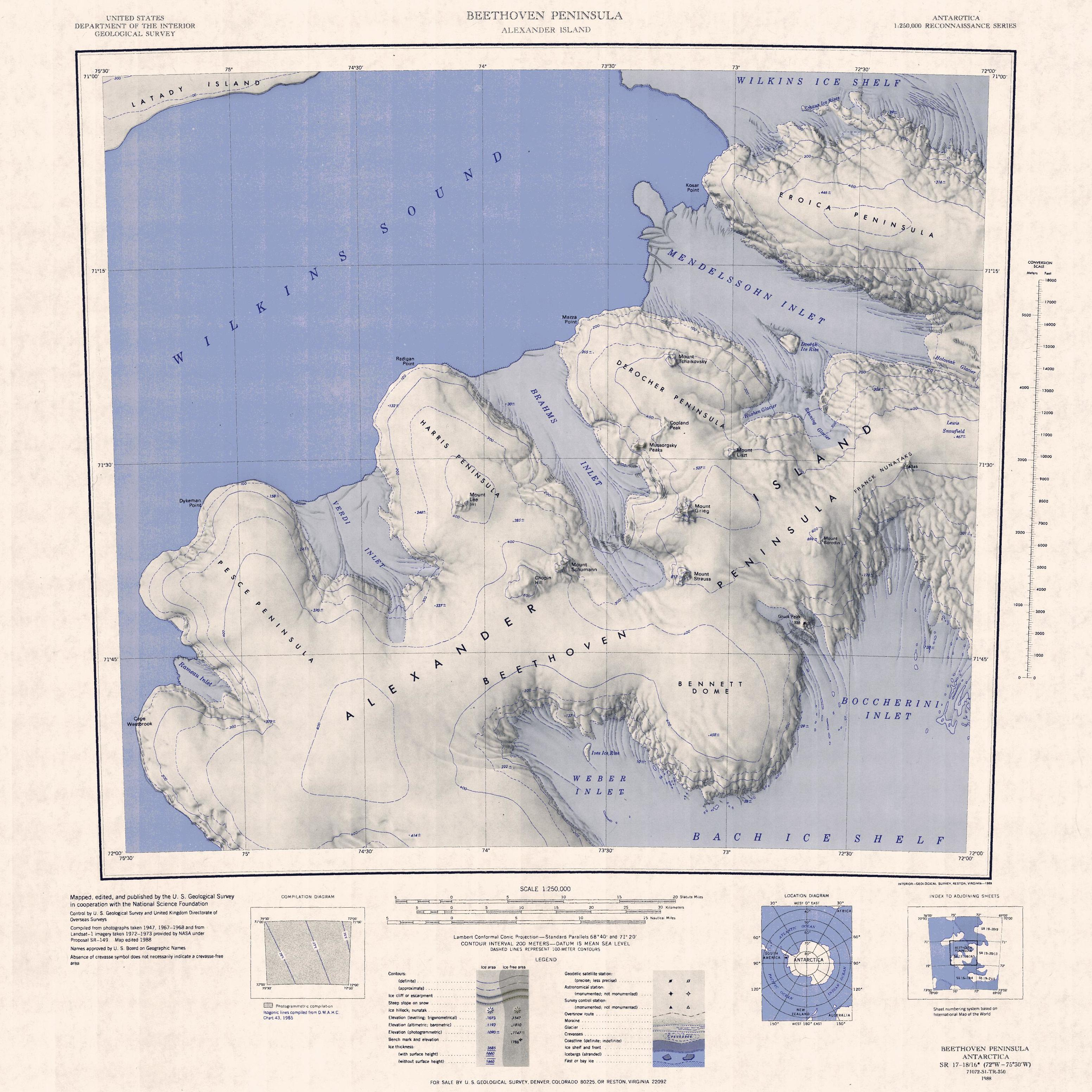
Rameau Inlet

Rameau Inlet (71°46′S 75°13′W) is a partly ice-filled inlet located in southwest Alexander Island, Antarctica. The Inlet makes a large indent on the north side of the Beethoven Peninsula, lying between Pesce Peninsula and Cape Westbrook, marking the southwest extremity of Alexander Island. Delineated from U.S. Landsat imagery of January 29, 1973, by DOS. In association with names of composers in the area, named by United Kingdom Antarctic Place-Names Committee (UK-APC) after Jean Philippe Rameau (1683–1764), French composer.

== See also ==
- Fauré Inlet
- Haydn Inlet
- Schubert Inlet
