= 2014 EuroChallenge Final Four =

Tournament details
- Arena: PalaDozza; Bologna, Italy
- Dates: April 25, 2014 – April 27, 2014

Final positions
- Champions: (Italy) Grissin Bon Reggio Emilia
- Runners-up: (Russia) Triumph Lyubertsy
- Third place: (Turkey) Royal Halı Gaziantep
- Fourth place: (Hungary) Szolnoki Olaj KK

Awards and statistics
- MVP: (Italy) Andrea Cinciarini

The 2014 EuroChallenge Final Four was the concluding tournament of the 2013–14 EuroChallenge season. The tournament was held in the PalaDozza in Bologna, Italy. It was the second time a EuroChallenge Final Four was held in Bologna.

Host Grissin Bon Reggio Emilia came out of the tournament as the EuroChallenge champion, after it beat Triumph Lyubertsy in the Final. The Italian player Andrea Cinciarini won the MVP award.

== Bracket ==
Semifinals; 25 April
(Russia) Triumph Lyubertsy	61
(Hungary) Szolnoki Olaj	59
(Turkey) Royal Halı Gaziantep	55
(Italy) Grissin Bon Reggio Emilia	66

Final; 27 April
(Russia) Triumph Lyubertsy	65
(Italy) Grissin Bon Reggio Emilia	79
Third place game
(Hungary) Szolnoki Olaj	75
(Turkey) Royal Halı Gaziantep	87

== Semifinals ==
25 April 2014
18:00 (CET)

Boxscore

Szolnoki Olaj KK (Hungary)	59–61	(Russia) Triumph Lyubertsy
Scoring by quarter: 14–13, 14–18, 15–12, 16–18
Pts: Holiday 16; Rebs: Milošević 11; Asts: Simon, Vojvoda 2		Pts: Landry 18; Rebs: Kulagin 8 Asts: Kulagin 3

PalaDozza, Bologna, Italy
Attendance: 4,624
Referees: Ademir Zurapovic (BIH), Nebojsa Kovacevic (GER), Ciprian Stoica (ROU)

25 April 2014
20:30 (CET)

Boxscore

Grissin Bon Reggio Emilia (Italy)	66–55	(Turkey) Royal Halı Gaziantep
Scoring by quarter: 19–16, 14–12, 21–15, 12–12
Pts: Siliņš 14; Rebs: Cinciarini 12; Asts: Cinciarini, Kaukėnas 6		Pts: Borovnjak 14; Rebs: Stević 10; Asts: three players 2

PalaDozza, Bologna, Italy
Attendance: 4,624
Referees: Jose Martin (ESP), Paulo Marques (POR), Sebastien Clivaz (SUI)

== Third place game ==
27 April 2014
16:30 (CET)

Boxscore

Szolnoki Olaj KK (Hungary)	75–87 (OT)	(Turkey) Royal Halı Gaziantep
Scoring by quarter: 17–18, 19–14, 13–26, 19–10, Overtime: 7–19
Pts: Báder 17; Rebs: Báder 8 Asts: Simon 5		Pts: Lorbek, Borovnjak 16; Rebs: Stević 8 Asts: Ermiş, Bremer 4

PalaDozza, Bologna, Italy
Attendance: 4,879
Referees: Ademir Zurapovic (BIH), Paulo Marques (POR), Anastasios Manos (GRE)

== Final ==
27 April 2014
19:00 (CET)

Boxscore

Triumph Lyubertsy (Russia)	65–79	(Italy) Grissin Bon Reggio Emilia
Scoring by quarter: 16-23, 16-25, 17-18, 16-13
Pts: Higgins 21; Rebs: Valiev 7 Asts: Valiev 3		Pts: White 17; Rebs: Cervi 5 Asts: Cinciarini 7

PalaDozza, Bologna, Italy
Attendance: 4,879
Referees: Jose Martin (ESP), Nebojsa Kovacevic (GER), Ciprian Stoica (ROU)

Triumph Lyubertsy	Reggio Emilia

Starters:			P	R	A
PG	7	(United States) Cory Higgins	21	5	2
SG	13	(Russia) Artem Vikhrov	8	2	1
SF	21	(United States) Jeremy Chappell	2	4	1
PF	11	(Russia) Evgeny Valiev	0	7	3
C	50	(Serbia) Milovan Raković	20	3	2
Reserves:			P	R	A
G	12	(Russia) Evgeny Voronov	4	5	1
G	32	(Russia) Dmitry Kulagin	8	2	1
C	33	(Canada) Kyle Landry	8	2	1
G	5	(Russia) Viktor Zaryazhko	0	0	0
G	8	(Russia) Artem Kuzyakin	0	1	0
F	11	(Russia) Pavel Spiridonov	0	0	0
F	4	(Russia) Ivan Lazarev	DNP		
Head coach:
(Russia) Vasiliy Karasev

Game rules

Game played with FIBA rules.

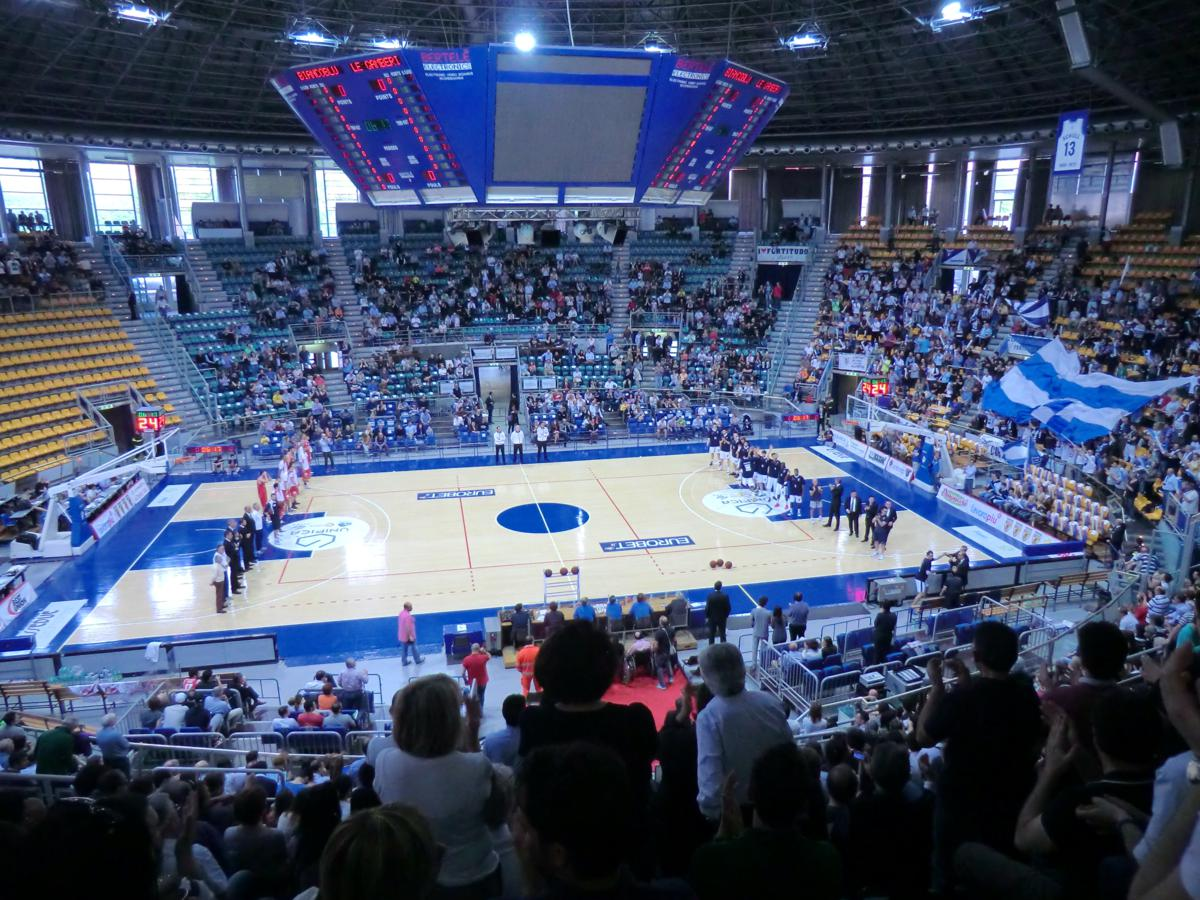
PalaDozza

Starters:			P	R	A
PG	13	(Lithuania) Rimantas Kaukenas	15	2	2
SG	20	(Italy) Andrea Cinciarini	7	3	7
SF	4	(United States) James White	17	4	2
PF	15	(Latvia) Ojārs Siliņš	2	1	0
C	14	(Italy) Riccardo Cervi	7	5	0
Reserves:			P	R	A
PG	5	(Italy) Ariel Faloy	8	0	0
SG	6	(Italy) Angelo Gigli	3	3	0
G	10	(United States) Troy Bell	14	4	2
F	8	(United States) Greg Brunner	6	2	1
G	11	(Italy) Matteo Frassineti	DNP		
G/F	9	(Italy) Michele Antonutti	DNP		
F	7	(Italy) Giovanni Pini	DNP		
Head coach:
(Italy) Massimiliano Menetti
