= Radigan Point =

Radigan Point (71°23′S 74°16′W) is a snow-covered headland lying between Verdi Inlet and Brahms Inlet, marking the north extremity of the Harris Peninsula, a minor peninsula protrudes northward from the Beethoven Peninsula, situated in the southwest portion of Alexander Island, Antarctica. The headland was first photographed from the air by the Ronne Antarctic Research Expedition from 1947 to 1948, and mapped from these photographs by D. Searle of the Falkland Islands Dependencies Survey, 1960. This feature was named by the Advisory Committee on Antarctic Names for Commander Matthew J. Radigan, U.S. Navy. Commanding officer, U.S. Navy Squadron VXE-6, from May 1983 to May 1984.

== See also ==
- Ablation Point
- Kosar Point
- Mazza Point
