= Rachmaninoff Glacier =

Glacier on Alexander Island, Antarctica

Rachmaninoff Glacier (Russian: Lednik Rahmaninova; 72°30′00″S 72°35′00″W) is a glacier flowing south from the Monteverdi Peninsula on Alexander Island, into Britten Inlet. It was named by the USSR Academy of Sciences in 1987 after Sergei Rachmaninoff (1873–1943), the Russian composer.
