= Glazunov =

Glazunov (masculine, Russian: Глазунов) or Glazunova (feminine, Russian: Глазунова) is a Russian surname. Notable people with the surname include:

- Alexander Glazunov (1865–1936), Russian composer
  - Glazunov Glacier in Antarctica named after Alexander
- Andrei Glazunov, 19th-century Russian trade expedition leader
- Anton Glazunov (born 1986), Russian basketball player
- Ilya Glazunov (1930–2017), Russian painter
- Vasili Glazunov (1896–1967), Soviet general, Hero of the Soviet Union
- Arina Glazunova (2000-2024), Russian influencer
