= Dykeman Point =

Snow-covered point on the Beethoven Peninsula, southwest Alexander Island, Antarctica

Dykeman Point (71°33′S 75°8′W) is a snow-covered point between Rameau Inlet and Verdi Inlet, marking the northwestern extremity of Pesce Peninsula on the Beethoven Peninsula, southwest Alexander Island, Antarctica. It was mapped by the United States Geological Survey from U.S. Navy aerial photographs taken 1967–68 and from Landsat imagery taken 1972–73. It was named by the Advisory Committee on Antarctic Names for Commander Paul R. Dykeman, U.S. Navy, commanding officer of Antarctic Development Squadron Six (VXE-6) from May 1981 to May 1982.
