= Eroica Peninsula =

Peninsula in Antarctica

Eroica Peninsula (71°11′S 72°30′W) is an ice-covered peninsula lying north of Beethoven Peninsula and Mendelssohn Inlet in western Alexander Island, Antarctica. The tip of the peninsula is Kosar Point, marking the western extremity of the Eroica Peninsula. It was mapped from trimetrogon air photography taken by the Ronne Antarctic Research Expedition, 1947–48, and from survey by the Falkland Islands Dependencies Survey, 1948–50. It was named by the UK Antarctic Place-Names Committee after Beethoven's Eroica symphony, in association with Beethoven Peninsula. Eroica Peninsula is one of the eight peninsulas of Alexander Island.

== See also ==
- Derocher Peninsula
- Harris Peninsula
- Shostakovich Peninsula
