= Eurocup Basketball 2012–13 Last 16 Group K =

Standings and Results for Group K of the Last 16 phase of the 2012–13 Eurocup basketball tournament.

== Standings ==
Key to colors
Top two places in each group advance to the Quarterfinals

	Team	Pld	W	L	PF	PA	Diff	Tie-break
1.	(Russia) PBC Lokomotiv-Kuban	6	5	1	515	475	+40	
2.	(Russia) BC Spartak Saint Petersburg	6	3	3	456	411	+45	2–0
3.	(Poland) Stelmet Zielona Góra	6	3	3	465	502	–37	0–2
4.	(Spain) Cajasol Sevilla	6	1	5	427	475	–48	

== Fixtures and results ==
All times given below are in Central European Time.

=== Game 1 ===
9 January 2013
17:00

Report

BC Spartak Saint Petersburg (Russia)	70–84	(Russia) PBC Lokomotiv-Kuban
Scoring by quarter: 10–26, 23–18, 19–18, 18–22
Pts: Mavrokefalidis 20; Rebs: Mavrokefalidis 9 Asts: Zavoruev 5		Pts: Brown 21; Rebs: Marić 9 Asts: Calathes 7

Yubileyny Sports Palace, Saint Petersburg
Attendance: 800
Referees: Olegs Latisevs (LAT), Sergiy Chebyshev (UKR), Oskars Lucis (LAT)

9 January 2013
18:00

Report

Stelmet Zielona Góra (Poland)	76–67	(Spain) Cajasol Sevilla
Scoring by quarter: 15–17, 17–22, 25–18, 19–10
Pts: Hodge 27; Rebs: Stević, Hosley 7 Asts: Hosley 8		Pts: Holland 17; Rebs: Williams 10; Asts: Satoranský 6

CRS Hall Zielona Góra, Zielona Góra
Attendance: 3,674
Referees: Srdan Dozai (CRO), Renaud Geller (BEL), Saso Petek (SLO)

=== Game 2 ===
16 January 2013
16:30

Report

PBC Lokomotiv-Kuban (Russia)	96–87	(Poland) Stelmet Zielona Góra
Scoring by quarter: 23–19, 24–30, 24–11, 25–27
Pts: Jasaitis 21; Rebs: Jasaitis, Calathes 6 Asts: Calathes 12		Pts: Hosley 22; Rebs: Borovnjak 13; Asts: Hodge 6

Basket Hall, Krasnodar
Attendance: 3,500
Referees: Sinisa Herceg (CRO), Apostolos Kalpakas (SWE), Moritz Reiter (GER)

16 January 2013
17:00

Report

BC Spartak Saint Petersburg (Russia)	78–59	(Spain) Cajasol Sevilla
Scoring by quarter: 17–13, 24–15, 13–11, 24–20
Pts: Carter 14; Rebs: Wright 6 Asts: Wright 8		Pts: Bogdanović 14; Rebs: Williams 13; Asts: Satoranský 3

Yubileyny Sports Palace, Saint Petersburg
Attendance: 1,300
Referees: Milija Vojinovic (SRB), Carmelo Paternico (ITA), Ersan Kartal (TUR)

=== Game 3 ===
23 January 2013
19:00

Report

Stelmet Zielona Góra (Poland)	69–89	(Russia) BC Spartak Saint Petersburg
Scoring by quarter: 19–24, 8–24, 20–19, 22–22
Pts: Borovnjak 17; Rebs: Stević 10; Asts: Hodge 6		Pts: Mavrokefalidis 19; Rebs: Mavrokefalidis 6 Asts: Zavoruev 8

CRS Hall Zielona Góra, Zielona Góra
Attendance: 3,658
Referees: Andrej Lovsin (SLO), Oliver Krause (GER), Aleksandar Milojevic (MKD)

23 January 2013
20:30

Report

Cajasol Sevilla (Spain)	80–87	(Russia) PBC Lokomotiv-Kuban
Scoring by quarter: 23–17, 18–17, 16–26, 23–27
Pts: Bogdanović 18; Rebs: Satoranský 9 Asts: three players 4		Pts: Brown 28; Rebs: Marić 9 Asts: Calathes 8

Palacio Municipal de Deportes San Pablo, Seville
Attendance: 1,450
Referees: Roberto Chiari (ITA), Marcin Kowalski (POL), Sergio Silva (POR)

=== Game 4 ===
30 January 2013
16:30

Report

PBC Lokomotiv-Kuban (Russia)	83–72	(Spain) Cajasol Sevilla
Scoring by quarter: 15–23, 20–16, 28–13, 20–20
Pts: Brown 20; Rebs: Marić 11; Asts: Kalnietis 8		Pts: Bogdanović 15; Rebs: Williams 7 Asts: Satoranský 5

Basket Hall, Krasnodar
Attendance: 3,500
Referees: Borys Ryzhyk (UKR), Gentian Cici (ALB), Petros Papapetrou (GRE)

30 January 2013
17:00

Report

BC Spartak Saint Petersburg (Russia)	81–54	(Poland) Stelmet Zielona Góra
Scoring by quarter: 18–17, 22–7, 25–18, 16–12
Pts: Wright 17; Rebs: Mavrokefalidis, Kurbanov 7 Asts: Wright 8		Pts: Borovnjak 14; Rebs: Chanas 6 Asts: Hodge 5

Yubileyny Sports Palace, Saint Petersburg
Attendance: 600
Referees: Dubravko Muhvic (CRO), Petri Mantyla (FIN), Arnis Ozols (LAT)

=== Game 5 ===
12 February 2013
20:30

Report

Cajasol Sevilla (Spain)	81–85	(Poland) Stelmet Zielona Góra
Scoring by quarter: 26–16, 17–23, 18–19, 20–27
Pts: Holland 15; Rebs: Balvín 8 Asts: Sastre, Blakney 5		Pts: Hodge 31; Rebs: Stević, Borovnjak 7 Asts: Hodge 5

Palacio Municipal de Deportes San Pablo, Seville
Attendance: 1,250
Referees: Recep Ankarali (TUR), Rustu Nuran (TUR), Haris Bijedic (BIH)

13 February 2013
17:30

Report

PBC Lokomotiv-Kuban (Russia)	77–72	(Russia) BC Spartak Saint Petersburg
Scoring by quarter: 16–13, 20–18, 23–14, 18–27
Pts: Brown 18; Rebs: Calathes 9 Asts: Calathes 5		Pts: Carter 20; Rebs: Mavrokefalidis 5 Asts: Wright 6

Basket Hall, Krasnodar
Attendance: 3,500
Referees: Marek Cmikiewicz (POL), Petar Obradovic (BIH), Jurgis Laurinavicius (LTU)

=== Game 6 ===
20 February 2013
18:00

Report

Cajasol Sevilla (Spain)	68–66	(Russia) BC Spartak Saint Petersburg
Scoring by quarter: 9–17, 12–18, 25–13, 22–18
Pts: Holland 23; Rebs: Balvin 8 Asts: Satoranský 5		Pts: Mavrokefalidis 19; Rebs: Dragičević 7 Asts: Strēlnieks 6

Palacio Municipal de Deportes San Pablo, Seville
Attendance: 2,500
Referees: Milija Vojinovic (SRB), Carmelo Paternico (ITA), Joseph Bissang (FRA)

20 February 2013
18:00

Report

Stelmet Zielona Góra (Poland)	94–88	(Russia) PBC Lokomotiv-Kuban
Scoring by quarter: 21–27, 17–21, 26–20, 30–20
Pts: Hodge 29; Rebs: Borovnjak 12; Asts: Hodge 10		Pts: Hendrix 20; Rebs: Hendrix 10; Asts: Calathes 11

CRS Hall Zielona Góra, Zielona Góra
Attendance: 2,553
Referees: Sinisa Herceg (CRO), Anastasios Piloidis (GRE), Sergiy Chebyshev (UKR)
