= Kirwan Inlet =

Inlet in Alexander Island, Antarctica

Kirwan Inlet (72°21′S 68°50′W) is an inlet in the southeast corner of Alexander Island, 12 nautical miles (22 km) wide at its mouth and indenting 7 nautical miles (13 km), opening on George VI Sound. The inlet is filled with ice and merges almost imperceptibly with the rising ice slopes of Alexander Island to the west. It was roughly mapped in 1949 by the Falkland Islands Dependencies Survey and was named by the UK Antarctic Place-Names Committee in honor of Laurence P. Kirwan, the Director and Secretary of the Royal Geographical Society.

== See also ==
- Fauré Inlet
- Mendelssohn Inlet
- Schubert Inlet
