= Colbert Mountains =

Mountain range on Alexander Island, Antarctica

Highest point
- Elevation: 2,095 m (6,873 ft)
- Prominence: 1,589 m (5,213 ft)
- Listing: Ultra, Ribu

The Colbert Mountains (70°35′S 70°35′W) are a group of isolated mountains with several rounded snow-covered summits, the highest at 2,095 metres (6,873 ft), overlooking Handel Ice Piedmont between Haydn Inlet and Schubert Inlet in the west central part of Alexander Island. It was first seen and photographed from a distance by Lincoln Ellsworth on his trans-Antarctic flight of November 23, 1935, and partially mapped from these photos by W.L.G. Joerg. It was resighted and photographed from the air by the United States Antarctic Service, 1939–41, and by the Ronne Antarctic Research Expedition (RARE) of 1947–1948, under Finn Ronne, who named it for R. Admiral Leo O. Colbert, head of the United States Coast and Geodetic Survey, which furnished equipment for the expedition. It was remapped in detail from RARE air photos by D. Searle of the Falkland Islands Dependencies Survey in 1960.
