= Perce =

Perce may refer to:

- Percé, Quebec, Canada, a city
  - Percé station, a closed Via Rail station
- Perce Blackborow (1896–1949), Welsh sailor, a stowaway on Ernest Shackleton's ill-fated Imperial Trans-Antarctic Expedition
- John Percy Perce Horne (1890–1990), Australian rugby league footballer
- Perce Leigh "Pat" Malone (1902–1943), American baseball player
- Percival Perce Pearce (1899–1955), American producer, director and writer
- Percival Perce Pritchard (1926-2012), Australian rugby league player
- Percival James Perce Wilson (1890–1936), American football player
- Legrand W. Perce (1836–1911), American politician

== See also ==
- Percé Rock, a large rock formation in Quebec, Canada
- Perce Point, a headland on Alexander Island, Antarctica
