= Mikko Koivisto =

Finnish basketball player (born 1987)

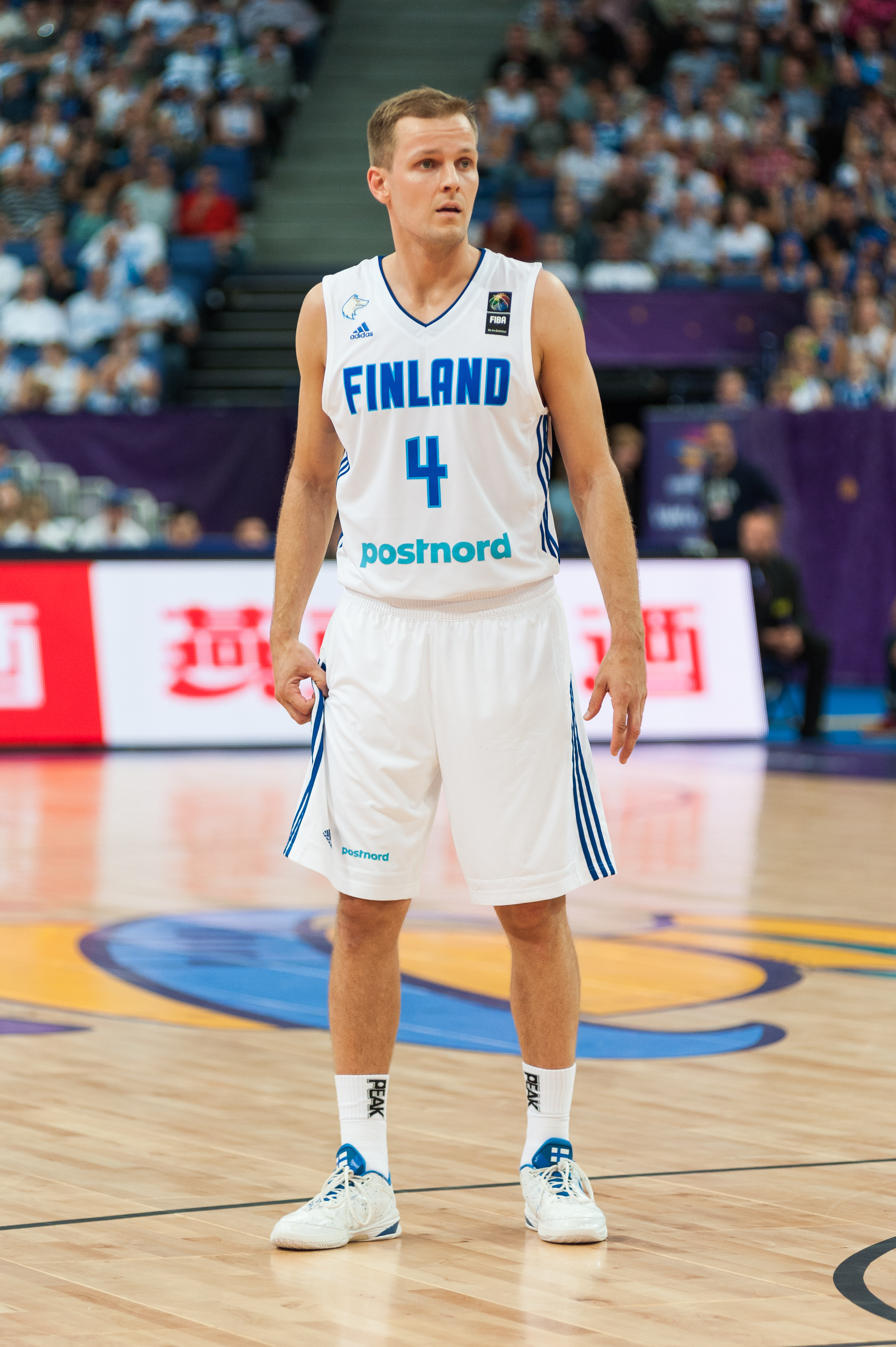
- Koivisto with Finland during EuroBasket 2017

No. 4 – Vilpas Vikings
- Position: Shooting guard
- League: Korisliiga

Personal information
- Born: April 18, 1987 (age 38); Helsinki, Finland
- Listed height: 6 ft 5 in (1.96 m)
- Listed weight: 207 lb (94 kg)

Career information
- High school: Holy Cross (Lynchburg, Virginia)
- College: UNC Greensboro (2006–2010)
- NBA draft: 2010: undrafted
- Playing career: 2003–present

Career history
- 2003–2004: Rekolan Urheilijat
- 2010–2011: Torpan Pojat
- 2011–2014: Bisons Loimaa
- 2014: Gaziantep
- 2014–2015: Skyliners Frankfurt
- 2015–2016: Kauhajoki Karhu
- 2016–present: Salon Vilpas

Mikko Koivisto (born April 18, 1987) is a Finnish basketball player. He currently plays for Salon Vilpas of the Korisliiga and for the Finnish national basketball team. In high school at Holy Cross he won the VISSA (Virginia Independent Schools Althetes Association) division 3 state championship in 05. He started his professional career in 2003–04; later he played collegiate for the UNC Greensboro Spartans for four seasons. In 2010, he returned to professional basketball again.

== Career ==
Koivisto signed with the Turkish team Royal Halı Gaziantep in February 2014.

== Honours ==
Nilan Bisons

- Korisliiga: 2011–12

Royal Halı Gaziantep

- EuroChallenge Third Place: 2014

== Career statistics ==
Legend
GP	Games played	GS	Games started	MPG	Minutes per game
FG%	Field goal percentage	3P%	3-point field goal percentage	FT%	Free throw percentage
RPG	Rebounds per game	APG	Assists per game	SPG	Steals per game
BPG	Blocks per game	PPG	Points per game	**Bold**	Career high

=== EuroCup ===
Year	Team	GP	GS	MPG	FG%	3P%	FT%	RPG	APG	SPG	BPG	PPG	PIR
2013–14	Bisons Loimaa	10	10	28.3	.463	.450	1.000	2.2	2.1	1.1	0.2	10.8	9.3

=== National team ===
Team	Tournament	Pos.	GP	PPG	RPG	APG
Finland	EuroBasket 2011	9th	8	7.5	1.1	0.9
Finland	EuroBasket 2013	9th	8	4.5	1.4	1.1
Finland	2014 FIBA World Cup	22nd	5	5.4	1.8	1.0
Finland	EuroBasket 2015	16th	6	1.2	0.7	0.5
Finland	EuroBasket 2017	11th	4	6.3	0.8	1.5
