= Handel Ice Piedmont =

Handel Ice Piedmont (70°20′S 71°0′W) is a large ice piedmont lying north and west of the Colbert Mountains, between Haydn Inlet and Schubert Inlet on the west-central coast of Alexander Island, Antarctica. Apparently first seen from the air by the United States Antarctic Service in 1940 but not separately mapped, it was first mapped from air photos taken by the Ronne Antarctic Research Expedition, 1947–48, by Searle of the Falkland Islands Dependencies Survey in 1960. The feature was named by the UK Antarctic Place-Names Committee for George Frideric Handel, the German composer.

== See also ==
- Bongrain Ice Piedmont
- Mozart Ice Piedmont
