= Pinkins =

Pinkins is a surname. Notable people with the surname include:

- Al Pinkins (born 1972), American basketball coach
- Eric Pinkins (born 1991), American football player
- Kruize Pinkins (born 1993), American basketball player
- Pollie Anne Myers Pinkins (1932–2003), American civil rights activist
- Tonya Pinkins (born 1962), American actress and filmmaker
