= Mendelssohn Inlet =

Inlet of Alexander Island

Mendelssohn Inlet (71°17′S 72°52′W) is an ice-filled inlet, 25 nautical miles (46 km) long and 9 nautical miles (17 km) wide, situated between Derocher Peninsula and Eroica Peninsula on the north side of Beethoven Peninsula, in the southwest part of Alexander Island, Antarctica. The inlet was first sighted from the air and roughly mapped by the United States Antarctic Service, 1939–41, and was resighted and photographed from the air by the Ronne Antarctic Research Expedition (RARE), 1947–48. It was remapped from the RARE photos by D. Searle of the Falkland Islands Dependencies Survey in 1960, and named by the UK Antarctic Place-Names Committee after German composer Felix Mendelssohn.

== See also ==
- Haydn Inlet
- Verdi Inlet
- Weber Inlet
