= Rossini Point =

Rossini Point (72°28′S 73°9′W) is a snow-covered point on the south coast of Alexander Island, Antarctica. This headland marks the southeast side of the entrance to the embayment occupied by Bach Ice Shelf. First seen and roughly mapped by the United States Antarctic Service (USAS), 1939–41. Remapped in greater detail from air photos obtained by the Ronne Antarctic Research Expedition (RARE), 1947–48, by Derek J.H. Searle of the Falkland Islands Dependencies Survey (FIDS) in 1960. Named by the United Kingdom Antarctic Place-Names Committee (UK-APC) for Gioacchino Rossini (1792–1868), Italian composer.

== See also ==
- Berlioz Point
- Kosar Point
- Radigan Point
