= Shostakovich Peninsula =

Peninsula in Antarctica

Coordinates: 72°11′S 71°20′W

Shostakovich Peninsula is an ice-covered peninsula lying north of Stravinsky Inlet and extending into Bach Ice Shelf in southern Alexander Island, Antarctica. The peninsula was first mapped by Directorate of Overseas Surveys from satellite imagery of Antarctica supplied by NASA in cooperation with U.S. Geological Survey. Named by United Kingdom Antarctic Place-Names Committee after Dmitri Shostakovich, Russian composer (1906–1975). Shostakovich Peninsula is one of the eight peninsulas of Alexander Island.

== See also ==
- Derocher Peninsula
- Harris Peninsula
- Pesce Peninsula
