= Britten Inlet =

Inlet in Antarctica

Britten Inlet (72°36′S 72°30′W) is an ice-filled inlet and the only inlet on Monteverdi Peninsula indenting the southwest side of the Peninsula, south Alexander Island, Antarctica. The inlet was delineated from U.S. Landsat imagery of January 1973. In association with the names of composers grouped in this area, it was named by the UK Antarctic Place-Names Committee, 1977, after Benjamin Britten, the British composer.

== See also ==
- Weber Inlet
- Haydn Inlet
- Verdi Inlet
