= Stravinsky Inlet =

Stravinsky Inlet (72°20′S 71°30′W) is an ice-covered inlet lying between Shostakovich Peninsula and Monteverdi Peninsula in southern Alexander Island, Antarctica. The inlet was first mapped by Directorate of Overseas Surveys from satellite imagery supplied by U.S. National Aeronautics and Space Administration in cooperation with U.S. Geological Survey. Named by United Kingdom Antarctic Place-Names Committee after Igor Stravinsky (1882–1971), Russian-born composer who became a French citizen, ultimately a citizen of the United States.

== See also ==
- Schubert Inlet
- Verdi Inlet
- Weber Inlet
