= Berlioz Point =

Berlioz Point (72°12′S 74°6′W) is a snow-covered headland on the south side of Beethoven Peninsula, Alexander Island, marking the northwest entrance point to the embayment occupied by Bach Ice Shelf. The south part of Alexander Island was first roughly mapped by the United States Antarctic Service in 1940, but this point was not clearly identified. It was mapped from air photos obtained by the Ronne Antarctic Research Expedition, 1947–48, by D. Searle of the Falkland Islands Dependencies Survey in 1960, and named by the UK Antarctic Place-Names Committee after the French composer Hector Berlioz.

== See also ==
- Rossini Point
- Mazza Point
- Radigan Point
