= Glazunov Glacier =

Glacier on Alexander Island, Antarctica

Glazunov Glacier (Russian: Lednik Glazunova) (72°25′00″S 71°37′00″W) is a glacier flowing north into Stravinsky Inlet from Monteverdi Peninsula, Alexander Island. The glacier was named by the USSR Academy of Sciences in 1987 after Alexander Glazunov (1865–1936), a Russian composer.
