= Pesce Peninsula =

Peninsula in Antarctica

Pesce Peninsula (71°41′S 74°57′W) is a broad snow-covered peninsula lying between Rameau Inlet and Verdi Inlet on the north side of the Beethoven Peninsula, situated in the southwest portion of Alexander Island, Antarctica. Dykeman Point is the main and only headland on Pesce Peninsula marking the northern extremity of the peninsula. Photographed from the air by Ronne Antarctic Research Expedition (RARE), 1947–48, and mapped from these photographs by D. Searle of Falkland Islands Dependencies Survey (FIDS), 1960. Named by Advisory Committee on Antarctic Names (US-ACAN) for Commander Victor L. Pesce, U.S. Navy, commanding officer, U.S. Navy Antarctic Development Squadron Six (VXE-6), from May 1980 to May 1981. Pesce Peninsula is one of the eight peninsulas of Alexander Island.

== See also ==
- Beethoven Peninsula
- Harris Peninsula
- Monteverdi Peninsula
