= Kamil Ocak Sport Hall =

Multi-purpose sport venue in Gaziantep, Turkey

Kamil Ocak Sport Hall Kamil Ocak Spor Salonu
- Interactive map of Kamil Ocak Sport Hall; Kamil Ocak Spor Salonu
- Location: Gaziantep, Turkey
- Coordinates: 37.0675°N 37.3763°E
- Capacity: 2,500

Construction
- Opened: 1969; 57 years ago

Tenant
- Royal Halı Gaziantep

Kamil Ocak Sport Hall (Turkish: Kamil Ocak Spor Salonu) is an indoor multi-purpose sport venue that is located in Gaziantep, Turkey. Opened in 1969, the hall has a seating capacity of 2,500 spectators. It is home to Royal Halı Gaziantep, which plays currently in the Turkish Basketball League.
