= Mazza Point =

Mazza Point (71°19′S 73°36′W) is a snow-covered headland lying between Brahms Inlet and Mendelssohn Inlet, marking the northwest end of Derocher Peninsula, a minor peninsula that extends to a northwest point from Beethoven Peninsula, situated in the southwest portion of Alexander Island, Antarctica. The headland was first mapped by the United States Geological Survey from U.S. Navy aerial photographs taken in 1967–68 and from U.S. Landsat imagery taken in 1972–73. It was named by the Advisory Committee on Antarctic Names for Commander Joseph D. Mazza, U.S. Navy, commanding officer of Squadron VXE-6, May 1986 to May 1987.

== See also ==
- Ablation Point
- Kosar Point
