= Weber Inlet =

Weber Inlet (71°56′S 73°28′W) is a broad ice-filled inlet, which indents the south part of the Beethoven Peninsula, lying southwest of Bennett Dome, forming the northwest arm of Bach Ice Shelf in the southwest portion of Alexander Island, Antarctica. The inlet was first mapped from air photos taken by the Ronne Antarctic Research Expedition in 1947–48, by Searle of the Falkland Islands Dependencies Survey in 1960, and named by the UK Antarctic Place-Names Committee after Carl Maria von Weber (1786–1826), a German composer.

== See also ==
- Britten Inlet
- Kirwan Inlet
- Stravinsky Inlet
