= Derocher Peninsula =

Peninsula in Antarctica

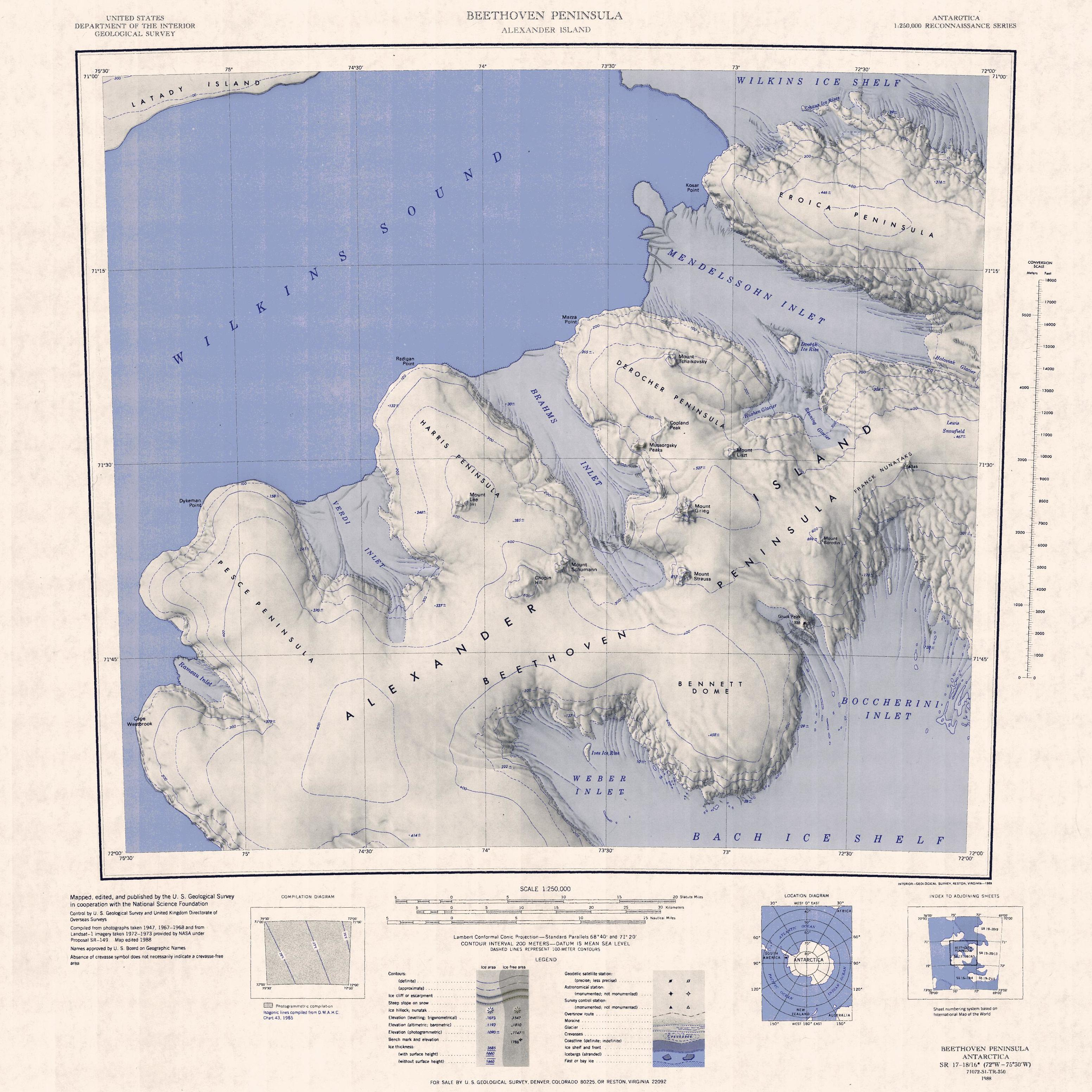
Map Beethoven Peninsula

Derocher Peninsula (71°25′S 73°20′W) is a snow-covered peninsula between Brahms Inlet and Mendelssohn Inlet on the north side of Beethoven Peninsula, Alexander Island, Antarctica. It was photographed from the air by the Ronne Antarctic Research Expedition, 1947–48, and mapped from these photographs by D. Searle of the Falkland Islands Dependencies Survey (FIDS), 1960. It was named by the Advisory Committee on Antarctic Names after Commander Paul J. Derocher, U.S. Navy, commanding officer, Antarctic Development Squadron Six (VXE-6), May 1985 to May 1986. Derocher Peninsula is one of the eight peninsulas of Alexander Island.

== See also ==
- Eroica Peninsula
- Harris Peninsula
- Pesce Peninsula
