= Kruize Pinkins =

American basketball player (born 1993)

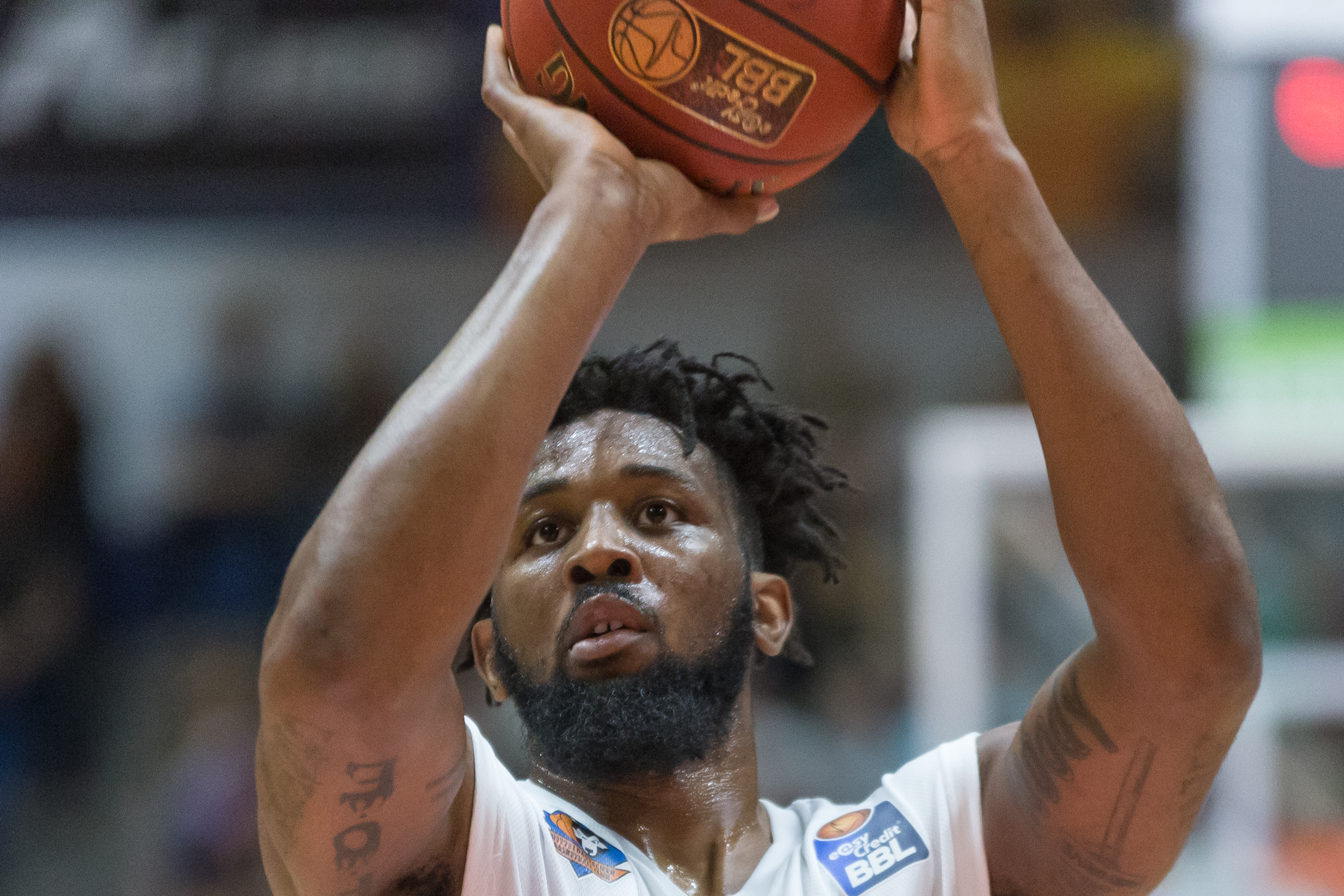
- Pinkins in 2018

Gaziantep Basketbol
- Position: Power forward
- League: TBL

Personal information
- Born: January 25, 1993 (age 33) Marianna, Florida, U.S.
- Listed height: 6 ft 8 in (2.03 m)
- Listed weight: 235 lb (107 kg)

Career information
- High school: Marianna High School
- College: Chipola College (2011–2013); San Francisco Dons (2013–2015)
- Playing career: 2015–present

Career history
- 2015–2017: White Wings Hanau
- 2017–2018: Mitteldeutscher BC
- 2018–2019: Junior Casale
- 2019–2021: Basket Torino
- 2021–2022: Limoges Cercle Saint-Pierre
- 2022–2025: Scafati Basket
- 2025–2026: Treviso Basket
- 2026: Mersin
- 2026–present: Gaziantep Basketbol

Kruize Alshaude Zah-Kee Pinkins (born January 25, 1993) is an American professional basketball player for Gaziantep Basketbol of the Türkiye Basketbol Ligi (TBL).

== High school and college career ==
Pinkins started his basketball career when he played for the team of the high school he attended, the Marianna High School. He then played in the following years, between 2011 and 2015, at the universities of Chipola College and later played in San Francisco Dons's basketball team Where he averaged 13 points and 6 rebounds through two seasons.

== Professional career ==
After playing 32 games for the French team Limoges CSP, on July 9, 2022 Pinkins signed for Scafati Basket of the Italian Lega Basket Serie A. He made his debut with the team on October 2, 2022, when he scored 11 points and got 11 rebounds in 10 minutes in a loss against Reyer Venezia. In June 2025, he moved to Treviso Basket.

On June 22, 2025, he signed with Treviso Basket of the Lega Basket Serie A (LBA).

On August 22, 2026, he signed with Mersin MSK of the Türkiye Basketbol Ligi (TBL).

On November 12, 2026, he signed with Gaziantep Basketbol of the Türkiye Basketbol Ligi (TBL).
