= Bach Ice Shelf =

Ice shelf in Antarctica

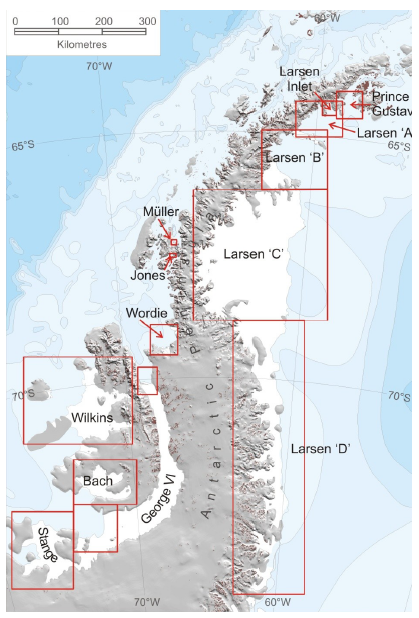
The ice shelves of the Antarctic peninsula. Bach in the lower left.

The Bach Ice Shelf (72°S 72°W) is an ice shelf which is irregular in shape and 45 miles (72 km) in extent, occupying an embayment in the south part of Alexander Island entered between Berlioz Point and Rossini Point. The ice shelf supports the south face of the Beethoven Peninsula, along with some minor extensive peninsulas and small inlets (Weber Inlet, Boccherini Inlet etc.) Bach ice shelf also supports the north side of the Monteverdi Peninsula. A minor embayment in this position first appeared on the charts of the US Antarctic Service, which explored the south part of Alexander Island by air and from the ground in 1940. The ice shelf was delineated by Derek J.H. Searle of the Falkland Islands Dependencies Survey in 1960, from air photos taken by the 1947–48 Ronne Antarctic Research Expedition. It was named by the UK Antarctic Place-Names Committee after the German composer Johann Sebastian Bach.

In a 2009 review, the Bach Ice Shelf was listed as one of 5 Antarctic peninsula Ice shelves that were not retreating. However, with the retreat of the Wilkins Ice Shelf possibly signalling a southward retreat of the limit of viability, Bach Ice Shelf may be the next to come under threat.
