= Fauré Inlet =

Fauré Inlet (72°37′S 70°48′W) is an ice-filled inlet on the south side of the Monteverdi Peninsula and is also the only inlet on the Monteverdi Peninsula in the south portion of Alexander Island, Antarctica. It was discovered and first charted by Finn Ronne and Carl Eklund of the United States Antarctic Service, 1939–1941. It was named by the UK Antarctic Place-Names Committee, 1977, in association with the names of composers grouped in this area, after Gabriel Fauré, the French composer 1845–1924.

== See also ==
- Haydn Inlet
- Verdi Inlet
- Weber Inlet
