= James White (basketball) =

American basketball player (born 1982)

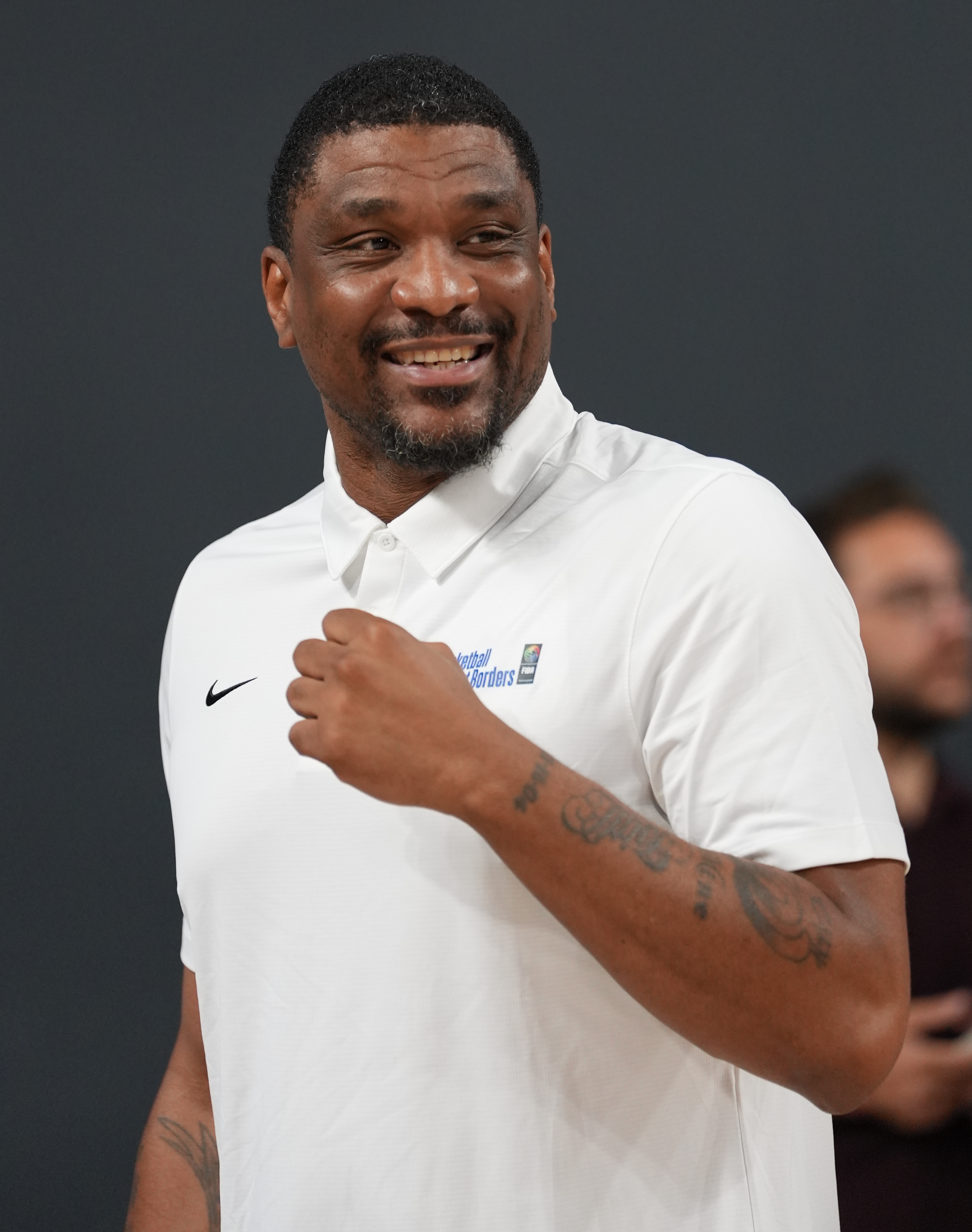
- White in 2026

Minnesota Timberwolves
- Title: Player development coach
- League: NBA

Personal information
- Born: October 21, 1982 (age 44) Washington, D.C., U.S.
- Listed height: 6 ft 7 in (2.01 m)
- Listed weight: 216 lb (98 kg)

Career information
- High school: Hargrave Military Academy (Chatham, Virginia)
- College: Florida (2001–2002); Cincinnati (2003–2006)
- NBA draft: 2006: 2nd round, 31st overall pick
- Drafted by: Portland Trail Blazers
- Playing career: 2006–2020
- Position: Small forward / power forward
- Number: 33, 8, 4
- Coaching career: 2021–present

Career history

Playing
- 2006–2007: San Antonio Spurs
- 2006–2007: →Austin Toros
- 2007–2008: Fenerbahçe
- 2008–2009: Anaheim Arsenal
- 2009: Houston Rockets
- 2009–2010: Spartak Saint Petersburg
- 2010–2011: Dinamo Sassari
- 2011–2012: Pesaro
- 2012–2013: New York Knicks
- 2013–2014: Reggiana
- 2014–2015: UNICS Kazan
- 2015–2016: Cedevita Zagreb
- 2016–2017: Petrochimi Bandar Imam
- 2017–2018: Reggiana
- 2018–2019: Benedetto Cento
- 2019–2020: Virtus Roma

Coaching
- 2021: Houston Push (assistant)
- 2022: Sugarland Imperials
- 2023–present: Minnesota Timberwolves (player development coach)

Career highlights
- NBA champion (2007); EuroChallenge champion (2014); BSL champion (2008); Croatian League champion (2016); Croatian Cup winner (2016); BSL Slam Dunk Contest champion (2008); NBA D-League All-Star (2009); All-NBA D-League Second Team (2009); PBL All-Star (2010); 3× Italian League All-Star (2011, 2012, 2014); Italian League Top Scorer (2011); McDonald's All-American (2001); Second-team Parade All-American (2001)
- Stats at NBA.com
- Stats at Basketball Reference

James William White IV (born October 21, 1982) is an American former professional basketball player and current player development coach for the Minnesota Timberwolves.

White is well known for his athleticism and ability to dunk. Since high school, his most famous dunk has been the between-the-legs dunk, with many variations. He is also known for his ability to jump from the free throw line and dunk a basketball with both hands. 'Flight' White was a runner-up in two notable dunk contests: behind future University of Florida and Golden State Warriors power forward David Lee in the 2001 McDonald's High School Slam Dunk Contest, and behind North Carolina's David Noel in the NCAA College Slam Dunk Contest during the 2006 Final Four weekend.

== College career ==
White played his freshman year at the University of Florida in the 2001–02 season helping the Gators to a 22–9 record. He saw action in all but two games, making a pair of starts and averaged 20.5 minutes of playing time. He posted averages of 6.1 points and 2.9 rebounds.

He transferred to the University of Cincinnati, and after sitting out in the 2002–03 season, he became a starter for the Bearcats in his three years with them, including his senior year when he averaged 16.3 points, 5.1 rebounds, 2 assists, 1.2 steals, and 0.9 blocks.

=== 2003–04 season ===
White made his Cincinnati debut in mid-December 2003 vs. Middle Tennessee, playing for the first time since March 2002, scoring eight points in 19 minutes of action. Tallied 14 points in the win over Miami (December 27, 2003), while also dishing out four assists. Moved into the starting lineup vs. DePaul (January 11, 2004), replacing injured Armein Kirkland, and became a fixture. Tallied 12 points, five rebounds and three assists vs. Louisville (January 21, 2004). He had 12 points and four rebounds at Wake Forest (February 15, 2004). He lettered in the spring for the C-USA champion UC track and field team. Qualified for NCAA Regionals in the high jump and triple jump. Named C-USA co-Player of the Week after averaging 14.5 points, 8.0 assists and 7.0 rebounds while shooting 69 percent from the field in a pair of UC wins (February 23–29). Scored 23 points and grabbed 11 rebounds, both then-career highs, in the win over Saint Louis (February 25, 2004), also recording seven assists, three steals and two blocked shots. He dished out nine assists at Charlotte (February 28, 2004). He scored nine points, grabbed eight rebounds and had six assists in the C-USA semifinal win over Saint Louis (March 12, 2004).

He started the final 21 games of the season and took on a larger share of the ball-handling responsibilities in the final eight contests. He became team assists leader (3.6) who averaged 4.8 assists over the final eight games. He dished out seven assists and gathered six rebounds in the NCAA Tournament opening round win over East Tennessee State (March 19, 2004).

=== 2004–05 season ===
White scored 10 points, all in the decisive game-clinching scoring run, in the season opening win over Valparaiso on November 19, 2004. He scored 18 points and grabbed eight rebounds in the win over Miami University on December 27, 2004. He tallied 15 points vs. Louisville on January 15, 2005, on 4-of-5 shooting, and also recorded eight rebounds and seven assists, while holding Louisville All-American Francisco García to seven points. He scored a career-high 25 points, on 9-of-12 shooting, and grabbed 10 rebounds in the win over Houston on January 29, 2005. He played all 40 minutes of the Charlotte game on February 5, 2005, finishing with 18 points, five rebounds and six assists. He tallied 14 points, leading UC's second-half comeback with 12 points, in the win over UAB on February 19, 2005. He scored the game-winning basket vs. Memphis on March 5, 2005 when he grabbed an offensive rebound and hit a short jumper from the baseline with 16.2 seconds to play and finished with 11 points and tied a career high with 11 rebounds. He tallied 15 points and had six rebounds in the NCAA Tournament opening round win over Iowa on March 17, 2005. He became team leader in assists (3.1) and scored in double digits 19 times.

=== 2005–06 season ===
White scored 21 points in a win over Murray State (November 19, 2005), making a steal and dunk in the final seconds of regulation to send the game into overtime. He scored 18 points on 7-of-9 shooting and had seven rebounds, and three steals in the win over Vanderbilt (December 10, 2005), sinking a career-high four treys. Rallied UC from a five-point deficit in the final two and a half minutes of the win over LSU (December 23, 2005), hitting back-to-back 3-pointers at the 2:27 and 1:51 marks and a pair of clinching free throws at 0:17. Tallied a season-high 23 points vs. North Carolina A&T (December 30, 2005), matching personal bests with four 3-point field goals and four steals. He tallied 22 points, making 4-of-6 treys, and hit a 3-pointer to put UC in the lead with 2:57 to play in the win over Providence (February 17, 2006), and also grabbing seven rebounds. He scored 17 points, going 3-of-5 from 3-point range, and had four assists vs. Seton Hall (February 28, 2006). White scored a career-high 32 points, including a career-high five three-pointers, in a narrow loss to Syracuse on March 8.

He became team scoring leader (15.9) who has reached double figures in all but four games. Topped the 1,000-point mark in career scoring with 1,209 points, 1,027 scored during his three seasons as a Bearcat to become the 44th member of UC's 1,000-point club. Leads the team in free throw percentage (.839) and is second in steals (1.1), assists (2.1), blocks (0.8) and third in rebounding (5.0). Named to the Las Vegas Holiday Classic all-tournament team after averaging 18.8 points, 6.0 rebounds, and 1.8 steals in the four wins.

== Professional career ==
=== NBA ===
He was selected in the second round (31st overall) by the Portland Trail Blazers in the 2006 NBA draft, and his rights were immediately traded to the Indiana Pacers for the rights to the Pacers' pick at No. 45 overall (Alexander Johnson), and second-round draft choices in 2007 and 2008. In eight preseason games with Indiana, White averaged 3.8 points and 2.0 rebounds in 17.5 minutes a game over 8 preseason games. He was cut by the Indiana Pacers on October 31, 2006, with coach Rick Carlisle saying his release was the most difficult cut he has been involved with in his coaching career. White signed a two-year contract with the San Antonio Spurs on November 3, 2006.

On December 16, 2006, the Spurs assigned White to play in their NBA Development League affiliated team the Austin Toros. He was recalled on December 26, but reassigned to Austin three days later. Spurs coach Gregg Popovich stated that the reason for the move was that the in-season schedule does not allow much time to practice and the veteran-heavy team does not allow any spare minutes for White. He continued to receive his salary from the Spurs while playing for the Toros. Toros coach Dennis Johnson stated that White received regular playing time. After playing in 15 games (with 11 starts), and averaging 16.3 points, 4.0 rebounds, 3.1 assists and 1.67 steals in 34.4 minutes, White was recalled by the Spurs for the second time on January 27, 2007. He had hitherto not seen any playing time with the Spurs.

On March 26, White made his NBA debut with the Spurs against the Golden State Warriors, scoring 9 points and grabbing 3 rebounds in 14 minutes during his first game. White also got the first NBA start of his career on April 16, 2007, in a loss against the Memphis Grizzlies. In a game where the Spurs rested their regular lineup due to the playoff standings already having been decided, White responded by scoring a career-high 17 points in 39 minutes of play in a 101–91 loss to the Grizzlies. He averaged 8.2 PPG in 6 games for the Spurs. He was waived during the off-season by the Spurs on July 23, 2007 and received an NBA championship ring.

=== Europe ===
On September 8, 2007, White joined Will Solomon when he signed a four-year contract with the Turkish Basketball League club Fenerbahçe who played in the 2007–08 Euroleague quarter finals. On March 22, 2008, White won the Turkish dunk contest against Curtis Withers, Quinton Hosley, and Richard Chaney in the Beko Allstar Slam Dunk Contest with his raceway dunk.

=== Return to the NBA ===
He was playing with the Anaheim Arsenal in the NBA's D-League when he signed a 10-day contract with the Houston Rockets on March 3, 2009, and then a second 10-day contract before signing a multi-year deal with the Rockets on March 24, 2009. He was deactivated April 7 to make room for forward Carl Landry, who had recovered from a gunshot wound. On September 2, 2009, White was drafted in the first round of the NBA Development League expansion draft by the Maine Red Claws.

In September 2009, the Rockets traded White to the Denver Nuggets in exchange for the draft rights to Axel Hervelle. His first game with the Nuggets was on October 1, 2009, facing Utah. He scored 13 points, 10 of them from free throws. He was waived by the Nuggets on October 21, 2009.

=== Return to Europe ===
He signed a contract with Spartak St. Petersburg of the Russian Super League on November 10, 2009. In 2010, he joined the Italian team Dinamo Sassari in Lega Basket Serie A where he was the 2010–11 Italian League top scorer, averaging 20.2 points in 34 games. In August 2011, he signed a one-year contract with Scavolini Pesaro.

=== Second return to NBA ===
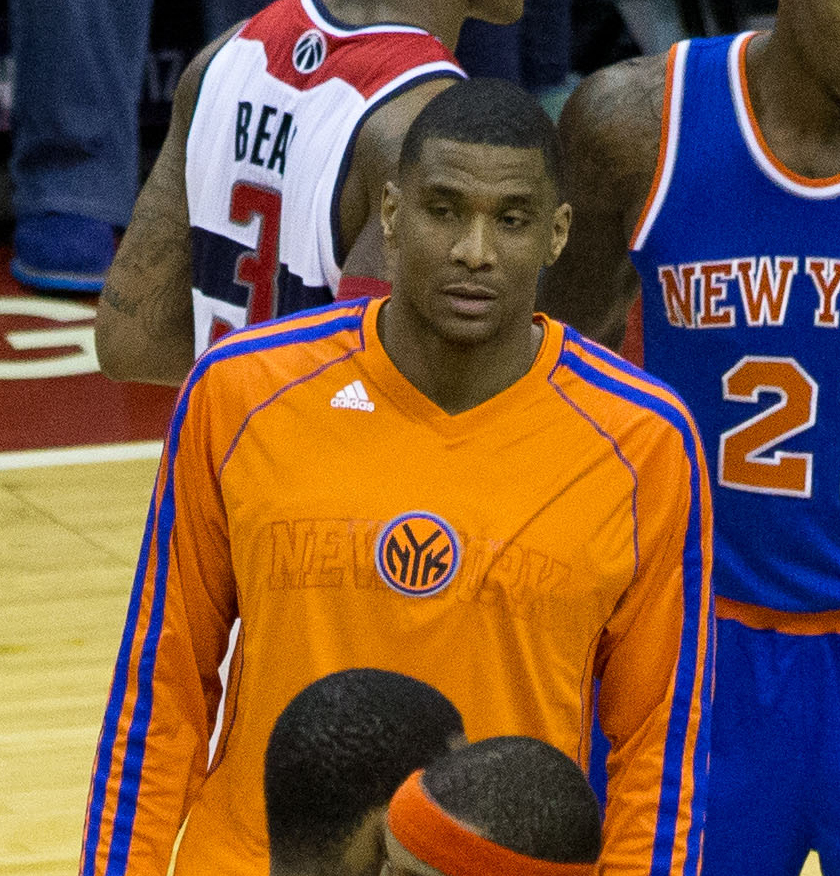
White with the New York Knicks in 2013

On July 11, 2012, White signed a two-year deal with the New York Knicks for the veteran's minimum.

White played with the New York Knicks' Summer League Team in Las Vegas, Nevada, in the summer of 2012. White averaged 6.3 points per game, 4.3 rebounds per game, and 3.3 assists per game.

On December 18, 2012, he was assigned to the Erie BayHawks of the NBA D-League. He was recalled on December 19, reassigned on December 20, and recalled again on December 21.

On February 7, 2013, it was announced that White would represent the Knicks in the slam dunk contest at the 2013 NBA All-Star Game in Houston. He also scored a career high 20 points that year.

On June 30, 2013, White was waived by the Knicks.

=== Return to Europe ===
On September 19, 2013, he returned to Italy and signed a one-year deal with Grissin Bon Reggio Emilia. During the season with Grissin Bon Reggio Emilia he averaged 17.1 points and 5 rebounds in 34 Italian League games and also helped his team to win the EuroChallenge title.

On August 7, 2014, he signed a one-year deal with UNICS Kazan of Russia.

On July 30, 2015, he signed with Cedevita Zagreb of Croatia for the 2015–16 season.

=== Iran ===
In August 2016, White signed with Petrochimi Bandar Imam of the Iranian Basketball Super League.

=== BIG3 ===
In the summer of 2017, James White joined Trilogy of the BIG3 league together with Al Harrington, Rashad McCants, and Kenyon Martin.

Trilogy went undefeated throughout the inaugural season and won the first ever BIG3 championship. White also won the defensive player of the year award.

White was a member of Trilogy when they won the 2021 BIG3 Championship, making him the first two-time BIG 3 Champion either as a player or coach.

As of May 2022, White is still playing with Trilogy while also fulfilling the team captain role.

== Coaching career ==
On September 11, 2025, the Minnesota Timberwolves promoted White to the role of assistant coach/player development.

== Career statistics ==
Legend
GP	Games played	GS	Games started	MPG	Minutes per game
FG%	Field goal percentage	3P%	3-point field goal percentage	FT%	Free throw percentage
RPG	Rebounds per game	APG	Assists per game	SPG	Steals per game
BPG	Blocks per game	PPG	Points per game	**Bold**	Career high
†	Won an NBA championship

=== NBA ===
==== Regular season ====
Year	Team	GP	GS	MPG	FG%	3P%	FT%	RPG	APG	SPG	BPG	PPG
2006–07†	San Antonio	6	2	**22.8**	.439	.286	**.800**	**3.3**	**.8**	**.5**	.2	**8.3**
2008–09	Houston	4	0	2.8	**.600**	**.500**	.000	.0	.3	.3	**.3**	1.8
2012–13	New York	**57**	**16**	7.6	.431	.341	.579	.8	.5	.2	.1	2.2
Career		67	18	8.7	.438	.340	.676	1.0	.5	.3	.1	2.7

==== Playoffs ====
Year	Team	GP	GS	MPG	FG%	3P%	FT%	RPG	APG	SPG	BPG	PPG
2009	Houston	**5**	0	**2.4**	.333	**.500**	.000	.2	.0	.0	.0	**1.4**
2013	New York	4	0	2.3	**.500**	.000	.000	**.5**	.0	.0	.0	1.0
Career		9	0	2.3	.385	.250	.000	.3	.0	.0	.0	1.2

=== EuroLeague ===
Year	Team	GP	GS	MPG	FG%	3P%	FT%	RPG	APG	SPG	BPG	PPG	PIR
2007–08	Fenerbahçe	**21**	**11**	19.7	**.515**	**.371**	.765	2.9	**1.0**	.6	.2	6.8	7.0
2014–15	UNICS	10	9	**27.8**	.467	.320	**.846**	**4.9**	.7	**.7**	**.3**	**10.0**	**10.5**
Career		31	20	22.3	.494	.350	.800	3.5	.9	.6	.2	7.8	8.2
