= Kosar Point =

Kosar Point (71°8′S 73°7′W) is a snow-covered headland forming the westernmost extremity of the Eroica Peninsula, situated in the southwest portion of Alexander Island, Antarctica. it was photographed from the air by the Ronne Antarctic Research Expedition in 1947 and mapped from these photographs by the Falkland Islands Dependencies Survey in 1960. It was mapped by the United States Geological Survey from U.S. Navy aerial photographs taken 1967–68 and from Landsat imagery taken 1972–73. The point was named by the Advisory Committee on Antarctic Names for Commander William S. Kosar Jr., U.S. Navy, assigned to the Division of Polar Programs, National Science Foundation, as aviation projects officer, 1975–77. He was instrumental in modifying LC-130 aircraft to provide longer range in support of extensive radio echo sounding missions.

== See also ==
- Ablation Point
- Mazza Point
- Triton Point
