= Anton Glazunov =

Russian basketball player

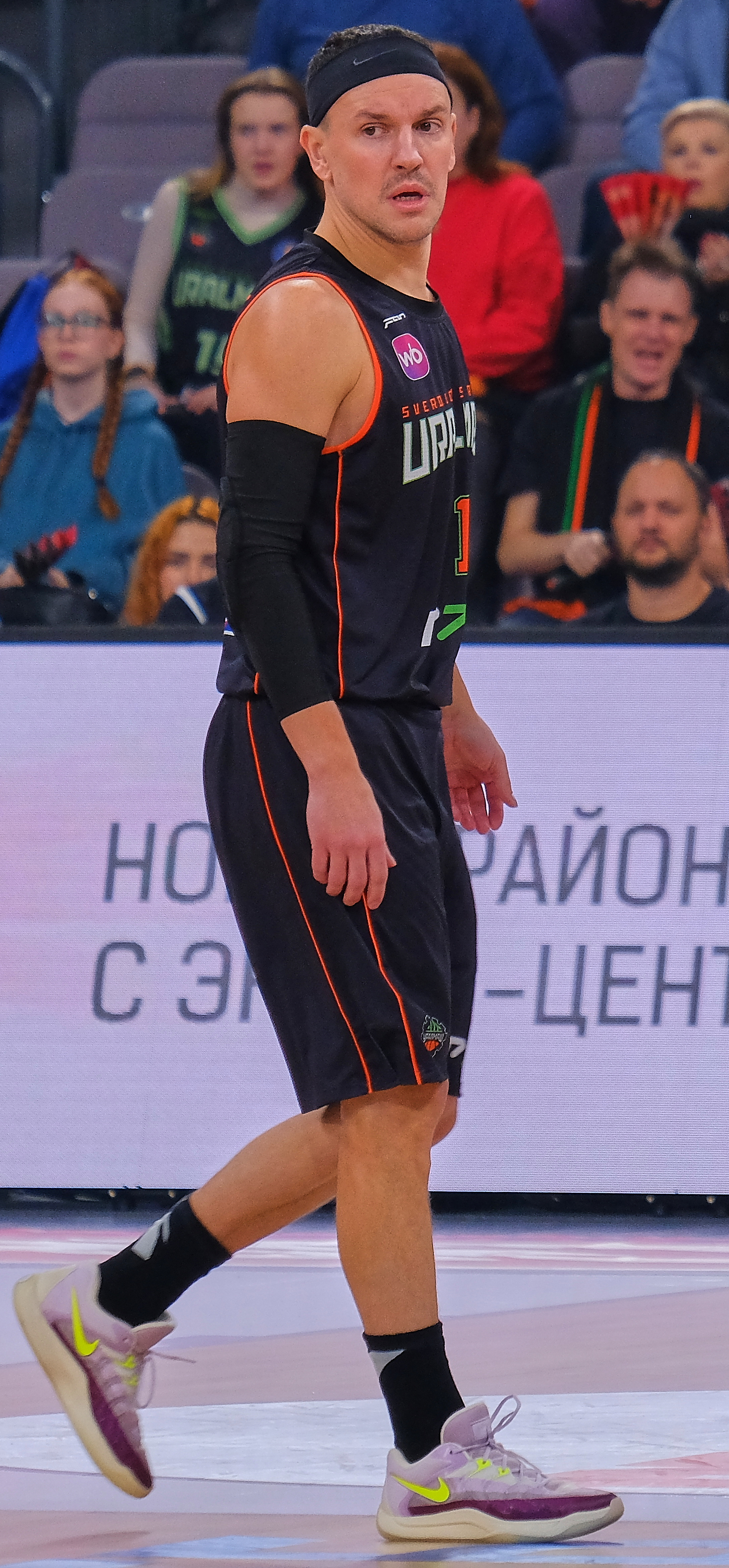
- Glazunov with BC Uralmash in 2024

No. 1 – Uralmash Yekaterinburg
- Position: Point guard
- League: VTB United League

Personal information
- Born: August 25, 1986 (age 40) Kuibyshev, Russia
- Listed height: 5 ft 11 in (1.80 m)
- Listed weight: 170 lb (77 kg)

Career information
- Playing career: 2003–present

Career history
- 2003–2007: CSK VVS Samara
- 2008–2009: Metallurg Magnitogorsk
- 2009–2010: Dynamo Moscow
- 2010–2014: Ural Yekaterinburg
- 2014–2015: Avtodor Saratov
- 2015: Krasnye Krylia
- 2015–2017: Temp-SUMZ-UGMK Revda
- 2017–2018: Ural Yekaterinburg
- 2018–2021: CSK VVS Samara
- 2021–2024: Uralmash Yekaterinburg
- 2025–present: Metallurg Magnitogorsk

Anton Glazunov (born August 25, 1986) is a Russian professional basketball player who currently plays for Uralmash Yekaterinburg of the VTB United League.

== Honors ==
CSK VVS Samara

- FIBA EuroCup Challenge (1): 2007

BC Ural Yekaterinburg

- Russian Basketball Super League (2): 2012, 2013
