= Gaziantep Basketbol =

Turkish basketball team

- Leagues: TBL
- Founded: 2007; 19 years ago
- History: Gaziantep BB (2007–2013); Gaziantep Basketbol (2013–present)
- Arena: Karataş Şahinbey Sport Hall; Kamil Ocak Sport Hall
- Capacity: 6,400; 2,500
- Location: Gaziantep, Turkey
- Team colors: Red, black
- President: Metin Uzer
- Head coach: Şemsettin Baş
- Website: Official website
Home	Away

Gaziantep Basketbol is a professional basketball team based in the city of Gaziantep in Turkey that plays in the Turkish Basketball First League (TBL). Their home arena is the Karataş Şahinbey Sport Hall with a capacity of 6,400 seats.

== History ==
The team was founded in 2007. In 2011 the club promoted to the Second Division. In the 2011–12 season, the team promoted to the top tier TBL. In 2012, Royal Halı (a Turkish carpet producer) became head sponsor of the team and the team was re-named to Royal Halı Gaziantep. After the 2015–16 season, the team had financial problems after Royal Halı withdrew and was forced to leave the top tier. After all, the team was able to stay alive and play in the TBL.

== Honours ==
- EuroChallenge:
  - Third (1): 2013–14

== Logos ==
The Royal Halı Gaziantep logo (2012–2016)

Gaziantep Basketbol logo (2016–present)

== Season by season ==
Season	Tier	League	Pos.	Turkish Cup	European competitions	
2009–10	3	EBBL	1st			
2010–11	2	TB2L	3rd			
2011–12	2	TB2L	2nd			
2012–13	1	TBL	9th	Group stage		
2013–14	1	TBL	10th	Group stage	3 EuroChallenge	3rd
2014–15	1	TBL	10th	Quarterfinalist		
2015–16	1	BSL	8th		3 FIBA Europe Cup	R16
2016–17	1	BSL	7th		4 FIBA Europe Cup	R16
2017–18	1	BSL	14th		3 Champions League	RS
2018–19	1	BSL	5th	Quarterfinalist		
2019–20	1	BSL	–^{1}		2 Champions League	–^{1}
2020–21	1	BSL	8th			
2021–22	1	BSL	5th	Quarterfinalist		
2022–23	1	BSL	15th		4 FIBA Europe Cup	QF
2023–24	2	TBL	4th			
2024–25	2	TBL	7th			

^1 Cancelled due to the COVID-19 pandemic in Europe.

== Players ==
=== Current roster ===
Note: Flags indicate national team eligibility at FIBA-sanctioned events. Players may hold other non-FIBA nationalities not displayed.

Gaziantep Basketbol roster
Players
Coaches

Pos.	No.	Nat.	Name	Ht.	Wt.	Age
SG	0	(Turkey)	Coşkun, Sarp	1.93 m (6 ft 4 in)		19 – 23 April 2007
G	1	(Turkey)	Yılmaz, İbrahim	1.93 m (6 ft 4 in)		21 – 10 March 2005
PG	3	(Turkey)	Al, Ömer Utku	1.83 m (6 ft 0 in)		28 – 3 February 1998
PF	4	(Turkey)	Geyik, Samet	2.06 m (6 ft 9 in)		33 – 12 January 1993
PG	5	(Turkey)	İlter, Erdem	1.88 m (6 ft 2 in)		36 – 15 October 1990
F	9	(Turkey)	Yücedağ, Utku	1.98 m (6 ft 6 in)		32 – 9 May 1994
PG	10	(Turkey)	Turna, Yiğitcan	1.88 m (6 ft 2 in)		39 – 7 March 1987
PG	11	(United States)	Smith, Scoochie	1.88 m (6 ft 2 in)		32 – 11 November 1994
G/F	15	(United States)	Gulley, Jarmar	1.96 m (6 ft 5 in)		35 – 12 March 1991
PF	23	(Turkey)	Alemdaroğlu, Mehmet	2.03 m (6 ft 8 in)		30 – 24 July 1996
C	24	(Turkey)	Tanışan, Emre	2.06 m (6 ft 9 in)		27 – 19 May 1999
SG	33	(Turkey)	Karahan, Alp	1.93 m (6 ft 4 in)		28 – 20 July 1998
PF	35	(Turkey)	Celep, Mert	2.06 m (6 ft 9 in)		31 – 23 July 1995
PF		(United States)	Pinkins, Kruize	2.03 m (6 ft 8 in)		33 – 25 January 1993

Head coach

- (Turkey) Sinan Çelik

Assistant coach(es)

- (Turkey) Abdullah Fırat Çolak
- (Turkey) Şemsettin Baş

Legend

- (C) Team captain
- (DC) Dual citizenship
- Injured

- Roster
Updated: November 13, 2026

== Notable players ==
Note: Flags indicate national team eligibility at FIBA-sanctioned events. Players may hold other non-FIBA nationalities not displayed.

Criteria

To appear in this section a player must have either:

- Set a club record or won an individual award while at the club
- Played at least one official international match for their national team at any time
- Played at least one official NBA match at any time.

- (Turkey) Serkan Erdoğan
- (Turkey) Barış Ermiş
- (Croatia) Tomislav Ružić
- (Cyprus) Anthony King
- (Finland) Mikko Koivisto
- (France) Mouhammadou Jaiteh
- (Guinea) Alpha Kaba
- (Slovenia) Jaka Lakovič
- (Slovenia) Domen Lorbek
- (Serbia) Dejan Borovnjak
- (Serbia) Oliver Stević
- (United States) Joey Dorsey
- (United States) / (Bulgaria) Earl Calloway
- (United States) / (Bosnia and Herzegovina) J.R. Bremer
- (United States) Dylan Page
- (United States) Cory Higgins
- (United States) Isaiah Swann
- (United States) Terrico White
