= Demonte Harper =

American basketball player (born 1989)

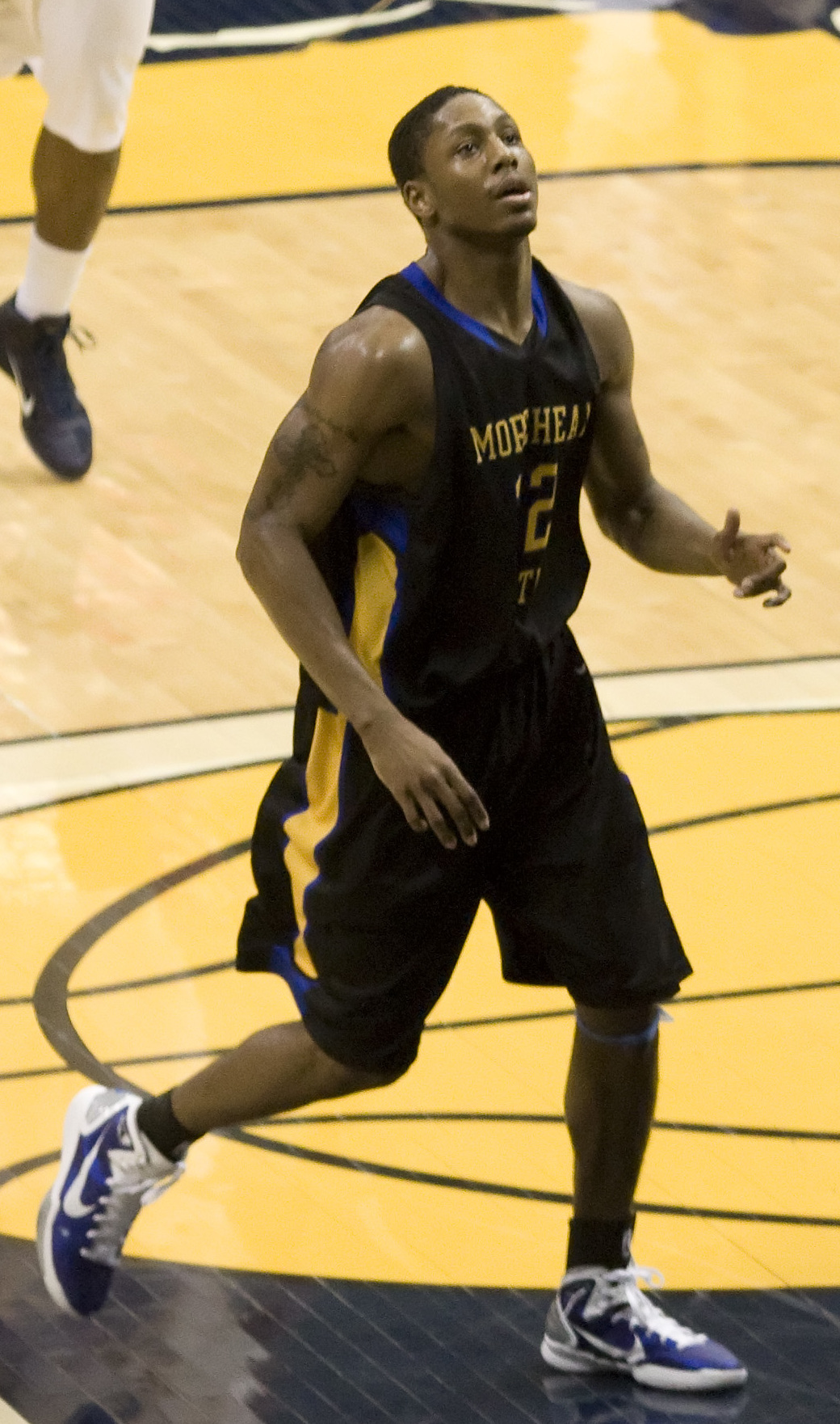
- Harper playing for Morehead State

No. 22 – Élan Chalon
- Position: Shooting guard
- League: LNB Pro A

Personal information
- Born: June 21, 1989 (age 37) Nashville, Tennessee
- Listed height: 6 ft 4 in (1.93 m)
- Listed weight: 195 lb (88 kg)

Career information
- High school: Whites Creek (Whites Creek, Tennessee)
- College: Morehead State (2007–2011)
- NBA draft: 2011: undrafted
- Playing career: 2011–present

Career history
- 2011–2012: Cibona
- 2012–2013: Erie BayHawks
- 2013–2014: Tsmoki-Minsk
- 2014–2015: New Basket Brindisi
- 2015–2016: Czarni Słupsk
- 2016–2017: BC Kalev
- 2017–2018: Zenit Saint Petersburg
- 2018: Tofaş
- 2019: Sidigas Avellino
- 2019–2021: Gran Canaria
- 2021–2022: Limoges CSP
- 2022–2023: Derthona Basket
- 2023: Ironi Ness Ziona
- 2023–present: Élan Chalon

Demonte Tyrone Harper (born June 21, 1989) is an American professional basketball player for Élan Chalon of the LNB Pro A. He played college basketball at Morehead State University.

== High school career ==
Harper attended Whites Creek High School in Whites Creek, Tennessee. Harper went to the AAA State Final Four both his junior and senior years. As a senior, he averaged 15 points and 8 rebounds per game. After his senior year season in 2007, Harper was awarded All-District First Team and All-Region First Team.

== College career ==
Harper played his college basketball career at Morehead State University in the Ohio Valley Conference (OVC).

In 2009 he averaged 3.4 assists per game (10th in the OVC). He was awarded OVC All-Tournament Team in 2009. In 2010 he averaged 3.2 assists pre game (10th), and 1.4 steals per game (7th).

In 2011 he averaged 15.5 points per game (5th in the OVC), 3.4 assists per game (6th), and 1.5 steals per game (8th), with a .431 field goal percentage (7th). In 2011, he was awarded All-OVC First Team, OVC Tournament MVP, and OVC All-Tournament Team after making a three-point shot with 4.2 seconds left for a 62–61 victory over No. 4 Louisville, which was the first big upset of the 2011 NCAA Tournament. Harper was invited to play in the 2011 NCAA Portsmouth Invitational Tournament.

Harper finished his MSU career in 2010–11 by being named to the Lou Henson All-America Team and the National Association of Basketball Coaches All-District 19 Team. He concluded his collegiate career with 1,436 points, placing him 13th all-time at Morehead State University.

=== College statistics ===
| Year | Team | GP | GS | MPG | FG% | 3P% | FT% | RPG | APG | SPG | BPG | PPG |
|---|---|---|---|---|---|---|---|---|---|---|---|---|
| 2007–08 | Morehead State | 30 | 2 | 19.2 | .359 | .351 | .600 | 2.2 | 1.6 | .7 | .1 | 3.7 |
| 2008–09 | Morehead State | 36 | 35 | 32.5 | .375 | .336 | .767 | 4.1 | 3.5 | 1.2 | .7 | 10.6 |
| 2009–10 | Morehead State | 34 | 30 | 29.9 | .419 | .363 | .719 | 2.9 | 3.2 | 1.4 | .2 | 11.9 |
| 2010–11 | Morehead State | 35 | 35 | 33.7 | .431 | .373 | .669 | 5.0 | 3.4 | 1.5 | .3 | 15.5 |
| Career | | 135 | 102 | 29.2 | .406 | .358 | .704 | 3.6 | 3.0 | 1.2 | .3 | 10.6 |

=== NCAA Special Events statistics ===
| Year | Event | GP | MPG | FG% | 3P% | FT% | RPG | APG | SPG | BPG | PPG |
|---|---|---|---|---|---|---|---|---|---|---|---|
| 2011 | Portsmouth Invitational Tournament | 3 | 27.3 | .314 | .214 | 1.000 | 3 | 3.7 | 2.0 | 0.0 | 8.7 |

== Professional career ==
Harper went undrafted in the 2011 NBA draft, making him an unrestricted free agent.

In July 2012, Harper landed a spot on the Denver Nuggets NBA Summer League team in Las Vegas, Nevada. Harper averaged 5 points per game. His highest scoring game was 17 points against the Portland Trail Blazers, along with 5 assists and 5 defensive rebounds.

In September 2012, he signed a contract with the Portland Trail Blazers, which was put on waivers in October 2012.

The Reno Bighorns selected Harper in Round 2 with Pick 5 in the 2012 Annual NBA Development League Draft. On November 5, 2012, Harper was acquired from Reno in a trade by the Erie BayHawks.

In September 2013, Harper signed with BC Tsmoki-Minsk of Belarus. In preseason action for Tsmoki-Minsk, Harper scored 17 points in a 94–88 win over Budivelnyk.

In July 2014, he was added to the Denver Nuggets NBA Summer League team's roster. Harper scored 7 points in less than 7 minutes against the NBA D-League Select team. Against the Los Angeles Lakers, Harper's defense was irreplaceable as he played over 28 minutes, scoring 8 points, 4 rebounds, 1 assist, 1 steal, and 1 blocked shot.

In August 2014, Harper signed with Enel Brindisi, also known as New Basket Brindisi, in Brindisi, Italy.

On July 27, 2015, he signed with Czarni Słupsk of the Polish Basketball League.

On September 2, 2016, Harper signed with Estonian club Kalev/Cramo for the 2016–17 season.

On March 14, 2017, it was announced that Harper moved to B.C. Zenit Saint Petersburg. He averaged 10.6 points per game. On July 7, 2018, Harper signed with the Turkish team Tofaş.

On January 25, 2019, he signed with Sidigas Avellino of the Italian Lega Basket Serie A (LBA). On July 26, 2019, Harper signed a one-year deal with Spanish club Herbalife Gran Canaria. He re-signed the following season and averaged 12.9 points per game.

On July 29, 2021, Harper signed with Limoges CSP of the LNB Pro A. He averaged 15.7 points per game (8th in the league).

On July 3, 2022, he signed with Derthona Basket of the Italian LBA.

On August 17, 2023, Harper signed with Ironi Ness Ziona of the Israeli Basketball Premier League.

== Career statistics ==
Legend
| GP | Games played | GS | Games started | MPG | Minutes per game |
| FG% | Field goal percentage | 3P% | 3-point field goal percentage | FT% | Free throw percentage |
| RPG | Rebounds per game | APG | Assists per game | SPG | Steals per game |
| BPG | Blocks per game | PPG | Points per game | **Bold** | Career high |

=== NBA D-League ===
| Team | Year | GP | MPG | FG% | 3P% | FT% | RPG | APG | SPG | BPG | PPG |
|---|---|---|---|---|---|---|---|---|---|---|---|
| Erie Bayhawks | 2012–13 | 50 | 22.5 | .387 | .351 | .680 | 2.5 | 2.1 | 0.8 | 0.2 | 9.0 |

=== Belarusian Premier League ===
| Team | Year | GP | MPG | FG% | 3P% | FT% | RPG | APG | SPG | BPG | PPG | EFF |
|---|---|---|---|---|---|---|---|---|---|---|---|---|
| BC Tsmoki-Minsk | 2013–14 | 13 | 24.5 | .514 | .431 | .692 | 4.3 | 3.8 | 1.6 | .0 | 12.8 | 12.4 |

=== EuroChallenge ===
| Team | Year | GP | MPG | FG% | 3P% | FT% | RPG | APG | SPG | BPG | PPG | EFF |
|---|---|---|---|---|---|---|---|---|---|---|---|---|
| BC Tsmoki-Minsk | 2013–14 | 14 | 29.2 | .505 | .351 | .643 | 5.9 | 1.9 | 1.8 | 0.1 | 13.2 | 11.2 |

=== VTB United League ===
| Team | Year | GP | MPG | FG% | 3P% | FT% | RPG | APG | SPG | BPG | PPG | EFF |
|---|---|---|---|---|---|---|---|---|---|---|---|---|
| BC Tsmoki-Minsk | 2013–14 | 17 | 29.2 | .421 | .346 | .636 | 4.2 | 3.1 | 1.2 | 0.1 | 10.1 | 7.1 |
