= Schubert Inlet =

Inlet in Antarctica

Schubert Inlet (70°52′S 70°55′W) is an ice-filled inlet in Antarctica.

== Description ==
Schubert Inlet is 14 nautical miles (16 mi; 26 km) long and 5 nautical miles (5.8 mi; 9.3 km) wide, indenting the west coast of Alexander Island, lying between the Colbert Mountains north of the inlet and the Walton Mountains south of the inlet. The inlet receives ice flowing into it throughout the whole year, mainly because the inlet is adjacent to the Wilkins Ice Shelf, which lies immediately west.

The inlet was first mapped from air photos taken by the Ronne Antarctic Research Expedition in 1947–48, by Searle of the Falkland Islands Dependencies Survey in 1960. It was named by the United Kingdom Antarctic Place-Names Committee for Franz Schubert (1797–1828), Austrian composer.

== See also ==
- Britten Inlet
- Haydn Inlet
- Stravinsky Inlet
