= Haydn Inlet =

Inlet in Alexander Island, Antarctica

Haydn Inlet (70°13′S 70°45′W) is an ice-filled inlet indenting the west coast of Alexander Island, Antarctica, lying between Mozart Ice Piedmont and Handel Ice Piedmont. Schubert Inlet lies to the south and the Lassus Mountains are immediately north. Haydn Inlet is 27 nautical miles (50 km) long and 12 nautical miles (22 km) wide at the mouth, narrowing toward the head. It was first seen from the air and roughly mapped by the United States Antarctic Service, 1939–41. It was resighted from the air and photographed by the Ronne Antarctic Research Expedition, 1947–48, and remapped from these photos by D. Searle of the Falkland Islands Dependencies Survey in 1960. The inlet was named by the UK Antarctic Place-Names Committee for Joseph Haydn, the Austrian composer.

== See also ==
- Fauré Inlet
- Verdi Inlet
- Weber Inlet
