= BC Ural Yekaterinburg =

Russian basketball club from Yekaterinburg

Ural Yekaterinburg
- Founded: 2006
- Dissolved: 2020
- Arena: Palace of Sporting Games (DIVS)
- Capacity: 5,000
- Location: Yekaterinburg, Russia
- Team colors: Gold, Red
- Championships: 2 (2012, 2013)
- Website: bcural.ru
Home	Away

Ural Yekaterinburg was a Russian professional basketball team that played in the Russian Basketball Super League. They won Super League championships in 2012 and 2013.

== History ==
The team has history that stems back to the 1940s.

Between the 2010–11 and 2019–20 seasons, Ural Yekaterinburg played in the Russian Basketball Super League. They won championships in 2012 and 2013. In the 2013–14 season, the team played in the EuroChallenge, where they reached the quarter-finals.

In July 2020, the team withdrew from the 2020–21 season due to the COVID-19 pandemic.

== Trophies ==
- Russian Basketball Super League (2):

2011–12, 2012–13

== Season by season ==
Season	Tier	League	Pos.	Russian Cup	European competitions	
2011–12	2	Super League	1st	Semifinalist		
2012–13	2	Super League	1st		3 EuroChallenge	QR
2013–14	2	Super League	2nd		3 EuroChallenge	QF
2014–15	2	Super League 1	4th			
2015–16	2	Super League 1	9th			
2016–17	2	Super League 1	9th			
