= Dejan Borovnjak =

Serbian basketball player

Personal information
- Born: April 1, 1986 (age 40) Knin, SR Croatia, SFR Yugoslavia
- Listed height: 6 ft 10.25 in (2.09 m)
- Listed weight: 230 lb (104 kg)

Career information
- NBA draft: 2008: undrafted
- Playing career: 2004–2022
- Position: Power forward / center

Career history
- 2004–2008: Partizan
- 2008–2009: Vojvodina Srbijagas
- 2009–2010: Lietuvos rytas
- 2010: →Panionios
- 2010–2011: Aris
- 2011: Gran Canaria
- 2011–2012: New Basket Brindisi
- 2012: K.A.O.D.
- 2012–2013: Stelmet Zielona Góra
- 2013–2014: Royal Halı Gaziantep
- 2014–2015: Zenit Saint Petersburg
- 2015–2016: Stelmet Zielona Góra
- 2016–2019: Bursaspor
- 2019–2021: CSO Voluntari
- 2021: Zlatibor
- 2021–2022: Antalya

Career highlights
- Turkish Basketball First League champion (2019); 2× Adriatic League champion (2007, 2008); 2× Serbian League champion (2007, 2008); 2× Serbia and Montenegro League champion (2005, 2006); Serbian Cup winner (2008); Polish League champion (2013); All-Polish League Team (2016)

Dejan Borovnjak (born April 1, 1986) is a Serbian former professional basketball player.

== Professional career ==
Borovnjak began his professional career in 2004 with Partizan Belgrade. In the summer of 2008, he moved to Vojvodina Srbijagas. In May 2009, he parted ways with Vojvodina.

On May 28, 2009, he signed with Lietuvos rytas of Lithuania. In January 2010, he was loaned to the Greek team Panionios for the rest of the season. On July 20, 2010, he signed a one-year deal with another Greek team Aris. In March 2011, he moved to Spain and signed with CB Gran Canaria for the remainder of the season.

On July 28, 2011, he signed a one-year deal with New Basket Brindisi of the Italian Legadue Basket. He was one of the key players for Brindisi to reach the promotion in Serie A. In July 2012, he extended his contract with Brindisi for one more season. In August 2012, club decided to release him, because he underwent surgery and won't be able to play for several weeks.

On November 21, 2012, he signed a one-month deal with K.A.O.D. of Greece. On December 26, 2012, he signed with Stelmet Zielona Góra of Poland for the rest of the season. With them he won the Polish Basketball League in the 2012–13 season. That was the first championship in the history of Zielona Góra.

On June 13, 2013, he signed a one-year deal with Royal Halı Gaziantep of the Turkish Basketball League.

On July 16, 2014, he signed with Triumph Lyubertsy of Russia. After the deal the team moved to Saint Petersburg, so Borovnjak became a Zenit player. On July 22, 2015, he parted ways with Zenit.

On August 13, 2015, he returned to Stelmet Zielona Góra for the 2015–16 season.

On July 2, 2016, he signed a one-year contract with Turkish club Bursaspor. On June 16, 2017, he signed a two-year contract extension with Bursaspor.

On September 5, 2019, he has signed with CSO Voluntari of the Liga Națională.
