= Oliver Stević =

Serbian basketball player

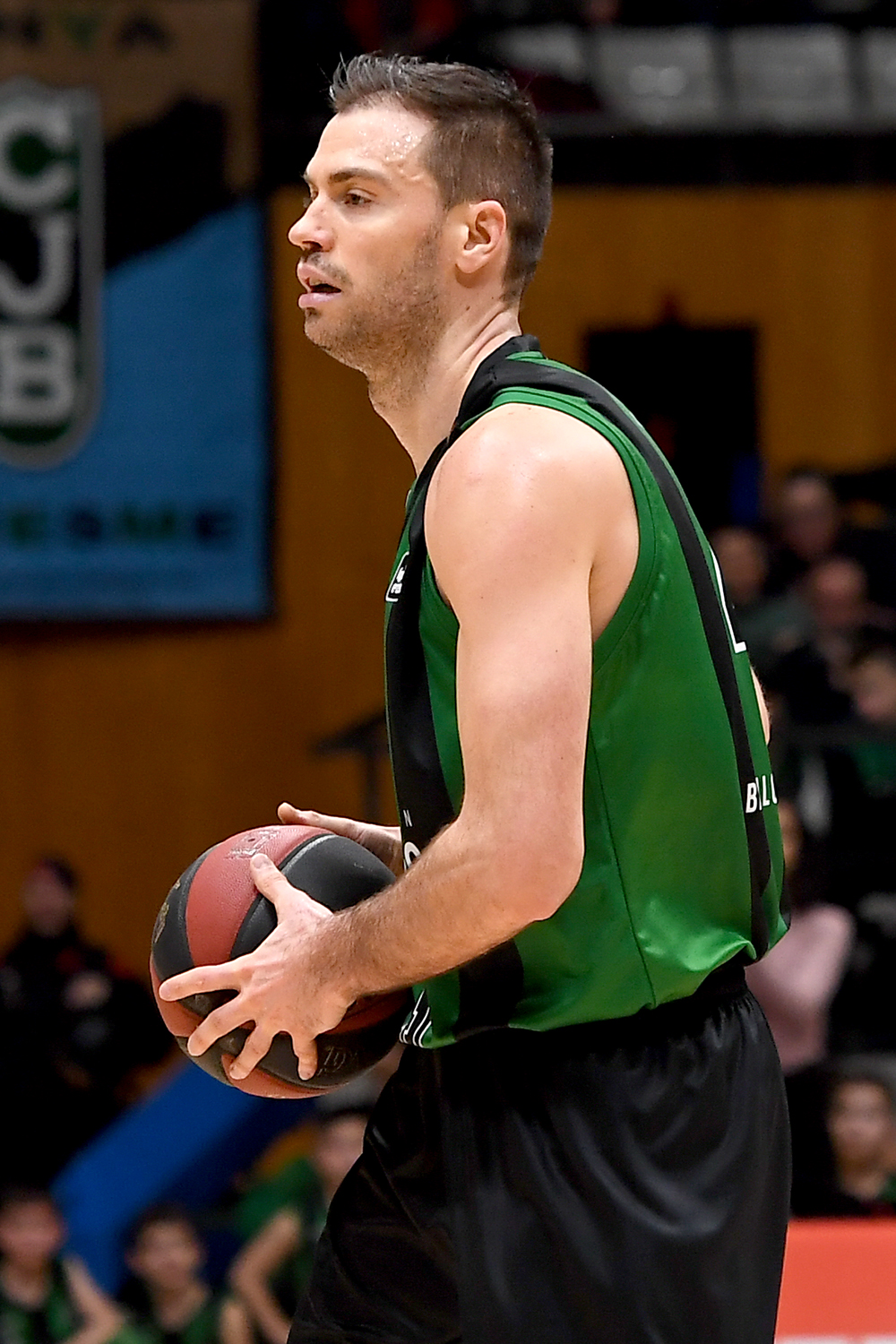
- Stević in 2020

Partizan Belgrade
- Title: Assistant coach
- League: Serbian SuperLeague; ABA League; EuroLeague

Personal information
- Born: 18 January 1984 (age 42) Nova Gorica, Slovenia, SFR Yugoslavia
- Listed height: 2.06 m (6 ft 9 in)
- Listed weight: 105 kg (231 lb)

Career information
- NBA draft: 2006: undrafted
- Playing career: 2003–2025
- Position: Power forward
- Coaching career: 2026–present

Career history

Playing
- 2003–2005: Borac Čačak
- 2005–2006: Mašinac
- 2006: Koper
- 2006–2008: Śląsk Wrocław
- 2008: Włocławek
- 2009–2010: Crvena zvezda
- 2010–2011: Oldenburg
- 2011: Bilbao
- 2011–2012: Casale Monferrato
- 2012–2013: Zielona Góra
- 2013–2015: Gaziantep
- 2015–2016: Fuenlabrada
- 2016–2019: Andorra
- 2019: Igokea
- 2019–2020: Miraflores
- 2020: Joventut Badalona
- 2020: Fuenlabrada
- 2020–2023: Gran Canaria
- 2023–2024: Hestia Menorca
- 2024: Lenovo Tenerife
- 2024–2025: Obradoiro

Coaching
- 2026–present: Partizan (assistant)

Career highlights
- EuroCup champion (2023); PLK champion (2013)

Oliver Stević (born 18 January 1984) is a Serbian professional basketball coach and former player who is currently an assistant coach for Partizan of the Serbian SuperLeague, the ABA League, and the EuroLeague. .

In early 2020, he joined Joventut Badalona of the Spanish League and Eurocup. Stević signed with Fuenlabrada on 22 October 2020, having played with the team during the 2015–16 season. On 29 November 2020 he signed with Herbalife Gran Canaria of the Liga ACB. Stević extended his contract with the team on 3 July 2021.
