= Verdi Inlet =

Inlet in Antarctica

Verdi Inlet (71°36′S 74°30′W) is an ice-filled inlet lying between Pesce Peninsula and Harris Peninsula, on the north side of the Beethoven Peninsula, situated in the southwest portion of Alexander Island, Antarctica. The inlet was observed from the air and first roughly mapped by the Ronne Antarctic Research Expedition in 1947–48. Remapped from the RARE air photos by Searle of the Falkland Islands Dependencies Survey in 1960. Named by United Kingdom Antarctic Place-Names Committee after Giuseppe Verdi (1813–1901), Italian opera composer.

== See also ==
- Fauré Inlet
- Haydn Inlet
- Schubert Inlet
