= Monteverdi Peninsula =

Peninsula in Antarctica

Monteverdi Peninsula (72°30′S 72°0′W) is a large ice-covered peninsula lying between the Bach Ice Shelf and George VI Sound, forming the southernmost extremity of Alexander Island, Antarctica. The southern side of the feature was first seen and charted by Finn Ronne and Carl Eklund of the United States Antarctic Service, 1939–41, who traversed the entire length of George VI Sound. The peninsula was mapped from trimetrogon air photography taken by the Ronne Antarctic Research Expedition in 1947–48, and from survey by the Falkland Islands Dependencies Survey, 1948–50. It was named by the UK Antarctic Place-Names Committee after Italian composer Claudio Monteverdi.

The north side of the peninsula is surrounded by the Bach Ice Shelf, a large ice shelf that separates it from Beethoven Peninsula. Fauré Inlet is the only inlet that indents the south side of the peninsula, and is filled with flowing from the adjacent George VI Ice Shelf and George VI Sound. Monteverdi Peninsula extends due east–west mainly because there are no peninsulas protruding out of either the north nor the south sides of this peninsula. Monteverdi Peninsula is one of the eight peninsulas of Alexander Island.
