= Beethoven Peninsula =

Peninsula in Antarctica

Coordinates: 71°44′S 73°41′W

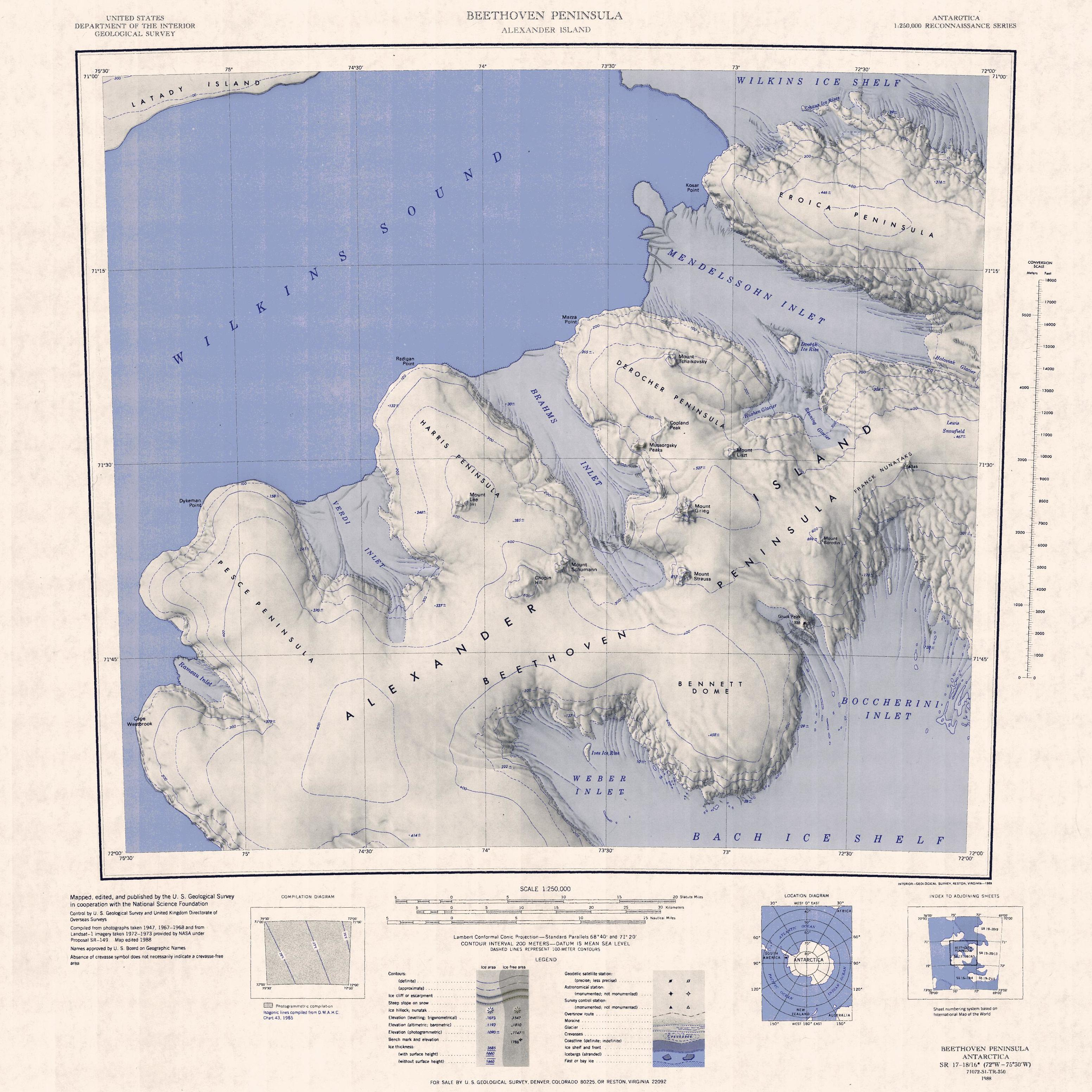
1:250,000 scale topographic map of the Beethoven Peninsula.

The Beethoven Peninsula is a deeply indented, ice-covered peninsula, 60 miles (100 km) long in a northeast–southwest direction and 60 miles (100 km) wide at its broadest part, forming the southwest part of Alexander Island, which lies off the southwestern portion of the Antarctic Peninsula. The south side of the peninsula is supported by the Bach Ice Shelf whilst the north side of the peninsula is supported by the Wilkins Ice Shelf. The Mendelssohn Inlet, the Brahms Inlet and the Verdi Inlet apparently intrude into it. The Bach Ice Shelf, Rossini Point and Berlioz Point are some distance away, on the Ronne Entrance from the Southern Ocean. Beethoven Peninsula is one of the eight peninsulas of Alexander Island.

The peninsula was first seen and photographed from the air in 1940 by the US Antarctic Service, which compiled the first rough map of southwest Alexander Island. It was resighted and photographed from the air by the 1947–48 Ronne Antarctic Research Expedition (RARE), and remapped from RARE photos by Derek J.H. Searle of the Falkland Islands Dependencies Survey in 1960. It was named by the UK Antarctic Place-Names Committee after Ludwig van Beethoven, one of the most revered figures in the history of Western music.

== See also ==
- Derocher Peninsula
- Shostakovich Peninsula
- Monteverdi Peninsula
