= List of people with given name Michael =

This is a list of people and characters with the given name Michael.

== People ==
=== A ===
- Michael Abber (born 1997 or 1998), American comedian
- Michael Abels (born 1962), American composer
- Michael Adamson (born 1971), Canadian painter
- Michael Lee Aday (1948–2022), American actor and singer
- Michael Addamo (born 1994), Australian poker player
- Michael Aiken (born 1932), American professor and sociologist
- Michael Alan (born 1977), American artist
- Michael Aldridge (1920–1994), English actor
- Michael Aldridge (born 1983), Australian rugby union player
- Michael Alfonso (1965–2007), American wrestler
- Michael Alfonso (born 1969), American former fugitive
- Michael Alig (1966–2020), American club promoter and convicted felon
- Michael Alison (1926–2004), British politician
- Michael Alldredge (1941–1997), American film and television actor
- Michael Allinson (1920-2010), British-American stage and film actor
- Michael Allison (1958–2020), American musician and vocalist
- Michael Allison (born 1990), Canadian basketball player
- Michael Allison (born 2004), British javelin thrower
- Michael Aloni (born 1984), Israeli actor, director, writer and television presenter
- Michael Amadio (born 1996), Canadian ice hockey player
- Michael Anania (born 1939), American poet, novelist, and essayist
- Michael Ancram (born 1945), British politician
- Michael Andersen (born 1974), Danish basketball player
- Michael Andlauer (born 1966), Canadian businessman
- Michael Andretti (born 1962), American racing driver
- Michael Anefur (born 1957), Swedish politician
- Michael Angarano (born 1987), American actor
- Michael Angelakos (born 1987), American musician, singer, songwriter and record producer
- Michael Angelis (1944–2020), English actor
- Michael Ankeny (born 1991), American alpine skier
- Michael Ansara (1922–2013), American actor
- Michael Antonyuk (1935–1993), Kazakhstani artist
- Michael Arceneaux (born 1984), American writer
- Michael Arden (born 1982), American actor, singer, musician, and theatre director
- Michael Arndt (born 1965), American screenwriter
- Michael Arnold (born 1944), Australian politician
- Michael Arnold (born 1979), British novelist
- Michael Aronov (born 1976), American actor
- Michael Artin (born 1934), German-American mathematician
- Michael Ashburner (1942-2023), English biologist
- Michael Ashby (1914-2004), British neurologist
- Michael F. Ashby (born 1935), British engineer and scientist
- Michael Ashcroft (1920–1949), British cryptographer
- Michael Ashcroft (born 1946), British-Belizean businessman, pollster and politician
- Michael Ashcroft (born 1964), Canadian sport shooter
- Michael Ashford (born 1955), American politician
- Michael Ashton (born 1982), New Zealand makeup artist, hairstylist, beauty expert, and brand founder
- Michael Aspel (born 1933), English television presenter
- Michael J. Astrue (born 1956), American lawyer
- Michael Atherton (born 1950), Australian musician, composer, academic and author
- Michael Atherton (born 1968), English broadcaster, journalist and cricketer
- Michael Atingi-Ego (born 1965), Ugandan economist
- Michael Atiyah (1929–2019), British-Lebanese mathematician
- Michael Attenborough (born 1950), English theatre director
- Michael Attwell (1943–2006), English film and television actor
- Michael Audley (1913–1995), American actor, dialogue advisor and film and theatre director
- Michael Auret (1936–2020), Zimbabwean activist and politician
- Michael Austen (born 1964), South African cricketer
- Michael Avenatti (born 1971), American attorney

=== B ===
- Michael Ballhaus (1935–2017), German cinematographer
- Michael Balling (1866–1925), German violist and conductor
- Michael Bambang Hartono (1939-2026), Indonesian businessman
- Michael Bani (born 1984), Australian rugby league footballer
- Michael Barbaro (born 1979), American journalist
- Michael Barbiero (born 1949), American record producer, mixer, engineer, and songwriter
- Michael J. Barron (1933–2021), American lawyer, judge, and politician
- Michael Barron (born 1974), English footballer and coach
- Michael Barrymore (born 1952), English actor and comedian
- Michael Bate (born 1947), Canadian media entrepreneur
- Michael Batiste (born 1970), American football player
- Michael Batiste (born 1977), American basketball player and coach
- Michael Battistini (born 1996), Sammarinese footballer
- Michael Bay (born 1965), American filmmaker
- Michael Beach (born 1963), American actor
- Michael Beasley (born 1968), British bishop
- Michael Beasley (born 1989), American basketball player
- Michael Beauchamp (born 1981), Australian footballer
- Michael Beavis (1929–2020), Royal Air Force officer
- Michael Becken (born 1980), German politician
- Michael Beckerman (born 1951), American musicologist
- Michael Beckett (born 1995), British Olympic sailor
- Michael Beckley (born 1963), Australian actor
- Michael Beckwith (born 1956), American writer
- Michael Been (1950–2010), American rock musician
- Michael Behenna (born 1983), United States Army First Lieutenant
- Michael J. Belton (1934–2018), American astronomer
- Michael Ben David (born 1996), Israeli singer
- Michael Benedikt (1935–2007), American poet, editor, and literary critic
- Michael Benedikt (1946-2025), South African architect, urbanist, and academic
- Michael Bennet (born 1964), American attorney and politician
- Michael Bentt (born 1965), American film, television actor, and boxer
- Michael Benyaer (born 1970), Canadian actor
- Michael Berkeley (born 1948), English composer
- Michael Berryman (born 1948), American actor
- Michael Bidner (1944–1989), Canadian graphic artist and painter
- Michael Bidwill (born 1964), American businessman and attorney
- Michael Biehn (born 1956), American actor
- Michael Bisping (born 1979), English actor, commentator, sports analyst, and mixed martial artist
- Michael Blackson (born 1972), Ghanaian-American actor and comedian
- Michael Bland (born 1969), American musician
- Michael Blassie (1948–1972), United States Air Force officer
- Michael Bloomberg (born 1942), American businessman and politician
- Michael Blumlein (1948–2019), American fiction writer and physician
- Michael Presley Bobbitt (born 1976), American playwright and novelist
- Michael Bolton (born 1953), American singer and songwriter
- Michael Bonema (born 1998), American rapper, songwriter and record producer
- Richard Bonney (1947–2017), English historian and priest
- Michael Boorda (1939–1996), United States Navy admiral
- Michael Botticelli (born 1958), American public health official
- Michael Ray Bower (born 1975), American actor
- Michael Brantley (born 1987), American baseball player
- Michael Brdar (born 1994), American baseball coach
- Michael Brecher (1925–2022), Canadian political scientist
- Michael Brecker (1949–2007), American jazz saxophonist and composer
- Michael Brick (1974–2016), American journalist and songwriter
- Michael Bronstein (born 1980), British and Israeli computer scientist and entrepreneur
- Michael Broyde (born 1964), American law professor
- Michael Bublé (born 1975), Canadian singer
- Michael Buerk (born 1946), British newsreader and journalist
- Michael Buffer (born 1944), American ring announcer
- Michael Büge (born 1966), German politician
- Michael Bunting (born 1995), Canadian ice hockey player
- Michael Burks (1957-2012), American guitarist, singer and songwriter
- Michael Burleigh (born 1955), English author and historian
- Michael Burry (born 1971), American investor, hedge fund manager, and physician
- Michael A. Burstein (born 1970), American writer of science fiction

=== C ===
- Michael Cage (born 1962), American basketball player
- Michael Caines (born 1969), English chef
- Michael Callan (1935–2022), American actor
- Michael Callen (1955–1993), American singer, songwriter, composer, author, and AIDS activist
- Michael Capponi (born 1972), American businessman
- Michael Carbajal (born 1967), American boxer
- Michael Carbonaro (born 1975 or 1976), American actor and magician
- Michael Carew (born 1966), Trinidadian cricketer
- Michael Cashman (born 1950), British actor, politician, and LGBT rights activist
- Michael Causer (1989–2008), English murder victim
- Michael Cera (born 1988), Canadian actor and musician
- Michael Cerveris (born 1960), American actor, singer, and guitarist
- Michael Chabon (born 1963), American novelist, screenwriter, columnist and short story writer
- Michael Chagares (born 1962), American lawyer
- Michael Chambers (born 1967), American dancer and actor
- Michael A. Chambers (born 1946), Canadian lawyer
- Michael Champion (1946–2021), American singer, songwriter and musician
- Michael Chang (1898-1973), Chinese bishop
- Michael Chang (born 1972), American tennis player and coach
- Michael Charles (born 1956), Australian blues musician
- Michael Charlton (1927–2025), Australian-born British journalist
- Michael Charlton-Weedy (born 1950), British Army officer and senior civil servant
- Michael Chaturantabut (born 1975), Thai-American actor, stuntman and martial artist
- Michael Chaves (born 1978), American filmmaker
- Michael Chavis (born 1995), American baseball player
- Michael Checkland (born 1936), British television executive
- Michael Cheung (born 1996), Hong Kong singer and actor
- Michael Chiarello (1962–2023), American celebrity chef
- Michael Chiklis (born 1963), American actor
- Michael Chilaka (born 2000), Israeli football player
- Michael Childers (1784–1854), British Army officer
- Michael Chisholm (1931–2024), British economic and human geographer and academic
- Michael Chisholm (born 1948), Canadian politician
- Michael Cho (1982-2007), American artist
- Michael Chong (born 1971), Canadian politician
- Michael C. Chorlton (1913–1951), English film editor and occasional director
- Michael Chris-Ike (born 1999), Canadian football player
- Michael Cimino (1939–2016), American author, producer, screenwriter, and film director
- Michael Cimino (born 1999), American actor
- Michael Cisco (born 1970), American writer
- Michael Claesson (born 1965), Swedish officer
- Michael Cleveland (born 1980), American bluegrass fiddle player
- Michael Coats (born 1946), American astronaut
- Michael Coats Jr. (born 2001), American football cornerback
- Michael Cocks (1929–2001), British Labour politician
- Michael D. Coe (1929–2019), American archaeologist, anthropologist, epigrapher, and author
- Michael Coe (born 1983), American football player
- Michael Cognata (born 1988), American actor
- Michael Colglazier (born 1967), American executive at Disney and Virgin Galactic
- Michael G. Comeau (born 1956), American attorney and politician
- Michael Constantine (1927–2021), American actor
- Michael Copon (born 1982), American actor and producer
- Michael Shawn Crahan (born 1969), American musician
- Michael Craze (1942–1998), British actor
- Michael Crichton (1942–2008), American author and filmmaker
- Michael Cristofer (born 1945), American actor
- Michael Cuccione (1985–2001), Canadian child actor, singer, dancer, author, and cancer research activist
- Michael Cummings (1919-1997), British newspaper cartoonist
- Michael A. Cummings (born 1945), American artist and quilter
- Michael Cumpsty (born 1960), British actor
- Michael Curtiz (1886–1962), Hungarian-American film director
- Michael Czepil (born 1986), Australian basketball coach
- Michael Czerny (born 1946), Czech-Canadian cardinal
- Michael Czinkota (1951–2022), American professor
- Michael Czugaj (born 1986), Australian drug trafficker
- Michael Czyborra (born 1997), German footballer
- Michael Czysz (1964–2016), American motorcycle racer

=== D ===
- Michael Damaskinos (1530/35–1592/93), Greek painter
- Michael de Freitas, birth name of Michael Abdul Malik (1933–1975), Trinidadian political activist
- Michael de Mesa (born 1960), Filipino actor and director
- Michael Deiter (born 1996), American football player
- Michael Del Grande (born 1953), Canadian politician
- Michael Dell (born 1965), American businessman, investor and philanthropist
- Michael DeLorenzo (born 1959), Puerto Rican actor
- Michael DeLuise (born 1969), American actor, film director, and film producer
- Michael Des Barres (born 1948), English actor and singer
- Michael DeWine (born 1947), American politician and attorney
- Michael Dante DiMartino (born 1974), American animator, producer, writer, and director
- Michael Dingsdag (born 1982), Dutch footballer
- Michael Dinner (born 1953), American director, producer, and screenwriter
- Michael Ditka (1939-2026), American coach, commentator and football player
- Michael Divinity (born 1997), American football player
- Michael Dogbe (born 1996), American football player
- Michael Dokes (1958–2012), American boxer
- Michael Donald (1961–1981), American murder victim
- Michael Doohan (born 1965), Australian motorcycle racer
- Michael Dorn (born 1952), American actor
- Michael Drayer (born 1986), American actor
- Michael Drescher (born 1954), American entrepreneur and philanthropist
- Michael Dudikoff (born 1954), American actor
- Michael Duhig (1953–2010), Canadian actor and radio host
- Michael Dukakis (born 1933), American politician
- Michael Dunahee (born 1986), Canadian child who disappeared in 1991
- Michael Dunigan (born 1989), American basketball player
- Michael Durrell (born 1943), American actor
- Michael Raoul Duval (1936–2001), American investment banker and lawyer

=== E ===
- Michael Eakin (born 1948), American judge
- Michael Ealy (born 1973), American actor
- Michael Easton (1954–2004), British composer, musician, and music critic
- Michael Easton (born 1967), American television actor, writer, and director
- Michael Eaton (born 1945), English playwright and scriptwriter
- Michael Eavis (born 1935), English farmer, businessman and creator of the Glastonbury Festival
- Michael Eberwein (born 1996), German footballer
- Michael Ebling (born 1967), German politician
- Michael Echanis (1950–1978), American soldier
- Michael Echeruo (born 1937), Nigerian academic, professor, and literary critic
- Michael Echols (born 1977), American politician
- Michael Eddowes (1903–1993), British author and lawyer
- Michael Ede (born 1975), British Nigerian football agent
- Michael Eisen (born 1967), American computational biologist and journal editor
- Michael Eisenbach (born 1945), Israeli biochemist
- Michael Eisenberg (born 1971), American-born Israeli businessman
- Michael Eisner (born 1942), American businessman
- Michael Eitan (born 1944), Israeli politician
- Michael Elgin (born 1986), Canadian wrestler
- Michael Elias (born 1940), American writer, film director and producer
- Michael Ellam (born 1968), British civil servant and former banker
- Michael Ende (1929–1995), German writer of fantasy and children's fiction
- Michael Ensign (born 1944), American actor
- Michael Epp (born 1983), British actor
- Micheal Eric (born 1988), Nigerian basketball player
- Michael Erlewine (born 1941), American musician
- Michael Espendiller (born 1989), German politician
- Michael Espinoza Coila (born 1991), Peruvian lawyer and activist
- Michael Essex (born 1985), British rugby union player
- Michael Essien (born 1982), Ghanaian footballer player
- Michael Christopher Estes (born 1971), American terrorist
- Michael J. Estocin (1931–1967), United States Navy officer
- Michael Etaba (born 1982), Nigerian politician
- Michael Ettmüller (1644–1683), German physician
- Michael Etulain (born 1980), Uruguayan footballer
- Michael Eury (born 1957), American editor and writer of comic books

=== F ===
- Michael Fabiano (born 1984), American operatic tenor
- Michaël Fabre (born 1984), Algerian footballer
- Michael Fabricant (born 1950), British politician
- Michael Fagg (born 1954), American politician
- Michael Fagun (1935–2025), Nigerian bishop
- Michael Fahy (1951–2019), Irish farmer and politician
- Michael Fainstat (1923–2010), Canadian politician
- Michael Falch (born 1956), Danish musician, writer, and actor
- Michael Falcon (1888–1976), British cricketer and politician
- Michael Falkenmayer (born 1982), German footballer
- Michael Falkesgaard (born 1991), Filipino footballer
- Michael Fall (born 1980), Belgian musician
- Michael Fallon (1867–1931), Canadian bishop
- Michael Fallon (born 1952), British politician
- Michael Fallon (born 1980), Irish singer
- Michael Fanone (born 1980), American police officer and law enforcement analyst
- Michael Fansler (1883–1963), American judge and football player
- Michael Faraday (1791–1867), English scientist
- Michael Farfan (born 1988), American soccer player
- Michael Farina (born 1958), American wrestler
- Michael Farley, American politician
- Michael Farthing (born 1948), British academic
- Michael Fassbender (born 1977), German-Irish actor
- Michael Fatialofa (born 1992), New Zealand rugby union player
- Michael Fawcett (born 1962), British royal servant
- Michael Federmann (born 1943), Israeli businessman
- Michael Feinstein (born 1956), American pianist, singer and musical revivalist
- Michael Fekete (1886–1957), Hungarian-Israeli mathematician
- Michael Feliz (born 1993), Dominican baseball player
- Michael Felts (1956–1996), American deaf gay activist
- Michael Finley (born 1973), American basketball player
- Michael Fishman (born 1981), American actor, writer, and producer
- Michael Fitzell, American politician
- Michael Flanders (1922–1975), English actor and writer
- Michael Flannery (1818-1891), Irish bishop
- Michael Flannery (1903–1994), Irish military officer
- Michael Flaskey (born 1967), American businessman
- Michael Flatley (born 1958), American step dancer
- Michael Fleisher (1942-2018), American comic writer
- Michael Fletcher (born 1977), American football linebacker
- Michael Fletcher (born 2001), American football defensive tackle
- Michael Flinn (1917–1983), British economic historian
- Michael Flomen (born 1952), Canadian artist
- Michael Floyd (born 1976), English hammer thrower
- Michael Floyd (born 1989), American football player
- Michael Fonfara (1946–2021), Canadian keyboard player
- Michael Fonsell (born 2003), Finnish footballer
- Michael Forret (born 2004), American baseball player
- Michael Fortier (born 1962), Canadian financier, lawyer and former politician
- Michael Fourman (born 1950), British blogger, logician, mathematician, and computer scientist
- Michael Fournier (born 1971), Canadian curler
- Michael Fracaro (born 1995), Brazilian footballer
- Michael Franck (1609–1667), German composer and poet
- Michael Francke (1946–1989), American judge
- Michael Francklin (1733–1782), Canadian politician
- Michael Franken (born 1957), US Navy officer
- Michael Frankenberg (born 1978), German archer
- Michael Franti (born 1966), American musician
- Michael Franz (born 1964), American computer scientist
- Michael Franzese (born 1951), American mobster
- Michael Frass (born 1954), Austrian medical specialist
- Michael Frassetto (born 1961), American historian
- Michael Frayn (born 1933), English playwright and novelist
- Michael Freytag (born 1958), German politician
- Michael Fuller (born 1953), American football player
- Michael Fuller (born 1959), British chief constable
- Michael Fuller (born 1972), American DJ, nightlife visionary and nightclub executive
- Michael Fulmer (born 1993), American baseball player
- Michael Furst (1856–1934), American lawyer
- Michael Fürtbauer (born 1972), Austrian politician

=== G ===
- Michael T. Gabbett (born 1974), Australian geneticist and academic
- Michael Gage (1945–2021), American politician
- Michael Gambon (1940–2023), Irish-English actor
- Michael Gandolfini (born 1999), American actor
- Michael Gargiulo (born 1960), American television news anchor
- Michael Gargiulo (born 1976), American serial killer
- Michael Giacchino (born 1967), American film composer
- Michael Gilden (1962–2006), American actor
- Michael Giles (born 1942), English drummer, percussionist, and vocalist
- Michael Gillis (1949–2007), American academic and writer
- Michael Gilmore (born 1995), American-Belgian basketball player
- Michael Gira (born 1954), American musician, author, and artist
- Michael Gladis (born 1977), American actor
- Michael Glaser (1943-2025), American poet and educator
- Michael Gläser (born 1957), German singer
- Michael Glatze (born 1975), American activist and pastor
- Michael Goi (born 1959), American cinematographer and film director
- Michael A. Goorjian (born 1971), American actor, filmmaker, and writer
- Michael Gove (born 1967), Scottish journalist, author and politician
- Michael Gover (1913–1987), English actor
- Michael Grade (born 1943), English television executive and businessman
- Michael Grais (born 1943), American screenwriter
- Michael Greer (1938–2002), American actor, comedian and cabaret performer
- Michael Greis (born 1976), German biathlete
- Michael Grieve (1932–1995), Scottish journalist and political activist
- Michael Grove (born 1996), American baseball player
- Michael Gudinski (1952–2021), Australian entrepreneur, business executive, concert promoter and film producer
- Michael Guider (1950–2024), Australian sex offender
- Michael Waybe Gunter (born 1961), American football player

=== H ===
- Michael Halpin (born 1978 or 1979), American politician
- Michael Harding (born 1953), Irish writerr
- Michael Harding (born 2001), American soccer player
- Michael Harring (born 1979), American film director
- Michael Havers (1923–1992), British barrister and politician
- Michael Hegstrand (1957–2003), American wrestler
- Michael Heidelberger (1888–1991), American immunologist
- Michael S. Heiser (1963–2023), American writer and biblical scholar
- Michael Heizer (born 1944), American land artist
- Michael Heldman (born 2003), American football player
- Michael Henley (1939–2014), British bishop
- Michael Hepburn (born 1991), Australian track and road cyclist
- Michael Herbig (born 1968), German comedian and actor
- Michael Hermosillo (born 1995), American baseball player
- Michael Shawn Hickenbottom, birth name of Shawn Michaels (born 1965), American wrestler
- Michael Hite (born 1966), American politician
- Michael Hodgman (1938–2013), Australian politician and lawyer
- Michael Holliday (1924–1963), English singer
- Michael Holton (born 1961), American basketball player
- Michael Hopper (born 1969), Canadian Forces officer
- Michael Hordern (1911–1995), English actor
- Michael Horovitz (1935–2021), British poet
- Michael Hrabal (born 2005), Czech ice hockey player
- Michael Hui (born 1942), Hong Kong actor, comedian, scriptwriter and director
- Michael Hutchence (1960–1997), Australian musician

=== I ===
- Michael Ibru (1930–2016), Nigerian businessman, industrialist, and philanthropist
- Michael Ignatieff (born 1947), Canadian author, academic and politician
- Michael Imperioli (born 1966), American actor, writer, and musician
- Michael Iorio (born 1964), American wrestler
- Michael Irby (born 1972), American actor
- Michael Irvin (born 1966), American sports commentator
- Michael Isaacson (born 1946), American composer
- Michael Iseberg (1940-2026), American musician and composer
- Michael Isikoff (born 1952), American investigative journalist
- Michael Ivins (born 1963), American musician
- Michael Izen (born 1967), American bishop

=== J ===
- Michael Jacquet (born 1997), American football player
- Michael Jace (born 1962), American actor and murderer
- Michael Jack (born 1946), British politician
- Michael Jaffe (born 1945), American TV and film producer
- Michael Jaffé (1923–1997), British art historian and curator
- Michael Jerrell (born 1999), American football player
- Michael Jeter (1952–2003), American actor
- Michael Jurgens (born 2000), American football player

=== K ===
- Michael Kamen (1948–2003), American composer
- Michael Karkoc (1919–2019), Ukrainian military officer
- Michael Katleman (born 1960), American film, television director and producer
- Michael Kean (died 1823), Irish artist
- Michael Keaton (born 1951), American actor
- Michael Kefalianos (born 1970), Greek bodybuilder
- Michael Key (born 1962), American make-up artist
- Michael Kibet (born 1999), Kenyan middle- and long-distance runner
- Michael Kidd (1915–2007), American choreographer
- Michael Kidd (born 1959), Australian general practitioner
- Michael Kidd-Gilchrist (born 1993), American basketball player
- Michael A. Kimelman (born 1971–1972), American entrepreneur
- Michael Klim (born 1977), Australian swimmer and world champion
- Michael Klinger (born 1980), Australian first-class cricketer
- Michael Kmit (1910–1981), Ukrainian painter
- Michael Knorr (born 2000), American baseball player
- Michael Knost (born 1967), American suspense author
- Michael Koomen (1979–2011), Dutch amateur footballer
- Michael Kopech (born 1996), American baseball player
- Michael Korda (born 1933), English writer and novelist
- Michael Kors (born 1959), American fashion designer
- Michael Koryta (born 1982), American author
- Michael Kosta (born 1979), American stand-up comedian
- Michael Kovach (born 1995), American voice actor and content creator
- Michael Krassner (born 1971), American musician and composer
- Michael John Kricfalusi (born 1955), Canadian blogger, animator, voice actor and illustrator
- Michael Krull (1925–1957), American kidnapper and sex offender
- Michael L. Kurtz (1941-2025), American historian
- Michael Kutílek (1951–2017), Czech spree killer

=== L ===
- Michael Lamp (born 1977), Danish badminton player
- Michael Landau (born 1958), American musician
- Michael Landon (1936–1991), American actor
- Michael Laser (born 1954), American novelist
- Michael Latifi (born 1962), Iranian-Canadian businessman
- Michael Laws (born 1926), English cricketer
- Michael Laws (born 1957), New Zealand politician, broadcaster and writer
- Michael Learned (born 1939), American actress
- Michael LeBlanc (born 1987), Canadian track athlete
- Michael Leib (1760–1822), American politician
- Michael Leitch (born 1988), Japanese rugby union player
- Michael Lembeck (born 1948), American actor
- Michael G. Lenett (born 1962), American politician
- Michael Levey (1927–2008), English art historian
- Michael Levey (1948–2003), American infomercial host
- Michael Lindsey (born 1987), American football player
- Michael Ljunggren (1962–1995), Swedish organized crime figure
- Michael Lohan (born 1960), American television personality
- Michael F. Lohr (born 1952), American naval officer and military lawyer
- Michael Lorenzen (born 1992), American baseball player
- Michael Luciano (1909–1992), American film and television editor

=== M ===
- Michael MacLennan (born 1968), Canadian playwright, television writer and television producer
- Michael MacMillan (born 1957), Canadian film and broadcasting executive
- Michael Madhu (1969 or 1970–2020), Indian film actor
- Michael Madhusudan Dutt (1824–1873), Indian poet and dramatist
- Michael Madigan (born 1942), American politician
- Michael Madison (born 1977), American serial killer and sex offender
- Michael Malone (1942–2022), American author and television writer
- Michael Maltese (1908–1981), American screenwriter and storyboard artist
- Michael Mando (born 1981), Canadian actor
- Michael Mariano (1914–1987), Somali politician and businessman
- Michael Marmot (born 1945), English professor
- Michael Marquart (born 1957), American music producer, drummer, and guitarist
- Michael Maschler (1927–2008), Israeli mathematician
- Michael Mastro (born 1925), American real estate developer
- Michael Mastro (born 1962), American actor
- Michael McCarron (born 1995), American ice hockey player
- Michael McCaul, (born 1962), American attorney and politician
- Michael McConnohie (born 1951), American voice actor, writer and director
- Michael McElhatton (born 1963), Irish actor and writer
- Michael McElhatton (born 1975), Irish footballer
- Michael McFaul (born 1963), American academic and diplomat
- Michael J. McCulley (born 1943), American naval officer and aviator
- Michael J. McGivney (1852–1890), Irish-American Catholic priest
- Michael Wayne McGray (born 1965), Canadian serial killer
- Michael McGurk (ca. 1883–1948), Northern Irish politician
- Michael McGurk (1958-2009), Australian businessman
- Michael McKagan (born 1964), American musician
- Michael McKean (born 1947), American actor, comedian, screenwriter, composer, singer, and musician
- Michael McKean (born 1976), American artist and educator
- Michael McLaney (1915–1994), American casino operator and sports gambler
- Michael McLaverty (1904–1992), Irish writer
- Michael McLendon (born 1963), American politician and insurance producer
- Michael McMahan (born 1981), American comedy writer and television producer
- Michael Joseph McNally (1860–1916), United States Marine Sergeant
- Michael McWilliam (born 1933), British banker, academic administrator, and historian
- Michael Meenaghan (died 1994), British forensic scientist
- Michael Melby (born 1969), Swedish politician
- Michael Michele (born 1966), American actress
- Michael Milhoan (born 1957), American actor
- Michael Milken (born 1946), American financier and philanthropist
- Michael Mizanin (born 1980), American actor and wrestler
- Michael Modest (born 1971), American wrestler
- Michael Mohede (1983–2016), Indonesian singer
- Michael Moody (born 1950), English guitarist
- Michael Moorer (born 1967), American boxer
- Michael Morpurgo (born 1943), English book author, poet, playwright, and librettist
- Michael Moutoussis (1885–1956), Greek military officer
- Michael G. Moye (born 1954), American photographer and television writer and producer
- Michael Mulgrew (born 1965), American teacher
- Michael Mulunga (born 1989), Namibian politician
- Michael Munnelly (1941–1964), British murder victim
- Michael Musto (born 1955), American journalist

=== N ===
- Michael Negrete (born 1981), American missing person
- Michael Nesmith (1942–2021), American musician
- Michael Netzer (born 1955), American-Israeli artist
- Michael Nigg (1969–1995), American actor and murder victim
- Michael Noel (born 1947), American politician
- Michael Novak (1933–2017), American Catholic philosopher, journalist, novelist, and diplomat
- Michael Novak (born 1990), Austrian footballer
- Michael Norwood (born 1985), American basketball player
- Michael Nouri (born 1945), American screen and stage actor
- Michael F. Nozzolio (born 1951), American New York State Senator
- Michael Nyman (born 1944), English composer, pianist, librettist, musicologist, and filmmaker

=== O ===
- Michael O'Byrne (born 1988), Scottish footballer
- Michael O'Donovan (1903–1966), Irish author and translator
- Michael O'Donovan (born 1976), Irish football player
- Michael Ojemudia (born 1997), American football player
- Michael Olai (1510–1557), Finnish bishop
- Michael Olise (born 2001), British-French footballer
- Michael Ollis (1988–2013), American soldier
- Michael Ondaatje (born 1943), Canadian author and filmmaker
- Michael Onwenu (born 1997), American football player

=== P ===
- Michael Palin (born 1943), British actor, comedian, writer and television presenter
- Michael Panes (born 1963), American actor, writer, musician and composer
- Michael Pangilinan (born 1995), Filipino singer
- Michael Papajohn (born 1964), American character actor, stuntman and former college baseball player
- Michael Papierski (born 1996), American baseball player
- Michael Paraskevas (born 1961), American illustrator, cartoonist, and animation producer
- Michael Paré (born 1958), American actor
- Michael Parenti (born 1933), American political scientist
- Michael Parkes (born 1944), American painter
- Michael Parr (born 1986), British actor
- Michael Paye (born 1983), American basketball player
- Michael Peña (Bornéu 1976), American actor
- Michael Pence (born 1959), American politician
- Michael Penix Jr. (born 2000), American football player
- Michael Penner (1957–2009), American sportswriter
- Michael D. Penner (born 1969), Canadian lawyer and businessman
- Michael Penniman Jr. (born 1983), Lebanese-British singer-songwriter
- Michael Pennington (1943–2026), English actor, director and writer
- Michael Peoples (born 1991), American baseball player
- Michael Peraza (born 1955), Cuban-American animator, art director, conceptual artist and historian of animation
- Michael Pfaff (born 1973), American musician
- Michael Pineda (born 1989), Dominican baseball player
- Michael Plassmeyer (born 1996), American baseball player
- Michael Player (1960–1986), American serial killer
- Michael Polakovs (1923–2009), Latvian-born American circus clown and actor
- Michael Polanyi (1891–1976), Hungarian-British chemist, economist and philosopher
- Michael Polchlopek (born 1965), American wrestler
- Michael Pompeo (born 1963), American politician, Secretary of State of the US
- Michael Portillo (born 1953), British journalist, broadcaster and politician
- Michael Prescott (born 1960), American contemporary writer
- Michael Prestwich (born 1943), English historian

=== Q ===
- Michael Quatro (born 1943), American keyboard player and songwriter
- Michael Quick (born 1959), American color commentator and football player
- Michael Quintero (born 1980), Colombian tennis player

=== R ===
- Michael Radford (born 1946), English film director and screenwriter
- Michael Rady (born 1981), American actor
- Michael Randle (born 1933), English peace campaigner and researcher
- Michael Rapaport (born 1970), American actor and comedian
- Michael Rapino (born 1967), Canadian-American business executive
- Michael Rapoport (born 1948), Austrian mathematician
- Michael Reaves (1950–2023), American television writer
- Michael Redgrave (1908–1985), English actor and filmmaker
- Michael Redl (1936–2013), German handball player and coach
- Michael Redlicki (born 1993), American tennis player
- Michael Reeve (born 1943), British classicist
- Michael Registe (born 1982), American criminal
- Michael Reisser (1946–1988), Israeli politician
- Michael Rennie (1909–1971), British film, television and stage actor
- Michael Trent Reznor (born 1965), American musician
- Michael Robison (born 1955), Canadian film and television director
- Michael Rockefeller (1938–1961), American anthropologist and art collector
- Michael Röls-Leitmann (born 1997), German politician
- Michael Rooker (1743 or 1746–1801), English painter
- Michael Rooker (born 1955), American actor
- Michael Rooney (born 1962), American dancer and choreographer
- Michael Rosenbaum (born 1972), American actor
- Michael Rosenblum (1954-disappeared 1980), American missing person
- Michael Rotunda (born 1958), American wrestler
- Michael Roufogalis (1921–2000), Greek Army officer
- Michael Rowse (born 1948), Hong Kong public figure
- Michael Rubbo (born 1938), Australian filmmaker, screenwriter, and publisher
- Michael Ruse (born 1940), British-born Canadian philosopher of science
- Michael Rye (1918–2012), American actor

=== S ===
- Michael Sabatino (born 1955), American actor
- Michael Sabia (born 1953), Canadian businessman and civil servant
- Michael Sacks (born 1948), American actor
- Michael Sager (born 2003), Filipino-Canadian actor
- Michael Sak (born 1959), American politician
- Michael Sandy (1977–2006), American hit and run victim
- Michael Sarrazin (1940–2011), Canadian actor
- Michael Schenker (born 1955), German guitarist
- Michael Scherer (born 1993), American football player and coach
- Michael Schermick (born 1958), American guitarist
- Michael Schiavello (born 1975), Australian sports commentator and journalist
- Michael Schoeffling (born 1960), American actor and model
- Michael Schumacher (born 1969), German racing driver
- Michael Schur (born 1975), American television writer, producer, director, and actor
- Michael Schwerner (1939–1964), American civil rights activist
- Michael Scot (c. 1175–1232), Scottish astrologer
- Michael M. Sears (born 1947), American executive
- Michael Seater (born 1987), Canadian actor, director, screenwriter, and producer
- Michael Seatter (1945–2008), English rugby union player
- Michael Seifert (1924–2010), Ukrainian-born Nazi war criminal and SS guard
- Michael Sela (1924–2022), Israeli immunologist
- Michael Sembello (born 1954), American singer, guitarist, keyboardist, songwriter, composer and producer
- Michael Sessions (born 1987), American mayor
- Michael Kantakouzenos Şeytanoğlu (1510–1578), Ottoman Greek magnate
- Michael Abraham Shadid (1882–1966), Lebanese doctor
- Michael Shane (1927–1994), American lawyer and actor
- Michael Sheen (born 1969), Welsh actor, television producer and political activist
- Michael Shepley (1907–1961), British actor
- Michael Shermer (born 1954), American science writer, and historian of science
- Michael Showalter (born 1970), American director, writer, and producer
- Michael Shrieve (born 1949), American drummer, percussionist, and composer
- Michael Shur (born 1942), Russian and American physicist
- Michael Shure (born 1966), American politician
- Michael Silka (1958–1984), American spree killer
- Michael Silverstein (1945–2020), American linguist
- Michael Singh (1945–2005), Trinidadian-born American serial killer
- Michael J. Socolow (born 1968), American media historian and broadcast journalist
- Michael Sokolowski (born 1962), Canadian sprinter
- Michael Sorvino (born 1977), American actor and producer
- Michael Spavor (born 1976), Canadian consultant
- Michael Spilotro (1944–1986), American murder victim
- Michael St. Angel (1916–1984), American film actor
- Michael St. Gerard (born 1961), American former actor and pastor
- Michael A. Stackpole (born 1957), American science fiction and fantasy writer
- Michael Stefanic (born 1996), American baseball player
- Michael Stich (born 1968), German tennis player
- Michael Stillman (born 1957), American mathematician
- Michael Stipe (born 1960), American singer, songwriter and artist
- Michael Stoyanov (born 1970), American actor
- Michael Strahan (born 1971), American footballer and television personality
- Michael Straight (1916–2004), American magazine publisher, novelist, and patron of the arts
- Michael J. Stull (1949–2002), American songwriter
- Michael Suen (1944-2024), Hong Kong politician
- Michael Sugrue (1957–2024), American historian and university professor
- Michael Sumpter (1947–2001), American serial killer and sex offender
- Michael Sundin (1961–1989), English television presenter, actor, dancer and trampolinist
- Michael Swango (born 1954), American physician and serial killer
- Michael Sym (died 1577), Scottish goldsmith

=== T ===
- Michael Taaffe (born 2003), American football player
- Michael Tarry (died 2013), Canadian singer
- Michael Teutul (born 1978), American television personality
- Michael Therriault (born 1977), Canadian actor
- Michael Thevis (1932–2013), American pornographer and convicted murderer
- Michael Thwaites (1915–2005), Australian academic, poet, and intelligence officer
- Michael Toglia (born 1998), American baseball player
- Michael Tolkin (born 1950), American filmmaker and novelist
- Michael Roy Toney (1965–2009), American charged and wrongfully convicted in 1999 for a bombing
- Michael Tong (born 1969), Hong Kong actor
- Michael Traynor (born 1975), American actor
- Michael Tree (1934–2018), American violist
- Michael Trucco (born 1970), American actor
- Michael Tsur (born 1963), Israeli attorney, negotiator, mediator, and academic
- Michael Tylo (1948–2021), American actor

=== U ===
- Michael Ungar (born 1963), Canadian researcher
- Michael Urbano (born 1960), American musician, programmer, and record producer
- Michael Urie (born 1980), American actor
- Michael Usi (born 1968), Malawian politician
- Michael E. Uslan (born 1951), American lawyer and film producer
- Michael Utley (born 1947), American musician, songwriter, record producer, and musical director

=== V ===
- Michael Vale (1922–2005), American actor
- Michael Van Buren Jr. (born 2004), American football player
- Michael Van Wijk (born 1952), English bodybuilder, professional sportsperson, actor and TV presenter
- Michael Vartan (born 1968), American actor
- Michael Ventura (born 1945), American novelist, film director, and cultural critic
- Michael Venus (born 1973), Canadian artist, actor and producer
- Michael Verhoeven (1938–2024), German film director
- Michael Vick (born 1980), American football player
- Michael Vlamis (born 1990), American actor, screenwriter, director, and producer
- Michael Voltaggio (born 1978), American celebrity chef, restaurateur, and author
- Michael Vosse (1941–2014), American journalist and A&M Records publicist

=== W ===
- Michael Wacha (born 1991), American baseball player
- Michael Wachter (1943–2022), American professor
- Michael Waldron (born 1987), American screenwriter and producer
- Michael Waltrip (born 1963), American race car driver and team owner
- Michael Wardlow (born 1988), American wrestler
- Michael Way (born 1980), American bassist and co-founder of My Chemical Romance.
- Michael Weatherly (born 1968), American actor, producer, director, and musician
- Michael Weisskopf (born 1946), American journalist
- Michael J. Weithorn, American writer, director, and producer
- Michael Wendler (born 1972), German singer
- Michael Wiander (born 1974), Swedish children's book author
- Michael Wilbon (born 1958), American sportswriter
- Michael Wincott (born 1958), Canadian actor
- Michael Winslow (born 1958), American actor, comedian, and beatboxer
- Michael J. Woodard (born 1997), American singer and actor
- Michael Woodbury (born 1975), American serial killer
- Michael-Leon Wooley (born 1971), American actor
- Michael Wortham (born 2002), American football player
- Michael H. Wray (born 1967), American politician

=== X ===
- Michael Xavier (born 1978), English actor and singer

=== Y ===
- Michael Yarwood (1941–2023), English impressionist, comedian and actor
- Michael Yeats (1921–2007), Irish politician
- Michael Ying (born 1949), Hong Kong businessman and philanthropist
- Michael Youssef (born 1948), Egyptian-American pastor

=== Z ===
- Michael Duane Zack III (1968–2023), American robber, murderer and sex offender
- Michael Zager (born 1943), American record producer, composer, and arranger of original music
- Michael Zakian (1957–2020), American art historian and museum curator
- Michael Zaslow (1942–1998), American actor
- Michael Zegen (born 1979), American actor
- Michael Zigomanis (born 1981), Canadian ice hockey player
- Michael Zinberg (born 1944), American television director, producer and writer
- Michael Zohary (1898–1983), Israeli botanist
- Michael Zorek (born 1960), American film and television actor

== Disambiguation pages ==
- Michael Abraham, multiple people
- Michael Adams, multiple people
- Michael Addison, multiple people
- Michael Adler, multiple people
- Michael Aguilar, multiple people
- Michael Ahern, multiple people
- Michael Aish, multiple people
- Michael Alexander, multiple people
- Michael Alford, multiple people
- Michael Allen, multiple people
- Michael Anderson, multiple people
- Michael Andersson, multiple people
- Michael Andrew, multiple people
- Michael Andrews, multiple people
- Michael Archer, multiple people
- Michael Armstrong, multiple people
- Michael Ash, multiple people
- Michael Asher, multiple people
- Michael Ashley, multiple people
- Michael Atkinson, multiple people
- Michael Austin, multiple people
- Michael Bacon, multiple people
- Michael Bailey, multiple people
- Michael Baird, multiple people
- Michael Ball, multiple people
- Michael Barnes, multiple people
- Michael Barnett, multiple people
- Michael Barrett, multiple people
- Michael Barry, multiple people
- Michael Bartlett, multiple people
- Michael Bates, multiple people
- Michael Bauman, multiple people
- Michael Baumann, multiple people
- Michael Beale, multiple people
- Michael Beattie, multiple people
- Michael Beck, multiple people
- Michael Bennett, multiple people
- Michael Berry, multiple people
- Michael Billington, multiple people
- Michael Bishop, multiple people
- Michael Black, multiple people
- Michael Blackburn, multiple people
- Michael Blackwood, multiple people
- Michael Blake, multiple people
- Michael Blakey, multiple people
- Michael Bond, multiple people
- Michael Booker, multiple people
- Michael Bowden, multiple people
- Michael Bowen, multiple people
- Michael Boyle, multiple people
- Michael Bradley, multiple people
- Michael Bradshaw, multiple people
- Michael Brady, multiple people
- Michael Brennan, multiple people
- Michael Briggs, multiple people
- Michael Brooks, multiple people
- Michael Brown, multiple people
- Michael Bryan, multiple people
- Michael Buckley, multiple people
- Michael Burgess, multiple people
- Michael Burke, multiple people
- Michael Burns, multiple people
- Michael Burrows, multiple people
- Michael Burton, multiple people
- Michael Byers, multiple people
- Michael Byrne, multiple people
- Michael Byrnes, multiple people
- Michael Cahill, multiple people
- Michael Cain, multiple people
- Michael Caine, multiple people
- Michael Caldwell, multiple people
- Michael Callahan, multiple people
- Michael Campbell, multiple people
- Michael Campion, multiple people
- Michael Canavan, multiple people
- Michael Capps, multiple people
- Michael Carey, multiple people
- Michael Carlin, multiple people
- Michael Carpenter, multiple people
- Michael Carr, multiple people
- Michael Carrington, multiple people
- Michael Carroll, multiple people
- Michael Carson, multiple people
- Michael Carter, multiple people
- Michael Caruso, multiple people
- Michael Casey, multiple people
- Michael Cassidy, multiple people
- Michael Castro, multiple people
- Michael Cavanagh, multiple people
- Michael Chadwick, multiple people
- Michael Chamberlin, multiple people
- Michael Chan, multiple people
- Michael Chandler, multiple people
- Michael Chaplin, multiple people
- Michael Chapman, multiple people
- Michael Cheng, multiple people
- Michael Cherry, multiple people
- Michael Choi, multiple people
- Michael Chow, multiple people
- Michael Christensen, multiple people
- Michael Christie, multiple people
- Michael Clark, multiple people
- Michael Clarke, multiple people
- Michael Clarkson, multiple people
- Michael Clayton, multiple people
- Michael Clifford, multiple people
- Michael Cohen, multiple people
- Michael Cole, multiple people
- Michael Coles, multiple people
- Michael Coletti, multiple people
- Michael Collins, multiple people
- Michael Conlan, multiple people
- Michael Connor, multiple people
- Michael Connors, multiple people
- Michael Cook, multiple people
- Michael Cooke, multiple people
- Michael Cooper, multiple people
- Michael Copeland, multiple people
- Michael Corcoran, multiple people
- Michael Costa, multiple people
- Michael Costello, multiple people
- Michael Costigan, multiple people
- Michael Coulson, multiple people
- Michael Cox, multiple people
- Michael Craig, multiple people
- Michael Crawford, multiple people
- Michael Crawley, multiple people
- Michael Creighton, multiple people
- Michael Cronin, multiple people
- Michael Cross, multiple people
- Michael Crow, multiple people
- Michael Crowe, multiple people
- Michael Crowley, multiple people
- Michael Cunningham, multiple people
- Michael Curley, multiple people
- Michael Currie, multiple people
- Michael Curry, multiple people
- Michael Curtis, multiple people
- Michael Daley, multiple people
- Michael Daly, multiple people
- Michael Darling, multiple people
- Michael David, multiple people
- Michael Davidson, multiple people
- Michael Davies, multiple people
- Michael Davis, multiple people
- Michael Davison, multiple people
- Michael Dawson, multiple people
- Michael Day, multiple people
- Michael Deacon, multiple people
- Michael Dean, multiple people
- Michael Deane, multiple people
- Michael Decker, multiple people
- Michael Delaney, multiple people
- Michael Dennis, multiple people
- Michael Devaney, multiple people
- Michael Devlin, multiple people
- Michael Diamond, multiple people
- Michael Dillon, multiple people
- Michael Dixon, multiple people
- Michael Dobson, multiple people
- Michael Donnellan, multiple people
- Michael Donovan, multiple people
- Michael Doran, multiple people
- Michael Douglas, multiple people
- Michael Dowling, multiple people
- Michael Duff, multiple people
- Michael Duffy, multiple people
- Michael Dugan, multiple people
- Michael Duignan, multiple people
- Michael Duncan, multiple people
- Michael Dunn, multiple people
- Michael Dunne, multiple people
- Michael Dwyer, multiple people
- Michael Earl, multiple people
- Michael East, multiple people
- Michael Edmonds, multiple people
- Michael Edwards, multiple people
- Michael Eggert, multiple people
- Michael Elliott, multiple people
- Michael Ellis, multiple people
- Michael Epstein, multiple people
- Michael Evans, multiple people
- Michael Fagan, multiple people
- Michael Falzon, multiple people
- Michael Farmer, multiple people
- Michael Farrell, multiple people
- Michael Farris, multiple people
- Michael Fay, multiple people
- Michael Fennelly, multiple people
- Michael Ferguson, multiple people
- Michael Fernandes, multiple people
- Michael Field, multiple people
- Michael Findlay, multiple people
- Michael Finnegan, multiple people
- Michael Finney, multiple people
- Michael Fish, multiple people
- Michael Fisher, multiple people
- Michael Fitzgerald, multiple people
- Michael Fitzpatrick, multiple people
- Michael Flaherty, multiple people
- Michael Flanagan, multiple people
- Michael Fleischer, multiple people
- Michael Flood, multiple people
- Michael Flowers, multiple people
- Michael Flynn, multiple people
- Michael Foot, multiple people
- Michael Forbes, multiple people
- Michael Ford, multiple people
- Michael Foreman, multiple people
- Michael Forster, multiple people
- Michael Forsyth, multiple people
- Michael Foster, multiple people
- Michael Fowler, multiple people
- Michael Fox, multiple people
- Michael France, multiple people
- Michael Francis, multiple people
- Michael Frank, multiple people
- Michael Franklin, multiple people
- Michael Franks, multiple people
- Michael Fraser, multiple people
- Michael Frederick, multiple people
- Michael Freedman, multiple people
- Michael Freeman, multiple people
- Michael French, multiple people
- Michael Frey, multiple people
- Michael Friedlander, multiple people
- Michael Friedman, multiple people
- Michael Fry, multiple people
- Michael Gallagher, multiple people
- Michael Galloway, multiple people
- Michael Garcia, multiple people
- Michael Garrison, multiple people
- Michael Gaughan, multiple people
- Michael George, multiple people
- Michael Gibbs, multiple people
- Michael Gilbert, multiple people
- Michael Gleason, multiple people
- Michael Glenn, multiple people
- Michael Glennon, multiple people
- Michael Goff, multiple people
- Michael Golden, multiple people
- Michael Golding, multiple people
- Michael Gomez, multiple people
- Michael Gonzales, multiple people
- Michael Gordon, multiple people
- Michael Gorman, multiple people
- Michael Gough, multiple people
- Michael Gould, multiple people
- Michael Grace, multiple people
- Michael Graham, multiple people
- Michael Grant, multiple people
- Michael Graves, multiple people
- Michael Greco, multiple people
- Michael Green, multiple people
- Michael Greene, multiple people
- Michael Greenfield, multiple people
- Michael Griffin, multiple people
- Michael Griffith, multiple people
- Michael Griffiths, multiple people
- Michael Grimm, multiple people
- Michael Gross, multiple people
- Michael Haas, multiple people
- Michael Hall, multiple people
- Michael Halliday, multiple people
- Michael Hamilton, multiple people
- Michael Hammer, multiple people
- Michael Hammond, multiple people
- Michael Hancock, multiple people
- Michael Hansen, multiple people
- Michael Hansson, multiple people
- Michael Hardy, multiple people
- Michael Hare, multiple people
- Michael Harper, multiple people
- Michael Harrington, multiple people
- Michael Harris, multiple people
- Michael Harrison, multiple people
- Michael Hart, multiple people
- Michael Hartmann, multiple people
- Michael Harvey, multiple people
- Michael Harwood, multiple people
- Michael Hastings, multiple people
- Michael Hawkins, multiple people
- Michael Hayden, multiple people
- Michael Hayes, multiple people
- Michael Hearn, multiple people
- Michael Heath, multiple people
- Michael Heller, multiple people
- Michael Henderson, multiple people
- Michael Herman, multiple people
- Michael Hickey, multiple people
- Michael Hicks, multiple people
- Michael Higgins, multiple people
- Michael Hill, multiple people
- Michael Hills, multiple people
- Michael Hirsh, multiple people
- Michael Hirst, multiple people
- Michael Hoey, multiple people
- Michael Hoffman, multiple people
- Michael Hofmann, multiple people
- Michael Hogan, multiple people
- Michael Hogg, multiple people
- Michael Holland, multiple people
- Michael Hollingsworth, multiple people
- Michael Holman, multiple people
- Michael Holt, multiple people
- Michael Hooper, multiple people
- Michael Horowitz, multiple people
- Michael Horton, multiple people
- Michael Hough, multiple people
- Michael Houghton, multiple people
- Michael Houser, multiple people
- Michael Howard, multiple people
- Michael Howe, multiple people
- Michael Huang, multiple people
- Michael Hubbard, multiple people
- Michael Huber, multiple people
- Michael Hudson, multiple people
- Michael Huey, multiple people
- Michael Hughes, multiple people
- Michael Hull, multiple people
- Michael Humphreys, multiple people
- Michael Hunt, multiple people
- Michael Hunter, multiple people
- Michael Hurley, multiple people
- Michael Hutchings, multiple people
- Michael Hutchinson, multiple people
- Michael Irwin, multiple people
- Michael Jackson, multiple people
- Michael Jacobs, multiple people
- Michael James, multiple people
- Michael Jefferson, multiple people
- Michael Jeffery, multiple people
- Michael Jeffries, multiple people
- Michael Jenkins, multiple people
- Michael Jennings, multiple people
- Michael Jensen, multiple people
- Michael John, multiple people
- Michael Johns, multiple people
- Michael Johnson, multiple people
- Michael Johnston, multiple people
- Michael Jones, multiple people
- Michael Jordan, multiple people
- Michael Joy, multiple people
- Michael Kagan, multiple people
- Michael Kahn, multiple people
- Michael Kaiser, multiple people
- Michael Kane, multiple people
- Michael Kaplan, multiple people
- Michael Katz, multiple people
- Michael Kaufman, multiple people
- Michael Kay, multiple people
- Michael Keane, multiple people
- Michael Kearney, multiple people
- Michael Kearns, multiple people
- Michael Keating, multiple people
- Michael Kelly, multiple people
- Michael Kenna, multiple people
- Michael Kennedy, multiple people
- Michael Kenny, multiple people
- Michael Kent, multiple people
- Michael Kim, multiple people
- Michael King, multiple people
- Michael Kirby, multiple people
- Michael Kirwan, multiple people
- Michael Klein, multiple people
- Michael Knight, multiple people
- Michael Knowles, multiple people
- Michael Knox, multiple people
- Michael Kramer, multiple people
- Michael Kruger, multiple people
- Michael Lally, multiple people
- Michael Lamb, multiple people
- Michael Lane, multiple people
- Michael Larsen, multiple people
- Michael Larson, multiple people
- Michael Leach, multiple people
- Michael Leahy, multiple people
- Michael Leavitt, multiple people
- Michael Lee, multiple people
- Michael Legge, multiple people
- Michael Leigh, multiple people
- Michael Leighton, multiple people
- Michael Lennon, multiple people
- Michael Leonard, multiple people
- Michael Lerner, multiple people
- Michael Levin, multiple people
- Michael Levine, multiple people
- Michael Levitt, multiple people
- Michael Levy, multiple people
- Michael Lewis, multiple people
- Michael Lin, multiple people
- Michael Lindsay, multiple people
- Michael Little, multiple people
- Michael Llewellyn, multiple people
- Michael Lloyd, multiple people
- Michael Lockshin, multiple people
- Michael Lockwood, multiple people
- Michael Logan, multiple people
- Michael Lomax, multiple people
- Michael Lombardi, multiple people
- Michael Long, multiple people
- Michael Lorenz, multiple people
- Michael Love, multiple people
- Michael Lowry, multiple people
- Michael Lucas, multiple people
- Michael Lynch, multiple people
- Michael MacDonald, multiple people
- Michael MacKenzie, multiple people
- Michael Madden, multiple people
- Michael Madsen, multiple people
- Michael Magee, multiple people
- Michael Maguire, multiple people
- Michael Maher, multiple people
- Michael Mahoney, multiple people
- Michael Malone, multiple people
- Michael Manley, multiple people
- Michael Mann, multiple people
- Michael Manning, multiple people
- Michael Mansfield, multiple people
- Michael Manson, multiple people
- Michael Marcus, multiple people
- Michael Mark, multiple people
- Michael Marks, multiple people
- Michael Marra, multiple people
- Michael Marsh, multiple people
- Michael Marshall, multiple people
- Michael Marten, multiple people
- Michael Martin, multiple people
- Michael Martinez, multiple people
- Michael Martyn, multiple people
- Michael Maskell, multiple people
- Michael Mason, multiple people
- Michael Massey, multiple people
- Michael Masters, multiple people
- Michael Matheson, multiple people
- Michael Matthews, multiple people
- Michael May, multiple people
- Michael Mayer, multiple people
- Michael Maynard, multiple people
- Michael Mayo, multiple people
- Michael McAllister, multiple people
- Michael McAuliffe, multiple people
- Michael McBride, multiple people
- Michael McCabe, multiple people
- Michael McCafferty, multiple people
- Michael McCann, multiple people
- Michael McCarthy, multiple people
- Michael McConnell, multiple people
- Michael McCord, multiple people
- Michael McCormack, multiple people
- Michael McCormick, multiple people
- Michael McCoy, multiple people
- Michael McCullough, multiple people
- Michael McDermott, multiple people
- Michael McDonald, multiple people
- Michael McDowell, multiple people
- Michael McElroy, multiple people
- Michael McEwen, multiple people
- Michael McFadden, multiple people
- Michael McFarland, multiple people
- Michael McFarlane, multiple people
- Michael McGee, multiple people
- Michael McGinnis, multiple people
- Michael McGlinchey, multiple people
- Michael McGlynn, multiple people
- Michael McGoldrick, multiple people
- Michael McGovern, multiple people
- Michael McGowan, multiple people
- Michael McGrath, multiple people
- Michael McGuire, multiple people
- Michael McHugh, multiple people
- Michael McIntyre, multiple people
- Michael McKay, multiple people
- Michael McKenna, multiple people
- Michael McLaughlin, multiple people
- Michael McLean, multiple people
- Michael McLeod, multiple people
- Michael McMahon, multiple people
- Michael McManus, multiple people
- Michael McNamara, multiple people
- Michael McNulty, multiple people
- Michael McShane, multiple people
- Michael Meeks, multiple people
- Michael Mercer, multiple people
- Michael Meredith, multiple people
- Michael Merritt, multiple people
- Michael Meyer, multiple people
- Michael Meyers, multiple people
- Michael Middleton, multiple people
- Michael Miles, multiple people
- Michael Miller, multiple people
- Michael Mills, multiple people
- Michael Milton, multiple people
- Michael Mitchell, multiple people
- Michael Moffat, multiple people
- Michael Molloy, multiple people
- Michael Monroe, multiple people
- Michael Montgomery, multiple people
- Michael Moon, multiple people
- Michael Mooney, multiple people
- Michael Moore, multiple people
- Michael Morales, multiple people
- Michael Moran, multiple people
- Michael Morgan, multiple people
- Michael Moriarty, multiple people
- Michael Morley, multiple people
- Michael Moroney, multiple people
- Michael Morris, multiple people
- Michael Morrison, multiple people
- Michael Morrissey, multiple people
- Michael Morton, multiple people
- Michael Moseley, multiple people
- Michael Mosley, multiple people
- Michael Mulcahy, multiple people
- Michael Mullen, multiple people
- Michael Muller, multiple people
- Michael Mullins, multiple people
- Michael Murphy, multiple people
- Michael Murray, multiple people
- Michael Myers, multiple people
- Michael Nash, multiple people
- Michael Nelson, multiple people
- Michael Newton, multiple people
- Michael Nichols, multiple people
- Michael Nielsen, multiple people
- Michael Nugent, multiple people
- Michael O'Brien, multiple people
- Michael O'Callaghan, multiple people
- Michael O'Connell, multiple people
- Michael O'Connor, multiple people
- Michael O'Dea, multiple people
- Michael O'Doherty, multiple people
- Michael O'Donnell, multiple people
- Michael O'Farrell, multiple people
- Michael O'Flaherty, multiple people
- Michael O'Gorman, multiple people
- Michael O'Halloran, multiple people
- Michael O'Hanlon, multiple people
- Michael O'Hara, multiple people
- Michael O'Higgins, multiple people
- Michael Ojo, multiple people
- Michael O'Keefe, multiple people
- Michael O'Leary, multiple people
- Michael Oldfield, multiple people
- Michael Oliver, multiple people
- Michael O'Neill, multiple people
- Michael O'Regan, multiple people
- Michael O'Reilly, multiple people
- Michael O'Rourke, multiple people
- Michael Osborne, multiple people
- Michael O'Shea, multiple people
- Michael Ostrowski, multiple people
- Michael O'Sullivan, multiple people
- Michael Owen, multiple people
- Michael Owens, multiple people
- Michael Page, multiple people
- Michael Palmer, multiple people
- Michael Park, multiple people
- Michael Parker, multiple people
- Michael Parkinson, multiple people
- Michael Parks, multiple people
- Michael Parsons, multiple people
- Michael Paterson, multiple people
- Michael Patterson, multiple people
- Michael Paul, multiple people
- Michael Payne, multiple people
- Michael Peacock, multiple people
- Michael Pearce, multiple people
- Michael Pearson, multiple people
- Michael Pedersen, multiple people
- Michael Penn, multiple people
- Michael Perelman, multiple people
- Michael Perez, multiple people
- Michael Perkins, multiple people
- Michael Perry, multiple people
- Michael Peters, multiple people
- Michael Petersen, multiple people
- Michael Peterson, multiple people
- Michael Phelps, multiple people
- Michael Phillips, multiple people
- Michael Pierce, multiple people
- Michael Pittman, multiple people
- Michael Pitts, multiple people
- Michael Pollack, multiple people
- Michael Pollard, multiple people
- Michael Pollock, multiple people
- Michael Potts, multiple people
- Michael Powell, multiple people
- Michael Pratt, multiple people
- Michael Preston, multiple people
- Michael Quigley, multiple people
- Michael Quinlan, multiple people
- Michael Quinn, multiple people
- Michael Ramos, multiple people
- Michael Ramsey, multiple people
- Michael Randall, multiple people
- Michael Rank, multiple people
- Michael Ray, multiple people
- Michael Raynor, multiple people
- Michael Reagan, multiple people
- Michael Redman, multiple people
- Michael Redmond, multiple people
- Michael Reed, multiple people
- Michael Reeves, multiple people
- Michael Regan, multiple people
- Michael Reid, multiple people
- Michael Reilly, multiple people
- Michael Reynolds, multiple people
- Michael Rhodes, multiple people
- Michael Rice, multiple people
- Michael Rich, multiple people
- Michael Richard, multiple people
- Michael Richards, multiple people
- Michael Richardson, multiple people
- Michael Richey, multiple people
- Michael Riley, multiple people
- Michael Ritchie, multiple people
- Michael Roach, multiple people
- Michael Roberts, multiple people
- Michael Robertson, multiple people
- Michael Robinson, multiple people
- Michael Roche, multiple people
- Michael Rodgers, multiple people
- Michael Rodrigues, multiple people
- Michael Rodríguez, multiple people
- Michael Rogers, multiple people
- Michael Roll, multiple people
- Michael Rose, multiple people
- Michael Rosen, multiple people
- Michael Ross, multiple people
- Michael Rossi, multiple people
- Michael Roth, multiple people
- Michael Rubin, multiple people
- Michael Rucker, multiple people
- Michael Russell, multiple people
- Michael Ryan, multiple people
- Michael Sadler, multiple people
- Michael Sanchez, multiple people
- Michael Sanders, multiple people
- Michael Sauer, multiple people
- Michael Saunders, multiple people
- Michael Savage, multiple people
- Michael Schaefer, multiple people
- Michael Schick, multiple people
- Michael Schmid, multiple people
- Michael Schmidt, multiple people
- Michael Schneider, multiple people
- Michael Schofield, multiple people
- Michael Schulte, multiple people
- Michael Schwartz, multiple people
- Michael Scott, multiple people
- Michael Sellers, multiple people
- Michael Shalhoub, multiple people
- Michael Shanks, multiple people
- Michael Shannon, multiple people
- Michael Sharp, multiple people
- Michael Sharpe, multiple people
- Michael Shaw, multiple people
- Michael Shea, multiple people
- Michael Shelley, multiple people
- Michael Shields, multiple people
- Michael Silver, multiple people
- Michael Simmons, multiple people
- Michael Simms, multiple people
- Michael Simon, multiple people
- Michael Simpson, multiple people
- Michael Smith, multiple people
- Michael Smithson, multiple people
- Michael Smyth, multiple people
- Michael Snyder, multiple people
- Michael Sommer, multiple people
- Michael Spence, multiple people
- Michael Spencer, multiple people
- Michael Stanley, multiple people
- Michael Stearns, multiple people
- Michael Steel, multiple people
- Michael Steele, multiple people
- Michael Stephens, multiple people
- Michael Stephenson, multiple people
- Michael Sterling, multiple people
- Michael Stern, multiple people
- Michael Stevens, multiple people
- Michael Stewart, multiple people
- Michael Stone, multiple people
- Michael Strachan, multiple people
- Michael Stuart, multiple people
- Michael Sullivan, multiple people
- Michael Summers, multiple people
- Michael Sutton, multiple people
- Michael Sweet, multiple people
- Michael Talbot, multiple people
- Michael Taylor, multiple people
- Michael Terry, multiple people
- Michael Thomas, multiple people
- Michael Thompson, multiple people
- Michael Thomson, multiple people
- Michael Tierney, multiple people
- Michael Tucker, multiple people
- Michael Turner, multiple people
- Michael Tyler, multiple people
- Michael Tyson, multiple people
- Michael Vaughn, multiple people
- Michael Vickers, multiple people
- Michael Vincent, multiple people
- Michael Waddell, multiple people
- Michael Wade, multiple people
- Michael Wagner, multiple people
- Michael Wainwright, multiple people
- Michael Walker, multiple people
- Michael Wall, multiple people
- Michael Wallace, multiple people
- Michael Walsh, multiple people
- Michael Walters, multiple people
- Michael Wang, multiple people
- Michael Ward, multiple people
- Michael Warren, multiple people
- Michael Washington, multiple people
- Michael Waters, multiple people
- Michael Watson, multiple people
- Michael Watt, multiple people
- Michael Watts, multiple people
- Michael Waugh, multiple people
- Michael Weaver, multiple people
- Michael Webber, multiple people
- Michael Weber, multiple people
- Michael Webster, multiple people
- Michael Weir, multiple people
- Michael Weiss, multiple people
- Michael Welch, multiple people
- Michael Welsh, multiple people
- Michael West, multiple people
- Michael Weston, multiple people
- Michael Wheeler, multiple people
- Michael White, multiple people
- Michael Wiley, multiple people
- Michael Wilkins, multiple people
- Michael Wilkinson, multiple people
- Michael Williams, multiple people
- Michael Williamson, multiple people
- Michael Willis, multiple people
- Michael Wilson, multiple people
- Michael Winter, multiple people
- Michael Winters, multiple people
- Michael Wise, multiple people
- Michael Wolf, multiple people
- Michael Wolfe, multiple people
- Michael Wolff, multiple people
- Michael Wong, multiple people
- Michael Wood, multiple people
- Michael Woods, multiple people
- Michael Woodward, multiple people
- Michael Wright, multiple people
- Michael Yates, multiple people
- Michael York, multiple people
- Michael Young, multiple people
- Michael Zimmerman, multiple people

== Fictional characters ==
- Michael Bluth, a character and protagonist from the American TV sitcom Arrested Development
- Michael Burnham, a character from Star Trek: Discovery
- Michael Cambias, a character in the American daytime drama All My Children
- Michael Corinthos, a character in the American daytime drama General Hospital
- Michael Corleone, from The Godfather
- Michael Culhane, a character from the 1981 American prime time television soap opera Dynasty
- Michael Dundee, the main character and protagonist from the Crocodile Dundee film series
- Michael Emerson, a character from the TV series The Lost Boys
- Michael Ehrmantraut, a character from Breaking Bad and Better Call Saul
- Michael Guerin, one of the four main protagonists of the American TV series Roswell
- Michael Kelso, a character from the American TV series That '70s Show
- Michael McBain, character from the ABC soap opera One Life to Live
- Michael Robinavitch, in the American medical drama TV series The Pitt
- Michael Scofield, one of the two main protagonists of the American TV series Prison Break
- Michael Shayne, private detective character created during the late 1930s by writer Brett Halliday
- Michael Stivic, a character played by Rob Reiner, in the 1970s American television sitcom All in the Family
- Michael Wazowski, a character from the animated Monsters, Inc. film franchise

== See also ==
- List of people with given name Mikhail
- Michael (disambiguation)
- Mick, includes list of people named Mick
- Mike, includes list of people named Mike
- Mychal, includes list of people named Mychal
- Micheal, includes list of people named Micheal
