= Michael Cheng =

Michael Cheng may refer to:

- Michael Cheng (businessman), Canadian businessman
- Michael Cheng (windsurfer) (born 1994), Hong Kong windsurfer
- Michael Cheng (politician) (1938–2026), member of the Legislative Council of Hong Kong
