= Michael Mooney =

Michael Mooney may refer to:

== Sportspeople ==
- Mike Mooney (American football) (1969–2007), National Football League player
- Michael Mooney (sailor) (1930–1985), American sailor, Olympic champion from 1948

== Others ==
- Michael Mooney, writer of the Twitter worm, Mikeyy, from April 2009
- Michael Mooney, former member of the English rock band Spiritualized
