= Mike Capps =

Mike Capps may refer to:

- Michael Capps (politician), American politician
- Mike Capps (executive), former president of Epic Games
- Mike Capps (sportscaster), minor league baseball radio broadcaster and former news anchor and reporter
