= Mike Randall =

Mike or Michael Randall may refer to:

- Mike Randall (journalist) (1919–1999), British newspaper editor
- Mike Randall (entertainer) (born 1953), American actor and meteorologist
- Mike Randall (skier) (born 1962), American Nordic combined skier
- Michael Randall, musician with Blackhawk
