= Michael Canavan =

Michael Canavan may refer to:

- Michael Canavan (general) (1946–2026), U.S. Army general and Federal Aviation Administration security official
- Michael Canavan (politician) (1924–2026), Irish politician and businessman
- Michael Noel Canavan (born 1958), Irish Garda officer
- Michael Canavan (actor), American actor; see First Flight (Star Trek: Enterprise)
