= Michael Bidner =

Canadian graphuc artist and painter

Michael Bidner (1944-1989) was a Canadian graphic artist and painter noted for his use of xerox and microfilm technology. He was from London, Ontario.

== Career ==
Bidner was an early proponent of the zine movement and was deeply involved with the gay community and punk scene in Canada. Around 1970, Bidner began exhibiting and working with printed graphics, ultimately incorporating photographs, slides, video, photocopies and even faxes in his work. In 1972, he founded Cloud Productions, a mail art style artist publication project in Vancouver, B.C. He then briefly taught art at Fanshawe College in London, Ontario in 1973. Around that time, he is said to have gotten the first colour Xerox machine in Canada, which he used to host a printing party at the McIntosh Gallery at Western University. In 1981, he began focusing on artistamps (a term he coined) and miniature art, ultimately organizing his first artistamp exhibition, entitled “Artistampex," in 1984.

Bidner was cataloguing his large collection of mail artistamps when he died of AIDS in 1989. The project was completed posthumously as a tribute.
