= Michael Humphreys =

Michael Humphreys may refer to:

- Michael Humphreys (MP) (died 1626), MP for Dorchester, England
- Michael Conner Humphreys (born 1985), American actor
- Mike Humphreys (born 1967), American Major League Baseball player

== See also ==
- Humphreys (surname)
