= Michael McGinnis =

Michael McGinnis may refer to:

- J. Michael McGinnis (born 1944), physician and public health scholar
- Mike McGinnis (born 1973), American saxophonist, clarinetist, and composer
- Michael McGinnis, American teacher and sculptor, creator of the 3D labyrinth game Perplexus

== See also ==
- Michael McGinniss, President of La Salle University
