= Michael Christensen =

Michael Christensen may refer to:

- Michael Christensen (architect) (born 1960), Danish architect, founder of Christensen & Co
- Michael Christensen (racing driver) (born 1990), Danish racing driver
- Michael Færk Christensen (born 1986), Danish racing cyclist
- Michael Christensen (footballer) (born 1983), Danish football player
- Michael Christensen, participant in 2003 of Danish Idols

== See also ==
- Michael Christiansen (1926–1984), British newspaper editor
