= Michael Hardy =

Michael Hardy may refer to:

- Hardy (singer) (Michael Wilson Hardy, born 1990), American country musician
- Michael Hardy (attorney) (1955–2024), American civil rights lawyer
