= Michael Farris =

Michael Farris may refer to:

- Michael Farris (lawyer), American constitutional lawyer
- Mike Farris (musician), American musician
