= Michael Fleischer =

Michael Fleischer may refer to:

- Michael Paul Fleischer, American businessman
- Michael Fleischer (mineralogist) (1908–1998), American mineralogist, first chairman of the IMA-CMNMC
- Michael Fleisher (1942–2018), American comic writer
