= Michael Preston (disambiguation) =

Michael Preston (1933–2026) was an English film actor and singer.

Michael Preston may also refer to:

- Michael Preston (American football) (born 1989), American football wide receiver
- Michael Preston (author), writer under the pen name Alex Rutherford
- Michael Preston (footballer) (born 1977), English footballer
- Michael J. Preston, American academic
- Mike Preston (curler) (1944–2009), Welsh wheelchair curler
