= Michael McCabe =

Michael McCabe may refer to:

- Michael McCabe (artist) (1961–2023), Diné (Navajo) artist and master printmaker
- W. Michael McCabe, American politician
- Mike McCabe, political reform activist in Wisconsin
