= Mike Leach =

Mike Leach may refer to:

- Mike Leach (American football coach) (1961–2022), American college football head coach
- Mike Leach (long snapper) (born 1976), American football long snapper
- Mike Leach (tennis) (born 1960), tennis player

== See also ==
- Mick Leach (1947–1992), English soccer player
