= Michael Ojo =

Michael Ojo may refer to:

- Michael Ojo (basketball, born 1993) (1993–2020), Nigerian-American basketball player who played collegiately at Florida State and professionally in Serbia
- Michael Ojo (basketball, born 1989), Nigerian-American basketball player who played collegiately at Lehigh and professionally in Europe
