= Michael Duignan =

Michael Duignan may refer to:

- Michael Duignan (hurler) (born 1968), Irish former GAA player and current chairman of the Offaly County Board
- Michael Duignan (bishop) (born 1970), Irish Irish Roman Catholic prelate, current Bishop of Clonfert and Galway and Kilmacduagh
