= Michael Coulson =

Michael Coulson may refer to:

- Michael Coulson (barrister) (1927–2002), British barrister, judge and politician
- Michael Coulson (footballer) (born 1988), English footballer
