= Michael Raynor =

Michael Raynor may refer to:

- Michael E. Raynor (born 1967), Canadian writer and expert on business management practices
- Michael A. Raynor (born 1962), American diplomat
- Michael Raynor (actor), American actor, director and writer
- Michael Raynor (born 1981)

Mayor of Empire AL,
