= Michael Perkins =

Michael Perkins may refer to:

- Michael J. Perkins (1899–1918), US Army soldier
- Michael Perkins (poet) (born 1942), American poet
- Mike Perkins (born 1970), British comic book artist
- M Ross Perkins (born 1987), American songwriter
