= Michael Love (disambiguation) =

Mike Love is an American singer/songwriter who co-founded the Beach Boys.

Michael Love may also refer to:

- Michael Love (footballer) (born 1973), English footballer
- Michael James Love, screenwriter, filmmaker
- Mike Love (American football) (born 1994), American football defensive end
- Mike Love (reggae musician), Hawaiian reggae musician
