= Michael McGovern =

Michael McGovern may refer to:

- Michael McGovern (footballer) (born 1984), association football player from Northern Ireland
- Michael McGovern (poet) (1848–1933), Irish-American poet
- Michael G. McGovern (born 1964), American Catholic bishop
