= Michael Glenn =

Michael Glenn may refer to:

- Michael Glenn (cricketer) (born 1956), English cricketer
- Mike Glenn (born 1955), American basketball player

== See also ==
- Michael Glenn Williams (born 1957), American composer, pianist, and technologist
