= Michael O'Rourke =

Michael, Mick or Mike O'Rourke is the name of:

- Michael O'Rourke (gambler) (1862–1882, alias "Johnny-Behind-the-Deuce"), professional gambler of the Old West
- Michael James O'Rourke (1878–1957), Canadian recipient of the Victoria Cross
- Mick O'Rourke (1946–2019), Irish Gaelic footballer and hurler who played for Offaly
- Mike O'Rourke (athlete) (born 1955), New Zealand javelin thrower
- Mike O'Rourke (baseball) (1868–1934), Major League Baseball pitcher
