= Mike Capps (sportscaster) =

American radio broadcaster

- Occupation: Sports radio broadcaster

Mike Capps is an American minor league baseball radio broadcaster and former news anchor and reporter. Since 2000, he has been the Director of Broadcasting and play-by-play announcer for the Round Rock Express, the Triple-A affiliate of the Texas Rangers based in Round Rock, Texas.

Capps spent part of his career as a reporter, bureau chief, and executive sports director for WFAA-TV in Dallas/Fort Worth, Texas. He worked as an assignments manager and deputy bureau chief for ABC News in St. Louis and as a weekend anchor for KPRC-TV in Houston. While working for CNN, he covered the Gulf War as well as the Waco Siege, which garnered him an Emmy Nomination and a CableACE Award.
