= Mike Randall (skier) =

American Nordic combined skier (born 1962)

Mike Randall (born March 27, 1962) is a retired American Nordic combined skier who competed in the 1984 Winter Olympics. He finished 28th overall in the event.
