= Michael Booker (disambiguation) =

Michael Booker (born 1975) is a former NFL cornerback. Michael Booker may also refer to:

- Michael Booker (figure skater) (born 1937), former British figure skater
- Michael Booker, American football player for the 2014 Detroit Thunder season
- Mike Booker (born 1947), English footballer
- Michael Dennis Booker, lawyer and former state legislator in Arkansas
