= Michael Dowling =

Michael Dowling may refer to:

- Michael Dowling, author who writes under the pseudonym Tobias Druitt
- Michael Dowling (footballer) (1889–?), English footballer
- Michael J. Dowling, president and chief executive officer of Northwell Health
- Michael J. Dowling (politician) (1866–1921), Minnesota politician
- Michael Dowling (scholar), American scholar
- Mick Dowling (born 1946), Irish former Olympic boxer
