= Michael McIntyre (disambiguation) =

Michael McIntyre (born 1976) is an English comedian

Michael McIntyre may also refer to:

- Michael E. McIntyre (born 1941), professor of atmospheric dynamics
- Michael McIntyre (sailor) (born 1956), British sailor and Olympic champion
- Michael McIntyre (cricketer) (1839–1888), English cricketer
- Mike McIntyre (born 1956), American politician
