= Michael Lally =

Michael Lally may refer to:

- Mícheál Lally (born 1939), Irish writer and historian
- Michael Lally (brigadier-general) (1714–1773), Irish soldier
- Michael Lally (poet) (born 1942), American-born poet and author
- Mike Lally, American college football player
- Mick Lally, Irish actor
