= Michael Willis =

Michael Willis may refer to:

- Michael Willis (actor), (born 1949), American actor
- Michael Willis (minister) (1799–1879), Scottish minister
- Michael D. Willis, Indologist and historian
- Mike Willis (baseball) (born 1950), American baseball player
- Mike Willis (American football) (born 1991), American college football coach
