= Michael Sauer =

Michael Sauer is the name of:

- Michael T. Sauer (born 1937), Los Angeles County Superior Court judge
- Michael Sauer (triple jumper) (born 1941), German triple jumper
- Michael Sauer (ice hockey) (born 1987), American ice hockey defenseman
