= Mike Archer =

Mike or Michael Archer may refer to:

- Mike Archer (cricketer)
- Mike Archer (American football) (born 1953), American football coach
- Mike Archer (paleontologist) (born 1945), former director of the Australian Museum
- Michael Eugene Archer, stage name D'Angelo (1974–2025), American singer-songwriter and record producer
- Michael Archer, a character from the 1997 film Face/Off
