= Michael Spence (disambiguation) =

Michael Spence is an American-born economist and winner of the 2001 Nobel Memorial Prize in Economic Sciences

Michael Spence may also refer to:

- Michael Spence (legal scholar) (born 1962), Australian-born academic and current president and provost of University College London
- Michael Spence (Holby City), a character in the BBC medical drama Holby City
- Michael Spence, American steeplechase runner, participated in Athletics at the 2007 Pan American Games
- Michael Spence (rugby league) (born 1988), rugby league player for the Brisbane Broncos
- Mike Spence (1936–1968), British racing driver
