= Michael Choi =

Michael Choi may refer to:

- Michael Choi (comics), comic book artist
- Michael Choi (politician) (born 1959), Australian politician
- Michael Choi (Brookside), a character in Brookside
- Michael Choi (racing driver) (born 1968), Hong Kong racing driver and businessman
