= Michael Woodward =

Michael Woodward may refer to:

- Michael J. Woodard (born 1997), American singer and actor
- Michael Woodward, British priest tortured aboard the Chilean naval vessel Esmeralda
- Michael Woodward (academic) (1602–1675), English educational administrator
