= Michael Billington =

Michael Billington may refer to:

- Michael Billington (actor) (1941–2005), British film and television actor
- Michael Billington (critic) (born 1939), British author and arts critic
- Michael Billington (activist), author and activist in the LaRouche movement
