= Michael Rubin =

Michael Rubin may refer to:

- Michael Rubin (author) (born 1963), American author and businessman
- Michael Rubin (composer) (born 1963), American composer
- Michael Rubin (historian) (born 1971), American defense expert
- Michael Rubin (businessman) (born 1972), American businessman, CEO of Fanatics, founder and CEO of GSI, former co-owner of the Philadelphia 76ers
