= Michael McShane =

Michael McShane may refer to:

- Michael J. McShane, American judge
- Mike McShane, American actor and comedian
- Mike McShane (ice hockey), American ice hockey coach
