= Michael Phelps (disambiguation) =

Michael Phelps (born 1985) is an American retired Olympic swimmer.

Michael Phelps may also refer to:

- Michael E. Phelps (born 1939), American co-developer of positron emission tomography
- Mike Phelps (born 1961), American basketball player
- Michael Phelps (racing driver) (born 1988), American stock car racing driver
