= Michael Chow =

Michael Chow may refer to:

- Michael Chow (restaurateur) (born 1939), restaurateur and part-time actor
- Michael Chow (actor) (born 1960), Hong Kong–based actor
