= Michael Tarry =

Canadian singer (d.2013)

Michael Terry McDermott (died April 15, 2013) - better known as Michael Tarry - was a popular singer in Canada in the 1970s.

Born in Manchester, England, McDermott moved to Canada in 1958. He was a member of two groups: "Susan Taylor and the Paytons", and "Milestone". In 1969, he signed with Columbia Records. As Michael Tarry, he was best known for his 1973 hit "Rosalie".

McDermott died on April 15, 2013.

== Singles ==
- All That I Love (1968) Columbia C4-2848 (#92 CAN) (#5 CanCon)
- If You Believe (1969) Columbia C4-2863 (#7 CanCon)
- Neighbours At The Zoo / A Dime's Worth (1969) Columbia C4-2877
- What's Your Name? / The Earth Ran Away With The Moon (1969) Columbia C4-2878
- Sometimes You're Up (1970) Columbia C4-2922
- Rosalie (1973) WEA Records Reprise CR4017 (#8 CAN) (#39 CanCountry) (#6 CanAC)
- Forgotten Man (1973) Reprise CR4020 (#52 CanAC)
- Memories (1974) Reprise CR4024 (#13 CanAC)

== Albums ==
- Michael Tarry (1973) Reprise RSC 8007 (#87 Can)
