= Michael Caruso =

Michael or Mike Caruso may refer to:

- Michael Caruso (editor), former editor-in-chief of the Smithsonian magazine who coined the term "elevator pitch"
- Michael Caruso (ice hockey) (born 1988), Canadian professional ice hockey defenceman
- Michael Caruso (musician) (born 1954), American singer-songwriter
- Michael Caruso (racing driver) (born 1983), Australian professional racing driver
- Mike Caruso (baseball) (born 1977), former Major League Baseball shortstop
- Mike Caruso (politician) (born 1958), member of the Florida Legislature
