= Michael Duncan =

Michael Duncan may refer to:

- Michael Clarke Duncan (1957–2012), American actor
- Mike Duncan (politician) (born 1951), chairman of the Republican National Committee
- Mike Duncan (podcaster) (born 1980), American podcaster
- Mike Duncan (racing driver) (born 1962), American stock car racing driver
