= Michael Byers =

Michael Byers may refer to:

- Michael Byers (American academic), American writer and professor of English
- Michael Byers (Canadian author), professor at the University of British Columbia, and expert on international law
- Michael Byers (actor), actor from Northern Ireland
- Mike Byers (1946–2010), ice hockey player
