= Michael Penn (disambiguation) =

Michael Penn (born 1958) is an American singer, songwriter, and composer.

Michael Penn may also refer to:

- Michael Penn (author), professor of religious studies
- Mike Penn (born 1989), rugby union player
