= Michael Cheng (businessman) =

Canadian entrepreneur

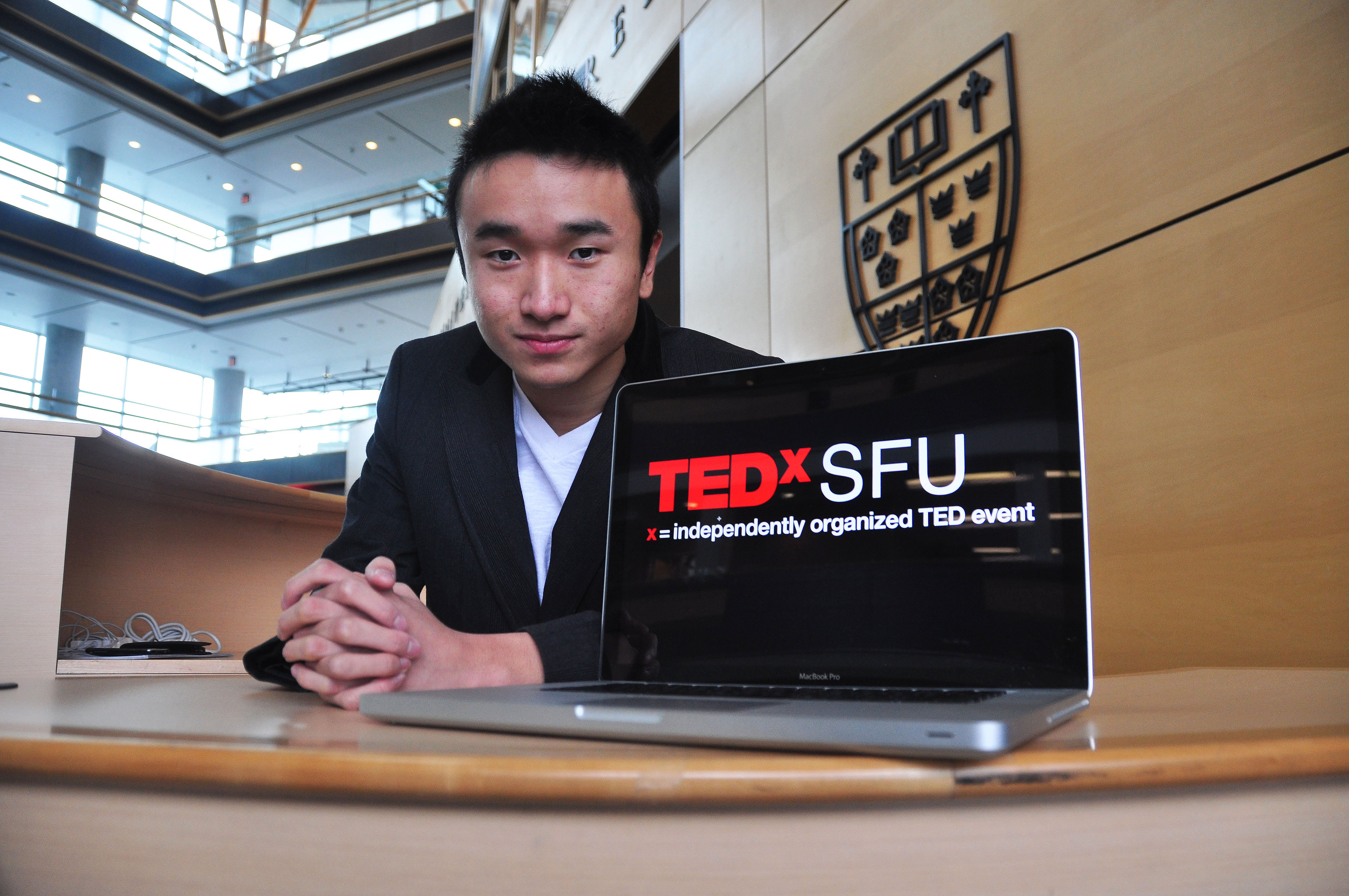
- Born: Hong Kong, China
- Education: Simon Fraser University
- Occupation: Entrepreneur

Michael Cheng is a Canadian entrepreneur. Cheng co-founded Lumen5, Sniply, Beta Collective, Covr, Needle HR, WittyCookie, TEDxSFU, and 12 other ventures.

== Early life and education ==
Cheng was born an only child in Hong Kong and moved to Vancouver, British Columbia at the age of 7. While in high school Cheng started a business called Auto Quick Trade. Cheng studied Interactive Arts and Technology at Simon Fraser University (SFU) and was "offered a lecturer's position, teaching digital design" during his freshman year.

== Career ==
In 2009, Cheng co-founded International Student Connection, an international student agency that was named "Best New Student Business of the Year".

In 2011, Cheng launched TEDxSFU, an annual TEDx event at Simon Fraser University. That year, Cheng also co-founded WittyCookie which offers website creation and maintenance to small businesses.

In 2012, Cheng was selected by the Surrey Board of Trade as one of the "Top 25 Under 25" entrepreneurs. He was also given the "SFU Entrepreneur of the Year" award and the "Surrey Business Excellence Award".

In 2013, Cheng co-founded Needle HR, an Internet marketplace for web designers and other creative services. Cheng received "The Satchu Prize" and "Outstanding Venture Award" from educational organization, The Next 36. and was selected by Maclean's Magazine as one of the "Future Leaders of Canada". He was also selected by 24 Hours as one of "Top 24 Under 24".

In 2014, Cheng co-founded Covr, a music discovery platform, and was selected by BCBusiness as one of "Top 30 Under 30". That year, Cheng also co-founded Beta Collective, the first Coworking space in Surrey, British Columbia, as well as Sniply, an online marketing tool, which was later acquired in a multi-million dollar deal.

In 2017, Cheng co-founded Lumen5, an online video creator, which was ranked one of "Canada's Top Growing Companies" at #93 by The Globe and Mail in 2020, as well as one of "Canada's 50 fastest-growing technology companies" at #34 as ranked by Deloitte in 2021.
