= Michael Roll =

Michael Roll may refer to:

- Michael Roll (actor) (born 1961), German television actor
- Michael Roll (basketball) (born 1987), Tunisian-American professional basketball player
- Michael Roll (pianist) (born 1946), British pianist

== See also ==
- Michel Rolle, French mathematician
