= Mike Tyson (disambiguation) =

Mike Tyson (born 1966) is an American former boxer.

Mike Tyson or Michael Tyson may also refer to:

- Michael Tyson (antiquary) (1740–1780), English clergyman
- Mike Tyson (baseball) (born 1950), American former baseball player
- Mike Tyson (American football) (born 1993), American football player
- Mike Tyson (sprinter), winner of the 1973 4 × 400 meter relay at the NCAA Division I Indoor Track and Field Championships
