= Michael Redman =

Michael Redman may refer to:

- Michael Redman (politician) (born 1966), former New Zealand local government administrator and politician
- Michael Redman (singer) (born 1945), American singer
