= Michael Vincent =

Michael Vincent may refer to:

- Michael Vincent (magician) (born 1964), British magician
- Michael Vincent (music journalist) (born 1976), Canadian music journalist, publisher, and composer
- Jan-Michael Vincent (born 1944), American actor
- Mike Vincent, Australian journalist

== See also ==
- Vincent (surname)
