= Michael Harwood =

Michael Harwood may refer to:

- Michael Harwood (author) (1934–1989), American nature writer
- Michael Harwood (musician) (born 1973), former guitarist for the band Ultra
- Michael Harwood (RAF officer) (born 1958)
- Mike Harwood (born 1959), Australian golfer
