= Michael McElroy =

Michael McElroy is the name of:

- Michael McElroy (actor) (born 1967), American musical theatre actor
- Michael McElroy (scientist) (1939–2026), American atmospheric scientist
