= Michael Kirwan =

Michael Kirwan may refer to:

- Mick Kirwan (1873–1941), Australian member of Queensland Legislative Assembly
- Michael J. Kirwan (1886–1970), American member of U.S. Congress
- Michael Kirwan (artist) (1953–2018), American erotic illustrator and cartoonist
