= Michael Gould =

Michael Gould may refer to:

- Michael Gould (actor) (born 1961), English actor
- Michael Gould (chief executive), American businessman
- Michael C. Gould (born 1953), Superintendent of the United States Air Force Academy
- Mick Gould (born 1930), Irish former Gaelic footballer
- Michael Gould, founder and CTO of Anaplan
