= Michael Sterling (disambiguation) =

Sir Michael Sterling (born 1946) is a British electrical engineer and academic.

Michael Sterling or Stirling may also refer to:

- Michael Sterling (musician) (born 1960), American singer and composer
  - Michael Sterling Music Group, record label owned by Sterling
- Mike Stirling, chief editor of British comic The Beano
