= Death of Michael Meenaghan =

Coordinates: 51.71999°N 1.20523°W

Michael Meenaghan
- Born: Stirling, Scotland
- Died: 10 December 1994; Oxford, England
- Cause of death: Ballistic trauma
- Occupation: Forensic scientist
- Known for: Victim of unsolved murder

Michael Meenaghan was a forensic scientist at Oxford University who was shot dead through his kitchen window on 10 December 1994. He was a lecturer at the Sir William Dunn School of Pathology.

== Background ==
He was originally from Stirling and lived in Monks Close, on the Blackbird Leys estate in Oxford. He had spent the previous four years researching molecular biology of proteins involved in cell adhesion.

He was married but had separated from his wife.

Neighbours said that he had increased security at his house, drawing curtains all day and keeping his doors locked. He had also made his phone number ex-directory in the twelve months before his death.

== Shooting ==
On 10 December 1994 around 4:30 pm a 999 phone call was received. The caller did not speak but could be heard struggling to breathe. When police arrived at the house it looked secure, but they could see a man's body in the kitchen. They broke in and found the body of Meenaghan on the floor with the phone off the hook. His then-girlfriend arrived shortly afterwards, shocked to find the police there.

== Aftermath ==
Police followed several leads, including the possibilities of a hired hitman, or of mistaken identity, but no leads were found. His work was uncontroversial and despite speculation the work had nothing to do with DNA fingerprinting.

On the twentieth anniversary of his murder a reward of £20,000 was offered jointly by Crime Stoppers and Thames Valley Police, which was valid for three months. His mother Pat said, "His death is always with me and there is not a day goes by when I don't miss him. We still don't know why someone would be so callous as to take his life and rob the world of a lovely man and a gifted scientist." Police said there was no clear motive for the shooting.

== See also ==
- List of unsolved murders in the United Kingdom
