= Mike Smithson =

Mike Smithson may refer to:

- Mike Smithson (British journalist) (born 1946), British journalist, Liberal Democrat politician, and political betting expert
- Mike Smithson (Australian journalist), Australian news reporter
- Mike Smithson (baseball) (born 1955), American baseball player
- Mike Smithson (make-up artist), American make-up artist
