= Michael Hearn =

Michael Hearn or Hearne may refer to:

- Michael Patrick Hearn, American literary scholar
- Michael Louis Hearn (1866–1931), Irish politician, member of the Parliament of the United Kingdom
- Michael Hearne (died 1954), Irish politician, members of the Seanad
