= Michael Fernandes =

Michael Fernandes may refer to:

- Michael Fernandes (artist) (born 1944), Canadian artist and educator
- Michael Fernandes (politician) (born 1935), Indian politician

== See also ==
- Michael Fernández (born 1994), Puerto Rican footballer
