= Michael Greenfield =

Michael Greenfield may refer to:

- Michael Greenfield (racing driver) (born 1963), American former owner-driver in the CART series
- Michael Greenfield (rugby league) (born 1985), Australian rugby league player
