= Michael Maher =

Michael Maher may refer to:

- Michael Maher (hurler) (1930–2017), Irish hurler
- Michael Maher (Australian politician) (1936–2013), member of parliament, 1982–1987
- Michael Whalen Maher (1830–1905), architect, builder and politician in New Brunswick
- Mikey Maher (1870–1947), Irish hurler
- Mick Maher, Australian rugby league player
