= Michael Oldfield =

Michael Oldfield may refer to:

- Michael Oldfield (rugby league), Australian rugby league footballer
- Mike Oldfield, English musician
