= Michael Asher =

Michael Asher may refer to:

- Michael Asher (artist) (1943–2012), American conceptual artist
- Michael Asher (explorer) (born 1953), British explorer and author, former SAS

== See also ==
- Mike Asher, fictional character from Marvel Comics
