= Michael Garrison =

Michael Garrison may refer to:

- Michael Garrison (musician) (1956–2004), synthesist
- Michael Garrison (politician), former president of West Virginia University
- Michael Garrison (producer) (1922–1966), creator of the television series The Wild Wild West
- J. Michael Garrison, Episcopal bishop
