= Michael Sellers =

Michael Sellers may refer to:

- Mike Sellers (born 1975), American football fullback
- Michael Sellers (actor) (1954–2006), British actor, author and the son of actor Peter Sellers
- Michael Sellers (cricketer) (born 1952), Australian cricketer
- Michael Sellers, murderer in the killing of Gracie Spinks
