= Michael Hough =

Michael Hough may refer to:

- Michael Hough (bishop), Anglican Bishop of Ballarat in Australia
- Michael Hough (politician) (born 1979), American politician in the Maryland Senate
- Mike Hough (Michael Lloyd Hough, born 1963), Canadian professional ice hockey player
- Jack Hough (Michael William Hough, 1916–1971), Australian politician
