= Michael Milton =

Michael Milton may refer to:

- Michael A. Milton (born 1958), American theologian
- Michael Milton (cricketer) (born 1943), English cricketer
- Michael Milton (skier) (born 1973), Australian Paralympic skier and cyclist
