= Michael Mulcahy =

Michael Mulcahy may refer to:

- Michael Mulcahy (politician) (born 1960), former Irish Fianna Fáil politician
- Michael Mulcahy (painter) (born 1952), Irish expressionist painter
