= Michael Costigan =

Michael Costigan may refer to:

- Michael Costigan (film producer), American producer
- Michael Costigan (writer) (born 1931), Australian writer
- Michael Costigan, character in The Reaping
