= Michael David =

Michael David may refer to:

- Michael David (painter) (born 1954), American painter
- Michael David (producer), Broadway producer
- Michael David (judge), judge in the Supreme Court of South Australia 2006–2014
- one member of the duo Classixx
