= Michael Quinlan =

Michael Quinlan may refer to:

- Sir Michael Quinlan (civil servant) (1930–2009), British defence strategist and official in the British Ministry of Defence
- Michael Quinlan (musician), musician with The Mexican Spitfires
- Michael R. Quinlan (1944–2025), former McDonald's CEO
- Michael Quinlan, staff member of the Louisville Courier-Journal and author of the book Little Lost Angel, about the murder of Shanda Sharer
