= Michael McNulty (disambiguation) =

Michael McNulty is a politician.

Michael McNulty may also refer to:

- Mike McNulty (boxing manager) (1887–1965)
- Matthew McNulty, né Michael McNulty, actor
- Michael Barnes McNulty, character in The Wire
- Michael McNulty, writer of Waco: The Rules of Engagement
- Michael McNulty (tennis), President of the United States Tennis Association
