= Michael Nichols =

Michael or Mike Nichols may refer to:

- Mike Nichols (1931–2014), American film, stage, and television director and producer
- Michael Nichols (photographer) (born 1952), American journalist and photographer
- Mike J. Nichols, American film editor
- Mike Nichols (author) (born 1952), American neo-Pagan leader and author
