= Michael Lockshin =

Michael Lockshin may refer to:

- Michael D. Lockshin, American professor and medical researcher
- Michael Lockshin (film director), film director and writer
