= Michael McFadden =

Michael McFadden may refer to:

- Michael Óg McFadden, Irish Fine Gael politician
- Michael McFadden (sailor), Rhodesian sailor
- Mike McFadden, American businessman
