= Michael Copeland =

Michael Copeland may refer to:

- Michael Copeland (politician) (born 1954), Unionist MLA from Northern Ireland
- Michael Copeland (sports executive) in Ontario, Canada
