= Michael Lomax (disambiguation) =

Michael Lomax may refer to:

- Michael Lomax (born 1947), president and CEO of the United Negro College Fund
- Michael Lomax (boxer) (born 1978), English boxer
- Mike Lomax (born 1979), English footballer
