= Michael Hutchings =

Michael Hutchings may refer to:

- Michael Hutchings (mathematician)
- Michael Hutchings (chef)
