= Michael Darling =

Michael Darling may refer to:

- Michael Darling (Peter Pan), youngest of the three children in the Darling family
- Michael Darling (curator) (born 1968), curator at the Museum of Contemporary Art, Chicago
- Michael Darling (field hockey) (born 1988), Ireland field hockey international
