= Michael Huang =

Michael Huang may refer to:

- Michael Huang (actor) (born 1958), Taiwanese actor and singer
- Michael Xufu Huang (born 1994), Chinese art collector and socialite
- Michael Huang (animator) (born 1997), American animator and YouTuber
