= Mike Flood =

Mike Flood may refer to:

- Mike Flood (politician) (born 1975), member of U.S. House of Representatives from Nebraska
- Mike Flood (Fireman Sam), a character in Fireman Sam
- Michael Flood, sociologist

== See also ==
- MIKE FLOOD, a hydrodynamic computer modelling program from DHI
