= Michael Johns =

Michael Johns may refer to:

- Michael Johns (baseball) (born 1975), American baseball coach
- Michael Johns (policy analyst) (born 1964), American business executive, federal government official, and writer
- Michael Johns (singer) (1978–2014), Australian singer/songwriter
- Michael M. E. Johns, American physician
