= Michael Reeves =

Michael Reeves may refer to:

- Michael Reeves (director) (1943–1969), English film director
- Michael Reeves (footballer) (born 1959), Australian footballer
- Michael Reeves (YouTuber) (born 1997), Filipino-American YouTuber

== See also ==
- Michael Reaves (1950–2023), American television writer
- Michael Reeve (born 1943), British classicist
