= Mike Bartlett =

Mike or Michael Bartlett may refer to:

- Mike Bartlett (playwright) (born 1980), English playwright and theatre director
- Mike Bartlett (ice hockey) (born 1985), American ice hockey player
- Michael Bartlett (rugby union) (born 1978), New Zealand rugby union player
- Michael Bartlett (director), American filmmaker, producer, screenwriter, and editor
