= Michael Hartmann =

Michael Hartmann may refer to:

- Michael Hartmann (footballer) (born 1974), German footballer who played for the national team in 2003
- Michael Hartmann (politician) (born 1963), German politician, member of the Bundestag
- Michael Hartmann (judge) (born 1944), Hong Kong judge from Zimbabwe
- Michael Hartmann (soccer), American association football player
- Mike Hartman, American ice hockey player
