= Michael Schulte =

Michael Schulte may refer to:

- Michael Schulte (professor) (born 1963), German professor of Nordic linguistics in Norway
- Michael Schulte (singer) (born 1990), German singer and songwriter
