= Michael Meredith =

Michael Meredith may refer to:

- Michael Meredith (film director) (born 1967), American film director, screenwriter and producer
- Michael Meredith (architect) (born 1971), American architect
- Michael Meredith (politician) (born 1985), American politician and member of the Kentucky House of Representatives
