= Michael McCord =

Michael McCord could refer to:

- Austin Idol, also known as "Iron" Mike McCord, (born 1949), American professional wrestler
- Michael J. McCord (born 1959), American government official
