= Michael Carrington =

Michael Carrington may refer to:

- Michael Carrington (figure skater), British figure skater
- Michael Carrington (voice actor), American television comedy writer and voice actor
- Michael Carrington (television executive) (born 1961), Australian broadcast media executive
- Michael Carrington, a fictional character in the 1982 film Grease 2, portrayed by Maxwell Caulfield
- Michael A. Carrington (born 1959), Barbados politician
