= Michael Pollard =

Michael Pollard may be:

- Michael J. Pollard (1939–2019), American actor
- Michael Pollard (cricketer) (born 1989), New Zealand cricketer
