= Michael Mayo (disambiguation) =

Michael Mayo (born 1992) is an American singer and composer.

Michael Mayo or Mike Mayo may also refer to:

- Michael Mayo (poet), American poet
- Mike Mayo, a sheriff impeached in 1976 in Vermont, United States
