= Michael O'Dea =

Michael O'Dea may refer to:

- Michael O'Dea (Irish politician) (died 1932), Irish Cumann na nGaedheal politician
- Michael O'Dea (Australian politician) (born 1938), Australian solicitor and former local government politician

== See also ==
- Mick O'Dea, Irish artist
