= Michael Llewellyn =

Michael Llewellyn may refer to:

- Mike Llewellyn, cricketer
- Sir Michael Llewellyn, 2nd Baronet (1921–1994) of the Llewellyn baronets
- Michael Llewellyn (rugby), in 2008–09 Rugby-Bundesliga squads

== See also ==
- Michael Llewellyn-Smith, British diplomat and academic
- Michael Llewellyn-Smith (architect), Australian architect and city planner
