= Michael Holt =

Michael Holt may refer to:

- Michael W. Holt (died 1858), American politician from North Carolina
- Michael Holt (author) (1929–2003), British puzzle-book author
- Michael Holt (musician) (born 1968), American musician
- Michael Holt (English footballer) (born 1977)
- Michael Holt (snooker player) (born 1978), English snooker player
- Michael Holt (German footballer) (born 1986)
- Mister Terrific (Michael Holt), DC Comics superhero
