= Michael Falzon =

Michael Falzon may refer to:

- Michael Falzon (actor) (1972–2020), Australian actor
- Michael Falzon (politician, born 1945) (1945–2025), Maltese architect and politician, MP (1976–1996)
- Michael Falzon (politician, born 1961), member of the Maltese parliament
