= Michael McCafferty (disambiguation) =

Michael McCafferty may refer to:

- Michael McCafferty (software entrepreneur) (born 1942), entrepreneur
- Michael McCafferty, American actor in The Invisible Man (2000 TV series) Not a Father's Day
- Michael McCafferty, British poet in Children of Albion: Poetry of the Underground in Britain
- Michael McCafferty, Northern Ireland musician of Swanee River (band)

== See also ==
Distinguish from

- Michael Cafferty, British ambassador to Dominican Republic, see List of Ambassadors of the United Kingdom to the Dominican Republic
