= Michael Forbes =

Michael Forbes may refer to:

- Michael Forbes (politician) (born 1952), American politician from the state of New York
- Michael Forbes (farmer) (born 1952), Scottish farmer
- Mike Forbes (born 1957), ice hockey player
- Michael Forbes (footballer) (born 2004), Northern Irish footballer
- Mickey Forbes, character in The Affairs of Jimmy Valentine
