= Michael Beck (disambiguation) =

Michael Beck may refer to:

- Michael Beck (born 1949), American actor
- Michi Beck (Michael Beck, born 1967), German singer
- Mikkel Beck (born 1973), Danish football player
