= Michael Adler (disambiguation) =

Michael Adler (1868–1944) was an English Orthodox rabbi and military chaplain.

Michael Adler may also refer to:

- Michael J. Adler, American diplomat and U.S. ambassador to South Sudan
- Michael M. Adler, American businessman and U.S. ambassador to Belgium
- Michael Adler (physician), British medical researcher (born 1939)
