= Michael Peacock =

Michael Peacock is the name of:

- Michael Peacock (television executive) (1929–2019), British television executive
- Michael Peacock (born 1958), British gay escort and purveyor of extreme pornography, see R v Peacock
- Mike Peacock (born 1940), English football goalkeeper active in the 1960s
