= Michael Wilkins =

Michael Wilkins may refer to:

- Michael Wilkins (Royal Marines officer) (1933–1994), British general
- Michael J. Wilkins (born 1948), American lawyer and member of the Utah Supreme Court
- Mike Wilkins (born 1942), English footballer
