= Michael McConnell =

Mike or Michael McConnell is the name of:

- Michael W. McConnell (born 1955), American constitutional law scholar and former appellate judge
- Michael McConnell (activist) (born 1942), American LGBT activist
- Mike McConnell (U.S. Naval officer) (born 1943), American naval officer and Director of National Intelligence of the United States
- Mike McConnell (radio personality), Cincinnati, Ohio-based radio talk show host
- Mike McConnell (racing driver), American stock car racing driver
