= Michael Yates =

Michael Yates may refer to:

- Michael Yates (television designer) (1919–2001), English television, opera, and stage designer
- Michael Yates (economist) (born 1946), American economist and labor educator
- J. Michael Yates (born 1938), Canadian poet, dramatist and fiction writer
- Mike Yates, fictional character in Doctor Who

== See also ==
- Michael Yeats (1921–2007), Irish politician
