= Michael Chaplin =

Michael Chaplin may refer to:

- Michael Chaplin (actor) (born 1946), English-American actor
- Michael Chaplin (writer) (born 1951), English television writer and executive
- Mike Chaplin (born 1943), British artist
