= Michael Nugent (disambiguation) =

Michael Nugent is an Irish writer and activist.

Michael or Mike Nugent may also refer to:

- Michael Nugent (Australian footballer), Australian rules footballer
- Mike Nugent, American football placekicker
- Mike Nugent (soccer), American soccer player
- Mike Nugent (athlete), Australian Paralympian
