= Mike Perez =

Mike Perez may refer to:

- Mike Perez (American football) (born 1963), American football quarterback
- Mike Pérez (baseball) (born 1964), Puerto Rican baseball pitcher
- Mike Perez (boxer) (born 1985), Irish-based Cuban boxer

== See also ==
- Michael Pérez (born 1992), Puerto Rican baseball catcher
- Michael Pérez (footballer) (born 1993), Mexican football (soccer) midfielder
