= Michael Bowen =

Michael Bowen may refer to:

- Michael Bowen (actor) (born 1958), American film and television actor
- Michael Bowen (artist) (1937–2009), American artist
- Michael Bowen (bishop) (1930–2019), British Roman Catholic archbishop
