= Mike Masters =

Mike or Michael Masters may refer to:

- Mike Masters (soccer), American soccer player
- Mike Masters (wrestler), American professional wrestler
- Michael G. Masters, American executive in homeland security and emergency management
- Michael P. Masters, American professor of biological anthropology, see Time-traveler UFO hypothesis
