= Michael Wiander =

Swedish children's book author

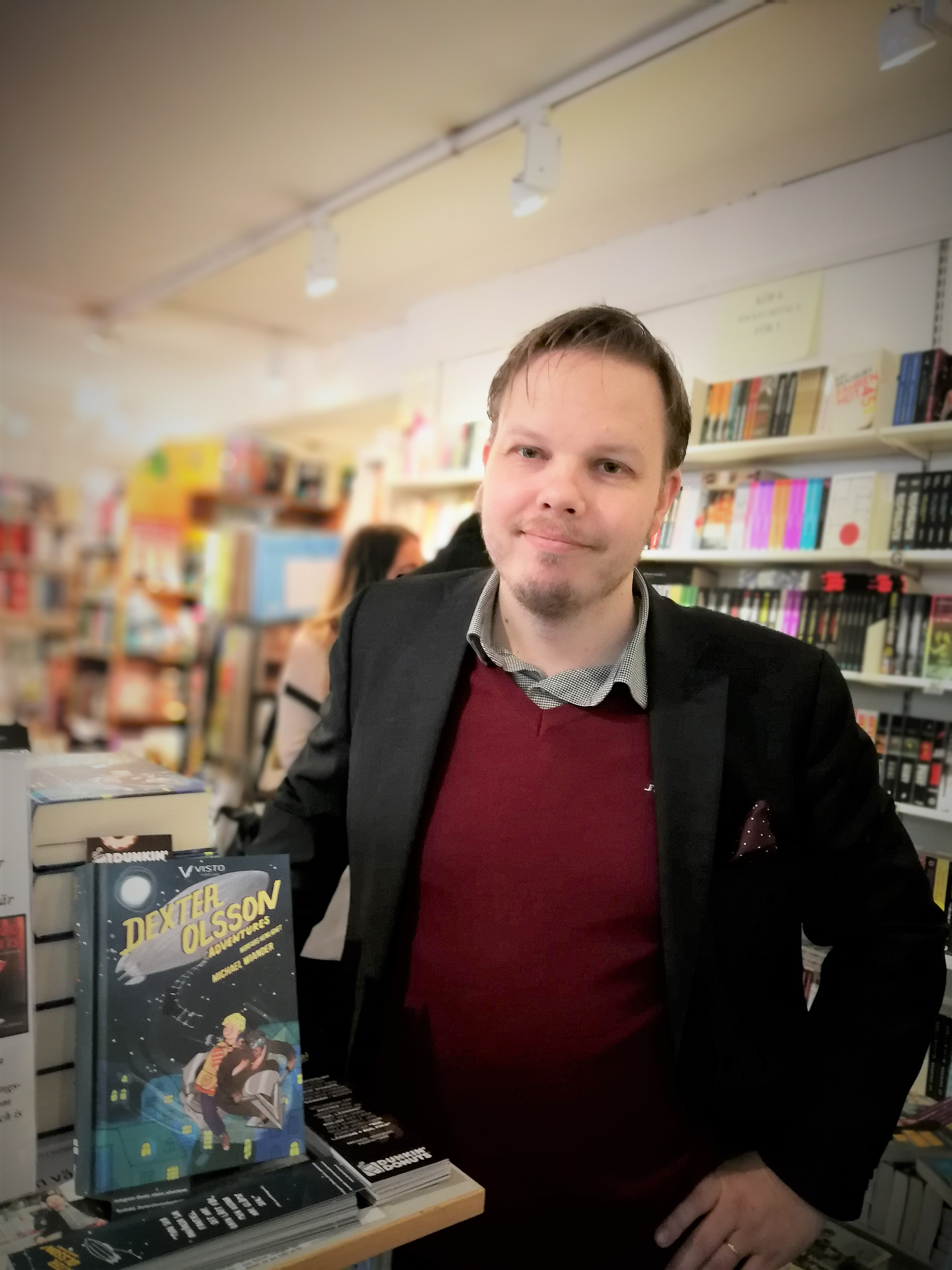
Michael Wiander in 2018

Michael Johan Sebastian Wiander (born 4 March 1974 in Ekenäs) is a Swedish children's book author. Wiander debuted in 2017 when releasing the book Morfars hemlighet.

Wiander is also a chess player and in 1989 he won the Swedish championship in the game.

== Bibliography ==
- 2017 – Morfars hemlighet (Visto), ISBN 9789188639660
- 2018 – Flykten till vulkanön (Visto), ISBN 9789188639561
- 2019 – Fångar i Luxor (Stevali), ISBN 9789188639509
- 2019 – Marias kockskola (Grenadine; illustrerad av Peter Jönsson), ISBN 9789188639691
- 2021 – Lång Rockad (Idus förlag), ISBN 9789176341988
- 2022 – Jättebjörnen Leonard (Idus förlag), ISBN 9789176343920
- 2022 – Dexter Olsson : En hemlig värld (Idus förlag), ISBN 9789176345559
- 2023 – Dexter Olsson : Flykten från Björnön (Idus förlag), ISBN 9789176349397
- 2023 – Dexter Olsson : I faraos skugga (Idus förlag), ISBN 9789180920209
