= Michael Charlton-Weedy =

British Army general

Major General Michael Charlton-Weedy CBE DL (born June 1950) is a retired Army officer and senior civil servant.

He was commissioned into the Royal Artillery from RMA Sandhurst in 1971. As a Lieutenant-Colonel Charlton-Weedy was Commanding Officer of 4th Field Regiment, Royal Artillery 1990–1992. As a Brigadier he conducted the Ministry of Defence's Senior Officers’ Personnel Study, and was Director Operational Requirements for Land Command & Information Systems 1997–2000. His last military appointment was as Deputy Adjutant General 2001–2003. He was appointed OBE in 1993 and CBE in 1997.

He left the Army in 2003 to become Chief Executive of the Emergency Planning College. In 2010 on completing the privatisation of EPC in 2010 he was appointed Director UK Resilience Training in the Cabinet Office, from which he stepped down on semi-retirement in 2017. He retired fully from the Civil Service in May 2019.

He is a Deputy Lieutenant of North Yorkshire. and County President of the Royal British Legion for North and East Yorkshire.
