= Michael Deacon =

Michael Deacon may refer to:

- Michael the Deacon, 16th century Oriental Orthodox deacon
- Michael Deacon (actor) (1933–2000), Scottish actor
- Michael Deacon (journalist) (born 1980), British journalist
- Michael Deacon (bishop) (died 1500), bishop of St Asaph
