= Michael Wall =

Michael Wall may refer to:

- Michael Wall (playwright) (1946–1991), British playwright
- Michael Wall (ice hockey) (born 1985), former ice hockey goaltender
- Michael Wall (swimmer) (born 1946), American swimmer
