= Michael Pittman =

Michael Pittman may refer to:

- Michael Pittman Sr. (born 1975), American football running back
- Michael Pittman Jr. (born 1997), American football wide receiver
