= Michael Conlan =

Michael Conlan may refer to:

- Michael Conlan (boxer) (born 1991), Irish boxer
- Michael Conlan (footballer) (born 1958), former Australian rules footballer
