= Michael Arnold =

British novelist

- Born: 1979 (age 46–47); Petersfield, Hampshire, England
- Occupation: Novelist

Michael Arnold (born October 1979) is a British novelist who writes historical fiction.

== Early life and education ==
Michael Arnold was brought up and educated in the market town of Petersfield, in Hampshire, where he still lives with his wife and four children.

== Career ==
Arnold worked in the financial services industry for 10 years before writing full-time. He started creating his series of civil war novels in 2009. The first book, Traitor's Blood, was published in 2010 to positive reviews. Since then Arnold has released seven more novels in this series, and started a new series called 'Highwayman'.

== Books ==
=== The Civil War Chronicles ===
- Traitor's Blood (John Murray, 2010)
- Devil's Charge (John Murray, 2011)
- Hunter's Rage (John Murray, 2012)
- Assassin's Reign (Hodder & Stoughton, 2013)
- Stryker & the Angels of Death (Hodder & Stoughton, 2013)
- Warlord's Gold (Hodder & Stoughton, 2014)
- Marston Moor (Hodder & Stoughton, July 2015)
- Prince's Gambit (Hodder & Stoughton, May 2015)

=== Highwayman ===
- Highwayman Ironside (Endeavour Press, 2013)
- Winter Swarm (Endeavour Press, 2015)
- War's End (Sharpe Books, 2020)

=== The Savage Isle ===
- The Savage Isle (Canelo, 2025)
- The River Warriors (Canelo, 2026)
- The Hemlock Throne (Canelo, 2027)
