= Michael Morrissey =

Michael Morrissey may refer to:

- Michael Morrissey (politician) (died 1947), Irish Fianna Fáil politician
- Michael W. Morrissey (born 1954), District Attorney of Norfolk County, Massachusetts
- Michael Morrissey (writer) (born 1942), New Zealand poet and author
- Michael T. Morrissey, United States Army general
