= Michael Kahn =

Michael Kahn may refer to:

- Michael Kahn (businessman), American businessman, founder and CEO of Kahn Ventures, Inc.
- Michael Kahn (film editor) (born 1930), American film editor
- Michael Kahn (lawyer) (born 1949), American lawyer
- Michael Kahn (theatre director) (born 1937), American theatre director and drama educator, artistic director of the Shakespeare Theatre Company, Washington, D.C.
- Mike Kahn (1954–2008), American sports journalist
