= Michael Rich =

Michael Rich may refer to:

- Michael Rich (cyclist) (born 1969), German road bicycle racer
- Michael D. Rich, president and CEO of the RAND Corporation
- R. Michael Rich (born 1957), American astrophysicist
- Mike Rich (born 1959), American screenwriter
