= Michael Ash =

Michael Ash may refer to:

- Michael Woolston Ash (1789–1858), member of the U.S. House of Representatives from Pennsylvania
- Michael Edward Ash (1927–2016), British mathematician and brewer
- Mick Ash (1943–2012), English footballer
