= Michael Devlin =

Michael Devlin may refer to:

- Michael Devlin (bass-baritone) (born 1942), opera singer
- Michael J. Devlin (born 1965), convicted kidnapper and child molester
- Mike Devlin (entrepreneur), co-founder of Rational Software
- Mike Devlin (American football) (born 1969), ex-Buffalo Bills guard
- Mikey Devlin (born 1993), Scottish professional footballer
