= Mike Washington =

Mike Washington or Michael Washington may refer to:

- Mike Washington (cornerback) (1953–2021), American football cornerback, formerly in the NFL
- Mike Washington (wide receiver) (born 1986), American football wide receiver, in college football and arena football
- Mike Washington Jr. (born 2003), American football running back, currently in the NFL
- Michael Benjamin Washington, American actor
