= Michael Curley =

Michael Curley may refer to:

- Michael Joseph Curley (1879–1947), American Roman Catholic archbishop
- Michael Curley (footballer) (1912–1973), English footballer

== See also ==
- Mick Curley, Gaelic football referee
- James Michael Curley (1874–1958), American politician
