= Michael Forsyth =

Michael Forsyth may refer to:

- Michael Forsyth, Baron Forsyth of Drumlean (born 1954), British Conservative politician
- Michael Forsyth (footballer) (born 1966), English former footballer

== See also ==
- Michael Forsythe, American journalist
