= Mike Little (disambiguation) =

Mike Little is an English web developer.

Mike or Michael Little may also refer to:

- Mike Little (ice hockey) (born 1987), American ice hockey defenseman
- Michael Little, New Zealand rugby union player
