= Michael Middleton (disambiguation) =

Michael Middleton (born 1949) is a British businessman and father of Catherine, Princess of Wales.

Michael or Mike Middleton may also refer to:

- Michael Middleton (priest) (born 1940), English Anglican priest, Archdeacon of Swindon, 1992–1997
- Michael Middleton (academic), American academic lawyer and former interim president of the University of Missouri
- Mike Middleton (American football) (born 1969), American football player

== See also ==
- Michael Middleton Dwyer (born 1954), American architect
