= Michael McGowan =

Michael McGowan may refer to:

- Michael McGowan (footballer) (born 1985), association football player
- Michael McGowan (politician) (born 1940), British Labour Member of the European Parliament, 1984–1999
- Michael McGowan (director) (born 1966), film director and screenwriter
- Mick McGowan (born 1973), darts player
- Mike McGowan, Scottish footballer
