= Mike Baird (disambiguation) =

Mike Baird (born 1968) is an Australian investment banker who was the premier of New South Wales.

Mike or Michael Baird may also refer to:

- Mike Baird (musician) (born 1951), American drummer
- "Mike Baird" (song), by Tom Budin, 2016
- Michael Baird (soccer) (born 1983), Australian soccer striker
