= Mike Hollingsworth =

Mike Hollingsworth may refer to:

- Mike Hollingsworth (animator), American artist, animator and stand-up comedian
- Michael Hollingsworth (cyclist) (born 1943), Australian Olympic cyclist
- Michael Hollingsworth (writer) (born 1950), Canadian playwright, theatre director and artist
- Michael Hollingsworth, American housing activist and 2021 New York City Council candidate for the 35th district
