= Michael Pollack =

Michael Pollack may refer to:

- Michael Pollack (songwriter), born 1994
- Michael Pollack, the birth name of Michael J. Pollard, actor, 1939–2019
