= Michael Lamb =

Michael Lamb may refer to:

- Michael Lamb (politician), controller of the city of Pittsburgh
- Michael Lamb (psychologist), professor of psychology at Cambridge University
- Mike Lamb (Michael Robert Lamb, born 1975), American baseball player
- Wayne Lamb (Michael Lamb, 1920–2001), Broadway dancer, choreographer, theatre director and dance professor
- Michael Lamb, a character in the 1988 film Lamb

== See also ==
- Michael Lam, actor
