= Michael Bradshaw =

Michael Bradshaw may refer to:

- Michael Bradshaw (1933–2001), English actor
- Michael J. Bradshaw, British geographer
