= Michael Chadwick =

Michael Chadwick may refer to:

- Michael Chadwick (cricketer), English cricketer
- Michael Chadwick (swimmer), American swimmer
- Michael Chadwick (Hollyoaks)
