= Mike Ramos =

Mike Ramos may refer to:

- Mike Ramos (decathlete)
- Mike Ramos (footballer)
- Michael A. Ramos, American attorney

== See also ==
- Myke Ramos, Brazilian footballer
