= Michael Hare =

Michael Hare may refer to:

- Michael Hare (architect)
- Michael Hare, 2nd Viscount Blakenham
