= Mike McGlinchey =

Mike or Michael McGlinchey may refer to:

- Michael McGlinchey (born 1987), New Zealand footballer
- Michael McGlinchey (actor), in 1979 Australian TV miniseries Top Mates
- Mike McGlinchey (American football coach) (1944–1997), American college football coach
- Mike McGlinchey (offensive lineman) (born 1995), American football offensive tackle
- Mike McGlinchey Jr. (born 1976), American college football coach
