= Michael Kent =

Michael Kent may refer to:

- Michael Kent (businessman), Australian businessman
- Michael Kent (computer specialist), co-founded the Computer Group which used a statistics-based system to predict college football results
- Michael Kent (comedian), American comedian and magician
- Michael Kent (footballer), English footballer
- Prince Michael of Kent, member of the British royal family
