= Michael Richey (disambiguation) =

Michael Richey (1917–2009) was an English sailor and navigator.

Michael Richey may also refer to:

- Michael Richey (scholar) (1678–1761), German scholar and poet, set the verses to Telemanns Admiralitätsmusik
- David Michael Richey (1938–2015), real name of the American jazz musician Slim Richey
