= Michael Kramer =

Michael Kramer may refer to:

- Michael Krämer (born 1985), German football player
- Michael Eric Kramer (born 1962), American actor
- Michael Kramer (narrator), American audiobook narrator
- Mike Kramer (born 1955), American football coach
- Michael Kramer (astronomer) (born 1967), German radio astronomer and astrophysicist
- Michael Kramer (Minnesota politician) (1886-1955), American farmer, railway employee, and politician
