= Michael Gorman =

Michael or Mike Gorman may refer to:

- Michael Gorman (musician) (1895–1970), Irish traditional fiddler
- Michael Gorman (librarian) (born 1941), British-born librarian
- Michael Gorman (Wisconsin politician) (1816–1899), American politician
- Michael A. Gorman (1950–2012), American politician
- Mike Gorman (born 1945), American basketball player and sports commentator
- Michael J. Gorman (born 1955), New Testament scholar
