= Michael Schofield =

Michael Schofield may refer to:

- Michael Schofield (American football) (born 1990), American football player
- Michael Schofield (lacrosse), lacrosse player
- Michael Schofield (water polo), head coach for the water polo team of the United States Naval Academy
- Michael Schofield (campaigner) (1919–2014), British pioneer of social research into homosexuality
- Mike Schofield (born 1964), American lawyer and politician

== See also ==
- Michael Scofield, a character on the American television series Prison Break
