= Michael Clarkson =

Michael Clarkson may refer to

- Michael Clarkson (journalist) (born 1948 or 1949), Canadian journalist
- Michael Clarkson (pastoralist) (1804–1871), early settler in the Australian Swan River Colony
- Michael Clarkson (rugby league) English rugby league player active in the 1990s and 2000s
