= Michael Houser (disambiguation) =

Michael Houser was an American guitarist and the founder of the band Widespread Panic.

Michael House may also refer to as:

- Michael Houser (ice hockey), American ice hockey player
- Michael Houser (politician), American politician

== See also ==
- Houser
- House (surname)
