= Michael Waugh =

Michael Waugh may refer to:

- Mike Waugh (1955–2014), Republican State Senator for Pennsylvania's 28th district
- Michael Waugh (artist), Brooklyn-based artist
- Michael Waugh (singer), Australian country singer
