= Michael Shalhoub =

Michael Shalhoub may refer to:

- Michael Shalhoub (born 1942), American actor, brother of actor Tony Shalhoub
- Omar Sharif (born Michel Yusef Dimitri Chalhoub; 1932–2015), Egyptian actor

== See also ==
- Michel Chalhoub
