= Michael York (disambiguation) =

Michael York (born 1942) is an English actor.

Michael York may also refer to:

- Michael York (religious studies scholar), American religious studies scholar
- Michael York (field hockey) (born 1967), Australian former field hockey defender
- Michael M. York (born 1953), American journalist and attorney
- Mike York (born 1978), ice hockey player
- Mike York (baseball) (born 1964), former MLB pitcher

== See also ==
- Michael Yorke (1939–2019), Anglican priest
