= Michael Matheson =

Michael Matheson may refer to:

- Michael Matheson (politician) (born 1970), Scottish politician
- Michael Matheson, fictional character in the 2009 film Grace
- Mike Matheson (born 1994), Canadian ice hockey player
