= Mike Quigley (disambiguation) =

Mike Quigley (born 1958) is a U.S. representative for Illinois.

Mike or Michael Quigley may also refer to:

- Mike Quigley (businessman) (born 1953), Australian telecommunication business executive
- Mike Quigley (footballer) (born 1970), English footballer
- Michael J. Quigley, American expert in interrogation and counter-terrorism
