= Michael Tsur =

Israeli attorney and academic

- מיכאל צור
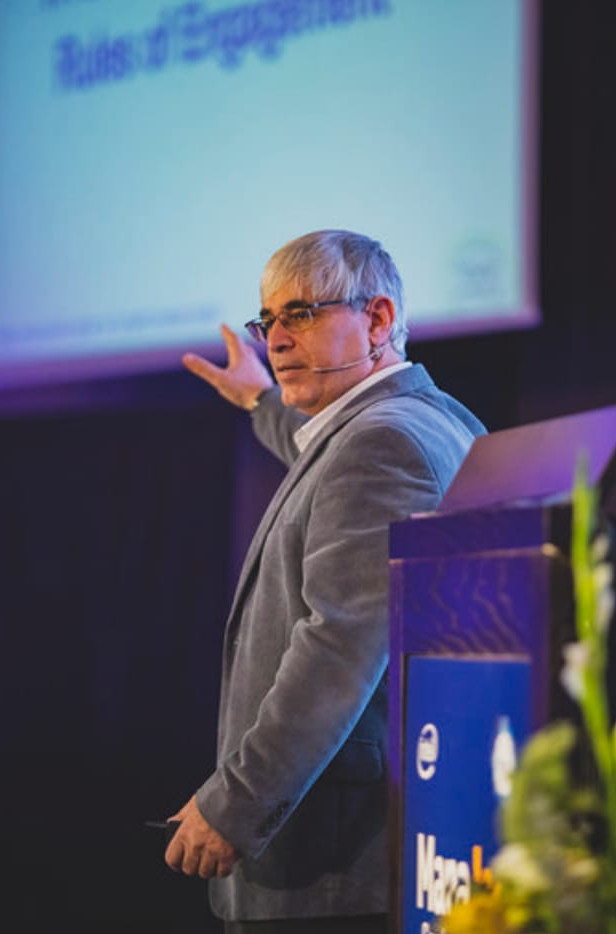
- Born: Jerusalem, Israel
- Occupations: Negotiation expert, academic, coach

Michael Tsur (Hebrew: מיכאל צור) is an Israeli attorney, negotiator, mediator, and academic. He teaches mediation and negotiation in several institutions worldwide and was involved as a negotiator in a number of events, such as Kidnapping of Alan Johnston, Siege of the Church of the Nativity in Bethlehem and Israeli disengagement from Gaza.

== Professional life ==
In 1999, he cofounded The Israeli Chamber of Mediators and was its chairman from 1999 to 2003. Also since 1999, he is a member of the Israel Defense Forces Hostage Negotiation Team. He served as a mediator of the Supreme Court of Israel, and has developed his own dispute resolution method used by entrepreneurs and managers of multinational companies.

In 2003, Tsur edited the Hebrew edition of The New York Times Best Seller Difficult Conversations: How to Discuss What Matters Most. In December 2012 several mediation organizations from France, Italy and Switzerland created European Union of Mediators and named Michael Tsur its honourable president.

== Academic work ==
Tsur teaches negotiation and conflict resolution courses at Hebrew University of Jerusalem, Cardozo School of Law in New York City, Mitchell Hamline School of Law in Saint Paul, Minnesota, U.S., and Università Cattolica del Sacro Cuore in Milan, Italy. Tsur maintains relationships with the Program on Negotiation of Harvard University. He also specializes in coaching executives around the world on how to navigate complex negotiations and situations.

In 2012, Tsur founded a negotiation school Shakla & Tariya in Herzliya, Israel.

== Personal life ==
Tsur lives in Mevaseret Zion, a suburb of Jerusalem, with his wife and their four daughters.
