= Michael McGoldrick (disambiguation) =

Michael McGoldrick (born 1971) is an Irish flute and tin whistle player.

Michael McGoldrick may also refer to:

- Michael McGoldrick (murder victim) (1965–1996), Northern Irish murder victim
- Michael McGoldrick (Gaelic footballer) (born 1984), Gaelic footballer
