= Michael McGlynn (disambiguation) =

Michael McGlynn may refer to:

- Michael McGlynn (born 1964), Irish composer, director, and producer
- Michael J. McGlynn (born 1953), former mayor of Medford, Massachusetts
- Michael McGlynn (swimmer) (born 2000), South African marathon swimmer
