= Michael Ray =

Michael Ray may refer to:

- Michael Ray (guitarist) (born 1960), American guitarist and former member of Plasmatics
- Michael Ray (politician), American politician and Maine state legislator
- Michael Ray (singer) (born 1988), American country music singer active beginning in 2010
  - Michael Ray (album), his self-titled debut album
- Michael Ray (trumpeter) (born 1952), American jazz trumpeter
