= Michael Holman =

Michael Holman may refer to:

- Michael Holman (filmmaker), artist, writer, musician and filmmaker
- Michael Holman (linguist), British linguist and Slavicist
- Michael Holman (priest), Jesuit priest
- Michael Holman (journalist) (born 1945), journalist and author, specialist in Africa
