= Michael Diamond =

Michael Diamond or Mike Diamond may refer to:

- Michael Diamond (sport shooter) (born 1972), Australian Olympic sport shooter
- Mike Diamond (tattoo artist), cast member on the Australian TV series Bondi Ink Tattoo
- Mike D (born 1965), American musician and member of the hip-hop group Beastie Boys
- BloodPop (previously known as Michael Diamond), music producer, songwriter, musician

== See also ==
- Michael "Diamond" Gargano, founding member and bass player for rock group Legs Diamond
