= Michael Tierney =

Michael Tierney may refer to:

- Michael Tierney (bishop) (1839–1908), Roman Catholic bishop
- Michael Tierney (politician) (1894–1975), Irish politician, president of University College Dublin
- Michael Tierney (musician) (born 1977), member of Australian band Human Nature
- Michael Tierney (Gaelic footballer) (born 1986), Gaelic football player from Laois in Ireland
- Mick Pyro, Irish musician
