= Michael Gaughan =

Michael Gaughan may refer to:

- Michael Gaughan (businessman) (born 1943), American businessman, race car driver, race car owner and casino operator
- Michael Gaughan (Irish republican) (1949–1974), Irish republican who died on hunger strike in England
