= Michael Kaplan =

Michael Kaplan may refer to:

- Michael Kaplan (biologist) (born 1952), American biology researcher, medical professor and clinical physician
- Michael Kaplan (costume designer), American movie costume designer
- Myq Kaplan (born 1978), American stand-up comedian
