= Michael Howe =

Michael Howe may refer to:

- Michael Howe (bushranger) (1787–1818), Tasmanian bushranger
- Michael Howe (politician), member of the North Dakota House of Representatives
- Michael J. A. Howe (1940–2002), British cognitive psychologist
- Mike Howe, musician
- Mike Howe (rugby union), New Zealand rugby union player
