= Michael Rucker =

Michael Rucker may refer to:

- Mike Rucker (born 1975), American football defensive end
- Michael Rucker (baseball) (born 1994), American baseball pitcher
