= Michael Frey =

Michael Frey may refer to:

- Michael Frey (politician), American politician from Virginia
- Michael Frey (footballer) (born 1994), Swiss footballer
- Michael Frey (composer) (1787–1832), German composer-conductor

== See also ==
- Michael Fray (1947–2019), Jamaican sprinter
