= Michael Fennelly =

Michael Fennelly may refer to:

- Michael Fennelly (musician) (born 1949), American singer and songwriter in the 1960s and 1970s
- Michael Fennelly (hurler) (born 1985), Irish hurler
