= Michael Essex =

English rugby union player

- Born: Michael Essex; 9 July 1985 (age 41) Ruislip, London
- University: University College Cork

Rugby union career
- Position: Hooker
- Current team: North Otago
Senior career
Years	Team	Apps	(Points)
- University College Cork
–	Highfield		
–	Shannon		
–	North Otago 2009-		

Michael Essex (born 9 July 1985 in Ruislip, London) is a professional Rugby union player. He plays as a hooker for North Otago Rugby Football Union. He was formally player for Munster Rugby. He has played for Ireland as a schoolboy, U19 and U21 international, his father Andy Essex is a former Wasps, Metropolitan Police and Middlesex player.
