= Mike Miles =

Mike Miles may refer to:

- Mike Miles (school superintendent), school superintendent in Texas
- Mike Miles Jr., American college basketball player

== See also ==
- Michael Miles, New Zealand-born television presenter in Great Britain
- Michael A. Miles, American marketer and businessman
