= Michael Shannon (disambiguation) =

Michael Shannon (born 1974) is an American actor and musician.

Michael Shannon may also refer to:

- Michael J. Shannon (1943–2023), American actor
- Michael Shannon (pediatrician) (c. 1953–2009), American pediatric toxicologist
- Mike Shannon (1939–2023), American baseball player and sportscaster
- The Strangers with Mike Shannon, 1960s South African pop group
- MJ Shannon, member of the Connecticut House of Representatives
