= Michael Fish (disambiguation) =

Michael Fish is a television weatherman in the UK.

Michael Fish may also refer to:

- Michael Fish (fashion designer), fashion designer prominent in the UK in the 1960s and 1970s
- Michael Fish (architect) (born 1934), Canadian architect and urban conservationist
- Mike Fish, Australian rugby league player
