= Michael Meeks =

Michael Meeks may refer to:

- Michael Meeks (basketball) (born 1972), Canadian former basketball player
- Michael Meeks (software developer), British software developer
