= Michael Donnellan =

Michael Donnellan may refer to:

- Michael Donnellan (politician) (1900–1964), Irish Clann na Talmhan politician
- Michael Donnellan (footballer) (born 1977), inter-county Gaelic footballer for Galway, grandson of the above
- Michael Donnellan (fashion designer) (1915–1985), Irish-born London fashion designer often known simply as "Michael"
- Mick Donnellan, Irish playwright
