= Michael Mercer =

Michael Mercer may refer to:

- Mike Mercer (American football) (1935–2024), American football player
- Mike Mercer (basketball) (born 1986), American basketball player
- Mike Mercer (shot putter) (born 1947), Canadian shot putter
- Mick Mercer, journalist and author
