= Michael Simms =

Michael Simms may refer to:

- Michael Simms (boxer) (born 1974), American boxer
- Michael Simms (publisher) (born 1954), American poet and literary publisher
- Mike Simms, Major League Baseball outfielder
