= Michael Marcus =

Michael Marcus may refer to:

- Michael Marcus (politician) (1894–1960), Scottish Labour party MP for Dundee 1929–1931
- Michael Marcus (musician) (born 1952), American jazz musician
- Michael Marcus (actor), English actor
- Michael Marcus (trader) (1956–2023), American commodities trader
