= Michael Clayton (disambiguation) =

Michael Clayton is a 2007 film starring George Clooney.

Michael Clayton may also refer to:

- Mike Clayton (golfer) (born 1957), Australian professional golfer
- Michael Clayton (American football) (born 1982), former American football wide receiver
- Michael Clayton II (born 2007), American football player
- Michael Clayton (soundtrack), the soundtrack for the film
