= Michael Lin =

Michael Lin may refer to:

- Michael Lin (mathematician) (born 1942), Israeli mathematician
- Michael Lin (artist) (born 1964), Taiwanese artist
- Michael Z. Lin (born 1973), Taiwanese-American scientist
