= Michael Schick =

Michael Schick may refer to:

- Michael Schick (footballer) (born 1988), German footballer
- Michael Schick (physicist) (fl. 1960s–2010s), American physicist
