= Michael Marra =

Michael Marra may refer to:

- Michael Marra (singer-songwriter) (1952–2012), Scottish singer-songwriter
- Michael Marra (politician), Scottish politician
