= Mike McEwen =

Mike McEwen may refer to:

- Mike McEwen (ice hockey) (born 1956), retired Canadian ice hockey player
- Mike McEwen (curler) (born 1980), Canadian curler
