= Michael O'Farrell =

Michael O'Farrell may refer to:

- Michael O'Farrell (bishop) (1865–1928), Australian suffragan bishop
- Michael O'Farrell (biker) (1949–1989), American outlaw biker
- Michael J. O'Farrell (1832–1894), Irish-born Roman Catholic bishop; first Bishop of Trenton
