= Michael Hogg (disambiguation) =

Michael Hogg (born 1954) is a British social psychologist.

Michael Hogg may also refer to:

- Michael Lindsay-Hogg (born 1940), 5th baronet, film and TV director
- Sir Michael David Hogg, 8th Baronet (1925–2001) of the Hogg baronets
