= Michael Fürtbauer =

Austrian politician (born 1972)

Member of the National Council
- Incumbent
- Assumed office 24 October 2024
- Constituency: Upper Austria

Personal details
- Born: 5 February 1972 (age 54)
- Party: Freedom Party

Michael Fürtbauer (born 5 February 1972) is an Austrian politician of the Freedom Party serving as a member of the National Council since 2024. He has been a municipal councillor of Ohlsdorf since 1991.
