= Michael Snyder =

Michael Snyder may refer to:

- Michael Snyder (accountant) (born 1950), British businessman and politician
- Michael James Snyder (1950–2018), American business executive
- Michael P. Snyder (born 1955), American genomicist, systems biologist, and entrepreneur
