= Michael Sweet (disambiguation) =

Michael Sweet may refer to:

- Michael Sweet (born 1963), American Christian rock singer and Stryper frontman
  - Michael Sweet (album), his self-titled 1994 album
- Michael Ernest Sweet (born 1979), Canadian educator and photographer
- Michael Sweet (programmer), computer scientist and CUPS developer
