= Michael Leighton (disambiguation) =

Michael Leighton is an ice hockey goaltender.

Michael Leighton may also refer to:

- Michael Leighton (politician) (1954–2014), Australian politician
- Michael Leighton of the Leighton baronets
