= Michael Pitts =

Michael Pitts may refer to:

- Michael Pitts (pastor) (born 1964), Cornerstone Church pastor
- Michael Pitts (politician) (born 1955), member of the South Carolina House of Representatives
- Mike Pitts (born 1960), American football player
- Mike Pitts (archaeologist), British prehistory archaeologist
