= Michael Ritchie =

Mike or Michael Ritchie may refer to:

- Michael Ritchie (filmmaker) (1938–2001), American director, producer and writer
- Michael Ritchie (artistic director) (born 1957), American theatre manager
- Mike Ritchie, New Zealand national decathlon champion in 1979
- Mike Ritchie (born 1959), Scottish footballer in 2006 Scottish Challenge Cup Final
- Michael G. Ritchie (born 1962), Scottish evolutionary biologist
- Michael Ritchie (shinty) (born 1972), Scottish goalkeeper
