= Michael Tyler (disambiguation) =

Michael Tyler is an American singer and songwriter.

Michael or Mike Tyler may refer to:

- Michael J. Tyler, South Australian academic
- Mike Tyler, non-academic, post-beat American poet
- Ty Hensley (Michael Tyler Hensley, born 1993), American baseball player
- Michael Lawrence Tyler, real name of Mystikal, American rapper and actor
