= Michael Fagan (disambiguation) =

Michael Fagan (born 1948), Buckingham Palace intruder.

Michael Fagan may also refer to:

- Mike Fagan (born 1980), American bowler
- Michael Fagan, software designer who invented the Fagan inspection, a software inspection process
