= Michael Houghton (disambiguation) =

Sir Michael Houghton (born 1949) is a British virologist, co-discoverer of hepatitis C, and Nobel laureate.

Michael Houghton may also refer to:

- Michael Houghton (bishop) (1949–1999), English Anglican priest, bishop of Ebbsfleet, 1998–1999
- Mike Houghton (born 1979), American football player

== See also ==
- Houghton (surname)
