= Michael Bowden =

Michael Bowden may refer to:

- Michael Bowden (footballer) (1947–2020), Australian rules footballer
- Michael Bowden (baseball) (born 1986), American baseball pitcher
