= Michael Epstein =

Michael Epstein may refer to:

- Sir Anthony Epstein (Michael Anthony Epstein, 1921–2024), one of the discoverers of the Epstein-Barr virus
- Mike Epstein (born 1967), former Major League Baseball player
- Michael J. Epstein (born 1976), scientist, filmmaker and musician
- Mikhail Epstein, a Russian-American literary scholar and essayist
