= Michael Wiley =

Michael Wiley may refer to:

- Michael Wiley (running back, born 1978), American football player
- Michael Wiley (running back, born 2000), American football player
- Michael Wiley (author) (21st century), American novelist and academic
- Michael Wiley (basketball) (born 1957), American basketball player
