= Mike Ashley =

Mike or Michael Ashley may refer to:

- Mike Ashley (businessman) (born 1964), English billionaire owner of various sports-related shop chains
- Mike Ashley (writer) (born 1948), British researcher and editor of science fiction and dark fantasy
- Michael Ashley (astronomer), Australian astronomer, famous for his work in Antarctica
