= Michael Decker =

Michael Decker may refer to:

- Michael P. Decker (born 1944), former member of the North Carolina General Assembly
- Michael H. Decker, current Assistant to the Secretary of Defense for Intelligence Oversight
- Michael Decker, historian known for his views on the Arab Agricultural Revolution
