= Michael Aguilar =

Michael Aguilar may refer to:

- Double-O (born Michael Aguilar), American producer and one half of the hip-hop group Kidz in the Hall
- Michael J. Aguilar (born 1950), retired United States Marine Corps brigadier general and the Federal Security Director of San Diego International Airport
- Michael Quintero (born Michael Quintero Aguilar in 1980), Colombian professional tennis player
- Michael Aguilar (athlete) (born 1979), Belizean athlete who shares a national record in the 4x100 meter relay
