= Michael Paul =

Michael Paul may refer to:

- Michael Paul (sprinter) (born 1957), Trinidad and Tobago athlete
- Michael Paul (scientist), political scientist and fellow at the German Institute for International and Security Affairs
- Michael Paul (handballer) (born 1961), German handball player
- Mike Paul (born 1945), baseball player
