= Michael O'Hanlon =

Michael O'Hanlon may refer to:

- Michael E. O'Hanlon (born 1961), American academic and political writer
- Michael F. O'Hanlon (1890–1967), Irish politician
- Mick O'Hanlon, Irish hurler and Gaelic footballer
