= Michael Merritt =

Michael Merritt may refer to:

- Mike Merritt (musician) (born 1955), American bassist
- Michael Merritt (American football) (born 1984), American football tight end
