= Michael Carlin =

Michael Carlin may refer to:

- Mike Carlin (born 1958), comic book writer and editor
- Michael Carlin (art director), Australian art director
