= Mike Sanders =

Mike Sanders may refer to:

- Mike Sanders (basketball) (born 1960), American basketball player
- Mike Sanders (Missouri politician) (born 1967), Jackson County politician
- Mike Sanders (wrestler) (born 1969), American stand-up comedian and wrestler
- Michael Sinclair Sanders (born 1939), British amateur archaeologist
- Mike Sanders (Oklahoma politician)
