= Michael O'Regan =

Michael O'Regan may refer to:

- Michael O'Regan (businessman)
- Michael O'Regan (journalist)
- Michael O'Regan (Medal of Honor)
