= Michael John =

Michael John may refer to:

- Michael John (historian) born 1954), Austrian historian
- Michael John (bishop) (1925–2013), Bishop of East Kerala, India
- Michael John (politician) (1943–2003), Australian politician
- Michael John (trade unionist) (1903–1977), Indian trade unionist and politician
- Michael John Gray (born 1976), American politician, member of the Arkansas House of Representatives

== See also ==
- John (surname)
