= Michael Golding =

Michael Golding may refer to:

- Michael Golding (novelist), American novelist
- Michael Golding (footballer), English footballer
