= Michael Chan =

Michael Chan may refer to:

- Michael Chan, Baron Chan (1940–2006), Singaporean-British physician and politician
- Michael Chan (Canadian politician) (born 1951), Canadian politician
- Michael Paul Chan (born 1950), American film and television actor
- Michael Chan (actor) (born 1946), Hong Kong actor
