= Michael Parkinson (disambiguation) =

Michael Parkinson (1935–2023) was an English television and radio personality.

Michael Parkinson may also refer to:

- Michaël Parkinson (born 1991), Dutch volleyball player
- Mike Parkinson (1948–2009), New Zealand rugby union player
