= Michael Eggert =

Michael Eggert may refer to:

- Michael Eggert (businessman) (born 1975), businessman from Copenhagen, Denmark
- Michael Eggert (footballer) (born 1952), retired German footballer
