= Michael McHugh (disambiguation) =

Michael McHugh may refer to:

- Michael McHugh (born 1935), Australian judge
- Michael McHugh (footballer) (born 1971), Irish footballer
- Mike McHugh (born 1965), American ice hockey player
