= Michael Mansfield (disambiguation) =

Michael Mansfield (born 1941) is an English barrister.

Michael or Mike Mansfield may also refer to:

- Michael Mansfield (footballer) (born 1971), Australian rules footballer
- Mike Mansfield (Michael Joseph Mansfield, 1903–2001), American Democratic senator from Montana
- Mike Mansfield, British television producer, known for TV series Supersonic
- Michael Mansfield (diplomat), New Zealand high commissioner
