= Michael East =

Michael East may refer to:

- Michael East (composer) (c. 1580–1648), English organist and composer
- Michael East (athlete) (born 1978), British middle-distance runner
