= Michael Marsh =

Michael or Mike Marsh may refer to:

- Michael Marsh (sprinter) (born 1967), US-American sprinter and Olympic champion
- Michael Marsh (journalist), television news anchor on WBRZ-TV
- Mike Marsh (footballer) (born 1969), former Liverpool and Southend footballer
- Mike Marsh (musician) (born 1974), drummer of the band Dashboard Confessional
- Mike Marsh, a member of the New Hampshire House of Representatives
- Michael Newton Marsh, British professor
