= Michael O'Gorman =

Michael O'Gorman may refer to:

- Michael O'Gorman (footballer)
- Michael O'Gorman (rowing)
