= Michael Kruger =

Michael Kruger may refer to:

- Michael J. Kruger, American theologian
- Michael Krüger (footballer) (born 1954), German football coach and former player
- Michael Krüger (writer) (born 1943), German writer, publisher and translator
