= Michael Abber =

American comedian

- Born: 1997 or 1998 (age 28–29)
- Occupation: Comedian

Instagram information
- Page: roommatecourt
- Followers: 14 thousand

TikTok information
- Page: Roommate Court
- Years active: 2025–present
- Followers: 11 thousand
- Last updated: April 26, 2026

Michael Abber (born 1997/1998) is an American comedian.

In May 2025, Abber began the video series Roommate Court on Instagram and TikTok, posting his first video on May 6, 2025, where he played as a judge on the series's debuted roommate case Dennis v. Maisie. After posting his first video, he gained popularity and his series went viral, posting more roommate cases and gaining over 10,000 followers on TikTok.

Abber is of Jewish descent, and identifies as a queer.
