= Michael Legge =

Michael Legge may refer to:

- Michael Legge (comedian) (born 1968), Northern Irish comedian
- Michael Legge (actor) (born 1978), Northern Ireland-born actor
- Michael Legge (filmmaker) (born 1953), American actor and independent filmmaker

== See also ==
- Mike Legg (born 1975), ice hockey player
