= Michael Foot (disambiguation) =

Michael Foot (1913–2010) was a British politician and journalist.

Michael Foot may also refer to:

- M. R. D. Foot (Michael Richard Daniell Foot, 1919–2012), British historian

== See also ==
- Michael Foote (born 1963), American paleontologist and author
- Mike Foote, American politician
