= Michael Wilkinson =

Michael or Mike Wilkinson may refer to:

- Michael Wilkinson (costume designer), Australian Oscar-nominated costume designer
- Michael Wilkinson (rower) (born 1986), Canadian Olympic rower
- Mike Wilkinson (basketball) (born 1981), American basketball player
- Mike Wilkinson (fighter) (born 1987), English mixed martial artist
- Michael Wilkinson (born 1988), Nonprofit leader and former Daily Telegraph journalist
