= Michael Marten =

Michael Marten may refer to

- Michael Marten, founder of the Science Photo Library
- Michael Marten, former leader of the Iona Community
