= Michael Savage (disambiguation) =

Michael Savage is an American radio host, author and conservative political commentator.

Michael Savage may also refer to:

- Michael Joseph Savage (1872–1940), Prime Minister of New Zealand, 1935–1940
- Michael Savage (sociologist) (born 1959), British sociologist and academic
- Mike Savage (politician) (born 1960), Canadian politician
- Michael Savage (Gaelic footballer) (born 1986), Gaelic football goalkeeper with Dublin
