= Michael Rank =

Michael Rank may refer to:

- Michael Rank (author), British author
- Michael Rank (musician), American musician
- Mike Rankin, a Scottish footballer
