= Michael Knox =

Michael Knox may refer to:

- Michael D. Knox (born 1946), American psychologist and professor
- Michael Knox (software businessman) (1961–2009), American software businessman and expert
- Michael Knox (record producer), American record producer
- Mike Knox (born 1978), American wrestler
- Mike Knox (politician), Houston politician
- Mickey Knox (1921–2013), actor who fell victim to the Hollywood blacklist
