= Michael Kaiser (disambiguation) =

Michael Kaiser is an American arts administrator and former president of the John F. Kennedy Center for the Performing Arts.

Michael Kaiser may also refer to:

- Mike Kaiser (born 1963), Australian politician
- Michael Kaiser, a fictional character in the Blue Lock manga series
