= Michael Maskell =

Michael Maskell may refer to:

- Michael Maskell (footballer) (1952–2017), English footballer
- Michael Maskell (sport shooter) (born 1966), Barbadian sport shooter
