= Mikeyy =

Computer worm

Mikeyy is the name of a computer worm that spread approximately 10,000 automated messages ( or "tweets") across social networking and microblogging website Twitter.com in four discrete attacks "between 2 AM Saturday April 11, 2009 Pacific time and early Monday (April 14, 2009) morning" before it was "identified and deleted". The tweets promoted a website called StalkDaily.

The worm was written by 17-year-old Michael Mooney who operates a website to point out vulnerabilities in Twitter while advertising his website.
