= Mike Potts =

Mike or Michael Potts may refer to:

- Michael Potts (actor), American actor
- Michael Potts (footballer) (born 1991), English footballer
- Mike Potts (baseball) (born 1970), former left-handed Major League Baseball relief pitcher
- Mike Potts (American football) (born 1985), American football quarterback
- Michael Potts (diplomat), Australian diplomat
