= Michael Kagan (disambiguation) =

Michael Kagan (born 1944) is an American actor.

Michael Kagan is also the name of:

- Michael G. Kagan (fl. from 2011), American academic and immigrant rights lawyer
- Michael Kagan (artist) (born 1980), American artist
