= Michael Redmond =

Michael Redmond may refer to:

- Michael Redmond (comedian) (born 1950), Irish stand-up comedian and actor
- Michael Redmond (Go player) (born 1963), American professional Go player
- Michael Redmond (politician), Canadian politician
- Mike Redmond (born 1971), former Major League Baseball catcher
- Mickey Redmond (born 1947), former professional hockey player
