= Roche (surname) =

Roche is a surname of Norman origin.

Notable people with this surname include:

- The Roches, vocal trio, sisters Maggie, Terre and Suzzy Roche
- Roche baronets, baronetcy of Great Britain
- Adair Roche, Baron Roche (1871–1956), British judge
- Adi Roche, (born 1955), Irish politician
- Albert Severin Roche (1895–1939), French soldier
- Alexandra Roche, Lady Roche (born 1934), British philanthropist
- Anthony Roche (born 17 1976), Australian footballer
- Arthur Roche (born 1950), English Catholic bishop and cardinal
- Sir Boyle Roche, 1st Baronet, Irish politician and wit
- Charlotte Roche (born 1978), German television presenter, actress, singer and author
- Christine Roche (born 1939), French-Canadian illustrator, cartoonist, teacher and filmmaker
- Collette Roche, British businesswoman
- Daniel Roche (historian) (1935–2023), French social and cultural historian
- Daniel Roche (born 1999), English child actor
- Danni Roche (born 1970), Australian field hockey player
- David Roche (disambiguation), multiple people
- Des Roche, ice hockey player
- Dick Roche (born 1947), Irish politician
- Douglas Roche (born 1929), Canadian peace activist and politician
- Édouard Roche (1820–1883), French scientist
- Elijah Roche (born 2008), Canadian soccer player
- Ellen Roche, Irish biomedical engineer
- Eric Roche (1967–2005), Irish guitarist
- Ernest Roche (1850–1917), French engraver and politician
- Eugene Roche (1928–2004), American actor
- Eustachius Roche (fl. 1580–1600), Flemish mining engineer
- France Roche (1921–2013), French actress and screenwriter
- Frank Roche (born 1959), American writer
- Helen Roche, British historian
- Imelda Roche (born c. 1935), Australian businesswoman
- Jake Roche (born 1992), English singer-songwriter and actor and lead vocalist of Rixton
- James G. Roche (born 1939), American politician
- John Roche (disambiguation), multiple people
- Juliette Roche (1884–1980), French painter and writer
- Karl Roche (1862–1931), German syndicalist
- Kevin Roche (1922–2019), American architect
- Kevin Roche (footballer) (born 1947), Australian rules footballer
- Kyle Roche (born 1987), American attorney
- Maree Roche, New Zealand management scholar
- Marilyn Roche (died 2003), American politician
- Michael Roche (disambiguation), multiple people
- Michel Roche (1939–2004), French equestrian
- Mikaël Roche (born 1982), Tahitian footballer
- Mike Roche, American actor
- Mike Roche (runner) (born 1953), American middle-distance runner
- Nicolas Roche, Irish cyclist
- Pierre Roche (sculptor) (1855–1922), French sculptor, painter, ceramist and medallist
- Pierre Roche (musician) (1919–2001), French pianist, singer and composer
- Quincy Roche (born 1998), American football player
- Raymond Roche (born 1957), French motorcyclist
- Regina Maria Roche, English novelist
- Roland Roche (born 1952), French skier
- Shane Roche, Gaelic footballer
- Stephen Roche, Irish cyclist
- Thomas C. Roche, American photographer
- Tiger Roche, Irish soldier, adventurer and outlaw
- Tony Roche (born 1945), Australian tennis player and coach
- William Roche (disambiguation), several people
