= Acacia argentina =

Conservation status
- Vulnerable (NCA)

Scientific classification
- Kingdom: Plantae
- Clade: Tracheophytes
- Clade: Angiosperms
- Clade: Eudicots
- Clade: Rosids
- Order: Fabales
- Family: Fabaceae
- Subfamily: Caesalpinioideae
- Clade: Mimosoid clade
- Genus: Acacia
- Species: A. argentina

Binomial name
- Acacia argentina Pedley

Species of legume

Acacia argentina is a species of flowering plant in the family Fabaceae and is endemic to Queensland. It is a shrub with greyish green to silvery blue, bipinnate leaves, yellow flowers arranged in racemes in leaf axils, and linear pods.

== Description ==
Acacia argentina is a shrub that typically grows to a height of up to 4 m (13 ft). It has glaucous branchlets with a sparse to moderate covering of spreading hairs 0.3–0.5 mm (0.012–0.020 in) long. The leaves are bipinnate, greyish green to silvery blue, 8–24 mm (0.31–0.94 in) long on a petiole 3–8 mm (0.12–0.31 in) long with two or three pairs of pinnae 13–20 mm (0.51–0.79 in) long, each with six to nine pairs of oblong leaflets 6–9 mm (0.24–0.35 in) long and 1.4–2.8 mm (0.055–0.110 in) wide. The flowers are borne in racemes with up to eight branches 20–55 mm (0.79–2.17 in) long. Each head has 20 to 24 yellow flowers on a peduncle 3–5 mm (0.12–0.20 in) long. Flowering has been recorded in July and September, and the fruit is a linear pod up to 60 mm (2.4 in) long. The species resembles Acacia chinchillensis but is taller with wider leaflets.

== Taxonomy ==
Acacia argentina was first formally described in 2006 by Leslie Pedley in the journal Austrobaileya from specimens collected on "Jarwood" Station in the Leichhardt district by Paul Irwin Forster. The specific epithet (argentina) means 'resembling silver', referring to the foliage of this species.

== Distribution and habitat ==
The species has a limited range and is only found in a small area in the sandstone parts of the upper catchment areas of smaller tributaries of the Dawson River to the north of Taroom in south western Queensland.

== Conservation status ==
Acacia argentina is listed as "vulnerable" under the Queensland Government Nature Conservation Act 1992.

== See also ==
- List of Acacia species
