= Roché =

Roché is a surname and given name. Notable people with the name include:

surname

- Betty Roché (1918–1999), American blues singer
- Brisa Roché (born 1976), American singer-songwriter
- Henri-Pierre Roché (1879–1959), French author
- Sebastian Roché (born 1964), French actor

given name

- Roché Emanuelson (born 1982), Surinamese footballer

== See also ==
- Roche (surname)
