= William Roche =

William Roche or Bill Roche may refer to:

- Bill Roche (c. 1935–2022), Australian businessman
- William Roche (Irish politician) (1775-1850), Member of the UK Parliament for Limerick City
- William Roche (mayor) (by 1478–1549), Lord Mayor of London and MP
- William Roche (Nova Scotia politician) (1842–1925), Canadian politician in Halifax, Nova Scotia
- William Roche (rugby union) (1895–1983), Irish rugby union player
- William James Roche (1859–1937), Canadian politician and Conservative Member of Parliament for the Manitoba riding of Marquette

== See also ==
- William Roach (disambiguation)
