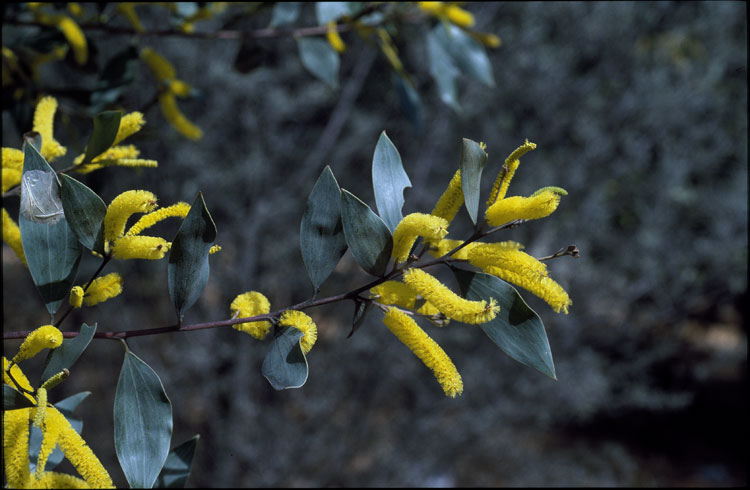

Scientific classification
- Kingdom: Plantae
- Clade: Embryophytes
- Clade: Tracheophytes
- Clade: Spermatophytes
- Clade: Angiosperms
- Clade: Eudicots
- Clade: Rosids
- Order: Fabales
- Family: Fabaceae
- Subfamily: Caesalpinioideae
- Clade: Mimosoid clade
- Genus: Acacia
- Species: A. striatifolia

Binomial name
- Acacia striatifolia Pedley
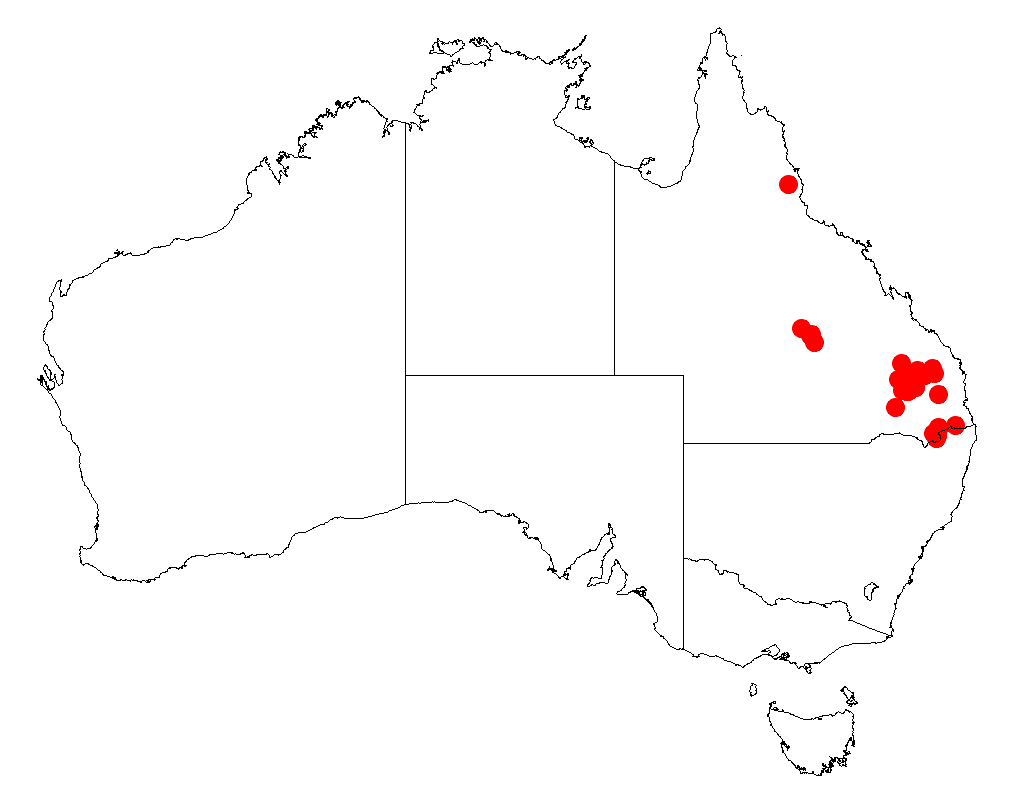
- Occurrence data from AVH

= Acacia striatifolia =

Species of legume

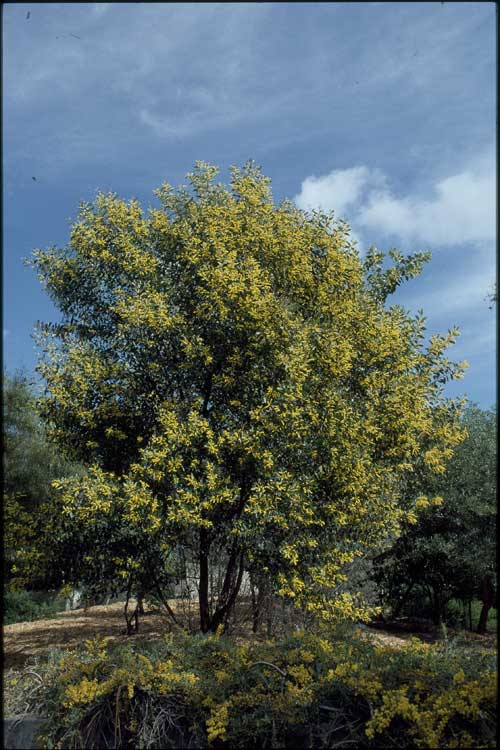
Habit in Mount Annan Botanic Garden

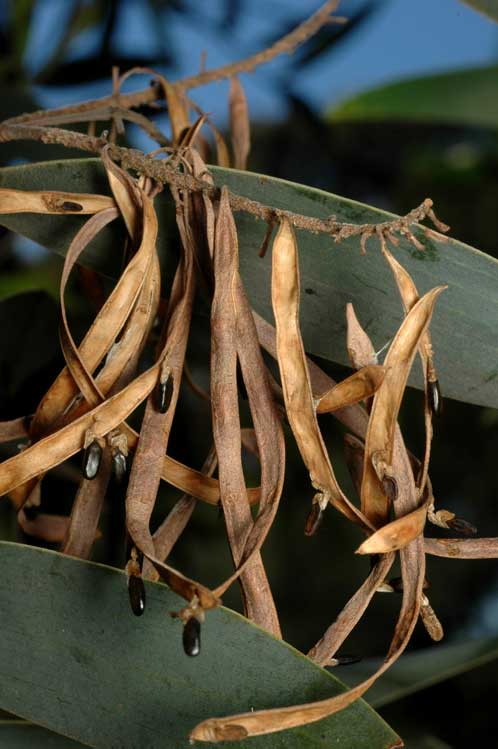
Seed pods and seed in the Australian National Botanic Gardens

Acacia striatifolia is a shrub or tree belonging to the genus Acacia and the subgenus Juliflorae that is native to north eastern Australia.

== Description ==
The shrub or tree typically grows to a maximum height of 8 m (26 ft) and has dark grey coloured bark that has a corrugated texture. It has dark red-brown branchlets that are angular to flattened towards the apices with non-prominent ridges and are densely papillose. Like most species of Acacia it has phyllodes rather than true leaves. The blue-green phyllodes have a narrowly elliptic or elliptic shape and are straight with a length of 3.9 to 9.5 cm (1.5 to 3.7 in) and a width of 10 to 40 mm (0.39 to 1.57 in). The glabrous phyllodes are papillose especially around the base and pulvinus and have three to five prominent longitudinal nerves. It blooms between August and September producing golden flowers. The cylindrical flower-spikes have a length of 3 to 5 cm (1.2 to 2.0 in) packed with deep yellow coloured flowers. The chartaceous and glabrous seed pods that form after flowering have a linear shape and are straight-sided and constricted between and raised over the seeds. The pods are 3 to 8.5 cm (1.2 to 3.3 in) in length and 3 to 3.5 mm (0.12 to 0.14 in) wide and contain brownish to black seeds with a narrowly oblong shape with a length of 4 to 4.5 mm (0.16 to 0.18 in).

== Distribution ==
It is endemic to the Darling Downs district of Queensland where it is situated on undulating or hilly country within the state forests to the north of Chinchilla where it grows in shallow, sandy and gravelly soils as a part of Eucalyptus woodland communities or in dense stands.

== See also ==
- List of Acacia species
