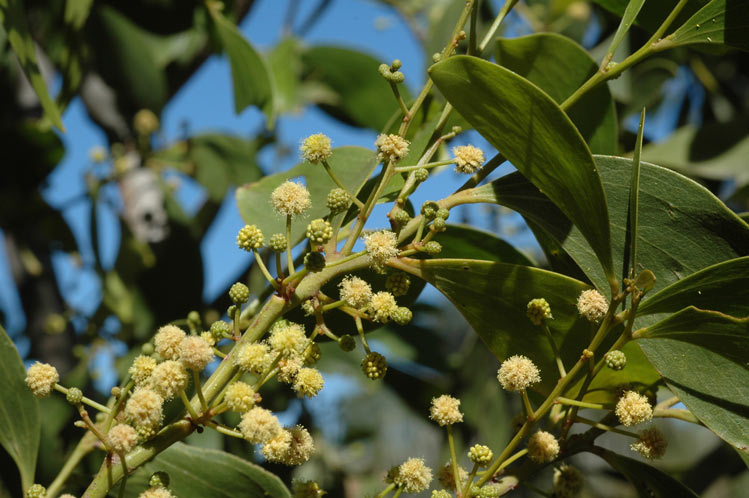
- In Mount Annan Botanic Garden

Scientific classification
- Kingdom: Plantae
- Clade: Tracheophytes
- Clade: Angiosperms
- Clade: Eudicots
- Clade: Rosids
- Order: Fabales
- Family: Fabaceae
- Subfamily: Caesalpinioideae
- Clade: Mimosoid clade
- Genus: Acacia
- Species: A. oraria

Binomial name
- Acacia oraria F.Muell.
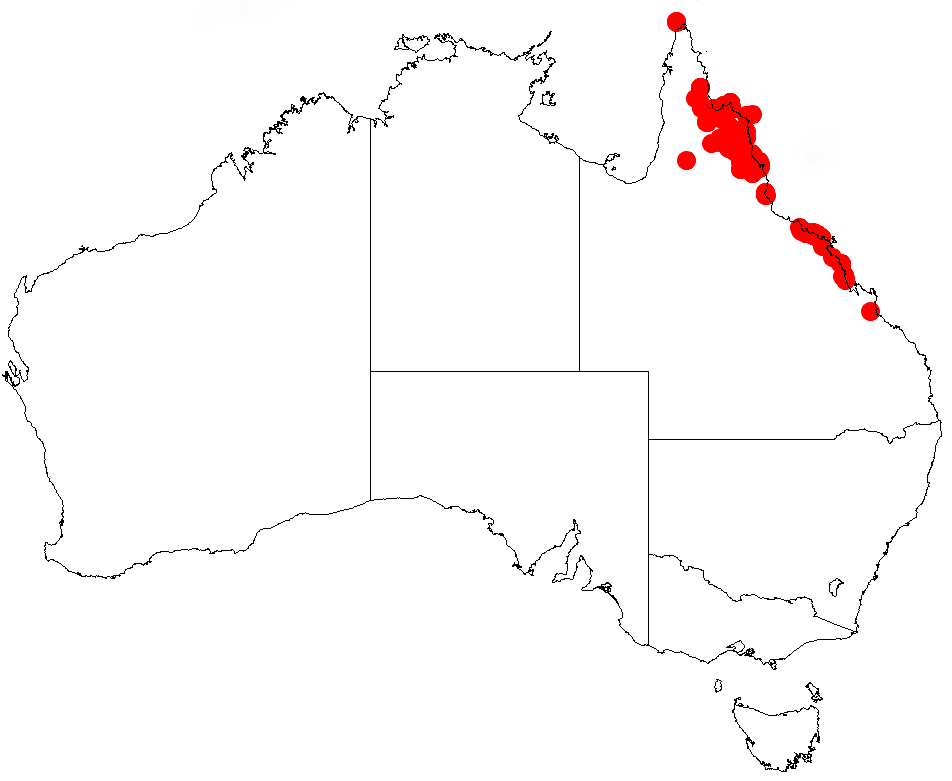
- Occurrence in Australia data from AVH

Synonyms
- Acacia oraria var. amblyphylla Domin; Acacia oraria F.Muell. var. oraria; Acacia oraria var. typica Domin nom. inval.; Racosperma orarium (F.Muell.) Pedley

= Acacia oraria =

Species of legume

Acacia oraria, commonly known as coastal wattle, is a species of flowering plant in the family Fabaceae, and is native to northern Queensland, Australia, and on the islands of Flores and Timor. It is a spreading tree with fibrous, fissured bark, scaly white branchlets, egg-shaped to narrowly elliptic phyllodes, spherical heads of cream-coloured to pale yellow flowers and openly coiled to twisted, scaly pods.

== Description ==
Acacia oraria is a spreading tree that typically grows to a height of 3 to 10 m (9.8 to 32.8 ft) and a dbh of up to 30 cm (12 in). It has fibrous, fissured bark and white scaly branchlets. Its phyllodes are egg-shaped with the narrower end towards the base to narrowly elliptic, mostly 50–80 mm (2.0–3.1 in) long, 15–35 mm (0.59–1.38 in) wide, glabrous, scaly when young, with three or more main veins and a gland near the base. The flowers are borne in spherical head in axils on a raceme 8–18 mm (0.31–0.71 in) long, with three to five branches, on peduncles 4–11 mm (0.16–0.43 in) long. Each head is about 5 mm (0.20 in) in diameter with 30 to 45 cream-coloured to pale yellow flowers. The pods are openly coiled to twisted, up to 120 mm (4.7 in) long, 10–15 mm (0.39–0.59 in) wide and scaly with prominent margins. The seeds are about 4 mm (0.16 in) long and black with a red or orange aril completely encircling the seed.

== Taxonomy ==
Acacia oraria was first formally described in 1879 by Ferdinand von Mueller in his Fragmenta Phytographiae Australiae. The specific epithet (oraria) means 'pertaining to the coast'.

== Distribution and habitat ==
Coastal wattle occurs in several disjunct areas along the eastern coast of Queensland north of latitude 22°S, extending north of the Atherton Tableland, also South East Asia including Flores in Indonesia and in Timor.

== Uses ==
The tree is grown as a street tree or ornamental in Indonesia and is known to coppice quite well. It has a symbiotic relationship with some bacteria that form nodules on the roots and can fix nitrogen into the soil. As for most species of Acacia the bark contains quantities of tannins and are astringent and can be used to treat diarrhoea and dysentery.

== See also ==
- List of Acacia species
