= Linda Klarfeld =

Australian sculptor (born 1978)

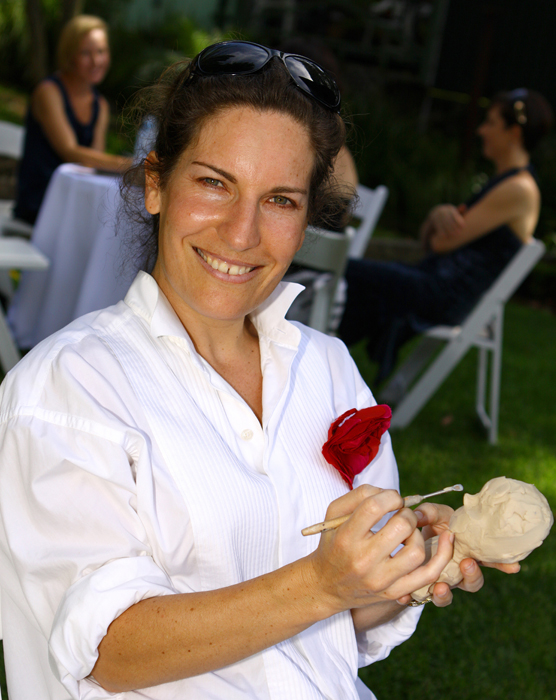
- Linda Klarfeld at the Australian Ballet Garden Party 2011
- Born: 1 July 1978 (age 47); Prague, Czechoslovakia
- Citizenship: Australian and Czech (dual)
- Occupation: Sculptor
- Years active: 1994 – present
- Website: www.lindaklarfeld.com

Linda Klarfeld (born 1 July 1978) is an Australian sculptor whose bronze and granite works of art focus on the human figure. Her work ranges from small miniature portrait busts to three meter high, larger than life size pieces. She has sold her work both privately and through public auction.

== Early life and education ==
Born in Prague, Czechoslovakia, Klarfeld's family immigrated to Australia in 1980. Her father was a drummer with various rock bands including Framus Five and The Cardinals, and Klarfeld credits his influence on her developing creativity.

Her family settled in Sydney, where she attended Bonnyrigg Public School and Chatswood High School. Her parents encouraged her to pursue her creativity, so after leaving high school she began a seven-year-long sculpture apprenticeship that introduced her to different sculptors from around the world. She studied under sculptors Ctibor Havelka and Vaclav Skalicky and sculpture technician Vanessa Hoheb. She studied at the Střední průmyslová škola kamenická a sochařská v Hořicích, an international Stone Sculptors School in Horice, Czech Republic.

== Career ==
1988 – 1995 (Teenage Years)

At the age of 14 Klarfeld sold her first sculpture and shortly after announced to her family her intention of becoming a sculptor. She won several prizes for her work during her teenage years. Portrait busts she created of her father were exhibited in ArtExpress 1994. She won major prizes for Senior Sculpture at the Mosman Youth Art Prize for her sculptures ‘King Lear’, ‘Adolescent’ and ‘The Joyful Season’.

1996 – 2005 (Twenties)

Klarfeld was awarded a Bachelor of Arts in Psychology from Macquarie University. She said that studying psychology, especially human behaviour, enriched her art. “I learned to observe people more closely” she said. “I was inspired to create the Macquarie University Graduates while watching the procession at my own graduation ceremony.”

During this time, a number of significant events occurred in Klarfeld's life. One such event was she met Joan Abela, who became a patron of her work and provided the impetus for Klarfeld's career. Ms Abela commissioned a series of sculptures for her private castle-themed residence, ”Jeandare”.

At the age of 21, Klarfeld's first solo exhibition was opened by Australian Adventurer Dick Smith.

At 22, Klarfeld received her first major religious commission to create “Gethsemane and The Way of the Cross 2000”. This was followed by numerous public commissions including a life-size bronze sculpture of Rugby League Footballer Peter Gallagher and 'Expressions of Love', a 16 statue centerpiece for the Hunter Valley Gardens.

2006 – 2015 (Thirties)

Klarfeld created several sculptures of well-known Australians, including Dr Victor Chang, Cricketers Keith Miller and Bill Woodfull, AFL Footballer Neil Roberts and former Mayor of Mosman, Cr Dom Lopez OAM. In her private work she began focusing on the world of business and created the “Board of Directors Series”, a collection of semi-abstract sculptures depicting the archetypes of the business world. This was followed by an exhibition recognizing 11 leading Australian business identities in a collection of realistic portrait busts called “Icons of Business”. During her thirties, Klarfeld has established a reputation amongst religious institutions for her sculptures focusing on emotional and dramatic religious themes. Her well-known religious pieces include St Marcellin Champagnat 2012 and St Mary Mackillop 2011.

== Table Of Works ==
Table Of Works
| Year | Religious | Children | Portrait Busts | Sport | Other |
|---|---|---|---|---|---|
| 1998 - 1995 | Golem | Joyful Season | Daddy's Little Girl | Stating his case | King Lear |
| Teens | | Adolescent | Mr Kassouf | Dusk | Lunatics |
| | | Little Bather | Count Josef von Abraham Sonnenfeld | | Aussie Baroque Nymph |
| | | | | | Aussie Baroque Bacchus |
| 1996 - 2005 | Jesus dies on the cross | Wyatt | William Roche | Golfers | Gandalf Fountain |
| Twenties | Gethsemane and the way of the cross | Expressions of Love | Mr Kassouf | Pedro | DH Lawrence |
| | Victory Christ | Interruption | Dick Smith AO | Sophie | Riders |
| | | Happiness, McGreggor Boys | | Ballet Series | Maquarie University Graduates |
| | | Love, Jacquelin | | Branching Out | Battleship Figurehead |
| | | Tanya, Simpson Boys | | | Tinkerbell |
| 2006 - 2015 | Mater Dei | | Dom Lopez OAM | Neil Roberts | Dr Victor Chang |
| Thirties | Blessed Mary Mackillop | | Lord Alistair McAlpine | Bill Woodfull | Board of Directors Series |
| | Marcellin Champagnat | | Icons of Business | Keith Miller | Manly Graduate |
| | Stations of the Cross | | Wallace Family Statuette | | Tax Man |
| | Angel of Communication | | Audrey & Norman | | Lady Boss |
| | Risen | | | | School Boys |
| | St Jude | | | | Mrs Jen |
| | Stations of the Cross | | | | |
| | Jeanne Marie Chavoin | | | | |
| | St Catherine of Sienna | | | | |
| | Apostle St John | | | | |
| | Mother and Child | | | | |
