= Hunter Valley Gardens =

Botanical garden in New South Wales, Australia

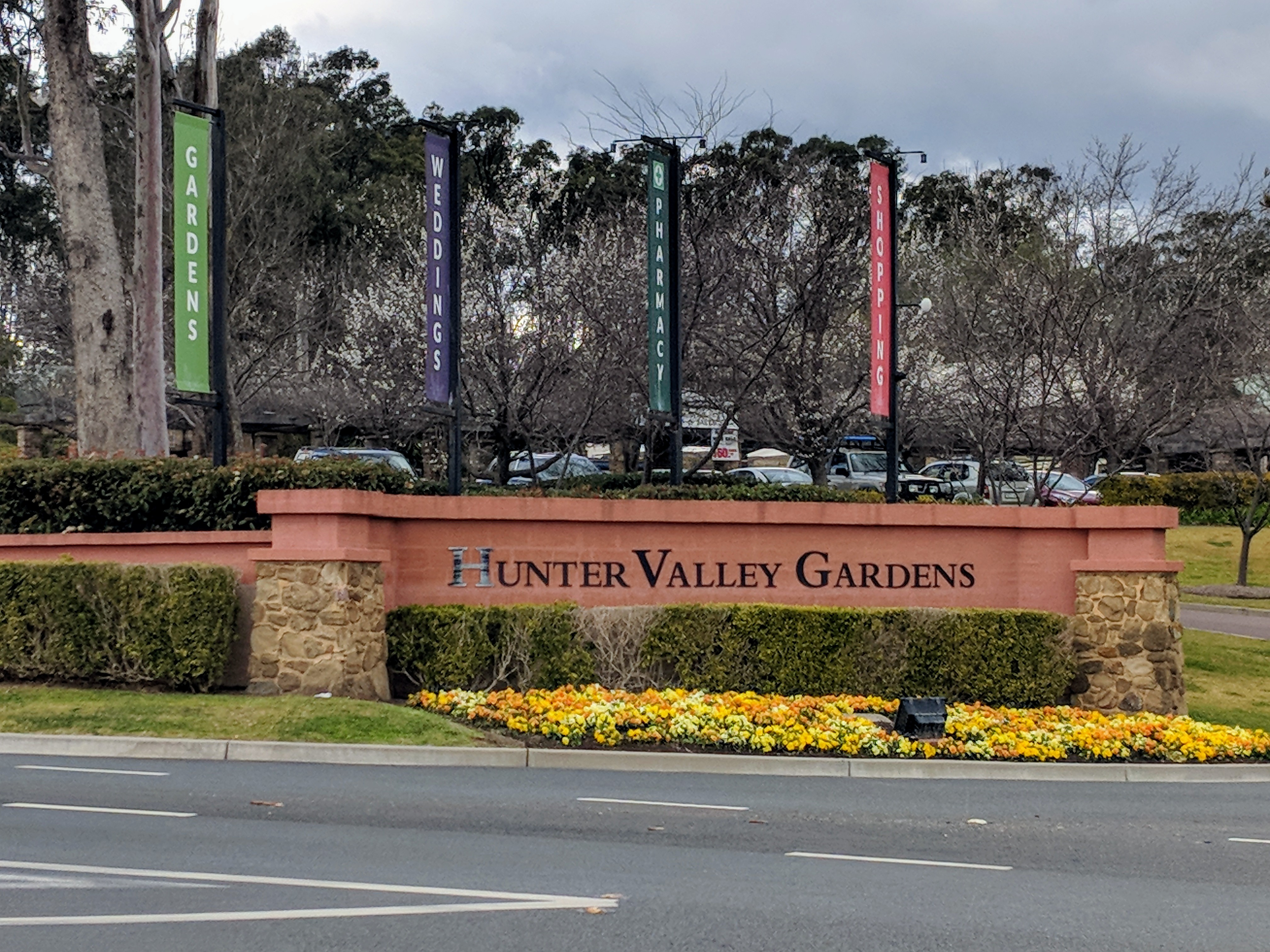
- The sign at the entrance to the gardens

- Location within New South Wales Location within Australia
- Type: Botanical
- Location: Pokolbin
- Coordinates: 32°46′26″S 151°17′44″E
- Area: 14 hectares (35 acres)
- Opened: 2003
- Owner: Bill & Imelda Roche
- Operator: Roche Group
- Visitors: 300,000
- Status: Open all year
- Website: www.huntervalleygardens.com.au

Hunter Valley Gardens is in the heart of the Hunter Valley wine region, located in Pokolbin, New South Wales, Australia. It opened in 2003 and is now open every day of the year except Christmas Day. The gardens span fourteen hectares of land, containing ten differently themed gardens, accommodation, a shopping village, rides, events and dining. The gardens are a popular venue in the Hunter Valley for weddings and other events. Hunter Valley Gardens is the largest display garden in the Southern Hemisphere.

== History ==
Hunter valley gardens was developed and created by the Roche Group, when founders Bill and Imelda Roche retired. He decided that he would finally make his lifelong ambition a reality, building a garden that would be enjoyed for generations to come. Starting construction in 1999, the team of 40–50 landscape gardeners, engineers and architects completed the gardens and it was opened in October 2003 by the Premier of New South Wales, Bob Carr.

== Features ==
=== Gardens ===
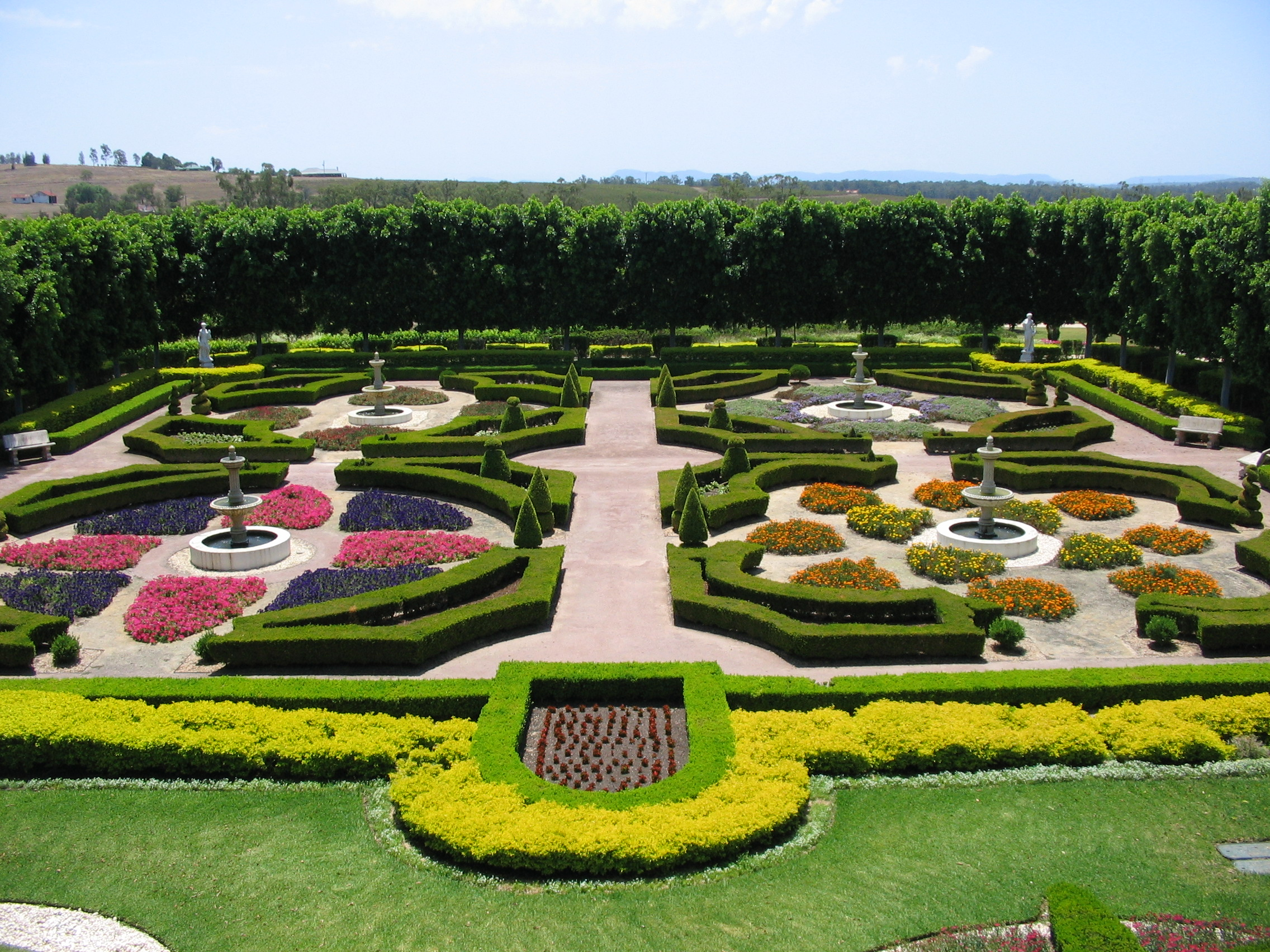
The border garden

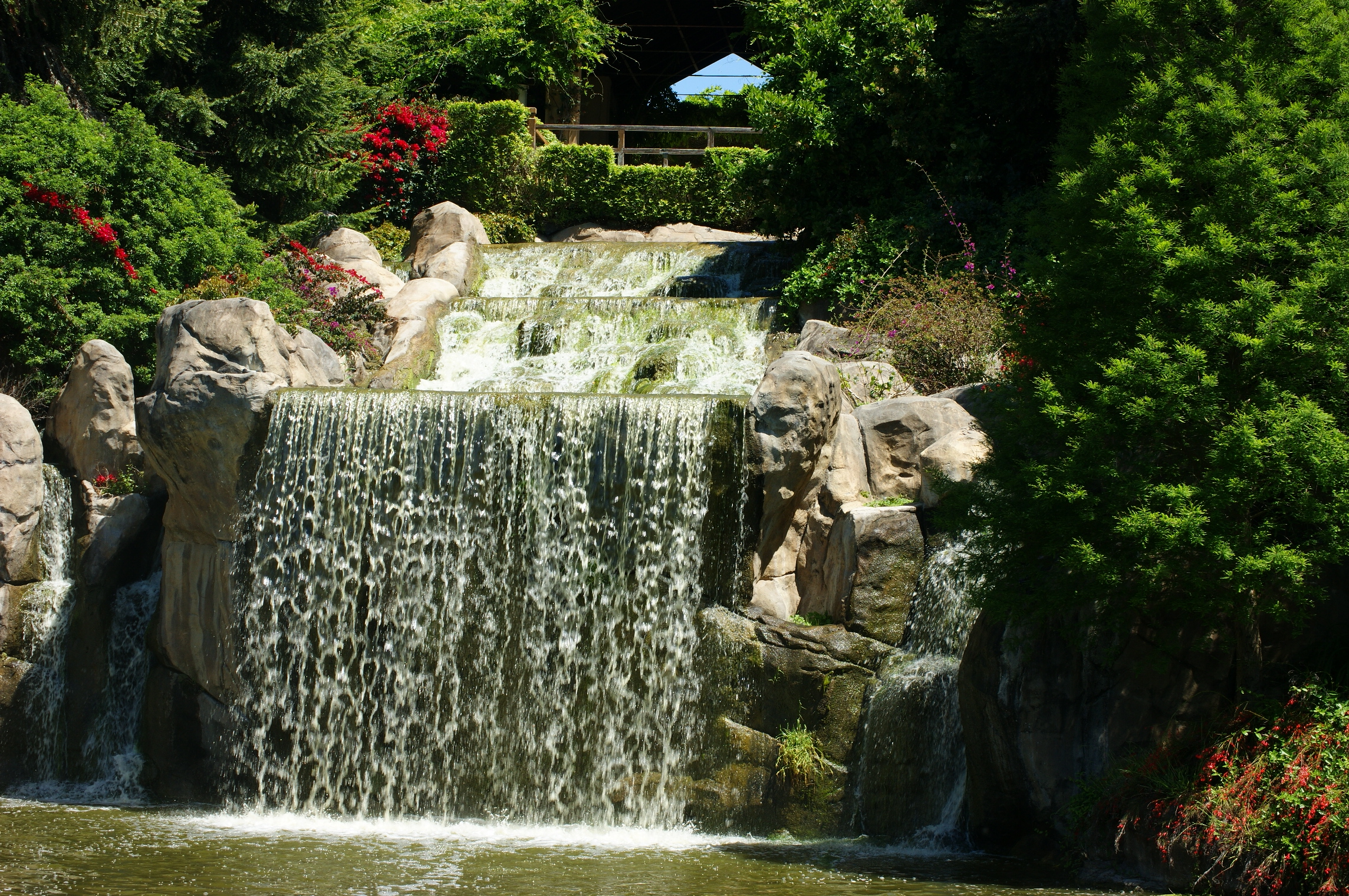
The waterfall garden

The gardens are composed of ten individually themed gardens, influenced by different locations around the world, containing both native and exotic flora. The display gardens are divided by eight kilometres of wheelchair accessible walking paths. There are over six thousand trees, six hundred thousand shrubs and one million ground-covers populating the gardens.

The themed gardens are:

- Border Garden – The Border Garden is designed to imitate the classic French Parterre style of garden, with surrounding manicured box hedging, intertwined with Hill's weeping figs and European boxwood to make interesting shapes and designs. Hand-carved Indian Marble water features and statues that represent the four seasons are displayed throughout the Border Garden.
- Chinese Garden – Patrons enter the Chinese Garden by crossing green Chinese slate and walking through a traditional Moon gate which is flanked by two bronze temple guardians. Slow growing grass, rugged rocks and raked decorative gravels are some of the traditional elements to the garden. Some of the many featured plants include azaleas, Camellia sasanqua, conifers, bamboo, cumquats, persimmons and mulberries.
- Formal Garden – Influenced by garden designs of France and England, the Formal garden is one of the largest of its type in Australia. Manchurian pear trees border the garden with 3000 bushes of chameleon roses, a variety of topiary and manicured lawns making up the features of the garden. A wishing fountain can also be found in the Formal Garden, with all the proceeds donated to charity.
- Indian Garden – The Indian Garden carries aromas of India, having curry plants filling the garden with their scent when you enter through the 160-year-old antique Indian gates with two bronze elephants standing guard. Paths accompanied with lilly pilly hedges lead to a mosaic of pebbles and ground-covering plants and a garden design, containing purple ajuga and variegated dwarf Agapanthus. An Indian tea house with traditional Indian embellishments has an area to sit allowing the visitors to view the garden and topiary elephants.
- Italian Grotto – The Italian Grotto features a statue of Saint Francis of Assisi and is lined with pink Wisterias, red Bougainvillea, lemon, orange and olive trees, lavender, and cascading geraniums and pelargoniums.
- Lakes Walk – The Lakes Walk is surrounded by one and a half kilometres of pathways with the waterway being lined by perennial borders, and containing the Lakes Rotunda. This garden is a common place for weddings to be held.
- Oriental Garden – Influenced by Japanese and Korean gardens, the Oriental Garden contains a two-story traditional Japanese pagoda that is surrounded by a koi pond. Zoysia tenuifolia (Korean velvet grass) fills the garden, mounding itself around rocks and pavers.
- Rose Garden – In the shape of a corkscrew to honour the neighbouring Hunter Valley vineyards, the Rose Garden contains over 8000 roses, including: Blue Moon, Bonica, Charles De-Gaulle, Double Delight, Fragrance, Freesia and Marlena. The middle of the garden displays thirteen bronze statues of Imelda Roche and her twelve grandchildren.
- Storybook Garden – The Storybook Garden contains many statues and murals of nursery rhyme characters including Ladybird Ladybird, Jack and Jill, Humpty Dumpty, Little Bo Peep and Alice in Wonderland.
- Sunken Garden – The Sunken Garden features a 10 metre high waterfall with a pergola on top as well as a display of evergreen and deciduous trees, shrubs, flowers and pathways surrounded with hundreds of roses.

=== Shopping Village ===
The shopping village is located outside the entrance to the gardens and is adjacent to the picnic area, barbecue, playground and the neighbouring Aqua Golf & Putt Putt course. The village contains a collection of bespoke shops, ranging from delicious meals to jewellery and unique clothing.

=== Accommodation/dining ===
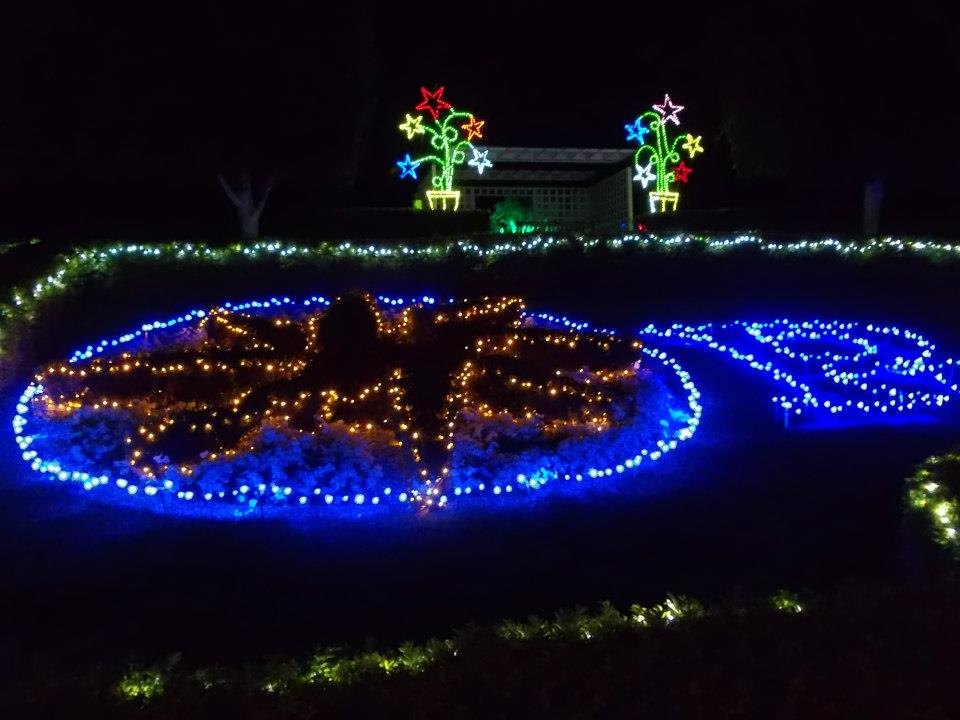
Christmas lights

There are two accommodation venues that Hunter Valley Gardens offers, Harrigan's Irish Pub & Accommodation and Mercure Resort Hunter Valley Gardens.

=== Weddings ===
Hunter Valley Gardens offers various settings for wedding ceremonies (including a purpose built chapel), photo opportunities and the assistance of a wedding consultant. There is a number of reception venues and many options for catering.

=== Events ===
Hunter Valley Gardens is known worldwide for the many yearly events that they hold. Along with these events, the gardens have horticultural talks, festivals and possess permanent Italian-imported rides.

Christmas Lights Spectacular – The Christmas Lights Spectacular is the largest lights display in the southern hemisphere with over 2 million lights, the event has been held every year since 2007. They begin at the start of November and close at the end of January.

Snow Time – Occurring in winter, the gardens open an ice skating rink, snow toboggan slides and other rides, that are accessible for most ages.

Mega Creatures – During the NSW school holidays, the Hunter Valley Gardens display many Mega Creature statues and animatronics throughout the gardens, including dinosaurs, insects and dragons.

== See also ==
- Mount Annan Botanical Gardens
- Mayfield Garden, another touristy garden in NSW
