= Michael Roach (disambiguation) =

Michael Roach may refer to:

- Michael Roach, (born 1952) American businessperson and teacher of Buddhism
- Michael Roach (musician) (born 1955), Piedmont Blues guitarist living in England
- Michael Roach (footballer) (born 1958), champion Australian rules footballer with the Richmond Football Club
- Michael Roach (soccer) (born 1988), American association football player
- Mickey Roach (1895–1977), American ice hockey player
- Mike Roach (1869–1916), baseball player

== See also ==
- Michael Roche (disambiguation)
