= Ladybird, Ladybird =

Nursery rhyme

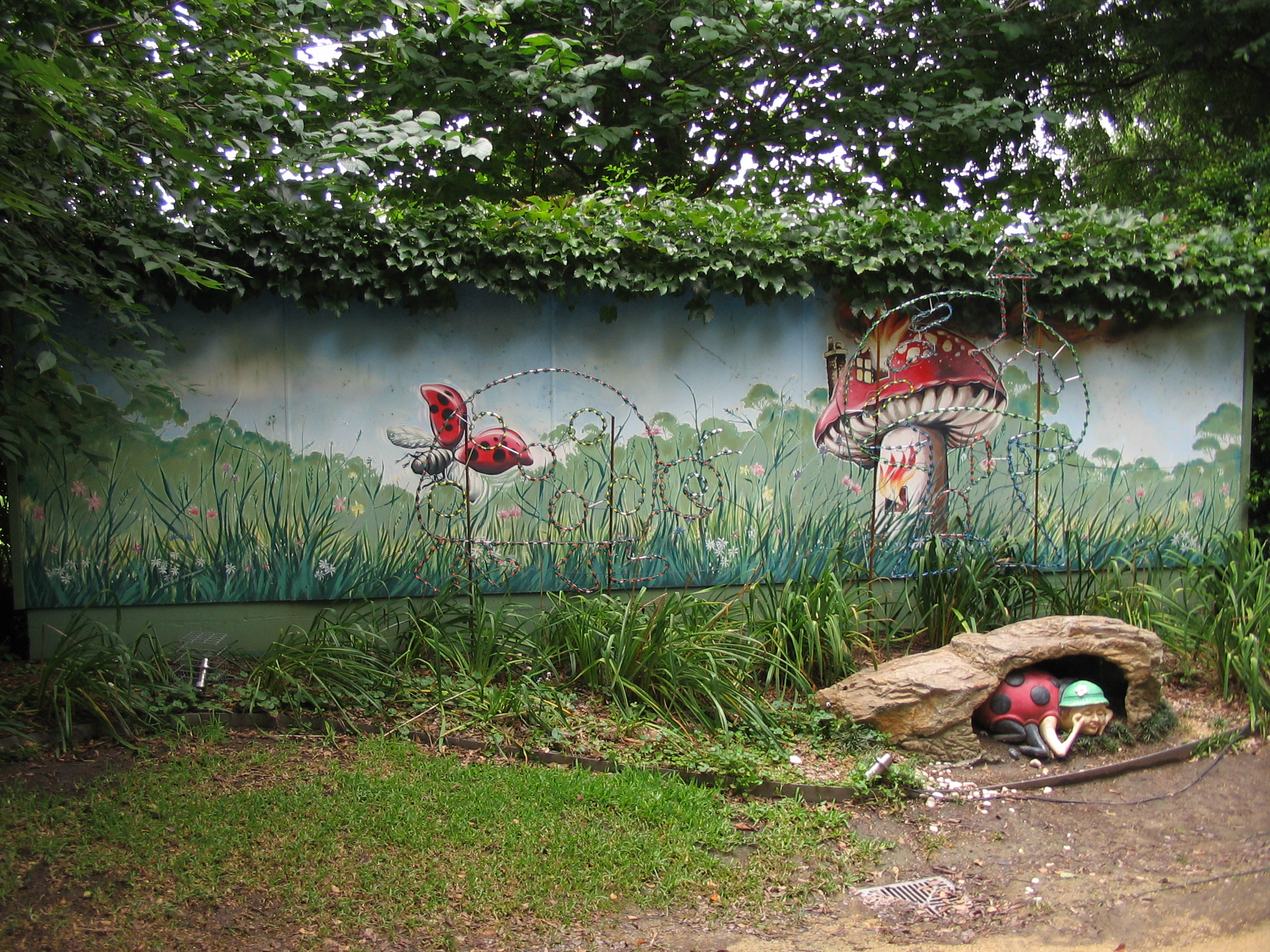
- Illustration of the rhyme in Hunter Valley Gardens, Australia

Nursery rhyme
- Published: c. 1744
- Songwriter: Unknown

"Ladybird, Ladybird" is the first line of an English-language nursery rhyme that has German analogues. It is number 16215 in the Roud Folk Song Index.

== The rhyme ==
This traditional verse relates to ladybirds, brightly coloured insects commonly viewed as lucky. The English version has been dated to at least 1744, when it appeared in Tommy Thumb's Pretty Songbook Vol. 2. The verse has several popular forms, including:

Ladybird, ladybird fly away home,
Your house is on fire and your children are gone,
All except one, and her name is Ann,
And she hid under the baking pan.

A shorter, grimmer version concludes:

Your house is on fire, your children shall burn!

The child who hides may also be named Nan, Anne and Little Anne and she has hidden under a "warming pan", "porridge pan", "frying pan" or even a "pudding pan". Alternatively, her name may be Aileen and her hiding place a "soup tureen". A widely varying Peterborough version makes the remaining child a boy:

Ladybird, ladybird, fly away home,
Your horse is on foot, your children are gone;
All but one, and that's little John,
And he lies under the grindle stone.

== Insect names ==
The insect goes by a variety of other names in British dialect rhymes. One Yorkshire version recorded in 1842 begins "Ladycow, Ladycow, ply thy way home", while Charlotte Brontë calls it a "lady-clock". In Scotland a rhyme from the same period is recorded as

Dowdy-cow, dowdy-cow, ride away heame,
Thy house is burnt, and thy bairns are tean.

American names include "ladybug", first recorded in 1699, although the equivalent rhyme is not mentioned until the 19th century, as in The Adventures of Tom Sawyer (1876). Also in the US, doodlebugs are substituted for ladybugs and are exhorted to "Come out of your hole".

The name ladybird contains a reference to Mary, mother of Jesus, often referred to as Our Lady, a convention that occurs in other European cultures where the insect is similarly addressed. In Germany it is the Marienkäfer, where a nursery rhyme runs "Marybug, fly away, your house is on fire, your wee mother weeps" (Marienkäferchen, fliege weg! Dein Häuschen brennt, Dein Mutterchen flennt). In a similar rhyme it is addressed as Himmelsküchlichen: "Sky-winger, fly away, your house is in flames, your children together in tears" (Deiner Kinder weinen alle miteinander). In Sweden the religious connection was maintained by calling the insect Jungfru Marias Nyckelpiga (Virgin Mary's keyholder), but with a slightly different rhyme.

== Adult's and children's lore ==
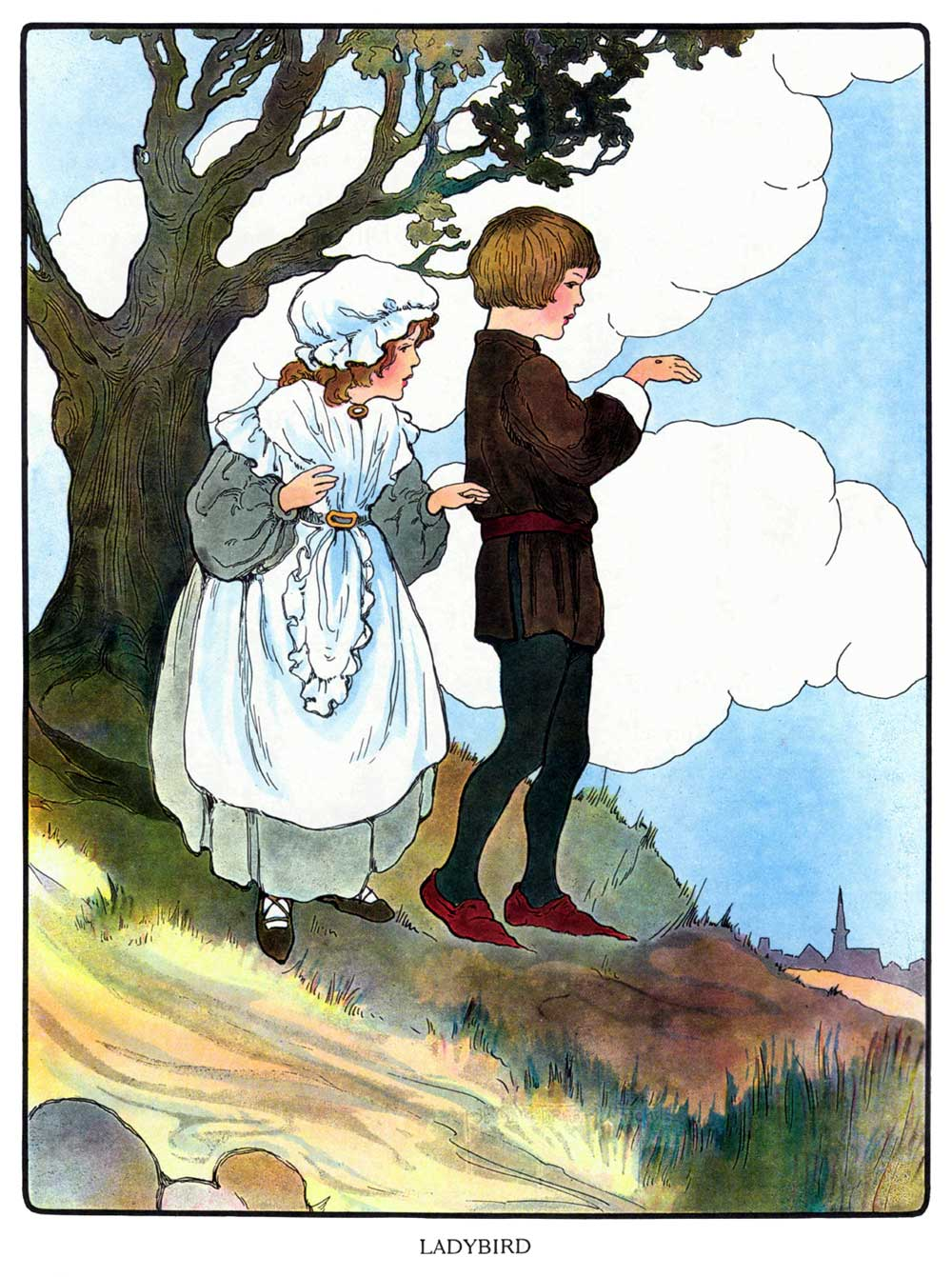
A 1916 illustration of Ladybird! Ladybird! by Blanche Fisher Wright

Because of the religious connotation of such names, one speculation would date the rhyme back to the 16th century and have it sung as a warning at a time when there was legislation against Catholics. Another connects it with a story that after prayers for help Our Lady brought the insect to destroy a plague of plant-destroying pests. According to other lore, farmers recite the rhyme to save the insects who do them this service before setting fire to stubble fields. Among children, it is common to place the ladybird on their hand or blow it from their clothing and make a wish while reciting the rhyme.

A literary variation on the rhyme was written by Caroline Anne Southey, published under the pseudonym "C." early in the 19th century. The nine-stanza poem appeared in an 1827 issue of Blackwood's Magazine. Titled "To The Lady Bird", the first stanza reads

Lady-bird, Lady-bird, fly away home,
The field mouse is gone to her nest,
The daisies have shut up their sleepy red eyes
And the birds and the bees are at rest

and continues with much the same formula and similar natural details for a further eight stanzas, at one point referencing the fairy myths of Oberon. To The Lady Bird, or excerpted stanzas from it, went on to appear in various publications through the next century and beyond. One stanza was also included at the head of an unpublished poem by Emily Brontë on a completely different subject.

== Bibliography ==
- I. Opie and P. Opie, The Oxford Dictionary of Nursery Rhymes (Oxford University Press, 2nd edn, 1997), pp. 308–310
