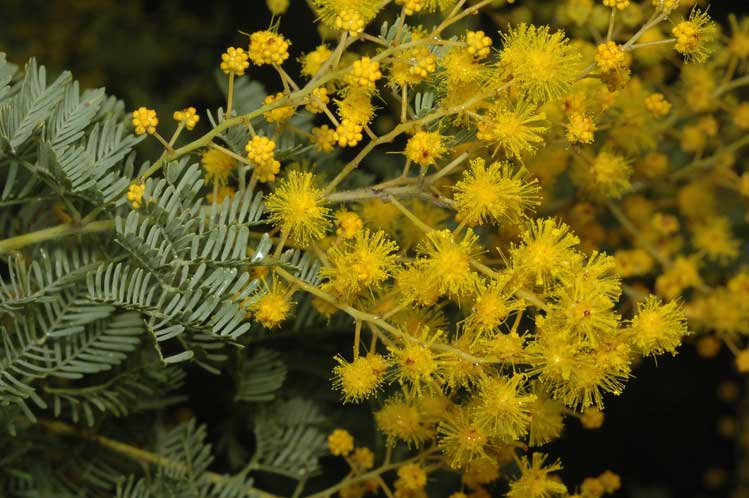
- In Mount Annan Botanic Garden

Scientific classification
- Kingdom: Plantae
- Clade: Tracheophytes
- Clade: Angiosperms
- Clade: Eudicots
- Clade: Rosids
- Order: Fabales
- Family: Fabaceae
- Subfamily: Caesalpinioideae
- Clade: Mimosoid clade
- Genus: Acacia
- Species: A. chinchillensis

Binomial name
- Acacia chinchillensis Tndale
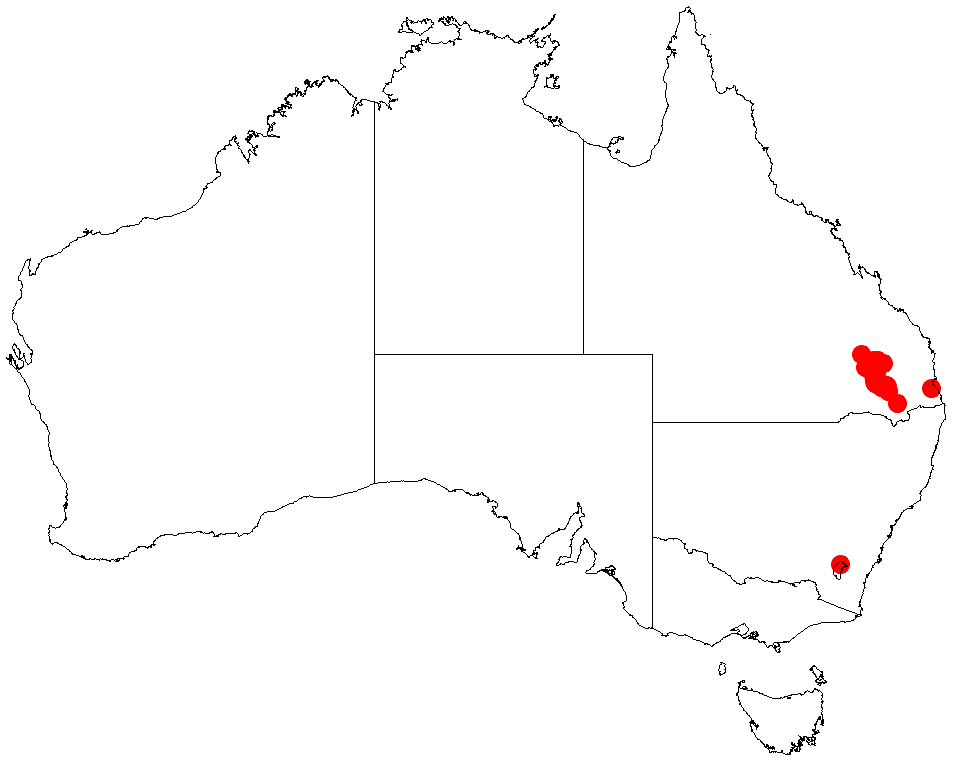
- Occurrence data from AVH

Synonyms
- Racosperma chinchillense (Tindale) Pedley

= Acacia chinchillensis =

Chinchilla wattle

Species of legume

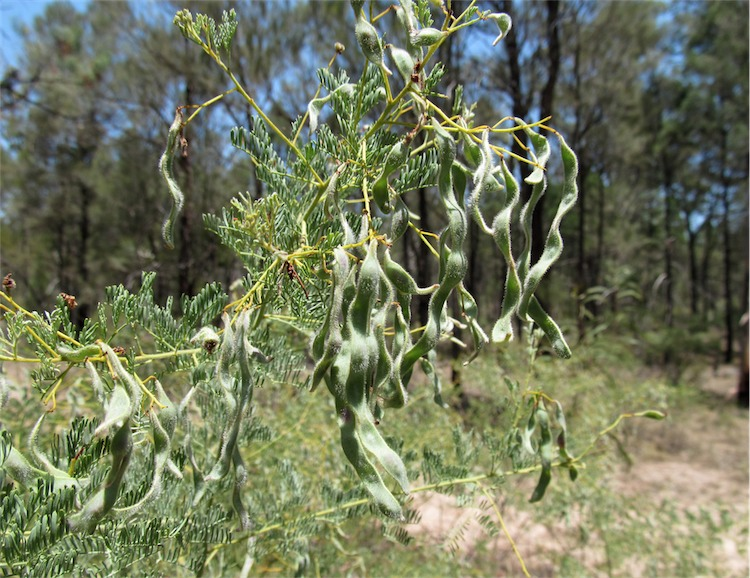
Pods

Acacia chinchillensis, commonly known as chinchilla wattle, is a species of flowering plant in the family Fabaceae and is endemic to Queensland, Australia. It is a multistemmed, glaucous shrub with bipinnate leaves with 2 to 4 pairs of pinnae, each with 5 to 11 pairs of pinnules. The flowers are borne in spherical heads of golden or yellow flowers, the pods are often curved, and thinly leathery and up to 100 mm (3.9 in) long.

== Description ==
Acacia chinchillensis is a multistemmed, glaucous shrub that typically grows to a height of 0.3–2 m (1 ft 0 in – 6 ft 7 in) and has smooth, grey to greenish brown bark. The leaves are bipinnate with 2 to 4 pairs of pinnae 0.8–1.5 mm (0.031–0.059 in) long, each with 5 to 11 lance-shaped pinnae 2–7 mm (0.079–0.276 in) long and 0.5–1 mm (0.020–0.039 in) wide with the narrower end towards the base. The petiole is 1–6 mm (0.039–0.236 in) long. The flowers are borne in spherical heads in axils on peduncles 2.5–5 mm (0.098–0.197 in) long, each head with 11 to 22 golden or yellow flowers. Flowering occurs from July to September, and the pods are thinly leathery, brownish-black, often curved, 40–100 mm (1.6–3.9 in) long and 4–7 mm (0.16–0.28 in) wide.

== Taxonomy ==
Acacia chinchillensis was first formally described in 1978 by the botanist Mary Tindale in the journal Telopea from specimens collected 36.7 km (22.8 mi) by road, north of Chinchilla. The specific epithet (chinchillensis) is derived from the name of the township, in which district this species is prevalent.

== Distribution ==
Chinchilla wattle ocurs from north of Chincilla to near Tara where it grows in ironbark (eg. Eucalyptus melanophloia) and Callitris columellaris - Casuarina woodland in sandy or gravelly soils.

== Conservation status ==
Acacia chinchillensis is listed as of "least concern" under the Queensland Government Nature Conservation Act 1992.

== See also ==
- List of Acacia species
