= David Roche =

David Roche may refer to:

- David Roche (footballer) (born 1970), English footballer
- David Roche (Medal of Honor), see List of Medal of Honor recipients for the Indian Wars
- David Roche (runner) (born 1988), American ultramarathon runner, coach, and podcaster
- Sir David Roche, 1st Baronet, member of the UK Parliament for Limerick City
- David John Roche (1918–1942), United States Navy officer awarded the Navy Cross
- Sir David O'Grady Roche, 5th Baronet (born 1947)
- Tiger Roche (David Roche, c. 1729–?), Irish soldier, duellist and adventurer

== See also ==
- David Roche Foundation in North Adelaide, Australia
