= Mayfield Garden =

Garden in New South Wales

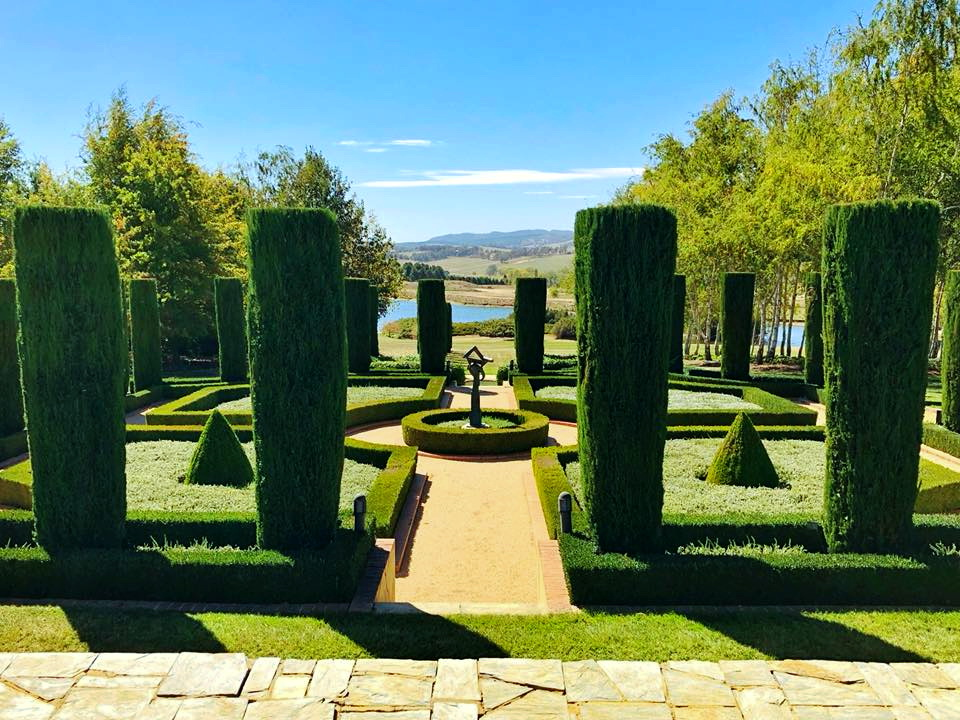
- Sculptured Thuja hedge

- Location within New South Wales Location within Australia
- Type: Cool Climate Garden
- Location: Oberon, New South Wales, Australia
- Coordinates: 33°39′58.13″S 149°46′45″E
- Area: 15 hectares (37 acres)
- Opened: 2014
- Operator: Alexandra and Christopher Muldoon
- Status: Open all year
- Website: mayfieldgarden.com.au

Mayfield Garden is a cool climate garden situated in Oberon in the Central Tablelands region of New South Wales, Australia. Located approximately 200 kilometres (120 mi) west of Sydney, the garden is one of the world's largest privately owned cool climate gardens, lying within a 2,000-hectare (5,000-acre) working farm. The garden is known as one of Australia's most significant horticultural destinations and has become a key element of the tourism industry in the Central West area of the state. Mayfield Garden is open daily with an entry fee, whilst the full private estate is also opened to the public for a short period during each season.

Developed by former investment banker Garrick Hawkins, Mayfield has been inspired by the gardens of Europe, which features vast greenery vistas, an avenue of trees, dazzling seasonal colours and ornamental flowering. It is made up of two main garden areas, Mayfield Garden (15 hectares) and the Hawkins' Family Private Estate (a further 50-hectares).

== History ==
The site was originally a sheep farm, with work commencing on the garden in 1984. Garrick Hawkins started readying a small personal garden at this time in an association with local nurseryman and landscaper Peter D'Arcy. Three-decades later it has evolved into one of the largest and most significant private gardens in Australia, enhanced by the addition of hospitality and other tourism infrastructure. Agricultural activities still occur on the 2,025 hectares (5,000 acres) of land that encircles the garden.

== Collections ==
=== Mayfield ===
Mayfield Garden encompasses 15 hectares of the overall estate, including the Water Garden which is 2.5 hectares (6.2 acres) in size, displaying a canopy layer of red oaks and copper beech that are matched by a preponderant mid-layer of gaudy rhododendrons and maples, with hellebore and alchemilla ground covers and an ostentatious display of spring and summer flowering bulbs. There is a prominent stone cascade that was designed after the sandstone cliffs of proximate Kanangra Walls. There is a large collection maples, possibly the largest in Australia, which go with a collection of Hydrangeas and the flashy water lilies, which bloom in the summer.

Shaped like a valley, the Valley of the Five Ponds contains woodland collection of deciduous oaks, maples, birch and beech, with a shrub groundcover of viburnum, Rhododendron molle and cornus, and winter-flowering Hellebore and summer-flowering heuchera. Other spring blossoms include; tulip, daffodil, fritillaria, crocus, grape hyacinth and allium. The region also contains a summer-blooming meadow wildflowers and hostas. A stone water trough weaves through the valley and links the five ponds. There is also an avenue of London plane trees, a 12.5-metre Obelisk Pond, a Grotto, Bluestone Bridge, Copper Tree Fountain and Sandstone gallery.

=== Family garden ===
The Hawkins' Family Garden is the private garden portion of the estate, which is an additional 50 hectares (120 acres) beyond Mayfield Garden. It features the second largest maze of its kind in Australia and plant species such as dahlias, zinnias, poppies, delphiniums, lilies, hollyhocks and lupins. The area also includes an introduced pine forest with an understory of rhododendrons and ferns, a chicken coop, a rose garden with David C.H. Austin roses and hybrid tea, wisteria, climbing hydrangea, columnar juniper. The heath gardens include Erica and Calluna species. The lake and boardwalk garden beds are aggregated with many types of Rhododendron and Mollis Azaleas. Other elements of the private family estate which can be seen only during seasonal festivals include the Family Chapel, 70-metre Water Cascade, Kitchen Garden, Stumpery and all lakes and water features.

== Facilities ==
The garden contains a café and produce store, where most food and items are either sourced onsite or from local suppliers. The private family garden is open seasonally, with a festival atmosphere highlighted by music, an expanded food offering and various recreational activities, such as rowing on Mayfield Lake and trekking in the garden's maze. Wedding photography and other forms of professional photography are allowed in the garden with fees applying. Dogs are also welcome in the garden, provided they remain on a leash.

== Gallery ==
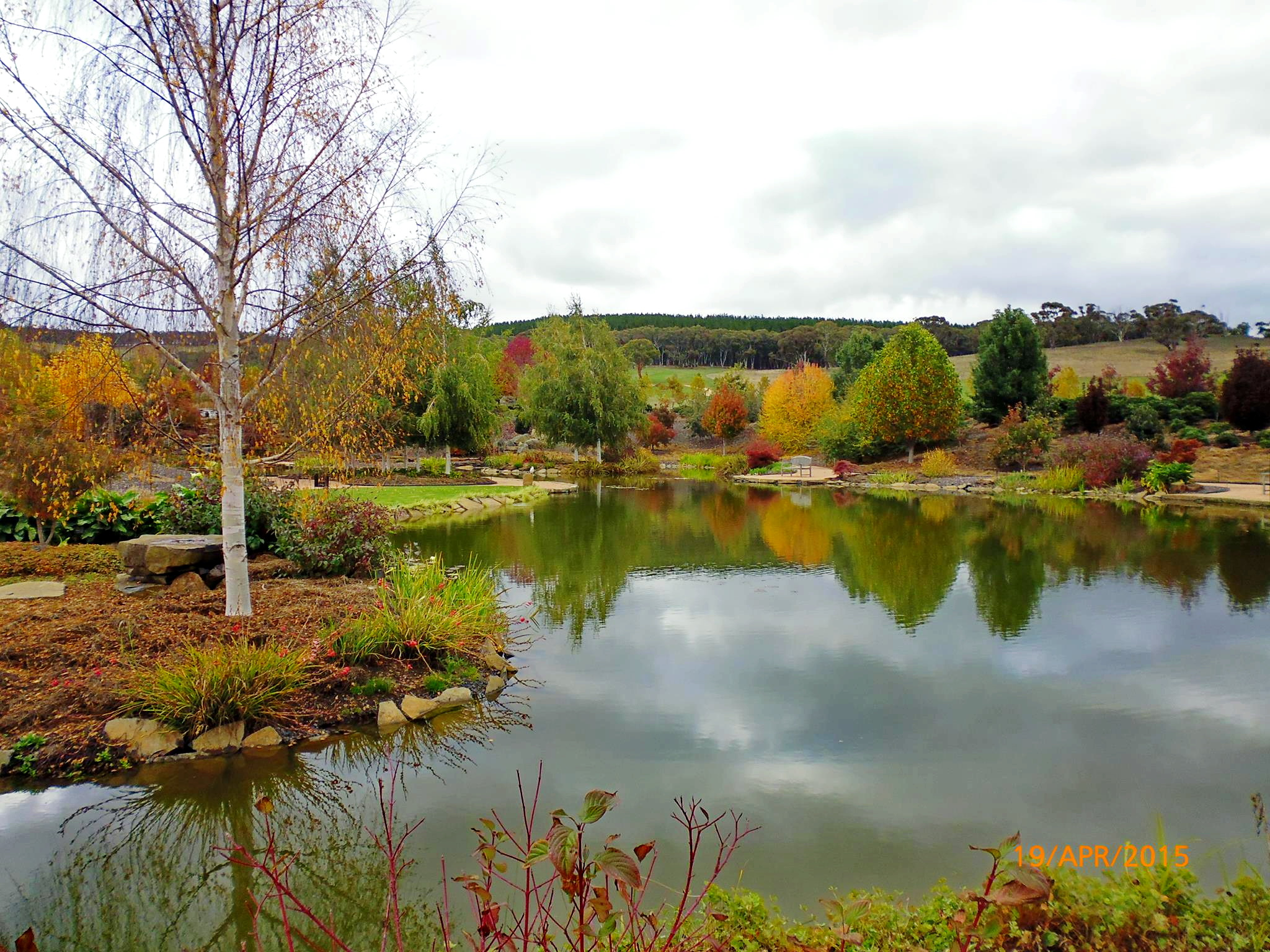
The ornamental landscape

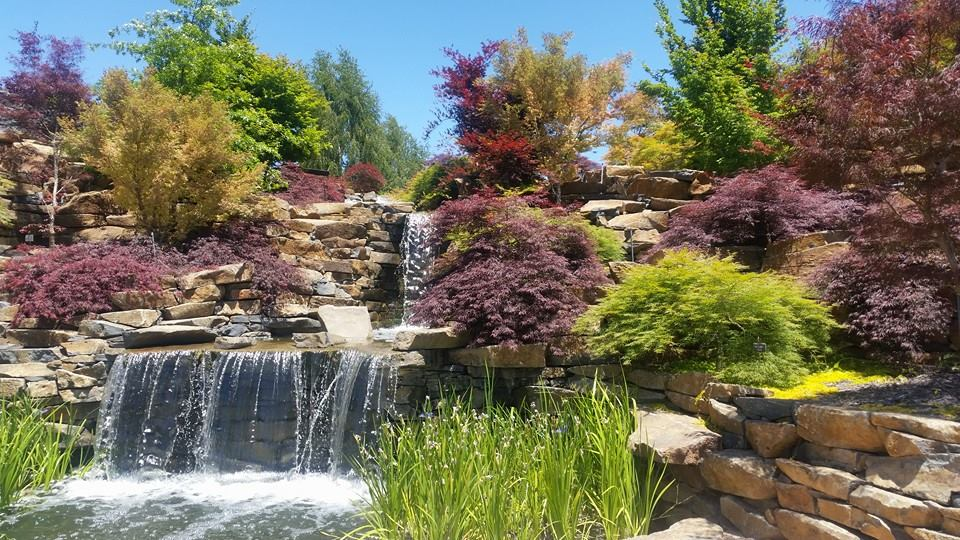
A small waterfall within the flowery vista

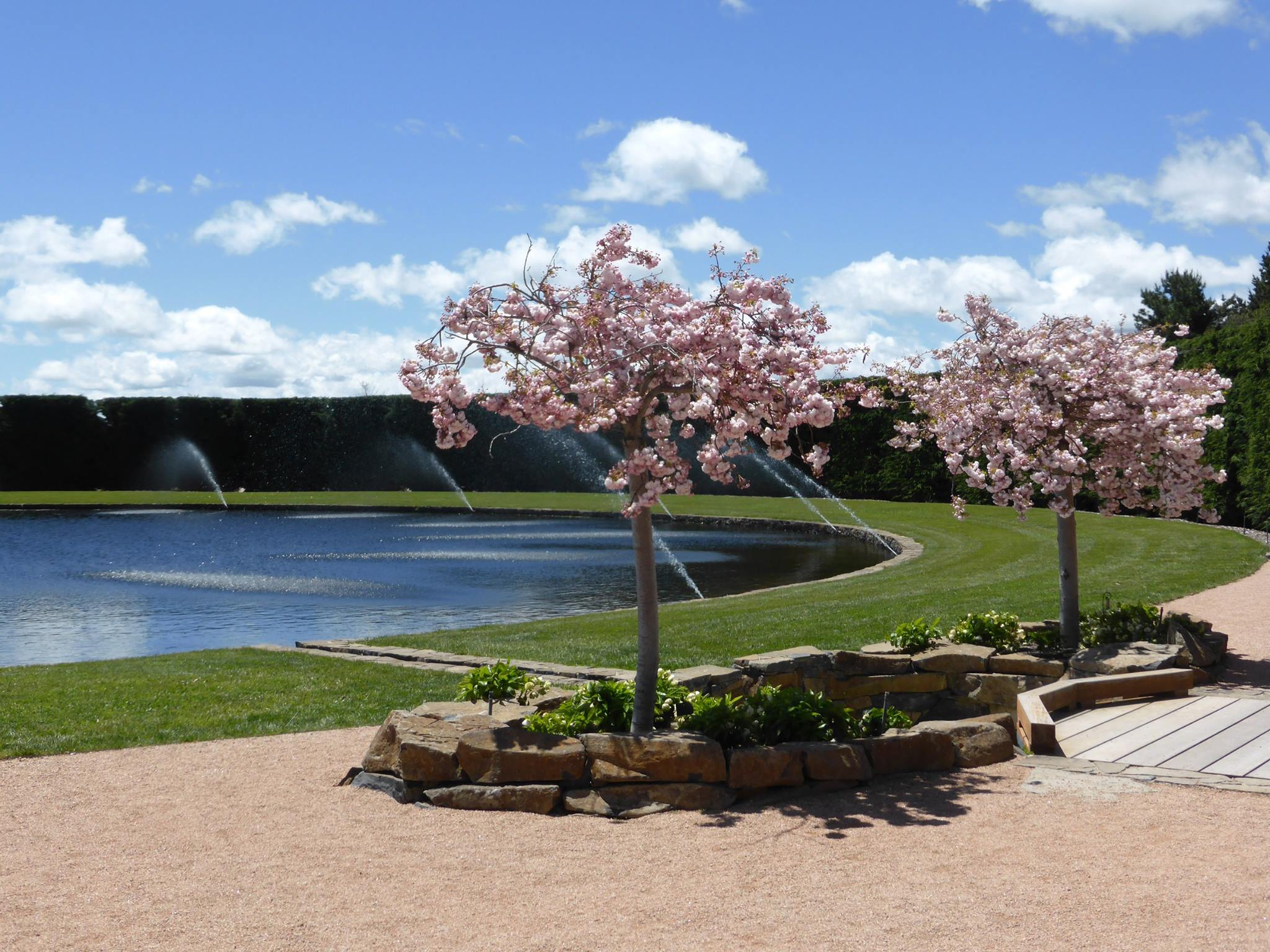
Ornamental trees

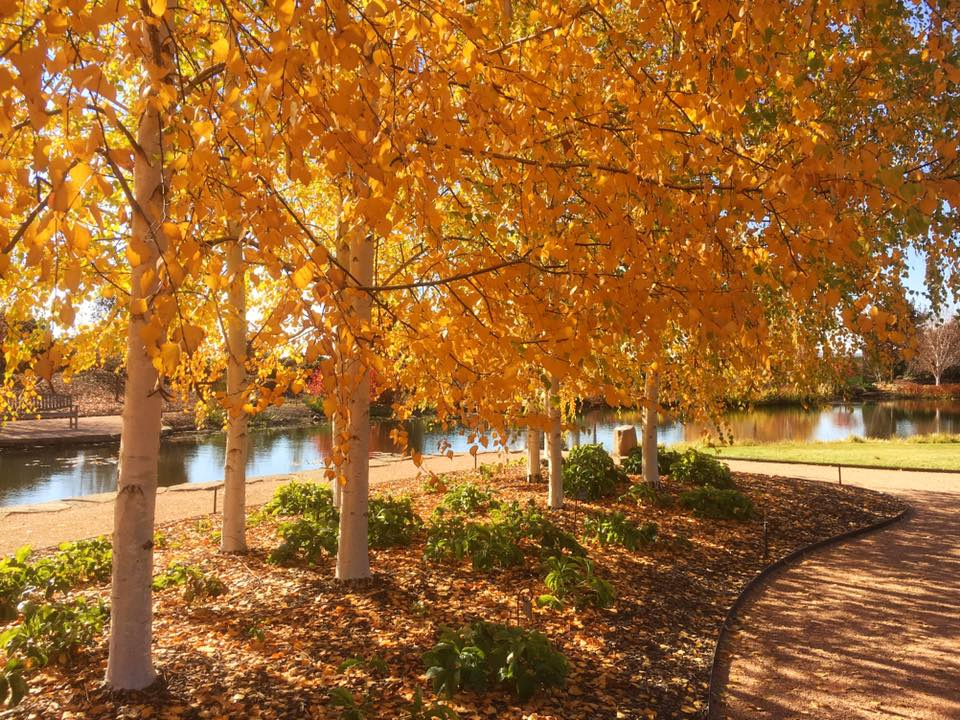
London plane trees

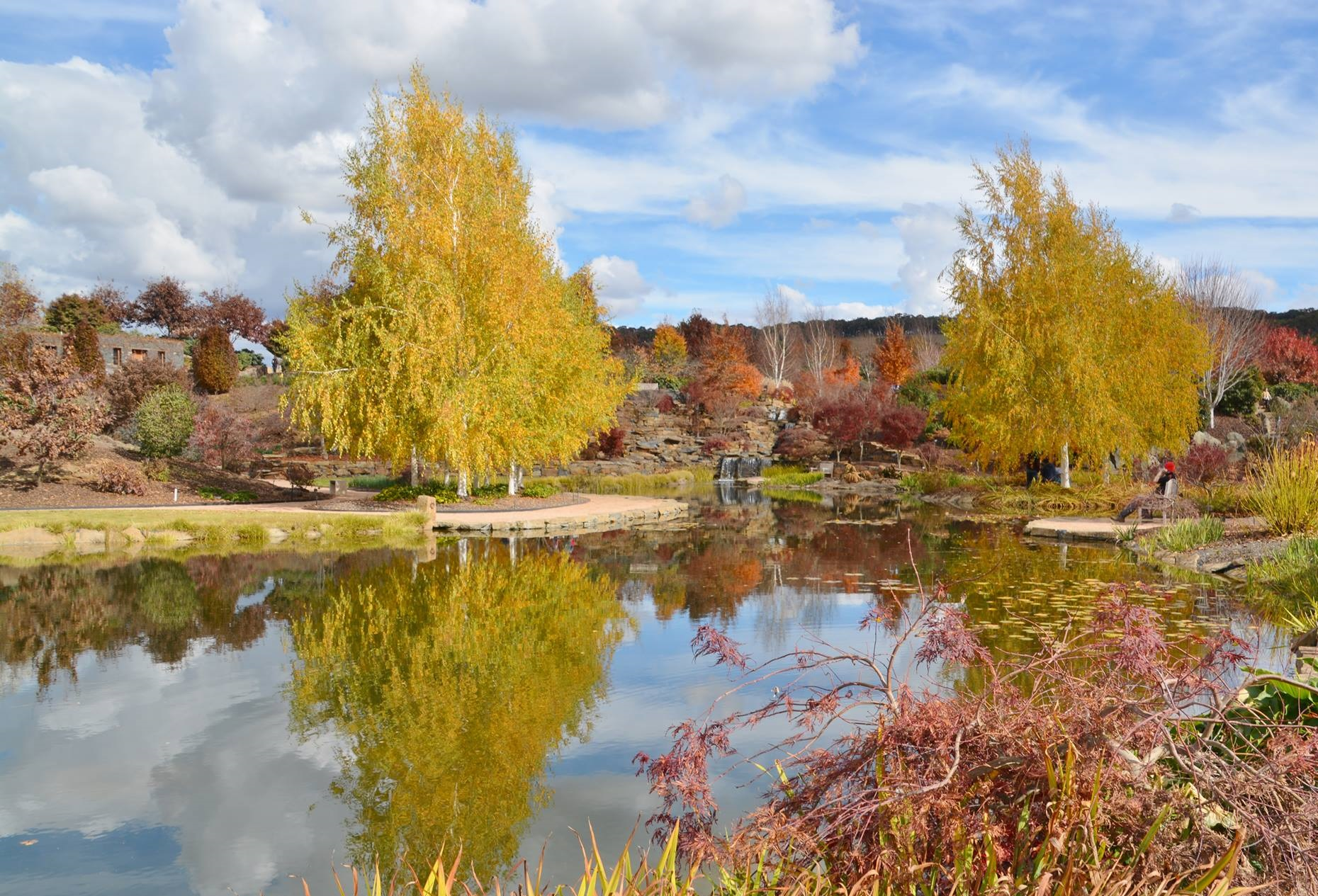
Colourful deciduous plant scenery

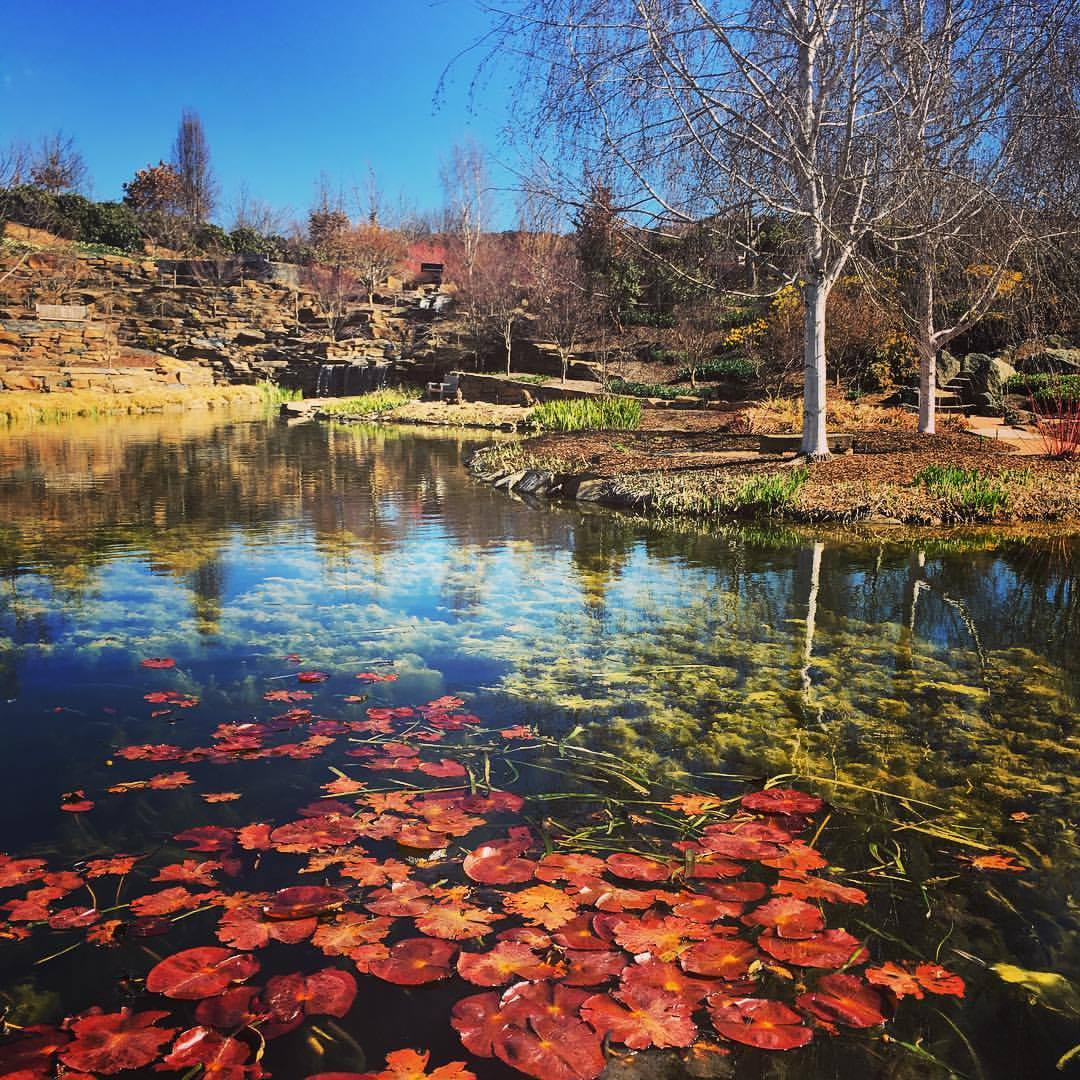
A dazzling lily pond

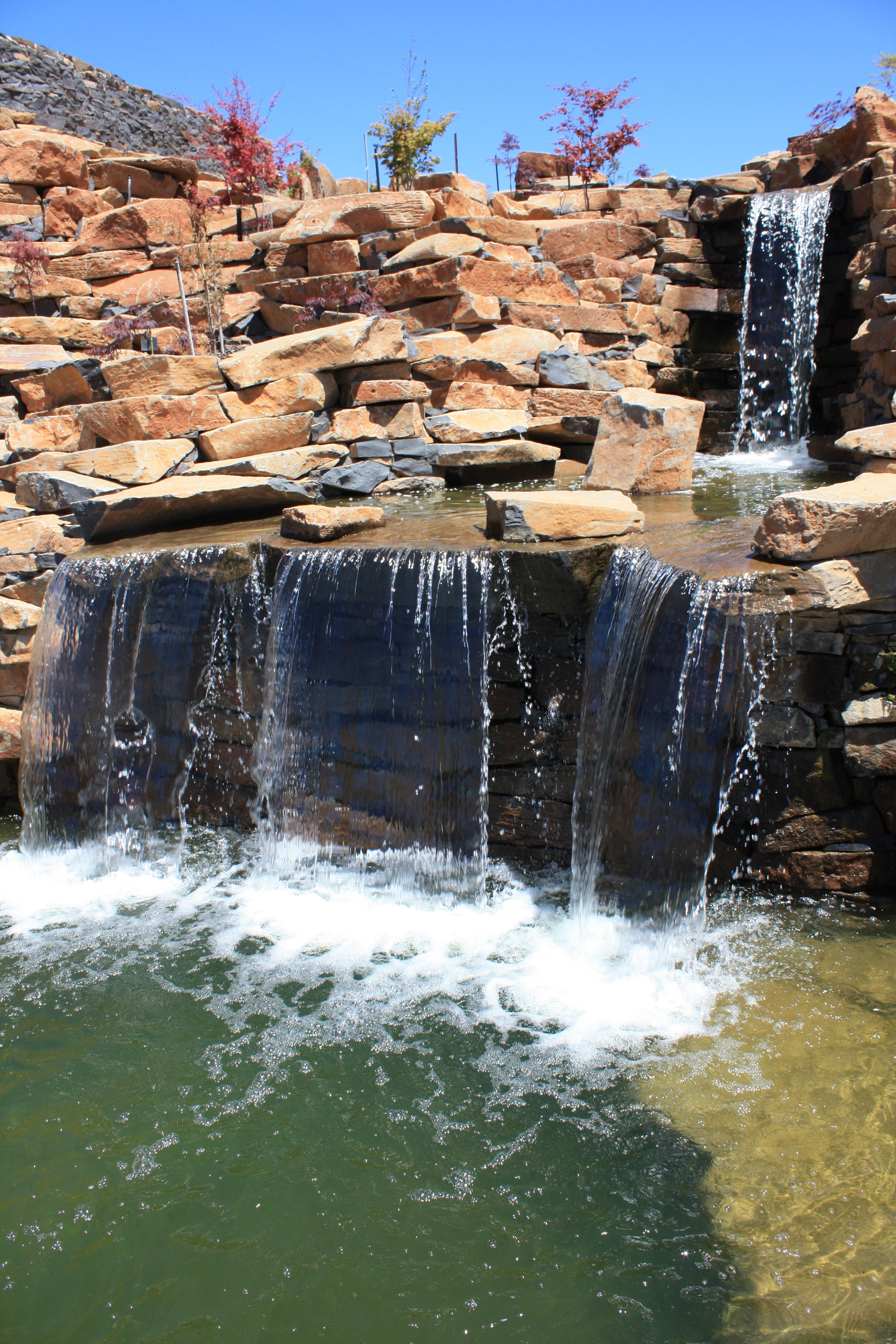
The Grotto (cascading waterfall)

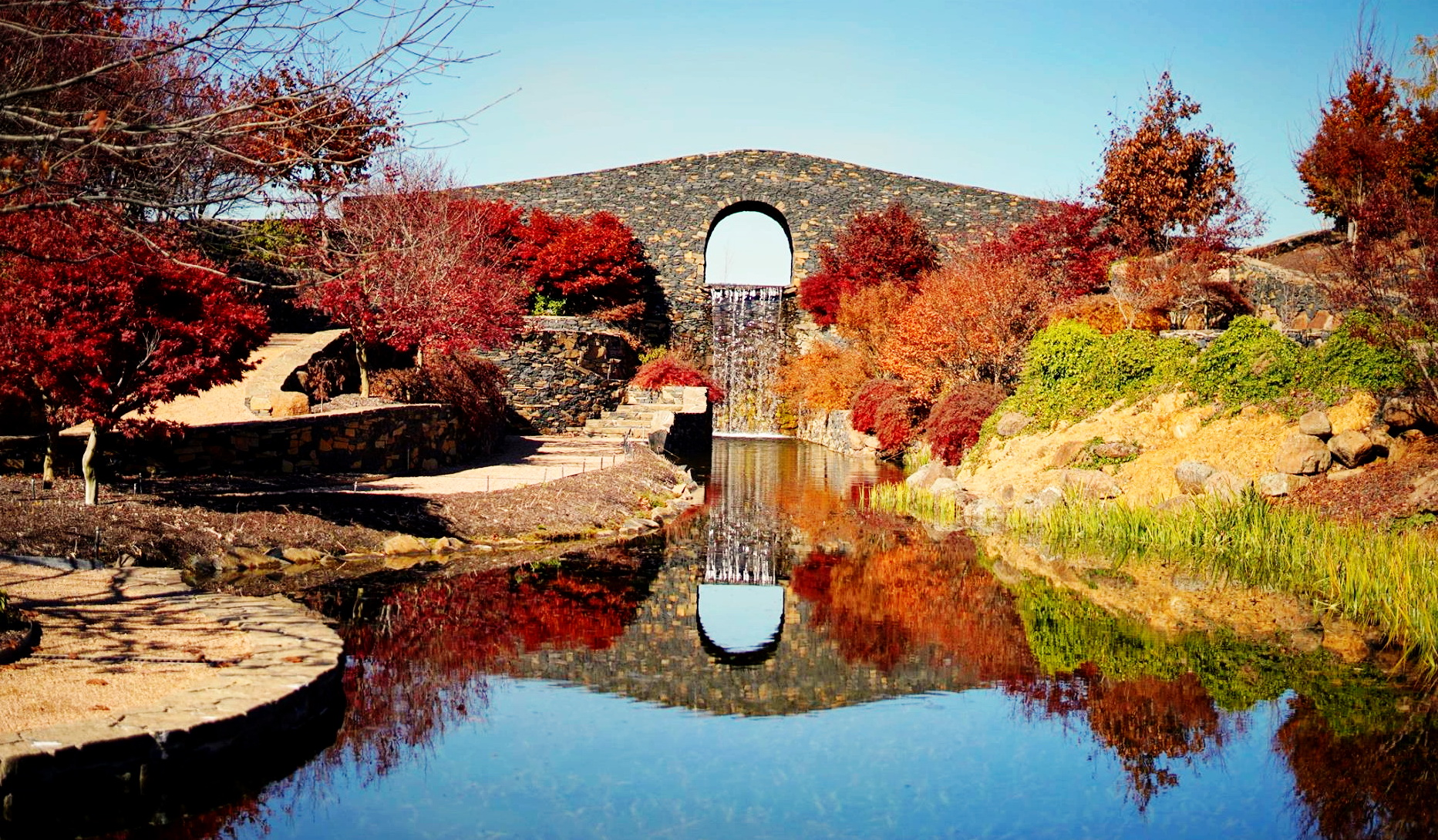
The bluestone bridge waterfall

== See also ==
- Cowra Japanese Garden and Cultural Centre
- Burrendong Botanic Garden and Arboretum
- Mount Annan Botanical Gardens
- Hunter Valley Gardens
