= William Roach =

William Roach may refer to:

- William N. Roach (1840–1902), United States Senator from North Dakota
- William Henry Roach (1784–1861), merchant and politician in Nova Scotia
- Bill Roach (footballer) (1925–2016), Australian rules footballer
- William Roach (cricketer) (1914–1944), Australian cricketer

== See also ==
- William Roache (born 1932), English television actor
- William James Roache (born 1985), his son and fellow actor
