= Frank Roche =

American writer and businessman (born 1959)

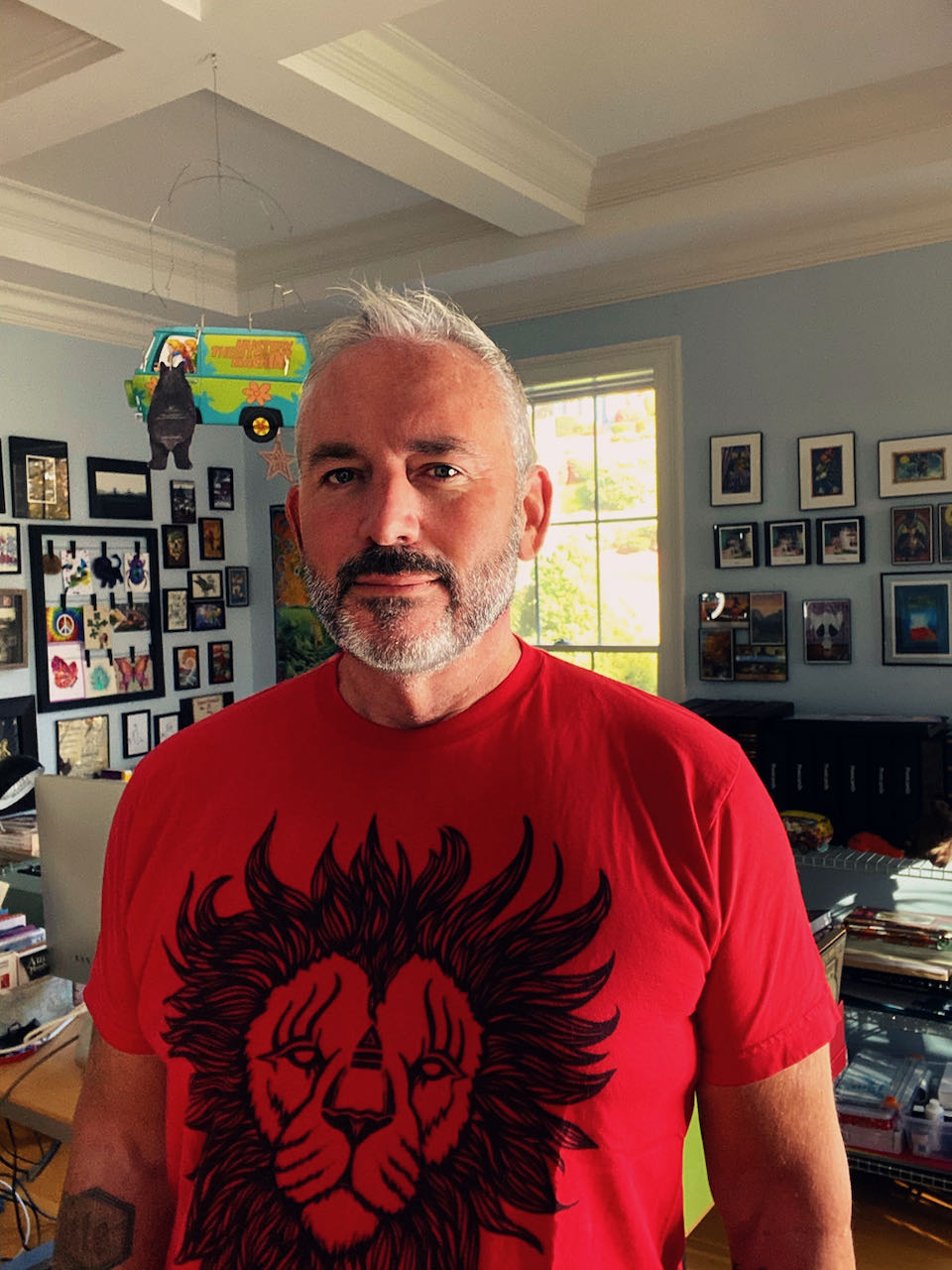
- Born: July 11, 1959 (age 67); Cleveland, Ohio, U.S.
- Occupation: Writer

Frank Roche (born July 11, 1959) is an American writer and businessman. He is the author of the book Know HR, owner of iFractal LCC, and a regularly featured speaker on HR matters. He presented at WorldatWork's national conference on "HR Consulting or Corporate: Which is the Right Choice for You?" He was named One of the Top 25 HR Influencers by HR World Magazine. He is also the author and host of The Adventures of PanCan Man, a resource for patients and caregivers who, like him, have been affected by pancreatic cancer.

== Awards and publications ==
He has won several Gold Quill Awards of Merit from IABC, the ACE Grand Award and Award of Excellence and the APEX grand Award.
