= Michael Roche =

Michael Roche may refer to:

- Michael Joseph Roche (1878–1964), U.S. federal judge
- Michael Augustine Roche (1849–1915), Irish politician
- Mick Roche (1943–2016), Irish hurler
- Michael Roche (boxer) (born 1971), Irish boxer

== See also ==
- Michael Roach (disambiguation)
- Michel Roche (1939–2004), French equestrian
- Mike Roche (fl. 2000s–2020s), American actor
- Mike Roche (runner) (born 1953), American middle-distance runner
