= Tiger Roche =

Irish soldier, duellist, and adventurer

David "Tiger" Roche
- Born: c. 1729; Dublin, Ireland
- Occupation(s): Soldier, idler, duelist, possible murderer
- Spouse: Miss Pitt (divorced)

David "Tiger" Roche, (born c. 1729) was an Irish soldier, duellist and adventurer, variously hailed as a hero and damned as a thief and a murderer at many times during his stormy life. Roche was born to a middle-class family in Dublin in 1729 and received a gentleman's education, he was in fact so well turned out that his comportment sufficiently impressed the Lord Lieutenant of Ireland to offer him a military commission at sixteen years' old. Roche had fallen in with bad company and was possibly involved in an attack on a night watchman, one of many carried out by gangs of bucks at the time. He fled to North America, where he volunteered during the French and Indian War. There his bravery and intrepidity impressed and he quickly rose to a high rank; until accused of theft from a fellow officer. Roche always denied the allegation, stating he had bought the gun in question, but according to the corporal from whom he claimed to have done so, Roche himself had stolen it. Roche was convicted and disgraced by court martial. Roche later attacked several people involved in the case, including the corporal, after which he earned the nickname "Tiger".

He continued to fight with distinction in the war, and then with money from friends in Ireland, sailed for England where he hoped to buy a commission in the army. However the stain of his conviction followed him, and the other officers refused to serve with him, until the dying corporal confessed that he had in fact stolen the gun. Roche was vindicated overnight and returned to Dublin a hero, where he was offered a lieutenancy in a new regiment. His status was further boosted after he raised a unit to patrol the streets at night against a particularly vicious brand of criminals active at the time. After the Treaty of Paris in 1763 Roche was forced to retire from the army and move to London, where he married the wealthy Miss Pitt, but later squandered her money and she divorced him. Roche ended the affair in debtors' prison, until his own inheritance freed him. Roche idled along in London until friends asked him to stand for Parliament, though he declined the offer. In 1773, though, he accepted a captaincy in an infantry regiment and sailed for India. There were disagreements aboard the ship and Roche fell out with the captain and other gentlemen aboard. When they landed at the Cape of Good Hope Roche called on Captain Ferguson's house, who was later found dead behind it. Roche fled, but was caught, tried and acquitted by the Dutch. He continued to Bombay, where the British arrested him; he opposed the legal grounds of his trial, but he was returned to London to stand trial in the Old Bailey in December 1774. He was again acquitted. The case is the last trace Roche left.

He appeared as the hero in a play by John Masefield and may have been the model for William Makepeace Thackeray's Barry Lyndon.

== Early life ==
David Roche was born, either the first or second of three sons, to Jordan Roche and Ellen White in Dublin, Ireland in 1729. His younger brother was Sir Boyle Roche, the eminent politician.

Roche received the best education Dublin could provide, and was instructed in all the accomplishments then deemed essential to the rank and character of a gentleman. So expert was he in the various acquirements of polite life, that at the age of 16 he recommended himself to Philip Stanhope, 4th Earl of Chesterfield, then Lord Lieutenant of Ireland, who offered him, gratuitously, a commission in the army. However, Roche had fallen in with a disreputable crowd who convinced him to refuse Chesterfield's offer. Further, Roche was present (and probably directly involved) when his associates attacked and killed a watchman. Compelled to leave Dublin, Roche made his way to Cork, and from there to North America. At the outbreak of the French and Indian War, Roche entered as a volunteer in one of the provincial regiments, and distinguished himself in skirmishes against the Indians.

== Court Martial ==
Roche displayed intrepidity and spirit in his military doings, and was expected to rise to a high rank until an unfortunate event destroyed his career. An officer of Roche's regiment missed a valuable gun, which was later found in Roche's possession. Roche declared that he had bought the gun from a corporal of the regiment named Bourke. Bourke declared on oath that Roche's statement was false, and Roche was brought to a court-martial. Roche was convicted of the theft and ordered to quit the service with "every mark of disgrace and ignominy".

Roche subsequently challenged and attacked a number of the people involved in the incident, including Corporal Bourke. During his fight with Bourke, Roche sank his teeth into Bourke's throat and was pulled away dragging a mouthful of flesh (which he afterwards said was "the sweetest morsel he had ever tasted"). It was from this fight that he gained the nickname "Tiger".

After this incident, Roche fought as a volunteer in other battles, possibly including the first battle at Fort Ticonderoga. Though he fought well, Roche was not able to escape the stain of the robbery. He made his way to New York and eventually, in 1758, received some money from friends in Ireland and was able to obtain passage on a vessel bound for England. Roche reserved part of his supply of money for the purchase of a regimental commission. Just as the purchase was about to be completed, a report of his theft in America reached the regiment, and the officers refused to serve with him.

Roche traced the origin of the report to a Captain Campbell, whom he met and challenged to a duel. Both men were desperately wounded. On other occasions Roche challenged or attacked others connected with the incident, and generally anyone who spread the story. Roche's attacks, though fierce, were not usually successful, and he was seriously wounded on several occasions. Ultimately, redress to his character came accidentally and unexpectedly. Corporal Bourke was mortally wounded by a scalping party of Indians, and on his death-bed made a solemn confession that he himself had actually stolen the gun, and sold it to Roche, and that Roche had purchased it without any suspicion of the theft. This declaration of the dying man was properly attested and universally accepted, and instantly restored Roche's character.

== A hero in Dublin ==
In compensation for the injustice and injury he had suffered, Roche was awarded a lieutenancy in a newly raised regiment. He returned to Dublin (where the old murder charge had been quietly dropped) a much-celebrated hero.

Dublin was at this time infested with criminals known as sweaters or pinkindindies (who cut off the points of their swords because they would rather "inflict considerable pain" than kill). One evening Roche happened to single-handedly rescue an old gentleman with his son and daughter from a gang of several such attackers. This gave him the idea to form a body, consisting of officers and others of his acquaintance, to patrol Dublin at night, further enhancing his heroic status.

== Fall and rise in London ==
The peace concluded in 1763 reduced the size of the army, and forced Roche to retire in indigent circumstances to London, where he soon lived beyond his income. In order to repair it, he managed to marry a Miss Pitt, who had a fortune of £4,000 (approximately £100,000 in today's money). On the anticipation of this fortune, Roche engaged in a series of extravagances that accumulated debts beyond his marriage portion. He was arrested and cast into the King's Bench Prison, where his wife divorced him and where so many detainers were laid upon him so that it seemed unlikely that he would ever go free. However, a legacy left him by a relation enabled him to escape confinement.

Roche became a constant frequenter of billiard-tables. One day he was idly pushing balls around a table, and someone complained that while he was not playing himself, he was "hindering other gentlemen from their amusement." Roche replied, "why, sir, except you and me, and two or three more, there is not a gentleman in the room." A friend afterwards remarked that he had grossly offended a large company, and wondered why none had appeared to resent the affront. "Oh!" said Roche, "there was no fear of that. There was not a thief in the room that did not consider himself one of the two or three gentlemen I excepted."

Once again Roche's fortunes improved, and he was called on to stand as candidate to represent Middlesex in Parliament. So high an opinion was entertained of his daring spirit, that it was thought by some of the popular party he might be of use in intimidating Colonel Luttrell, who was the declared opponent of John Wilkes at that election. In April 1769, he was put into nomination at Brentford. Roche disappointed his friends and declined the poll, induced, it was said, by promises of Luttrell's friends to provide for him.

Roche's stay in London included at least one duel, and also an attack by two ruffians with pistols in which Roche, armed only with a sword, nevertheless prevailed. Less savoury stories of Roche's attachment, mismanagement and eventual dissipation of a young woman's fortune also survive from this period.

== A murder in Africa ==
Roche was appointed captain of a company of foot soldiers in the East India Service, and embarked in the Vansittart for India in May 1773. Apparently Roche was in such a temper that he fell out with all the passengers, including a Captain Ferguson, who called him out as soon as they arrived at Madeira. Roche was seized with a sudden and unaccountable fit of terror, and refused to fight. The early arrogance and later cowardice he had displayed revolted the whole body of the passengers, and the captain of the ship expelled him from the table, leaving Roche to join the common sailors and soldiers on board the ship. With these he endeavoured to ingratiate himself by claiming vengeance against every gentleman and officer on board the ship. His threats were particularly directed against Ferguson, whom he considered the origin of the disgrace he suffered.

On the arrival of the ship at the Cape of Good Hope, Roche came ashore and was seen near the house where Ferguson lodged. A message was conveyed to Ferguson, who went out, and was found soon afterwards behind the house with nine deep wounds, all on his left side. Suspicion immediately fixed on Roche as the murderer and he fled during the night, taking refuge among the Kaffirs.

Roche was tried by the Dutch authorities at the Cape of Good Hope, and acquitted. He then took a passage in a French vessel to Bombay, but the Vansittart had arrived in India before him. Information had been given to the British authorities, charging Roche with Ferguson's murder, and Roche was arrested as soon as he landed. He asked to be discharged, or at least bailed, on the grounds that there was not sufficient evidence against him and that he had been already acquitted. He also argued that as the offence, if any, had been committed outside British dominions, he could only be tried by special commission, and it was uncertain whether the Crown would issue one or not, or when or where it would sit. He argued his own case with the skill of a practised lawyer. The authorities, however, declined either to bail or discharge him, and he was kept in custody until he was sent a prisoner to England, to stand his trial.

A charge of murder was brought against him, and a commission was issued to try it. The case came on at the Old Bailey, in London, before Baron Burland, on 11 December 1774. Roche's counsel declined to rely on the former acquittal at the Cape of Good Hope, and the case was again gone through. The fact of the killing was undisputed, but from the peculiar nature of the proceedings, there could not be, as in a common indictment for murder, a conviction for manslaughter; and the judge directed the jury, if they did not believe the killing to be malicious and deliberate, absolutely to acquit the prisoner. The jury brought in a verdict of acquittal.

== Mysterious end ==
It is not known what happened to Roche next, or where and when his life ended. Somerville-Large claims he returned to India, and lived quietly until his death.

== Further bibliography ==
- The trials of Tiger Roche: Sequels to the killing of Captain Ferguson in Van Plettenbergs Cape Town, Randolph Vigne.

== Related literary works ==
- The Sweeps of '98 (play), by John Masefield
- The Luck of Barry Lyndon (novel), by William Makepeace Thackeray
- "The Spanish Lady" (Irish folksong, similar to and possibly a basis for or a version of "Whiskey in the Jar")
