= Imelda Roche =

Australian property developer

Imelda Roche AO
- Born: c. 1935 (age 90–91)
- Occupations: Entrepreneur; property investor
- Known for: Co-Founder of Nutrimetics in Australia
- Children: 4

Bill Roche
- Born: William Roche c. 1935
- Died: 30 June 2022

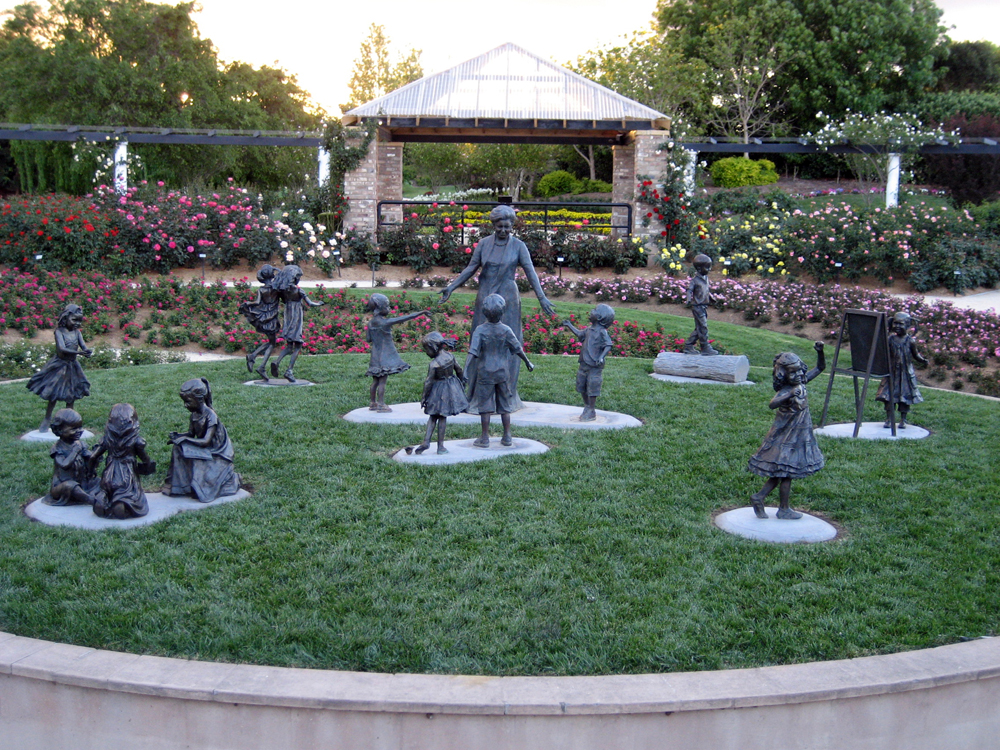
Imelda Roche & grandchildren, life-size bronze sculpture, centre of rose garden in Hunter Valley Gardens by Linda Klarfeld

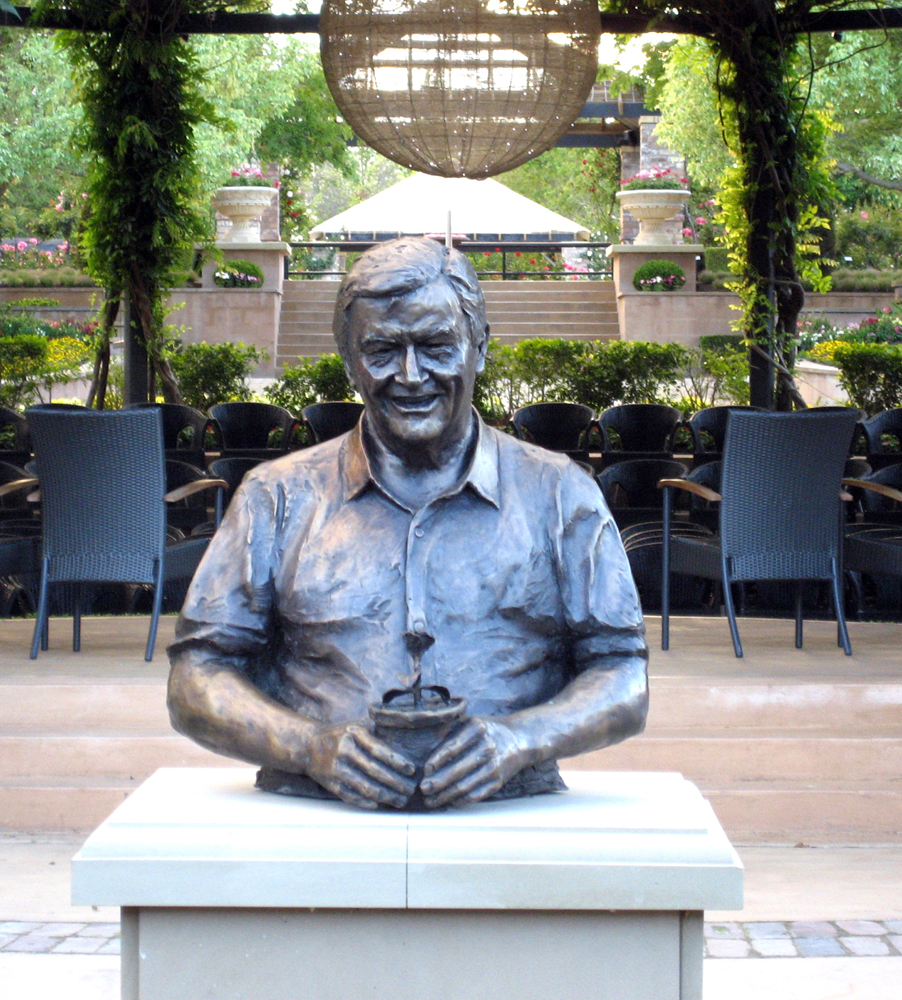
Life-size bronze statue of Bill Roche outside Hunter Valley Gardens by Linda Klarfeld

Imelda Joan Roche AO (born c. 1935) is an Australian entrepreneur and property investor who established Nutrimetics International (Australia) Pty Limited in 1968 with her husband, Bill Roche (c. 1935 – 30 June 2022). They then founded a property development company, the Roche Group.

== Career ==
Imelda and Bill Roche met in a supermarket in 1956 and started in business selling lamps door-to-door.

In 1968 the couple bought the Australian franchise to Nutrimetics, starting with A$6,000 of stock. In 1991, they acquired the worldwide interests of Nutrimetics International. The Nutrimetics Group was sold in 1997 to the Sara Lee Corporation. At the time of sale the company had a turnover of A$250 million a year.

The couple expanded into property development and investment. They started their real estate investments with the purchase of a Sydney warehouse in the late 1950s. They subsequently owned residential land subdivisions, rural properties and office complexes. The Roche Group Pty Ltd was registered in 2000. The company owns several Hunter Valley landmarks, including the award-winning Hunter Valley Gardens, the live concert venue Roche Estate and Harrigan's Irish Pub. In 2020 there was controversy around a Roche Group housing development planned at West Wallsend. For almost ten years, activists were fighting to protect an Aboriginal women's site situated on land slated for development. Despite both the NSW Government and the Australian Government recognising the site's significance via legislation, the Roche Group appeared to push ahead with plans that could see the Butterfly Cave women's cultural site desecrated or damaged.

Bill Roche died on 30 June 2022, aged 87 years.

== Personal life ==
From 1990 to 1992, Roche served as president of Chief Executive Women. In 1993 she was appointed chair of the World Federation of Direct Selling Associations, which represented 50 national associations and 1500 member companies, the first woman and the first Australian in this role.

In April 1994 Roche was appointed by Prime Minister Paul Keating as Australian representative to the Pacific Business Forum of APEC (Asia-Pacific Economic Co-operation), and in 1996 was appointed to the same role in John Howard's successor organisation, the Business Advisory Council to APEC.

Roche was acting chancellor of Bond University from 5 August 1999 to 25 November 1999, and served as chancellor from 25 November 1999 to 30 May 2003.

In March 1999 she was appointed chair of the New South Wales Chapter of Family Business Australia, and in June 2001 became a patron of the Hawke Centre at the University of South Australia.

Roche has served on many boards and committees, including: St Vincent's Hospital; Sisters of Charity Foundation; Garvan Institute of Medical Research; many university appointments; Committee for Quality of Teacher Education (NSW Government); Duke of Edinburgh's Award Scheme in Australia; various government-appointed roles (NSW and federal governments); Committee for Economic Development of Australia; Centennial Park and Moore Park Trust; and Air Services Australia.

=== Net worth ===
The net worth of Bill and Imelda Roche was estimated at A$1.42 billion in the Financial Review 2019 Rich List. Following the 2022 death of Bill Roche, the Financial Review reported net worth in the name of Imelda Roche solely; that, as of May 2025, was assessed as A$1.76 billion.

Year	Financial Review Rich List		Forbes Australia's 50 Richest	
Year	Rank	Net worth (A$)	Rank	Net worth (US$)
2019	62 ▲	$1.42 billion ▲		
2020	84 ▼	$1.21 billion ▼		
2021	95 ▼	$1.22 billion ▲		
2022				
2023	88 ▼	$1.57 billion ▲		
2024		$1.70 billion ▲		
2025	92	$1.76 billion ▲		

Legend
Icon	Description
Steady	Has not changed from the previous year
▲	Has increased from the previous year
▼	Has decreased from the previous year

=== Recognition and awards ===
- 1986: Australian Pursuit of Excellence Award, for her outstanding leadership and performance in the Direct Selling Industry
- 1995: Officer of the Order of Australia, for her distinguished service too business and commerce, to women's affairs, and to the community
- 1996: Honorary Doctor of Letters from Macquarie University
- April 1997: International recognition in Paris, France, one of the 50 Leading Women Entrepreneurs of the World
- June 1997: Ranked number one in Business Sydney of the Top 25 Women-Owned Businesses in New South Wales
- 2001: Centenary Medal, for significant contribution to the Australian society in business leadership
- 2004: Honorary doctorate from Bond University

Academic offices
Preceded by Paul Scully-Power	Chancellor of Bond University; Imelda Roche; 1999 – 2003	Succeeded by Trevor Rowe
