= Australian Botanic Garden Mount Annan =

Botanical garden in Sydney, Australia

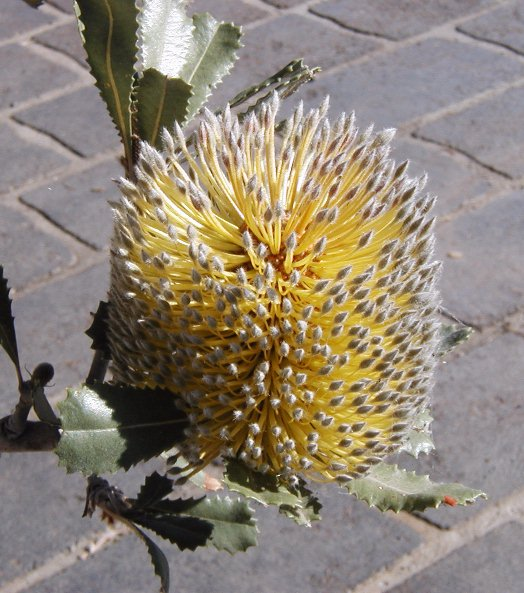
- Banksia ornata, next to the garden's entrance

- Location within Sydney
- Location: Mount Annan, south western Sydney, New South Wales, Australia
- Coordinates: 34°04′13″S 150°46′00″E
- Area: 416 hectares (1,030 acres)
- Opened: 2 October 1988
- Operator: The Botanic Gardens Trust trading the Botanic Gardens & Centennial Parklands
- Visitors: 400,000 (in 2016)
- Status: Open all year
- Website: www.botanicgardens.org.au/australian-botanic-garden-mount-annan

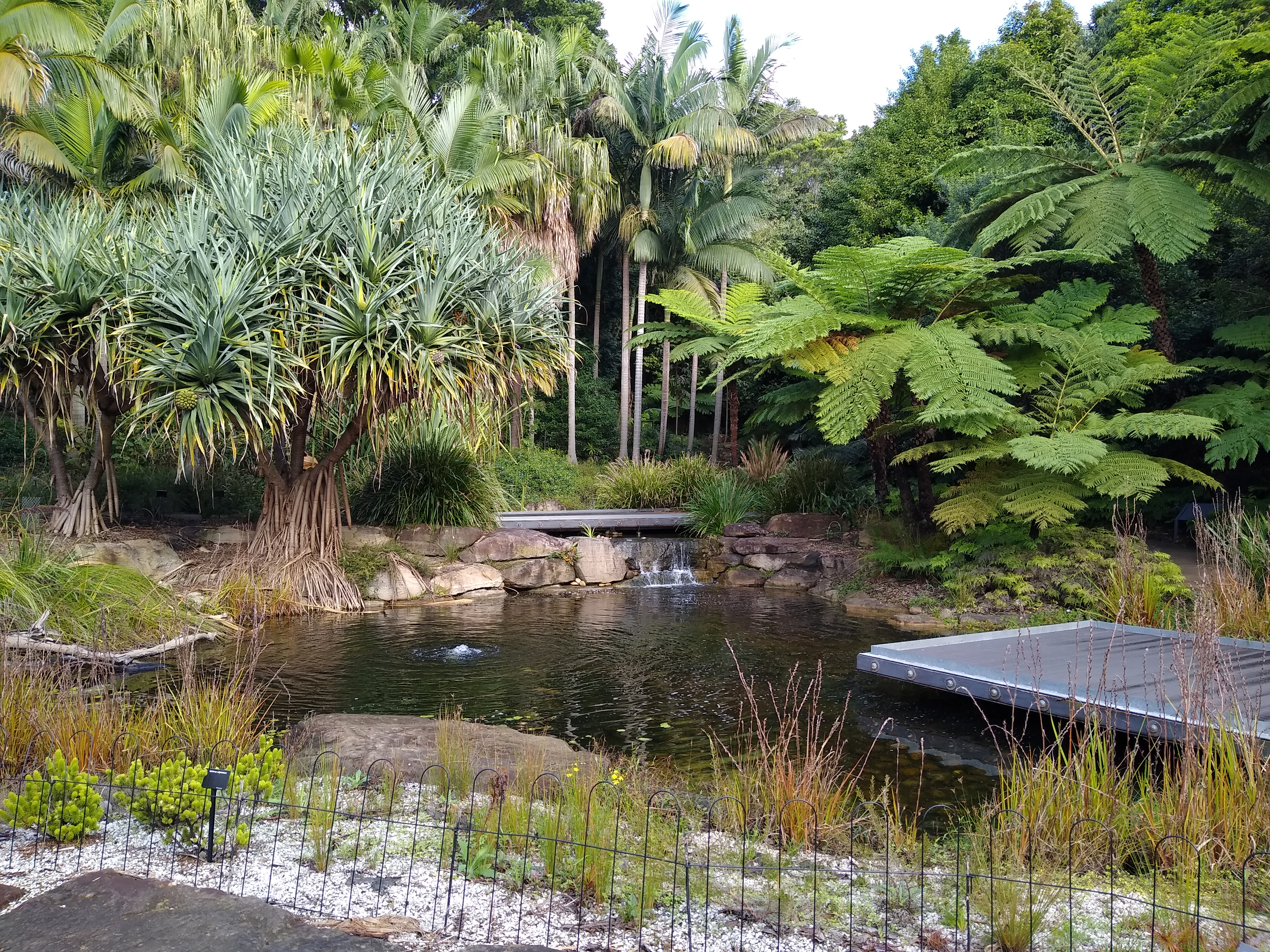
Australian Botanic Garden Mount Annan

The Australian Botanic Garden Mount Annan is a 416-hectare (1,030-acre) botanical garden located in a hilly area of the South Western Sydney suburb of Mount Annan, between Campbelltown and Camden, New South Wales. It is the largest botanical garden in Australia, specializing in native plants, with a collection of over 4000 species. Officially opened in 1988, it was known as Mount Annan Botanic Garden, until 2011.

== History and management ==
The traditional custodians of the land now occupied by the gardens are the Dharawal indigenous Australian people.

Later, it became dairy pasture land, before the land was acquired by the Royal Botanic Gardens and Domain Trust in 1984 and The garden was opened to the public in 1988 by the Duchess of York. The gardens are managed by the Botanic Gardens Trust trading the Botanic Gardens & Centennial Parklands, that also has responsibility for the Royal Botanic Gardens, Sydney and the Blue Mountains Botanic Garden at Mount Tomah. The trust is a division of the NSW Office of Environment and Heritage.

The original name was Mount Annan Botanic Garden and the name was changed in 2011 to The Australian Botanic Garden, Mount Annan.

From 2014, Save a Species Walk has been conducted to raise funds to support saving specific species.

== Description ==
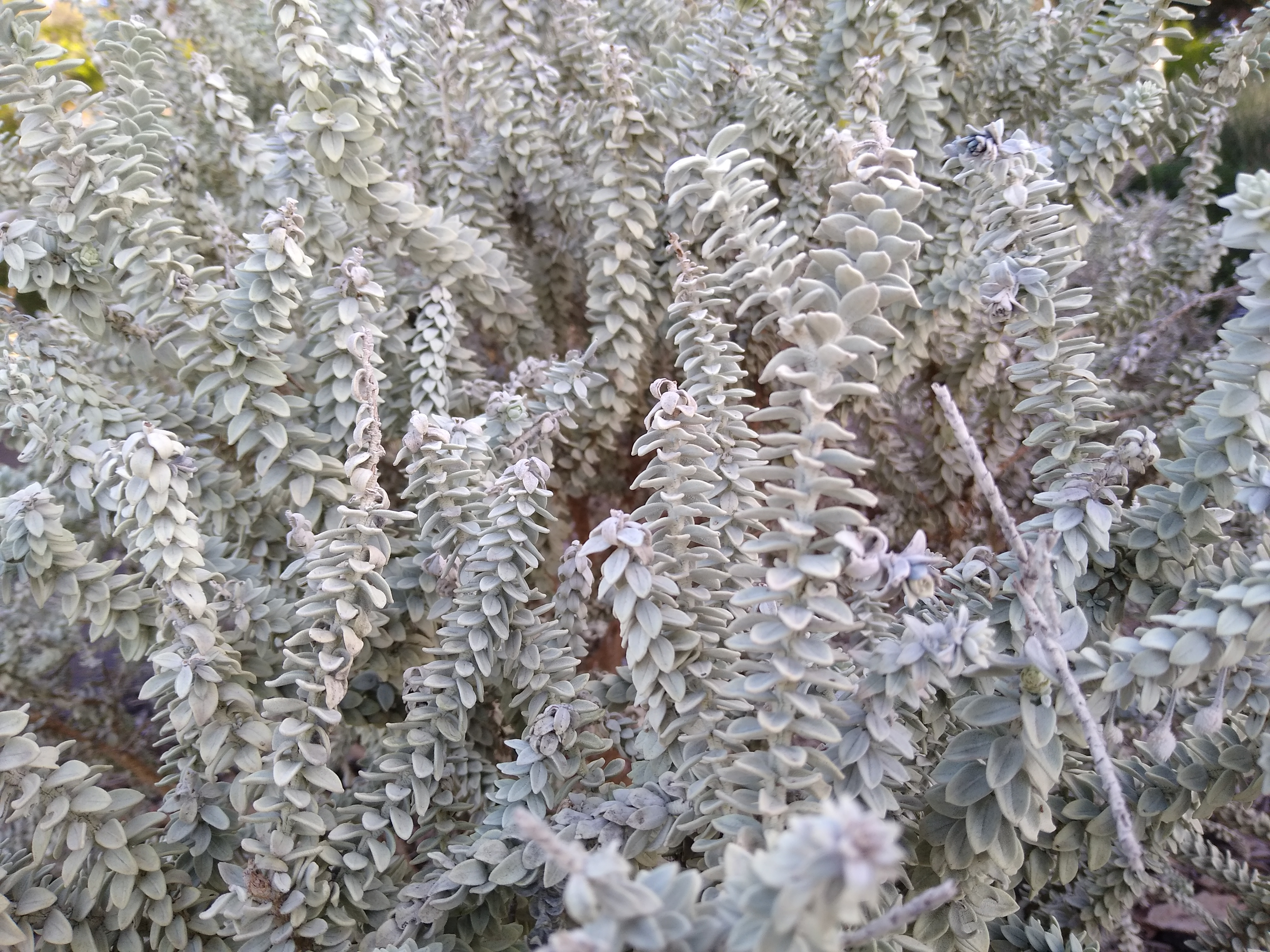
Eremophila lachnocalyx

The garden consists of Australian Bushland with cultivated displays. It is the Australian Plant Garden of the Botanic Gardens Trust and includes not only picnic areas and over 20 kilometres (12 mi) of walking tracks, but also a native flora research facility and the NSW PlantBank. Its themed features include:

- Woodland Conservation Area
- Woodland Picnic Area
- Stolen Generations Memorial
- The Australian PlantBank
- Visitor Centre, Cafe & Playground
- Lakeside Lawn
- Connections Garden
- Fig Tree Wedding Arboretum & Knot
- Sundial of Human Involvement
- Wollemi Discovery Walk
- Big Idea Garden
- Mountain Bike Trail
- Wattle Garden
- Banksia Garden
- Callitris Grove
- Kurrajong Arboretum
- Mallee Eucalypts
- The Blue Tree

The Woodland Picnic Area highlights the endangered Cumberland Plain Woodland found within the estate. The garden is also a haven for over 160 species of birds as well as wallaroos, wallabies and kangaroos that call the garden home. With the rapid growth occurring in the Macarthur region it is quickly becoming a wildlife corridor for native fauna.

Mount Annan Botanic Garden covers a vast area and is accessible by two loop roads that traverse the site, however visitors will miss the beauty of the location if they do not stop throughout and walk around the different garden locations. From the top of Sundial Hill visitors have spectacular 360° views of the surrounding countryside including views of the Sydney skyline.

Since inception, the garden has undergone intense development including major changes to what was once the Terrace Garden that has been renamed to the Connections Garden, which is now the showcase of the estate. Moreover, patches of Western Sydney Dry Rainforest are found within the botanic gardens, where the ecological community is represented in several areas of the gardens.

=== SeedBank ===
The SeedBank was established in 1986 as an integral part of Mount Annan Botanic Garden. Its initial role was to provide wild collected seed for the development of this new Garden, particularly the garden's major collections of wattles, eucalypts and plants in the family Proteaceae. The NSW Seedbank continues to support the ongoing development of Mount Annan Botanic Garden, but today the Seedbank also plays a major role internationally in conservation and research.

=== Plantbank ===
A major new PlantBank building was opened in October 2013 by Professor Marie Bashir AC, CVO, at the time the governor of New South Wales.

=== Wollemi Pine ===
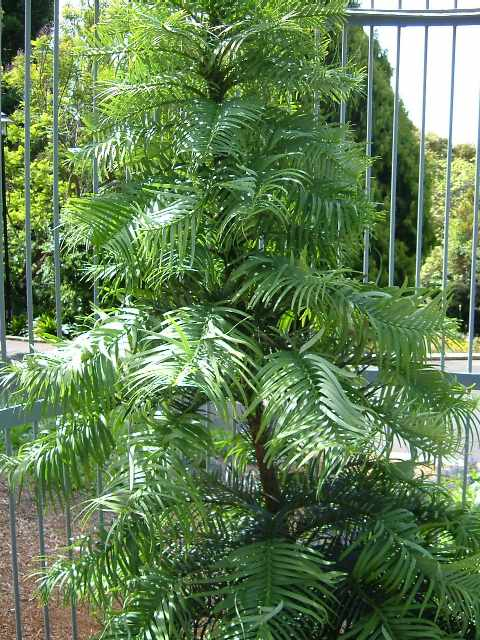
Wollemi Pine protected by a steel cage

The conservation and research includes the endangered Wollemi Pine that was discovered in 1994 in the Wollemi National Park, (part of the Greater Blue Mountains area), 200 kilometres (120 mi) north-west of Sydney. The discovery of the species is considered to be one of the major botanical finds in recent history; it was previously thought to be extinct with only fossil records remaining. After the discovery, on or about 10 September 1994, the Wollemi Pine was first cultivated at Mount Annan in 1995. Prior to them becoming commercially available the trees were so valuable that they were grown inside steel cages to protect them from thieves. As part of the Conservation Management Plan for the pine, Mount Annan Botanic Garden is now home to the only publicly accessible collection of first generation pines (clonal replicas), in the Wollemi Walk of Discovery. The Walk was opened in March 2006 and is currently home to sixty of these Wollemi Pines.

=== Lakes and weather station ===
There are five major lakes in the garden. Lake Gilinganadum and Lake Nadungamba are in the northern section, passed by vehicles entering the garden. In the centre are Lake Sedgwick and Lake Fitzpatrick; whilst in the south is the Wattle Garden lake. Beyond the Wattle Garden lie three even smaller unnamed lakes.

To the east of Lake Nadungamba lies the Campbelltown Weather station, operated by the Bureau of Meteorology.

=== Macarthur Centre for Sustainable Living ===
At the northern end of the garden is the Macarthur Centre for Sustainable Living, which educates the local community on organic gardening. The centre is home to a large community garden for those wishing to grow their own vegetables and other plants, but who have no space in their own backyard. The aim of the centre is to promote sustainability, social equity, cultural diversity and economic stability. The site includes interactive displays of alternative energy production and use, waste water recycling, water and energy efficiency, waste avoidance and management. The facility functions to demonstrate how sustainability can be achieved at the individual household, community and regional levels.

== Activities ==
- Guided tours
- Walks and scenic views
- Bird-watching, including a public bird hide adjacent to Lake Nadungamba
- A dedicated mountain bike area which has singletrack for competent, intermediate, and advanced riders
- Picnic shelters with barbecue facilities
- Café and visitor centre

== See also ==
- Auburn Botanical Gardens
- Blue Mountains Botanic Garden
- Hunter Valley Gardens
- Macquarie Culvert
- Mayfield Gardens
- National Herbarium of New South Wales
- Royal Botanic Garden, Sydney
- The Domain, Sydney
