= Wong (surname) =

Origin
- Origin: China
- Region of origin: China, Bianjing (Kaifeng), Hainan and Hong Kong, Macau

Other names
- Variant forms: Wung, Vong, Huang, Wang, Heng

Wong is the Jyutping, Yale and Hong Kong romanization of the Chinese surnames Huang (traditional Chinese: 黃; simplified Chinese: 黄) and Wang (Chinese: 王), two ubiquitous Chinese surnames; Wang (Chinese: 汪), another common Chinese surname; and a host of other rare Chinese surnames, including Heng (traditional Chinese: 橫; simplified Chinese: 横), Hong (Chinese: 弘), Hong (traditional Chinese: 閎; simplified Chinese: 闳), and Hong (Chinese: 宏)

Note that, while 汪 (Wang/Wung) could be distinguished by its tone, 黃 (Wong/Huang) and 王 (Wong/Wang) are homophones in Cantonese. To differentiate the two in conversation, 黃 (Wong/Huang) is customarily referred to by native Cantonese speakers as 黃色嘅黃 (Wong as in yellow), 黃河嘅黃 (Yellow River Wong), 黃金嘅黃 (yellow gold Wong), 大肚黃 (big belly Wong, as the character resembles a person with a big belly), 江夏黄 (Gong1 Haa6 Wong4 or Jiāngxià Huáng, referring to the people of the Huang state) or by native Mandarin speakers as "grass-head Wong" (due to its first radical), whereas 王 (Wong/Wang) is referred as the 三劃王 "three-stroke Wong" (due to its prominent 3 horizontal strokes) or the 'King' Wong (due to its meaning).

== Distribution ==
In Taiwan, names are written using Chinese characters and are currently romanized using the Hanyu Pinyin but previously Wade-Giles was used and many people retain names as such. In Hong Kong and Macau and among the Chinese diaspora abroad, though, many choose to romanize their name according to their regional pronunciation.

Thus, while there is no official tally of "Wongs" inside China or Taiwan, Wong is the 6th most common Chinese name in Singapore, the 3rd most common Chinese name in America, and the most common Chinese name in Ontario, Canada.

Although recent immigration from central and northern China has caused the pinyin romanizations "Wang" and "Huang" to become more common, "Wong" is still by far the most common version in all three locations, just as "Lee" remains more common than "Li".

== Origins ==
The history of the romanization "Wong" begins in Bianjing (modern-day Kaifeng) during the Song dynasty (a noticeable empress Empress Wang (Taizu). Some historical information showed that the surname can be traced back to 206 BC–220 AD Han dynasty.

The romanisation "Wong" is also linked with mainland Chinese "Wang (surname)" which has a historical name from Zi in Shang dynasty .

The name is widely used in Hong Kong and some of the Commonwealth countries. Many migrants moved to parts of south-east Asia, Europe, Canada, Australia and the United States.

Wong is also a rare English surname derived from Old English "Geong" meaning young. However, Young is the more common surname from this origin.

== People with the surname ==
=== 黃/黄 ===
- Alice Wong (born 1948), Canadian politician
- Andrew Wong (politician) (born 1943), Hong-Kong politician
- Anna May Wong (1905–1961), Chinese-American actress
- Anna Wong (artist) (1930–2013), Canadian artist
- Anthony Wong (born 1961), Hong Kong actor
- Barry Wong (1946–1991), Hong Kong screenwriter, film producer and actor
- BD Wong (born 1960), American actor
- Ben Wong (born 1965), Hong Kong actor
- Betty Ann Wong (born 1938), American author and composer
- Bob Wong (born 1941), Canadian politician
- Bosco Wong (born 1980), Hong Kong actor and singer
- Brandon Wong (actor), Malaysian actor
- Caroline Wong, American cybersecurity executive
- Carrie Wong (born 1994), Singaporean actress
- David T. Wong (born c. 1936), Hong Kong-born American neuroscientist
- Dayo Wong (born 1960), Hong Kong actor and comedian
- Delbert E. Wong (1920–2006), Chinese American judge
- Edward Wong (born 1972), American journalist
- Eleanor Wong (musician), Hong Kong pianist
- Elizabeth Wong (politician) (born 1972), Malaysian politician
- Elizabeth Wong (author), Chinese politician
- Emme Wong (born 1981), Hong Kong actress and singer
- Enrique Wong Pujada (1941–2024), Peruvian politician.
- Felix Wong (born 1961), Hong Kong actor
- Ferlyn Wong (born 1992), Singaporean singer and actress
- Freddie Wong (born 1985), American internet celebrity
- Hosea Wong (born 2003), Bruneian martial artist
- Hsiung-Zee Wong (born 1947), Chinese American composer
- Jade Snow Wong (1922–2006), American ceramic artist and writer
- Jadin Wong (1913–2010), American singer and actress
- Jadyn Wong, Canadian actress
- James Wong (filmmaker) (born 1959), American television producer, writer, and retired film director
- Jan Wong (born 1953), Canadian academic and journalist
- Joe Wong (comedian) (born 1970), Chinese American biochemist and comedian
- Joshua Wong (born 1996), Hong Kong activist and politician
- Joyce Wong (director), Canadian film director and screenwriter
- Kenneth Wong, American political scientist
- Kirk Wong (born 1949), Hong Kong film director and actor
- Kolten Wong (born 1990), American baseball player
- Lawrence Wong (born 1972), Prime Minister of Singapore (2024 - ), Singaporean politician, economist and former civil servant
- Magdalen Wong (born 1981), Hong Kong artist
- Mandy Wong (born 1982), Hong Kong actress
- Michael Wong (actor) (born 1965), Chinese-American actor
- Mimi Wong (1939–1973), Singaporean convicted murderer
- Natalie Wong (born 1975), Hong Kong actress
- Pansy Wong (born 1955), New Zealand politician
- Patrick Wong (born 1947), Canadian politician
- Paul Wong (musician) (born 1964), Hong Kong musician
- Peter Wong (Australian politician) (born 1942), Australian politician
- Peter Wong (Canadian politician) (1931–1998), Canadian politician
- Peter Wong (sports commentator) (born 1944), Hong Kong sports commentator
- Philip Wong (1938–2021), Hong Kong politician
- Race Wong (born 1982), Hong Kong actress and singer
- Raymond Wong Ho-yin (born 1975), Hong Kong actor
- Raymond Wong (civil servant) (born 1957), Hong Kong civil servant
- Raymond Wong Pak-ming (born 1946), Hong Kong film producer, playwright, director and actor
- Raymond Wong (composer) (born 1968), Hong Kong film score composer
- Roberto Wong (born 1979), Costa Rican footballer
- Rosanne Wong (born 1979), Singaporean actress and singer
- Russel Wong (born 1961), Singaporean photographer
- Samuel Wong (born 1962), Hong Kong-born Canadian conductor and ophthalmologist
- Sherine Wong (born 1979), Malaysian Chinese model and beauty pageant titleholder
- Susan Wong (born 1979), Hong Kong singer
- Taylor Wong (1950–2025), Hong Kong film director
- Timothy C. Wong (born 1941), Chinese-American sinologist and translator
- Tony Wong (Canadian politician) (1948–2009), Hong Kong Canadian politician
- Tyrus Wong (1910–2016), Chinese-American artist
- Victor Wong (actor, born 1927) (1927–2001), Chinese-American actor
- Victor Wong (singer) (born 1972), Malaysian Chinese singer
- Willie "Woo Woo" Wong (1927–2005), Chinese-American basketball player
- Wong Ah Kiu (1918–2006), Malaysian woman involved in a freedom of religion case
- Wong Ah Sat, Chinese Australian gold digger, farmer, and merchant
- Wong Chen (born 1968), Malaysian politician and lawyer
- Wong Chi Chung (born 1982), Hong Kong professional footballer
- Wong Chi Tang (born 1979), Hong Kong football referee
- Wong Chin Hung (born 1982), Hong Kong professional footballer
- Wong Choong Hann (born 1977), Malaysian professional badminton player
- Wong Chun-chun (born 1972), Hong Kong actress and film director
- Wong Chun Ting (born 1991), Hong Kong table tennis player
- Wong Chun Yue (born 1978), Hong Kong football coach
- Wong Doc-Fai (born 1948), Chinese martial arts expert
- Wong Fei-hung (1847–1924), Chinese martial artist and physician
- Wong Ho Leng (1959–2014), Malaysian politician
- Wong Jack Man (c. 1941–2018), Chinese martial artist and mteacher
- Wong Jeh Shyan (born 1964), Malaysian businessman
- James Wong Jim (1940–2004), Chinese lyricist and songwriter
- Wong Jinglun (born 1983), Singaporean singer and actor
- Wong Ka Keung (born 1964), Hong Kong musician and singer-songwriter
- Wong Ka Kui (1962–1993), Hong Kong musician and singer-songwriter
- Wong Kam-po (born 1973), Hong Kong racing cyclist
- Wong Kan Seng (born 1946), Singaporean politician
- Wong Kei-ying (1815–1886), Chinese martial artist and physician
- Wong Kew-Lit (born 1971), Malaysian film director and producer
- Wong Kwok-kin (born 1952), Hong Kong politician
- Wong Kwok-pun (born 1946), Hong Kong poet and translator
- Wong Li Lin (born 1972), Singaporean actress
- Wong Mew Choo (born 1983), Malaysian badminton player
- Wong Peng Soon (1918–1996), Malaysian Singaporean badminton player
- Wong Shik Ling (1908–1959), Hong Kong Cantonese linguist
- Wong Shun-leung (1935–1997), Hong Kong martial arts expert
- Wong Sing-chi (born 1957), Hong Kong politician
- Wong Ting-kwong (born 1949), Hong Kong politician
- Wong Yan-lung (born 1963), Hong Kong barrister and judge
- Wong Yiu Fu (born 1981), Hong Kong footballer
- Wong Yuk-long (born 1950), Hong Kong manhua artist
- Wong Yuk-man (born 1951), Hong Kong politician and author
- Wong Yung-kan (born 1951), Hong Kong politician
- Lucas Wong (born 1999), Hong Kong rapper
- Hendery Wong (born 1999) Macanese rapper

=== 王 ===
- Alfonso Wong (1925–2017), Hong Kong manhua artist
- Amy Wong (producer), Hong Kong television drama producer
- Angel Wong, Hong Kong entertainer
- Bryan Wong (born 1971), Singaporean television host, actor and businessman
- Dave Wong (born 1962), Hong Kong-Taiwanese singer, songwriter and actor
- David Shou-Yeh Wong (born c. 1941), Hong Kong billionaire and philanthropist
- Emily Wong (born 1990), Hong Kong actress and singer
- Faye Wong (born 1969), Chinese-Hong Kong singer-songwriter and actress
- Francis Wong (born 1957), American jazz saxophonist, flutist, and erhu player
- Grace Wong (born 1986), Hong Kong actress, TV host and beauty pageant titleholder
- Gregory Wong (born 1978), Hong Kong actor
- H. S. Wong (1900–1981), Chinese newsreel photojournalist
- Hazel Wong, Hong Kong architect
- Ivana Wong (born 1980), Hong Kong singer-songwriter
- Jacky Wong (born 1998), Hong Kong actor
- Joey Wong (born 1967), Taiwanese actress
- Joseph Wong (born 1948), Hong Kong politician
- Kristina Wong, American comedian
- Lawrence Wong (actor) (born 1988), Malaysian Singaporean actor
- Manfred Wong (born 1957), Hong Kong entertainer
- Michael Wong (singer) (born 1970), Malaysian Chinese singer
- Peter Wong (banker) (born 1951), Hong Kong banker
- Ricky Wong (Hong Kong businessman) (born 1962), Hong Kong entrepreneur
- Rosanna Wong (born 1952), Hong Kong social work administrator and politician
- Alexandra Wong (born 1956), Hong Kong social activist
- Roy Bin Wong (born 1949), Chinese economics historian
- Russell Wong (born 1963), American actor
- Teresa Wong, Hong Kong Chinese erhu player
- Vincent Wong (Hong Kong actor) (born 1983), Hong Kong actor and singer
- Winston Wong (born 1951), Taiwanese businessman
- Wong Chin Foo (1847–1898), Chinese-American activist and journalist
- Wong Choon Wah (1947–2014), Malaysian footballer
- Wong Cho-lam (born 1980), Hong Kong entertainer
- Wong Chun Ho (born 1990), Hong Kong professional footballer
- Wang Feifei (born 1987), Chinese singer and actress
- Wong Foon Meng, Malaysian engineer and politician
- Wong He (born 1967), Hong Kong actor and singer
- Wong Jing, Hong Kong filmmaker, actor and presenter
- Wong Kar-wai (born 1958), Hong Kong film director, screenwriter and producer
- Wong Kwok-hing (born 1949), Hong Kong trade unionist
- Wong Tin-lam (1928–2010), Chinese screenwriter, director, and actor

=== 汪 ===
- Wayne Wong (tennis) (born 1981), Hong Kong tennis player
- Wayne Wong (skier) (born 1950), Canadian freestyle skier
- Wong Yue (1955–2008), Hong Kong martial arts actor

=== 翁 ===
- Chi-Huey Wong (born 1948), Taiwanese-American biochemist
- Wong Chin-chu (born 1947), Taiwanese educator and politician

=== Other ===
- Adam Wong (born 1985), Canadian artistic gymnast
- Alan Wong, American chef and restaurateur
- Ali Wong (born 1982), American actress, stand-up comic and writer
- Alice Wong (activist) (1974–2025), American disability rights activist and writer
- Aline Wong (born 1941), Singaporean politician and sociologist
- Alison Wong (born 1960), New Zealand poet and novelist
- Andrea Wong, American businesswoman
- Andy Wong, Chinese actor
- Ansel Wong (born 1945), Trinidadian cultural and political activist
- Anthony Brandon Wong (born 1965), Australian actor
- Baim Wong (born 1981), Indonesian actor
- Bang Wong, academic and professor
- Benedict Wong (born 1970), English actor
- Barbara Jean Wong (1924–1999), Chinese American actress
- Bennet Wong (1930–2013), Canadian psychiatrist, author and lecturer
- Brian Wong (born 1991), Canadian Internet entrepreneur
- Byron Wong, Canadian music producer and musician
- Casanova Wong (born 1945), South Korean actor and martial artist
- Charlene Wong (born 1966), Canadian figure skater
- Christopher Wong (composer), film score composer
- Claire Wong, Malaysian actor, director, producer, and filmmaker
- Connie Wong (born 1977), Hong Kong cricketer
- Connor Wong (born 1996), American professional baseball player
- Cory Wong (born c. 1985), American musician
- Cyril Wong (born 1977), Singaporean poet and writer
- David B. Wong, American philosopher
- Dick Yin Wong (1920–1978), American lawyer and judge
- Donald Wong (born 1952), American businessman and politician
- Eleanor Wong (playwright), Singaporean playwright, writer and lawyer
- Ellen Wong, Canadian actress
- Ernest Wong, Australian politician
- Esther Wong (1917–2005), Chinese American music promoter
- Fang Wong (born 1948), American officer
- Harry Wong, American educator and author
- Howard Wong, American dancer
- Isaiah Wong (born 2001), American basketball player
- Issy Wong (born 2002), English cricketer
- Jadin Wong (1913–2010), American dancer, actress, comedian
- James Wong Chye Fook (born 1953), Malaysian footballer
- James Wong (ethnobotanist) (born 1981), British ethnobotanist and television presenter
- Jo Y. Wong, Chinese mechanical engineer
- Joe Wong (American football) (born 1976), American football player
- Joseph Yu Kai Wong, Canadian physician and philanthropist
- Juan Wong (born 1981), Mexican gridiron football player
- Julia Wong (film editor), American film editor
- Justin Wong (born 1985), American professional fighting game player
- Kailee Wong (born 1976), American football linebacker
- Keno Wong, Bahamian politician
- Kevin Wong (born 1972), American professional beach volleyball player
- Kiki Wong (born 1989), American musician
- Lee Anne Wong, American chef
- Leonard Wong (born 1958), American military researcher and author
- Linda Wong (pornographic actress) (1951–1987), American pornographic actress
- Marjorie Wong Hee (1905–1981), American Hawaiian painter, teacher
- Martha Wong (1939–?), American politician
- Martin Wong (1946–1999), Chinese American painter
- Mary W. S. Wong, Singaporean lawyer
- Mike Wong (born 1955), American ice hockey forward
- Nellie Wong (born 1934), American poet and activist
- Nicole Wong, American attorney
- Norman Wong (writer), American writer and activist
- Patty Wong (model) (born 1980), Peruvian model
- Paul Wong (artist) (born 1954), Canadian multimedia artist
- Penny Wong (born 1968), Australian politician
- Peter Wong (Canadian politician) (1932–1998), Canadian politician
- Pio Wong, Fijian politician
- Ricky Wong (Malaysian businessman) (born 1981), Malaysian businessman and philanthropist
- Rita Wong (born 1968), Canadian poet
- Shawn Wong (born 1949), Chinese American author and scholar
- Stanford Wong (born 1943), gambling author
- Ted Wong (1937–2010), American martial arts practitioner
- Ted Wong (general), American major general and dentist
- Terry Wong, Canadian former helicopter pilot and engineer
- Tobi Wong (1974–2010), Canadian artist and designer
- Victor Wong (actor, born 1906) (1906–1972), Chinese-American actor
- Y. C. Wong (1921–2000), Chinese-American architect
- Wong Chan Tong, Macau civil servant
- Wong Chin Huat, Malaysian political scientist
- Wong Fei-lung (born 1943), Taiwanese actor and director
- Wong How Man (born 1949), Chinese explorer and photojournalist
- Wong Kam Kau (born 1978), Hong Kong fencer
- Wong Kiew-kit (born 1944), Chinese martial arts expert and writer
- Wong Kim Ark, defendant in United States v. Wong Kim Ark, Supreme Court decision confirming U.S. birthright citizenship
- Wong Meng Kong (born 1963), Singaporean chess grandmaster
- Wong Pei Tty (born 1981), Malaysian badminton player
- Wong Sai Hou, Malaysian politician
- Wong Sai Kong (born 1978), Malaysian footballer
- Wong Tsu (1893–1965), Chinese aeronautical engineer

=== Others ===
- Alex Wong (disambiguation)
- Amy Wong (disambiguation)
- Andrew Wong (disambiguation)
- Anthony Wong (disambiguation)
- Brandon Wong (disambiguation)
- Chris Wong (disambiguation)
- David Wong (disambiguation)
- Eleanor Wong (disambiguation)
- Elizabeth Wong (disambiguation)
- Faye Wong (disambiguation)
- Helena Wong (disambiguation)
- James Wong (disambiguation)
- Jing Wong (disambiguation)
- Joe Wong (disambiguation)
- Joshua Wong (disambiguation)
- Julia Wong (disambiguation)
- Linda Wong (disambiguation)
- Michael Wong (disambiguation)
- Paul Wong (disambiguation)
- Peter Wong (disambiguation)
- Raymond Wong (disambiguation)
- Ricky Wong (disambiguation)
- S. L. Wong (disambiguation)
- Stephen Wong (disambiguation)
- Suzie Wong (disambiguation)
- Tony Wong (disambiguation)
- Victor Wong (disambiguation)
- Vincent Wong (disambiguation)

== Fictional characters with the surname ==
- Ada Wong, in the Resident Evil video game series
- Amy Wong, in the Futurama series
- Brad Wong, in Dead or Alive
- Brian Wong, in The World's Worst Children.
- Cleopatra Wong, created by Bobby A
- Dr. Helen Wong, in the Rick and Morty series
- Henry Wong (Digimon Tamers) or Lee Jiang-Liang, in the Digimon series
- Lee Wong, in the Beyblade series
- Maria Wong, in the show Braceface
- Mariah Wong, in the Beyblade series
- Mr. Wong (fictional detective), in short stories created by Hugh Wiley
- Mr. Wong, a character from Norbit
- Nikki Wong, in the show 6teen
- Suzie Wong, in the Digimon series
- Mr. Wong, a character played by Filipino comedian Chiquito beginning in 1963.
- Mr. Wong, in Coronation Street
- Stanford Wong, in Lisa Yee's book Stanford Wong Flunks Big-Time
- Wong Leung, in the PlayStation 2 game The Bouncer

== See also ==
- Variant romanizations (accompanied by further information):
  - Huang (surname)
  - Wang (surname)
- Ah Wong, surname
