= Joe Wong =

Joe Wong may refer to:

- Joe Wong (American football) (born 1976), American football player
- Joe Wong (comedian) (born 1970), Chinese American stand-up comedian
- Joe Wong (musician) (born 1980), American drummer and composer
- Joe Wong (architect), designer of the Carefree sundial

Joseph Wong may refer to:

- Joseph Wong (born 1948), Hong Kong civil servant
- Joseph Wong (political scientist), Canadian academic
- Joseph Yu Kai Wong, Canadian physician and philanthropist

Joey Wong may refer to:

- Joey Wong (born 1967), Hong Kong-based Taiwanese actress and singer
- JW (Hong Kong singer) (born 1990), Hong-Kong singer and actress
- Joey Wong (baseball) (born 1988), American baseball player
- Jo Y. Wong, Canadian professor of mechanical engineering
