= Valerie Ann Mah =

Chinese Canadian educator, community builder and historian (1938–2021)

- Born: Valerie Ann Lor; February 7, 1938; Brockville, Ontario, Canada
- Died: February 7, 2021 (aged 83); Toronto, Ontario, Canada
- Other names: 馬羅榴仙
- Education: University of Toronto Bachelor of Arts in Sociology 1978, Bachelor of Education 1980, Master of Education 1984
- Occupation: Educator
- Employer: Toronto District School Board (retired)
- Known for: First Chinese Canadian Woman School Vice-Principal; Community builder in Toronto's East Chinatown; Historian for Toronto Chinese history
- Spouse: Daniel Mah
- Children: Ian Mah
- Parent(s): Lor Leip, Agnes Lor
- Relatives: Alice Hope, Ruth Lor Malloy, Gloria Spoden, Joe Lor
- Awards: 2012 Queen's Diamond Jubilee Award; 2014 Constance E. Hamilton Award for Women's Equality

Valerie Ann Mah (née Lor) was a Chinese Canadian educator, community builder, and historian from Toronto, Ontario, Canada. Mah was the first woman of Chinese Canadian heritage to serve as Vice-Principal in the Toronto District School Board. She was a historian and prominent member of the Toronto Chinese Community, playing a lead in multiple city and provincial organizations up until her death in 2021.

She ran as the New Democratic Party candidate for Toronto's Don Valley East district during the 2004 Canadian federal election.

== Biography ==
Valerie Mah was born in Brockville, Ontario in 1938 to Lor Leip and Agnes Lor. Her family ran a laundry in the city, followed by a Chinese restaurant, which they operated for over 55 years. Her experience working in her family's restaurant as a child shaped her beliefs on the importance of childhood nutrition, which would guide her later professional initiatives in creating early hot lunch programs and salad bars in her schools.

Her university schooling began with her acceptance into the Toronto's teacher's college and simultaneous degree work at the University of Toronto in the 1970s. Her decision to specialize in education and move to Toronto was greatly influenced by her own personal, education and occupational circumstances at the time, as well as her desire to learn more about her Chinese heritage. After earning a Bachelor of Arts in Sociology and completing her thesis researching the plight of Chinese Canadian bachelor society and life in Toronto's early Chinatown, Mah would go on to complete her Master's in Education.

Mah's professional career began with the Toronto District School Board as a special education teacher where she worked with emotionally disturbed children in her first 17 years. The experience she gained from this would inform the way she interacted with students during her career as an educator. From there, she rose up the ranks to become the first woman Vice-Principal of the school board at the Withrow Public School for six years, and later a Principal at Bruce Public School for nine years. Under her leadership as Principal, she helped lead the Bruce Public School (at the time considered an "inner-city" school) away from slated closure, to creating in it the internationally recognized model for full-day kindergarten still used in Ontario presently. She continued as Principal at the school until her retirement in 2003, working for 43 years in the Toronto school board.

Mah was a prominent community leader and organizer in East Chinatown throughout her life, be it in championing initiatives for the arts and festivals in the neighbourhood, lending support for the community during COVID-19, and organizing numerous local events, including those for Canada Day and Lunar New Year celebrations. For her long service and work, she was commonly greeted in Cantonese as "Mah hou cheung" (馬校長, trans: "Principal Mah") in the Toronto Chinese community.

Mah died at the Toronto Western Hospital on her birthday on February 7, 2021, as a result of cardiac failure.

== Achievements ==
A trailblazer in the education field, Mah was also a community builder and a politically active leader of the Toronto's East Chinatown, playing a leading role in numerous city and provincial organizations:

- Yee Hong Wellness Foundation/頤康基金會 (1994 Founding Member and Director)
- Chinese Cultural Centre of Greater Toronto/大多倫多中華文化中心 (1988 Founding Member)
- Mon Sheong Foundation/孟嘗會 (1964 Founding Member)
- Multicultural History Society of Ontario (Founding Member)
- Toronto Educational Opportunity Fund (TEOF) advocate for children (Head)
- Retired Teachers of Ontario (RTO) Charitable Foundation (Inaugural Chair)
- Woodgreen Community Services (Director)
- Chinese Chamber of Commerce of East Toronto (vice-president)
- Toronto Police Chinese Community Consultative Committee (Member)

As the chair of the RTO, Mah also established a $3 million endowed chair in geriatric medicine at the University of Toronto.

With her belief that children should never go hungry, Mah established food and support programs for underserved children and families throughout her career in education, into her retirement, and up until her death.

One of the most visible testaments of Mah's community leadership is the Chinese Archway (牌坊, páifāng) located just west of the Broadview and Gerrard Street East intersection, which she advocated and organized for its construction as a member of the Chinese Chamber of Commerce of East Toronto together with Councillor Paula Fletcher. The archway and parking lot next to where it is located has since won a prestigious international award in 2012 for Best Design/Implementation of a Surface Parking Lot.

== Awards ==
- 2012 Queen Elizabeth II Diamond Jubilee Award
- Volunteer awards (Ministry of Citizenship and Culture)
- 2014 Constance E. Hamilton Award for Women's Equality (City of Toronto)

== Electoral record ==
Valerie Mah ran in the 2004 Canadian federal election as a NDP candidate for Toronto Don Valley East after her retirement as the Principal at Bruce Public School.

2004 Canadian federal election: Don Valley East
Party	Candidate	Votes	%	±%
Liberal	Yasmin Ratansi	21,864	54.6	-12.0
Conservative	David Johnson	11,206	28.0	+7.7
New Democratic	Valerie Ann Mah	5,287	13.2	+7.4
Green	Dan King	1,172	2.9	
Christian Heritage	Ryan Kidd	351	0.8	+0.3
Communist	Christopher Black	149	0.4	
Total valid votes		40,029	100.0	

Note: Conservative vote is compared to the total of the Canadian Alliance vote and Progressive Conservative vote in 2000 election.
