= Mon Sheong Foundation =

Chinese charity in Toronto

Mon Sheong Foundation (孟嘗會) is a Canadian charity founded in Toronto, Ontario in 1964 to help the Chinese community of Toronto's Chinatowns. The founders of the foundation included Dr. Sim Fai Liu, Valerie Mah, and Reverend Ron Con.

Initially started to provide help for the elderly and promote Chinese cultural awareness, it has grown into a larger charitable organization helping Chinese in the Greater Toronto Area. Its long-term care facilities mainly provide services to Chinese seniors.

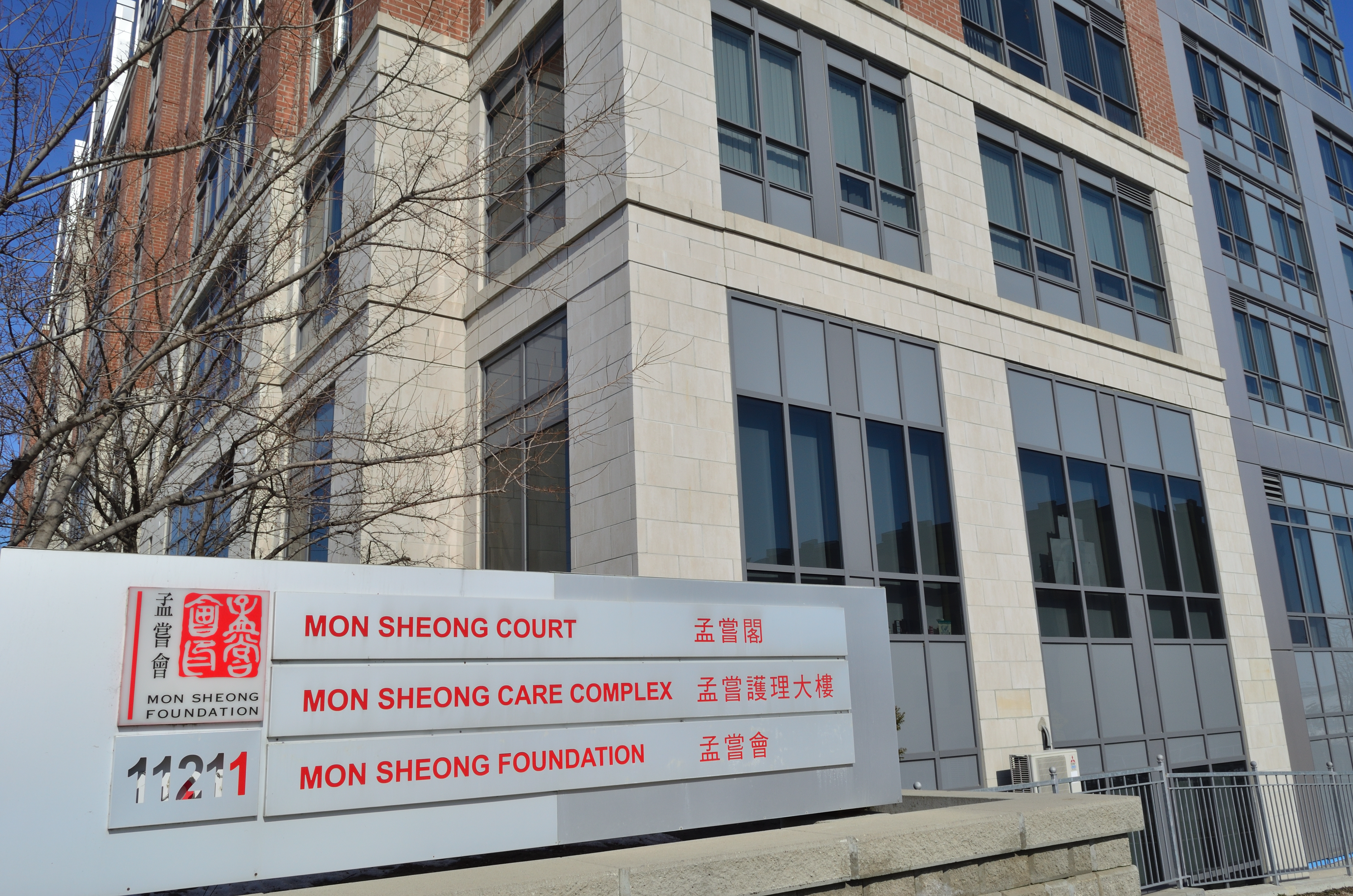
Mon Sheong Richmond Hill Long-Term Care Centre

The foundation's services include:

- quality long-term care services for seniors at five facilities (Toronto, Scarborough, Richmond Hill and two in Stouffville) with a total of 601 beds
- Adult day program for seniors not in facilities, providing them with a meaningful and safe place
- Chinese school to promote awareness of Chinese culture and language in the Chinese community and to others interested in learning; 3 locations with over 1,100 students; operating since 1968
- Youth Group to promote community involvement via volunteer work
- Community & Volunteer Services Centres, one in downtown Toronto and one in Scarborough, to serve seniors in the community

Funding for programs are provided by donations from the community and provincial grants.

MSF services are now in some degree of competition, in terms of donations and support, with Yee Hong Centre for Geriatric Care, which is more inclusive in accepting residents outside of the Chinese community in Toronto.

== Patrons ==
The patrons of the MSF are the Lieutenant Governor of Ontario:

- Pauline McGibbon
- David Onley
- James Bartleman
- Hilary Weston
- Hal Jackman

== See also ==
- Mon Sheong Foundation Chinese School
