= Michael Wang =

Michael Wang may refer to:

- Michael Wang (artist) (born 1981), American artist
- Michael Wang (basketball) (born 2000), Chinese basketball player
- Michael Wang (poker), American poker player
- Michael Wang (scientist), transportation researcher in the US

== See also ==
- Michael Wong (disambiguation)
