= Tony Wong =

Tony Wong may refer to:

- Tony Wong (politician), politician in Ontario, Canada
- Tony Wong (engineer) (born 1959), Australian engineer and academic
- Wong Yuk-long, birth name of comics creator Tony Wong

== See also ==
- Anthony Wong (disambiguation)
