= Linda Wong =

Linda Wong may refer to:

- Linda Wong (singer) (born 1968), Hong Kong singer and actress
- Linda Wong (pornographic actress) (1951–1987), American pornographic actress'

== See also ==
- Linda Wang (fl. 1980s–present), American film and television actress
