= Radio and Television Correspondents' Association =

The Radio and Television Correspondents' Association of Washington, D.C. (RTCA) is an American broadcast journalism group of news reporters from around the world who cover the United States Congress. Founded in 1939, RTCA is best known for holding an annual dinner in Washington, D.C., not to be confused with the higher profile White House Correspondents' Association Dinner.

== Chair of the Association ==
- 2008–2009: Heather Dahl, Feature Story News.
- 2009–2010: Linda Scott, The NewsHour with Jim Lehrer
- 2010–2011: Peter Slen, C-SPAN
- 2011–2012: Jay McMichael, CNN News Photographer
- 2012–2013: John Wallace, III, FOX News photographer
- 2013–2014: Lisa Desjardins, CNN
- 1998–1999: Jim Mills, Fox News

== Awards ==
- David Bloom Award
- Jerry Thompson Award
- Joan Shorenstein Barone Award
- Lifetime Achievement Award

== RTCA Dinners ==
As is the case with the similar but more exclusive WHCA Dinner, the attention given to the Association's activities are far outweighed by the focus on the dinner's guest list and pre-dinner receptions and post-dinner parties hosted by various media organizations.

Also as is true of the WHCA Dinner and Gridiron Club Dinner, the RTCA Dinner has been subject to criticism that it encourages journalists to engage in undue coziness with the political officials they are supposed to fairly cover, and also that the public spectacle of "playing footsie" with reporters' main subjects is bringing the political press into disgrace.

=== Notable RTCA dinners ===
In 1983, the RTCA compiled a videotape of various bloopers made in the news, and even music videos about the news, entitled "Tapes of Wrath". A sequel, "Tapes of Wrath II", followed in 1991. In 1995, President Bill Clinton delivered a speech at the dinner. In 1996, speaker Don Imus made coarse jokes about President Bill Clinton and Hillary Clinton, which White House Press Secretary Mike McCurry termed "tasteless".

During the 2004 dinner, President George W. Bush mocked himself in a slideshow including images of him searching under furniture in the Oval Office for Iraqi weapons of mass destruction, which liberal commentator David Corn termed a "callous and arrogant display".

In 2007, President George W. Bush attended the event for the third time, and JibJab premiered its latest satiric animation, What We Call The News. In 2009, president Barack Obama and humorist John Hodgman were the headline speakers at the dinner. JibJab premiered its animated video "He's Barack Obama".

=== Brief timeline of recent dinners ===
- 1995: Bill Maher
- 1997: Darrell Hammond and Norm Macdonald
- 1999: President Clinton attends just six weeks after his Senate Impeachment Trial. Jackie Judd wins award for reporting on Monica Lewinsky. Jim Mills of Fox News MC's the event.
- 2001: President Bush makes fun of his own grammar.
- 2002: No one from White House attends.
- 2003: Vice President Cheney jokes about President Bush's flight suit.
- 2004: President Bush jokes about WMDs. Controversy erupts.
- 2005: Vice President Cheney talks about then recently deceased Pope John Paul II.
- 2006: Vice President Cheney jokes about hunting.
- 2007: "MC Rove" performs rap onstage.
- 2009 John Hodgman
- 2010: Comedian Joe Wong performs at RTC Dinner.
- 2011: Larry Wilmore
- 2012: Wayne Brady
- 2013: Nick Offerman
- 2015: Aasif Mandvi
- 2016: Hasan Minhaj
- 2017: Roy Wood Jr.

== See also ==
- White House Correspondents' Association
- Gridiron Club
- National Press Club
