= David Wang =

David Wang may refer to:

- David Wang (Australia) (1920–1978), first Chinese Australian elected to the Melbourne City Council
- David Der-wei Wang (born 1954), scholar of Chinese literature
- David Wang (hacker), jail break developer and mobile phone hacker
- Dave Wang (born 1962), singer-songwriter
- Wang Yaoqing or David Wang (born 1974), Taiwanese actor
- David Wang (footballer) (born 2000), Chinese footballer

== See also ==
- David Wong (disambiguation)
