= The Jade Pussycat =

- Directed by: Bob Chinn
- Written by: Bob Chinn
- Starring: John Holmes; Georgina Spelvin; Linda Wong; Steve Balint; Paula Wain; Bonnie Holiday; Jessica Temple-Smith; Jon Martin
- Cinematography: Lazlo Croveny
- Edited by: Jonathan Ross
- Music by: Dennis Carr
- Distributed by: I Candy
- Release date: July 1, 1977
- Running time: 80 minutes
- Country: United States
- Language: English
- Budget: $12,000

The Jade Pussycat is a 1977 pornographic film starring John Holmes. The plot of the film focuses on the search for a priceless jade carving from 13th century China known as "The Jade Pussycat". The character of "Johnny Wadd" is sent to find the Jade Pussycat and find the thieves who stole the item from a museum in Japan. During the search, Mr. Wadd is met by many lustful women. The film is set mainly in San Francisco's Chinatown.

Paul Thomas Anderson, director of Boogie Nights, recommended that his cast watch the film to prepare for their roles, stating, "'This is like Hitchcock doing a porno.'"

== Plot ==
Paul Wexley (Jon Martin) comes off of a cargo ship carrying a black bag. Paul goes to a hotel room where Jasmine (Linda Wong) is staying. Paul pulls out a jade carving of a feline, known as “The Jade Pussycat.” Jasmine is so pleased that she pulls down Paul's pants and performs fellatio. Paul then performs cunnilingus. Paul gets on top of Jasmine and gets in the missionary position. Paul has an orgasm and performs the pull-out method. Soon after Paul orgasms, a gun is placed on the back of his head by two Chinese men, and he is forced to leave with them.

The next scene shows Laureen (Paula Wain) fellating Johnny Wadd (John Holmes). This is interrupted when Jenny (Jessica Temple-Smith) walks in. Wadd and Jenny leave together while Laureen stays in Wadd's office. Jenny is looking for Paul, and she tells John some details about his disappearance. When at Paul’s apartment, they find a key marked, “SFAC.” Jenny then sits on a bed. John removes her skirt and performs cunnilingus on Jenny. Jenny then fellates John. John gets into a missionary position and has sex with her. John pulls out and gives Jenny a cum shot.

The next scene shows Mueller (Steve Balint) receiving The Jade Pussycat from Jasmine. Mueller sees that it is a fake and breaks it on the floor. Mueller orders Jasmine to get him the real Jade Pussycat or she will not be paid. Jasmine then talks with Alexandra (Georgina Spelvin), and undresses. Jasmine and Alexandra then get into a 69 position, and Alexandra fingers Jasmine. Alexandra performs cunnilingus on Jasmine, and Jasmine orgasms.

Wadd enters the lobby of Paul's hotel. He rents the same room that Paul had been staying in and receives some things that were left in Paul's room. When John enters the room, he looks through the things and finds that two toothbrushes were left even though Paul was supposedly alone. John hears a knock at the door and asks who it is. A woman named Sharon (Bonnie Holiday) enters. Sharon is Paul's girlfriend, and she wants the $2,000 USD that Paul borrowed from her to smuggle the Jade Pussycat out of Japan. She tells John that he used the money to sneak a priceless antique out of Japan. She says that she's going to stay in the room until Paul returns. John tells her that he has an idea how to pass the time. John removes Sharon's clothes and performs cunnilingus on her. She performs fellatio on John. John then turns her over and has doggy style sex with her. John orgasms on her buttocks.

In the next scene, Jasmine and the two men she was with are trying to wake up a drugged Paul, to find out what he did with the real Jade Pussycat. Paul tells Jasmine about a key, but then he falls into a deep sleep. Jasmine sends her goon, Tang, to the location of Paul's ex-girlfriend's business. Tang enters her backyard, looks through her window and finds her roommate masturbating with a vibrator. When she finishes, Tang grabs her and forces her to tell him where the key is. When she tells Tang that Sharon has the key and that she will come to her house later, he releases her. Tang then removes his clothes, rapes her, and orgasms on her.

While they are waiting for Sharon, Sharon and John enter the house. John puts a gun to Tang's head and asks him what is he doing there. John tells Tang that he is going to go to jail for a very long time, but he is interrupted by Tang's friend, Frankie. Frankie tells John to put his hands up while Tang leaves. John takes Frankie's gun. Frankie tells John that he is working for Jasmine.

John then walks to a Chinatown warehouse, where he finds Paul dead. Jasmine confronts John with a gun and forces him to give up his gun and put his hands up in the air. Jasmine had found out from Frankie that John had the key. As Jasmine is about to shoot John, a homeless hippie walks through the door and is accidentally shot. John then grabs the gun out of Jasmine's hand and puts it to her head.

John and Laureen from earlier talk inside John's office. After telling John that “SFAC” means “St. Francis Athletic Club” and that the key is a locker key, Laureen says, “Let's finish what we started,” and she performs fellatio on John. John and Laureen then get naked, get on the couch and get into a missionary position. Laureen then gets into a cowgirl position on top of John. John gets back into a missionary position on top of Laureen. John then pulls out and gives Laureen a cum shot.

John goes into a locker room at the athletic club and opens a safe in Paul's locker with the key that he has. Inside is a black bag containing the real Jade Pussycat. John puts the Jade Pussycat back in the black bag and takes it with him. Unknown to John, he is being followed by Frankie.

John meets with an art dealer at his apartment: Alexandra, who wants the Jade Pussycat in her collection. The woman offers John US$25,000 for the Jade Pussycat, but he refuses. Alexandra tells John that to the right buyer it is worth $500,000 USD. She says that she can take him to the right buyer if they split the profit 50/50. John offers her a drink. Alexandra and John kiss deeply, then she offers sex, which John accepts. They open a pullout couch, undress and get on the bed. She fellates him. John lies her down and gets into a missionary position. John turns her over and has sex with her from behind, after which he orgasms on her.

After finishing sex, Alexandra asks John for some matches. When John reaches for them, she knocks him unconscious and steals the black bag, taking it to Mueller. When Mueller finds a statue of Jesus instead of the Jade Pussycat. He laughs and says “I'll keep this as a memento.” Mueller vows that some day he will get the Jade Pussycat.

John wakes up and pulls the real black bag out of a cabinet that contains the Jade Pussycat. The next scene shows John next to the San Francisco-Oakland Bay Bridge, and he says that “No matter how much an item is worth it is not worth a human life. Something tells me that I should just throw it in the bay and be done with it, but again I'm only human and this thing is worth a lot of money.”

== Cast ==
- John Holmes as ”Johnny Wadd”
- Georgina Spelvin as Alexandra
- Linda Wong as Jasmine
- Steve Balint as Mueller
- Paula Wain as Laureen
- Bonnie Holiday as Sharon
- Jessica Temple-Smith as Jenny
- Jon Martin as Paul
- Yvonne Green as Cathy
- Jimi Lee as Tang
- Bob Chinn as Frankie
- Mark Lewis as Desk Clerk
- Elliot Lewis as "Hippie"

== See also ==
- Golden Age of Porn
