= Alex Wong =

Alex Wong may refer to:

- Alex Wong, Malaysian musician who performs under the stage name "SingleTrackMind"
- Alex Liang Wong (born 1974), American singer-songwriter
- Alex Nelson Wong, American government official
