= Peter Wong =

Peter Wong may refer to:

- Peter Wong (banker) (born 1951), General Manager of HSBC Group and an executive director of Hong Kong and Shanghai Banking Corporation Limited
- Peter Wong (sports commentator) (born 1944), Hong Kong–based host of a number of sporting programmes
- Peter Wong (Australian politician) (born 1942), Australian politician, Unity Party member of the New South Wales Legislative Council
- Peter Wong (Canadian politician) (1931–1998), Canadian municipal politician in Sudbury, Ontario
- Peter C. Wong (1922–1989), member of the Executive Council and Legislative Council of Hong Kong
- Peter Wong Hong-yuen (born 1944), member of the Legislative Council of Hong Kong (1988–1995)
- Peter Wong Man-kong (1949–2019), member of the National People's Congress from Hong Kong (1993–2019)
