= Terramechanics =

Terramechanics Terramechanics is the study of soil properties, specifically the interaction of wheeled or tracked vehicles on various surfaces.

The rolling resistance of a tire on soft soil consists mainly of the following components:

- soil compaction
- the bulldozing effect
- displacement of soil particles
- sidewall friction

== See also ==
- Mieczysław G. Bekker
- Jo Y. Wong
- Bevameter
