= Andrew Wang =

Andrew Wang or Andrew Wong may refer to:

- Andrew Wang (coach), Chinese figure skating coach in Australia
- Andrew H. J. Wang (born 1945), Taiwanese biochemist
- Andrew Wong (politician), a Hong Kong politician
- Andrew Wong, a chef de cuisine of A. Wong

== See also ==
- Andrea Wong, an American businesswoman
