= David Wong =

David Wong may refer to:

- David T. Wong (born 1935), Chinese-American scientist whose work contributed to the invention of fluoxetine (Prozac)
- David Shou-Yeh Wong (born c. 1941), Hong Kong billionaire, finance tycoon and philanthropist
- David Wong Dak Wah (born 1953), Chief Judge of the High Court of Sabah and Sarawak
- David B. Wong (fl. 1971–present), American philosophy professor at Duke University
- Jason Pargin (born 1975), American humor writer and editor at Cracked.com, who wrote under the pseudonym "David Wong" until 2020
- David Wong (bassist), (born 1982), American jazz bassist
- David Wong (singer) (1964–2026), Hong Kong-American Mandopop singer based in Taiwan

== See also ==
- Dave Wang (born 1962), Taiwanese singer
- David Wong Louie (1954–2018), American writer of novels and short stories
- David Wang (disambiguation)
