= Mon Sheong Foundation Chinese School =

Fee-operated Chinese private school

Coordinates: 43°54′08.5″N 79°26′35.4″W

Mon Sheong Foundation Chinese School is a fee-operated private school, with focus on promoting Chinese culture, heritage, and philosophy.

The MSFCS was created in 1968 by the Mon Sheong Foundation in Toronto and uses Cantonese/Putonghua as the language of instruction.

Today MSFCS offers additional programs including:

- Chinese (Cantonese) Program for children over the age of 3
- Chinese (Putonghua) Program for children over the age of 3
- Conversational Putonghua Program
- Mathematics Program for grades 1 to 12

Programs run on Friday evenings and Saturdays from September to May.

Instructors are mainly college graduates from Hong Kong, China and Canada.

== Facilities ==
The MSFCS does not have permanent facilities and obtains leases from York Region District School Board and Toronto District School Board for its after-school or weekend programs.

- Etobicoke Campus: Dixon Grove Middle School
- Markham Campus: Pierre Elliott Trudeau High School
- North York Campus: Earl Haig Secondary School
- Richmond Hill Campus: H.G. Bernard Public School

Previous locations:

- Scarborough Campus: W.A. Porter Collegiate Institute (Scarborough Board of Education)

== Scholarships ==
- Dr. Sim Fai Liu Awards for Outstanding Achievement
- Mandarin Scholarships
- Ming Shau Yau Scholarships
- Ping Shao Quan Awards for Academic Achievement
- Leon & Susan Foon-Chim Endowment Fund Scholarships

== Alumni and Notable Faculty ==
- Dr. Sim Fai Liu (1919–1999) MD, OOnt - co-founder Mon Sheong Foundation Chinese School; resident at Toronto Western Hospital and medical director at Lambert Lodge and Castleview-Wychwood Towers
- Ping Shao Quan - former Chair and Chinese School Principal
- Helena Zhang - Principal, Etobicoke Campus
- Paul Chan - Principal, Markham Campus
- Alain Tan - Principal, North York Campus
- Jephunneh Cheng - Principal, Richmond Hill Campus
