= Joshua Wong (disambiguation) =

Joshua Wong (born 1996) is a Hong Kong student activist.

Joshua Wong may also refer to:

- Siua Wong (born Joshua Wong, 2003), Fiji and Tonga international rugby league footballer
- Joshua Wong (1906–1981), East Indies film director and one of the Wong brothers
- Joshua Wong (21st century), Hong Kong musician with Noughts and Exes
