= Natural Moralities: A Defense of Pluralistic Relativism =

2006 book by David B. Wong

- Author: David B. Wong
- Language: English
- Subject: moral relativism
- Published: 2006
- Publisher: Oxford University Press
- Media type: Print
- Pages: 312
- ISBN: 9780195305395

Natural Moralities: A Defense of Pluralistic Relativism is a 2006 book by David B. Wong that defends a version of moral relativism.

== Reception ==
The book was reviewed by Christopher W. Gowans (Fordham University) and Diego E. Machuca (Consejo Nacional de Investigaciones Cientificas y Tecnicas).
