= Bevameter =

A bevameter is a device used in terramechanics to measure the mechanical properties of soil. Bevameter technique was developed to measure terrain mechanical properties for the study of vehicle mobility. The bevameter test consists of penetration test to measure normal loads and shear test to determine shear loads exerted by a vehicle. Bevameter area size need to be the size of the wheel or track. DEM analysis can take data from one size and simulate bevameter performance for a different size.
