= Stephen Wong =

Stephen, Steven, Steve or Stefan Wong may refer to:

- Steve Wong Ka Keung, Hong Kong singer-songwriter and member of Beyond
- Stephen Wong Ka-lok (born 1978), Hong Kong actor
- Stefan Wong (actor), Hong Kong actor, also known as Stephen Wong
- Steven Wong (born 1988), BMX cyclist for Hong Kong
- Stephen Wong Yuen-shan (born 1975), Hong Kong politician
