= Vincent Wong =

Vincent Wong may refer to:

- Vincent Wong (British actor) (1928–2015), British-Chinese actor
- Vincent Wong (Hong Kong actor) (born 1983), Hong Kong actor
- Vincent Wong Wing Ki (born 1990), Hong Kong badminton player
