= Noughts and Exes =

Hong Kong rock band

- Origin: Hong Kong
- Genres: Indie rock, folk rock
- Years active: 2007–2015
- Past members: Joshua Wong; Gideon So; Alex Bedwell; Alix Farquhar; Winnie "Wizza" Lau; Winnie "Bago" Lau

Noughts and Exes was a Hong Kong–based six-piece indie folk rock band formed by singer and guitarist Joshua Wong that also included Gideon So, Alex Bedwell, Winnie "Wizza" Lau, Winnie "Bago" Lau, and Alix Farquhar. The group released three studio albums between 2007 and 2015, two of which were mixed by double-platinum producer Kelvin Avon.

The group was known for their innovative music videos, one of which was featured in the Los Angeles Asian Pacific Film Festival.

== History ==
In 2007, after a successful run with the band Whence He Came, singer Joshua Wong recruited a group of musicians to accompany him during live performances of his new project, Noughts and Exes. The group released their first album, Act One, Scene One, in 2008. In 2009, Wong and a fresh roster of musicians worked on new material and a year later, The Start of Us was released. In 2014, the group issued their third, and last, studio album, titled Noughts and Exes, which debuted with a viral flash mob musical performance of the single "Hearts" at Times Square in Hong Kong.

Wong died on 25 December 2020 from adenoid cystic carcinoma.

== Band members ==
- Joshua Wong – vocals, guitars
- Gideon So – piano, keyboards, melodica, glockenspiel, vocals
- Alex Bedwell – vocals, glockenspiel, percussion
- Alix Farquhar – drums, percussion, vocals
- Winnie "Wizza" Lau – bass
- Winnie "Bago" Lau – violin

== Discography ==
- Act One, Scene One (2008)
- The Start of Us (2009)
- Noughts and Exes (2014)

== Accolades ==
- Number 2 on Time magazine's Top 5 Bands to Watch.
- The Start of Us named top ten album in HK for 2010 by Time Out magazine.
- Vapor Music Artist of the Week
- Favourite local band in The Guardian's 2015 insider cultural guide to Hong Kong
