= SingleTrackMind =

- Born: Alexander Wong
- Origin: Kuching, Sarawak, Malaysia
- Genre: Alternative rock
- Occupations: Singer-songwriter, musician jet ski racer (retired)
- Years active: 2002–present
- Labels: Power Records/PMP (independent)
- Website: http://www.singletrackmind.tv

Alex Wong is a Malaysian independent musician and singer who performs under the stage name SingleTrackMind, and also a retired professional jet ski racer. To date (October 2007), he has released two full albums, earned three award nominations at the Anugerah Industri Muzik, and won eight international races in the 1990s for his jet ski team.

== Biography ==
=== Jet skiing ===
Being among Malaysia's earliest batch of competitive jet skiers, Wong had joined two professional jet-skiing teams. He started out under the Wong's Way Racing banner in 1987, His first championship was at the 1991 Dhananbalan Cup in Singapore, and he was elevated to professional status the following year. He went on to win the 1994 Philippine Championships in Cebu; the 1995, 1996 and 1998 Malaysian Championships; the 1995 Korean Championships in Pijin Island; the 1996 Australian Championship in Queensland; and the 1998 Asia Pacific King's Cup in Songkhla, Thailand. In 1998 he moved to Petronas Jet Sport Racing Team, but never won any championship since.

=== Music ===
==== No Reason ====
Wong moved on to music and performed his first stage appearance in the Rock the World III music festival in Kuala Lumpur in 2002. He released his first album, No Reason in 2003, while still being a member of Petronas Jet Sport. The album, which contained his debut single of the same title, earned him three nominations for Best New Local English Artist, Best Engineered Album and Best Music Video in the 2004 AIM. Wong finally concluded his jet-skiing career at the World King's Cup Watercross in Thailand in 2006.

Since Rock the World III, SingleTrackMind held a total of 34 stage appearances throughout the year 2003 in conjunction with his debut album, including eight in China, Philippines, Thailand and Singapore. In the following three years, he remained active in live performances, having done another 34 gigs and stage appearances including those in Indonesia and Singapore. He was the opening act for Deep Purple's concert in Singapore in 2004 and the Malaysian leg of the INXS Switch On World Tour 2006 in Kuala Lumpur.

==== [hey.] ====
On 1 March 2007, SingleTrackMind released his second full album, [hey.], which featured One Day, an English remake of Indonesian song Mungkin Nanti, originally performed by Peterpan, alongside first single Seventeen (God at the Beach), which was penned by the artist himself as a dedication to an acquaintance of his who died suddenly. According to him on the Malaysian English Top 10 aired on 28 October 2007, Seventeen was so titled and made the seventh track of his album because 17 July was the acquaintance's birthday. SingleTrackMind also finished a six-leg Indonesian tour in Bali, Surabaya, Jakarta and Bandung, in mid-August.

Besides this, the album, which nine of its ten tracks were recorded in Los Angeles, had two tracks (Still The Same and Light Fades) which would be featured in American indie film The 3rd Doorway.

== Discography ==
No Reason

- Released: 2003
- Format: CD
- Label: Fat Boys Records
- Tracks: Thirteen
- Singles: "No Reason", "People in My Own World"

[hey.]

- Released: 1 March 2007
- Format: CD
- Label: Power Records/PMP
- Producer: Bob Koszela
- Tracks: Ten
- Singles: "Seventeen (God at the Beach)", "One Day"
