= Joseph Wong (political scientist) =

Canadian senior academic

Vice-President, International of the University of Toronto
- Incumbent
- Assumed office July 1, 2020
- President: Meric Gertler; Melanie Woodin

Academic background
- Education: McGill University (BA); University of Wisconsin-Madison (PhD)
- Thesis: Democracy and welfare : health policy in Taiwan and South Korea (2001)

Academic work
- Institutions: University of Toronto
- Notable works: Betting on Biotech: Innovation and the Limits of Asia’s Developmental State, (2011), and Healthy Democracies: Welfare Politics In Taiwan and South Korea (2018), both published by Cornell University Press, and 'From Democracy to Development: The Transformations of Modern Asia,' co-authored with Dan Slater and published (2022) with Princeton University Press.

Joseph Wong was the Canada Research Chair for health, democracy and development, is the Roz and Ralph Halbert Professor of Innovation at the Munk School of Global Affairs & Public Policy, and is currently the Vice-President, International of the University of Toronto.

He is the author of Betting on Biotech: Innovation and the Limits of Asia's Developmental State, and Healthy Democracies: Welfare Politics In Taiwan and South Korea, both published by Cornell University Press, and From Democracy to Development: The Transformations of Modern Asia, co-authored with Dan Slater and published (2022) with Princeton University Press.

== Education ==
Wong has a bachelor's degree from McGill University and both a master's degree and a Ph.D from University of Wisconsin-Madison.

== Career ==
Wong has collaborated with the World Bank and United Nations and from 2005 to 2014, he was the Director of the Asian Institute at the Munk School of Global Affairs & Public Policy. While teaching at the Munk School he was awarded the University of Toronto Faculty of Arts and Science's Outstanding Teaching Award.

Wong is professor of political science in the Faculty of Arts and Science, and the Roz and Ralph Halbert Professor of Innovation at the Munk School. He has previously served both as the Associate Vice-president and as the Vice-Provost of the University of Toronto.

He was appointed as the Vice-President, International of the University of Toronto in 2021 after being given the role on an interim basis in 2020. While working at the University of Toronto, Professor Wong helped introduce new academic designations as part of a wider effort to encourage more international study by Canadian students. Also at the University of Toronto, Wong founded the Reach Alliance, a student-led project that researches ways for organizations and governments to get essential services to marginalized people in the most difficult to reach locations.

He is often quoted in the media about issues affected international students in Canada, specifically about the revocation of scholarships supporting students from Saudi Arabia. He has also been quoted by international media about Taiwanese politics. Canadian media also reported his advocacy for free speech and his support for Afghan students.

He serves on the board of directors of Upper Canada College.

From 2006 to 2016, he held the Canada Research Chair in health, democracy and development.

== Selected publications ==
- Wong, Joseph, Betting on Biotech: Innovation and the Limits of Asia’s Developmental State, Cornell University Press, 2011, ISBN: 9780801450327, cited 181 times.
- Wong, Joseph, Healthy Democracies: Welfare Politics In Taiwan and South Korea, Cornell University Press, 2018, ISBN: 9780801473494, cited 375 times.

== See also ==
- International students in Canada
- Canada–Saudi Arabia relations
