= Raymond Wong =

Raymond Wong may refer to:

- Raymond Wong (civil servant) (born 1958), current Permanent Secretary for Education and Manpower of Hong Kong
- Raymond Wong Ho-yin (born 1975), Hong Kong actor
- Raymond Wong Pak-ming (born 1946), Hong Kong film director, producer, scriptwriter and actor
- Raymond Wong (composer), Hong Kong film score composer
- Raymond Wong Yuk-man (born 1951), radio host, political commentator, and member of the Legislative Council of Hong Kong
- Ray Wong (born 1993), Hong Kong activist
