= Ah Wong =

Ah Wong is a surname. Notable people with the surname include:

- Nigel Ah Wong (born 1990), New Zealand rugby union player
- Rosie Ah Wong, New Zealand soccer player
