= Jing Wong =

Jing Wong is the name of:

- Wong Jing (born 1955), pinyin Wang Jing, Hong Kong film director, producer, actor, presenter, and screenwriter
- Wong Jinglun (born 1983), English name Jing Wong, Singaporean Mandopop singer, actor
