= Ricky Wong =

Ricky Wong may refer to:

- Ricky Wong (Malaysian businessman) (born 1981), Malaysian entrepreneur and founder of Asia Media
- Ricky Wong (Hong Kong businessman) (born 1961), Hong Kong businessman
- Ricky Wong, fictional character from the television series We Can Be Heroes: Finding the Australian of the Year
