= Amy Wong (disambiguation) =

Amy Wong is a character from the animated series Futurama.

Amy Wong may also refer to:

- Amy Wing-Hann Wong, Canadian visual artist
- Amy Wong (producer), Hong Kong television drama producer
