= Michael Wang (artist) =

American artist

- Born: 1981 (age 44–45); Olney, MD, U.S.
- Education: Harvard University (BA); New York University (MA); Princeton University (MArch)
- Occupation: Artist
- Known for: Extinct Species; Carbon Sketches; World View; Lake Tai
- Movement: Systems art, Conceptual art, Environmental art
- Website: www.michaelwang.info

Michael Benjamin Wang (born May 12, 1981) is an American artist based in New York. Wang's work uses systems that operate at a global scale as media for art: climate change, species distribution, resource allocation and the global economy. His works include Carbon Copies, an exhibition linking the production of artworks to the release of greenhouse gases, World Trade, a series tracing the trade in steel from the World Trade Center following the attacks of September 11, 2001; and Extinct in the Wild, a project that brings species that no longer exist in nature, but that persist under human care, into spaces of art. Wang's work has been shown in Europe, North and South America, and Asia, including the 13th Shanghai Biennale, Lower Manhattan Cultural Council's Arts Center at Governors Island in New York City, Manifesta 12 in Palermo, Italy, the Swiss Institute Contemporary Art New York, Parque Cultural de Valparaíso, Fondazione Prada in Milan, and Foxy Production in New York.

== Early life and education ==
Wang was born in Olney, Maryland. He received his BA in Social Anthropology and Visual and Environmental Studies from Harvard University in 2003, an MA in Performance Studies from New York University in 2004, and an M.Arch from Princeton University in 2008.

== Work ==
=== Early work ===
Early work includes the series Rivals (2014–), which engages the history of the readymade and its relationship to corporate capitalism, and Carbon Copies (2012–), which represents the carbon footprints of well known contemporary artworks as a set of sculptural objects. These objects, which the artist calls "Carbon Copies", are in turn sold in exchange for carbon offsets, erasing the carbon footprints of the works they represent.

=== Extinct in the Wild (2014–) ===
Wang's project Extinct in the Wild was first presented at the Fondazione Prada in Milan in 2017. It brings species of plants and animals that are no longer found in nature – but persist under human care – into spaces of art.

=== The Drowned World (2018) ===
For Manifesta 12 in Palermo, Italy, Wang presented a series of works titled The Drowned World. These drew connections between ancient organic processes and climate change. They included a pool tinted green by cyanobacteria and a living recreation of a Carboniferous period forest planted within the ruins of a coal gas plant.

=== Extinct in New York (2019) ===
Extinct in New York was one of two inaugural exhibitions at the Lower Manhattan Cultural Council's Arts Center at Governors Island in the fall of 2019. It returned to New York City species of plants, algae, and lichen known historically from the city but that no longer grow wild in any of the five boroughs. It was curated by Swiss Institute and was covered in Artforum, Fast Company, Art in America, and Hyperallergic.

=== 10000 li, 100 billion kilowatt-hours (一万里，一千亿千瓦时) (2021) ===
10000 li, 100 billion kilowatt-hours was commissioned by the Power Station of Art for the 13th Shanghai Biennale. Installed within Columbia Circle in Shanghai, the work—consisting of a large refrigeration unit and misting system—re-created a fragment of the glaciers at the origin of the Yangtze River. The piece drew energy from the Shanghai electric grid (powered, in part, by the Three Gorges Dam on the Yangtze) and water from the Shanghai tap (also drawn from the Yangtze). With this work, Wang sought to connect these aspects of Shanghai's infrastructure back to their natural, hydrological origins, and to reveal the linkages between subtropical Shanghai and the distant glaciers of the Qinghai-Tibet plateau.

=== Lake Tai (太湖) (2022) ===
This show explored the ecological and cultural histories of Lake Tai, the large freshwater lake linked to the waterways of Shanghai. Installed in the former mansion of a turn-of-the-century industrialist—whose businesses operated between Lake Tai and Shanghai—the show reimagined traditional Chinese arts of the home, with many of the works made from organic wastes sourced from Lake Tai and the surrounding region. The show was organized with the support of Fondazione Prada.

=== Mirror Moon (2023) ===
Mirror Moon was an outdoor projection that simulated a view of the Moon's “far” side – the back side of the Moon that is never visible from Earth. The work imagined an enormous mirror installed behind the Moon, reflecting its far side back to terrestrial viewers. The phases of the Moon's far side reverse those of the Moon seen in the sky. Mirror Moon ran for 29 days, making visible the daily changes in phase of the Moon's far side over the course of a complete lunar cycle. The work was included in Elevation 1049 "Interstices," curated by Olympia Scarry and Neville Wakefield.

== Writing ==
Wang has written extensively on art, architecture, technology and the environment.

His writing has appeared in Artforum, Art in America, Texte zur Kunst, and Mousse. He published an essay on the “back breeding” of the extinct aurochs in Cabinet, and an essay on the work of artist Ryan Trecartin in the reader Mass Effect: Art and the Internet in the Twenty-First Century.

== Awards ==
Wang was a recipient of a Joan Mitchell Foundation Painters & Sculptors Grant in 2017 and the Curate Award, presented by the Fondazione Prada and the Qatar Museums Authority, in 2014.
