= Julia Wong =

Julia Wong may refer to:

- Julia Wong (field hockey) (born 1975), Canadian former field hockey player
- Julia Wong (film editor), American film editor
- Julia Wong (politician), Norwegian politician
- Julia Carrie Wong, journalist

== See also ==
- Julia Wong Pei Xian (born 1987), badminton player from Malaysia.
