= Victor Wong =

Victor Wong may refer to:

- Victor Wong (actor, born 1927) (1927–2001)
- Victor Wong (actor, born 1906) (1906–1972)
- Victor Wong (singer) (born 1972)
