= Tony Wong (engineer) =

Tony Wong (born 12 March 1959) is an Australian engineer and academic known for his work in sustainable urban water management, water sensitive cities, and informal settlement revitalization. He is Professor of Sustainable Development at Monash Sustainable Development Institute. He is an elected Fellow of the Australian Academy of Technological Sciences and Engineering and the recipient International Water Association's Global Water Award.

== Education and career ==
He completed a Bachelor of Engineering (Hons) in Civil Engineering at Monash University in 1981, followed by a PhD in Water Resources Engineering from the same university in 1984.

Wong began his professional career at GHD Pty Ltd in 1985 as a hydrology and hydraulics engineer and later joined Monash University in 1991 as a senior lecturer. He became an associate professor and was later promoted to professor, serving as Head of Water Engineering and Research Program Leader.

In 2002, he became Chief Executive Officer of the Facility for Advancing Water Biofiltration and Director of Ecological Engineering Pty Ltd. From 2007 to 2010.

From 2010 to 2021, Wong served at Monash University as Chief Executive of the Centre for Water Sensitive Cities and later the Cooperative Research Centre for Water Sensitive Cities (CRCWSC).

== Research and scholarly works ==
Wong’s research has focused on urban hydrology, stormwater quality management, and sustainable urban water systems. He edited technical references, including Australian Runoff Quality: A Guide to Water Sensitive Urban Design, and conducted studies on urban stormwater treatment modelling and ecological engineering applications.

His later scholarship developed the concept of the water sensitive city.

Wong’s recent research has examined interdisciplinary urban sustainability challenges, including circular economy transitions, river restoration, climate adaptation, and the relationship between urban water systems, public health, and planetary health.

== Awards ==
He received the International Water Association Global Water Award in 2018. He was named Civil Engineer of the Year by Engineers Australia in 2010 and elected Fellow of the Australian Academy of Technological Sciences and Engineering in 2014.
