= Kenneth Wong =

American political scientist

- Born: Kenneth K. Wong
- Education: University of Chicago
- Scientific career
- Fields: Political Science
- Workplaces: Brown University

Kenneth K. Wong is an American political scientist, currently the Walter and Leonore Annenberg Professor of Education Policy, Chair of Education, Professor of Urban Studies and Professor of International and Public Affairs, Professor of Political Science at Brown University. He has been listed in Who's Who in American Education, Who's Who in the Midwest, Who's Who Among Asian Americans, Who's Who in the World.
