= Chris Wong =

Chris Wong may refer to:

- Chris Wong (skier) (born 1981), Canadian freestyle skier
- Christopher Wong (born 1961), Hong Kong singer-songwriter and radio host
- Fresh Kid Ice (1964–2017), stage name of Chris Wong Won of 2 Live Crew
- A placeholder name used in English language papers of the Hong Kong Diploma of Secondary Education and its predecessor public examinations
