= Michael Wong =

Michael Wong may refer to:

- Michael Wong (actor) (born 1965), also known as Michael Fitzgerald Wong or Wong Man-Tak, Hong Kong–based actor, director, producer and singer
- Michael Wong (singer) (born 1970), also known as Guang Liang, Taiwan-based Malaysian singer
- Mike Wong (born 1955), American born ice hockey player
- Michael Wong Wai-lun (born 1962), current Secretary for Development of Hong Kong

== See also ==
- Michael Wang (disambiguation)
