= Anthony Wong (disambiguation) =

Anthony Wong (born 1961) is a Hong Kong actor, screenwriter and film director.

Anthony Wong may also refer to:

- Anthony Brandon Wong (born 1965), Australian actor
- Anthony Wong Yiu-ming (born 1962), Hong Kong singer, composer and producer

== See also ==
- Tony Wong (disambiguation)
