= Elizabeth Wong =

Elizabeth Wong may refer to:

- Elizabeth Wong (author) (born 1937), writer and former civil servant and politician
- Elizabeth Wong (playwright) (born 1958), American playwright and writer
- Elizabeth Wong (politician) (born 1972), Malaysian politician
- Elizabeth Wong Keat Ping (born 1970), Malaysian politician
