= Andrea Wong =

American businesswoman

Andrea Wong is an American businesswoman who serves on the boards of Liberty Media Corporation, Roblox, and Hudson Pacific Properties. She is also serves on the Advisory Board of Workday and McLaren Racing.

== Career ==
Wong was most recently President, International Production for Sony Pictures Television and President, International for Sony Pictures Entertainment based in London. She oversaw Sony Pictures Television's 18 overseas production companies, creating 1,300 hours of entertainment around the world each year. Wong brought The Crown to Sony, winner of Golden Globes for Best Drama Television Series and Best Performance by an Actress in a Television Series and other accolades. As President, International for Sony Pictures Entertainment, Wong guided the company on matters impacting international production and championed the studio's interests abroad.

Previously, Wong served as president and CEO of Lifetime Networks, where she oversaw the day-to-day operations of Lifetime Television, Lifetime Movie Network, Lifetime Real Women, and Lifetime Digital, including programming, marketing, advertising sales, affiliate sales, public affairs, business and legal affairs, strategic planning, operations and research. During her time there she saw Army Wives become Lifetime's top-rated original series ever and spearheaded Lifetime's acquisition of Project Runway.

Prior to that, Wong was executive vice president, alternative programming, specials and late night at ABC where she developed shows such as The Bachelor, the U.S. version of Dancing With the Stars and the Emmy Award-winning Extreme Makeover: Home Edition.

Wong graduated MIT with a degree in electrical engineering and received an MBA from Stanford University. She is a Henry Crown Fellow at the Aspen Institute and a member of the Committee of 100. In addition she serves on the board of the Follicular Lymphoma Foundation and on the King’s Trust International 10th Anniversary Committee. She has also served on the Stanford Graduate School of Business Advisory Council, as a Trustee of the Royal Academy of Arts, and as a Governor of the British Film Institute.
