= David B. Wong =

American philosopher

David B. Wong is an American philosopher. He is the Susan Fox Beischer and George D. Beischer Professor of Philosophy at Duke University. Wong has done work in ethics, moral psychology, comparative ethics, and Chinese philosophy. He is known for his defense of a version of moral relativism.

Wong earned his Ph.D. from Princeton University in 1977 under the supervision of Gilbert Harman and his Bachelor of Arts degree from Macalester College in 1971.

He is the author of the book Natural Moralities: A Defense of Pluralistic Relativism, published in 2006.

== Writings ==
- Moral Relativity (1984), University of California Press.
- "Relativism", A Companion to Ethics (1991).
- Natural Moralities (October 2006), Oxford University Press, 2006 (Korean and Chinese translations in preparation).
- "Identifying with the Nonhuman in Early Daoism", Journal of Chinese Philosophy (accepted, 2009). Written for a symposium at Oxford University in June 2006, Topics in Comparative Ancient Philosophy: Greek and Chinese
- "Moral Ambivalence and Relativism", Relativism: A Compendium (accepted, 2009).
- "Cultural Pluralism and Moral Identity", Moral Self-Identity and Character (accepted, 2009).
- "Emotion and the Cognition of Reasons in Moral Motivation", Philosophical Issues (supplementary volume on metaethics to Nous) (accepted, 2009).
- "Translation of 'Zhuangzi and the Obsession with Being Right' into Chinese", Chinese Philosophy in the English-Speaking World (accepted, 2009).
