= Yee Hong Centre for Geriatric Care =

Senior care homes in Toronto

Coordinates: 43.8144°N 79.2901°W

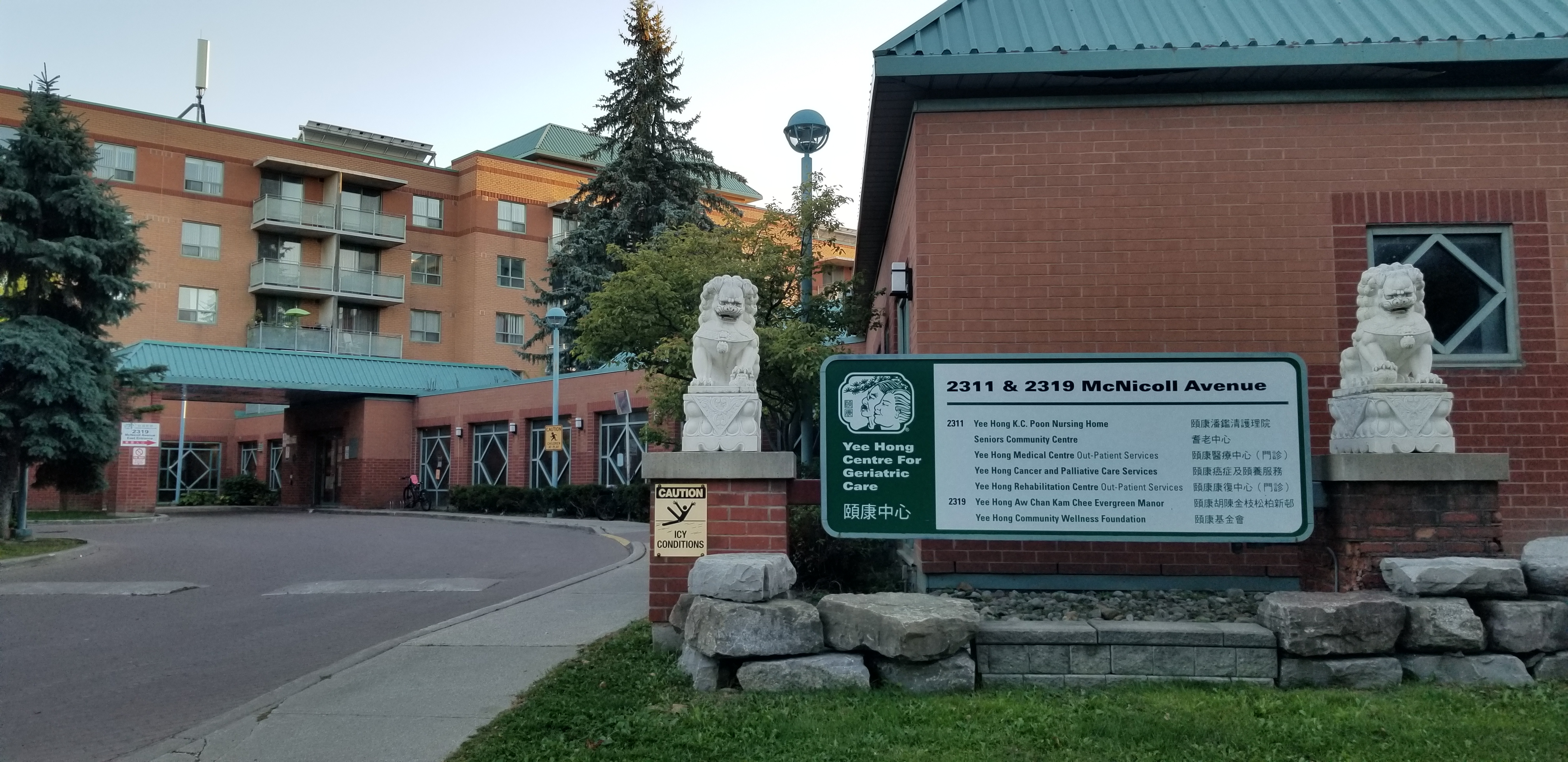
- Scarborough, Toronto, Markham, Mississauga, Ontario

Information
- Founded: 1994
- Language: Cantonese, English, Mandarin
- Website: www.yeehong.com

Yee Hong Centre for Geriatric Care
- Traditional Chinese: 頤康中心
- Simplified Chinese: 颐康中心
Transcriptions
Standard Mandarin
- Hanyu Pinyin: Yí Kāng Zhōngxīn

Chinese Community Nursing Home for Greater Toronto
- Traditional Chinese: 大多市華人護理安老院
- Simplified Chinese: 大多市华人护理安老院
Transcriptions
Standard Mandarin
- Hanyu Pinyin: Dàduō shì Huárén Hùlǐ Ānlǎoyuàn

The Yee Hong Centre for Geriatric Care, previously the Chinese Community Nursing Home for Greater Toronto, in Toronto, Ontario, Canada, is a residential community for senior citizens, particularly those unable to care for themselves.

== History ==
The Yee Hong Centre for Geriatric Care, formerly the Chinese Community Nursing Home for Greater Toronto, came about when Dr. Joseph Wong reportedly felt that there was a lack of emotional support and difficulty in communicating for Chinese seniors within mainstream medical facilities. In 1987, Dr. Wong, gathered a group of thirty Chinese Canadian friends who shared his vision of building a nursing home through grass-root fundraising effort.

The Yee Hong Centre was officially opened in October 1994. Located on a 4.2-acre (17,000 m^{2}) site in the heart of Scarborough's Chinese community, the first Centre at Scarborough McNicoll has a nursing home with a specialized Alzheimer's unit and long-term care facility that was honoured thrice as Grand Prize winner of the Ontario Long Term Care Association (OLTCA) Occupational Health and Safety Week Competition since 1997. The Centre includes a Seniors Community Centre which offers a number of social and daycare activities as well as community outreach, drop-in programs and meals-on-wheels. The Macrobian Club, Yee Hong's seniors social club which operates within the seniors community centre, received the Certificate of Recognition from the Board of Health of the City of Scarborough. One of the Centre's other accomplishments is the non-profit housing complex - the Aw Chan Kam Chee Evergreen Manor - featuring 130 apartments and 26 family townhouses. The Centre applied to the Canadian Council on Health Services Accreditation, and was awarded a three-year accreditation in June 1996, its 20th month of operation. It was awarded the Ontario Non-Profit Housing Association's Award for Excellence in 1997. In 2003, it marked the third consecutive time Yee Hong has been accredited by the Canadian Council on Health Services Accreditation. With 155 beds at present in Scarborough McNicoll, the K.C. Poon Nursing Home is also connected to a medical centre and a rehabilitation centre. All of the Centre's staff are fluently bilingual in both English and Chinese and are familiar with the traditions of the Chinese culture.

In November 1996, just two years after the Scarborough McNicoll's grand opening, an ambitious $6 million expansion campaign was launched to add two floors with 65 more beds to the existing nursing home and extra day care program space. It received funding approval for the additional long term care beds from the provincial government in 1998. The expansion was completed and the first resident, who had been on the waiting list since 1994, was admitted on June 14, 1999.

In December 1999 the Council awarded another three-year accreditation to the just expanded facility. It praised Yee Hong for providing "stellar care" to elderly members of the Chinese population in Scarborough, and stated that there were no recommendations suggested to improve the facility.

With the Expansion Campaign accomplished, Yee Hong has provided care to communities in other regions and to other seniors. In 1998 and 2001, the Ministry of Health awarded Yee Hong Centre a total of 715 bed licences, the largest such allocation to a non-profit organization in the history of Ontario.

The Yee Hong Centre Capital Campaign was embarked upon in April 1999 to build three new Yee Hong Centres with 200 beds each in Markham and Mississauga and 250 in the new Scarborough Finch centre. Yee Hong extended its services to non-Chinese seniors, particularly those of the South Asian, Filipino and Japanese communities. All three centres contain an Alzheimer unit. A child care centre will exist side by side with the senior day care centre in the Markham and Mississauga sites with their location in relatively young communities. The Scarborough Finch Centre will accommodate a 5-bed dialysis unit, the first one of its kind to be based in a nursing home. A separate 10-bed hospice care centre unit within the complex is being built.

In 2019, the provincial government approved an additional 800 beds for Yee Hong (256 beds in Markham, 320 beds in Mississauga and 224 beds in Scarborough).

== Locations ==
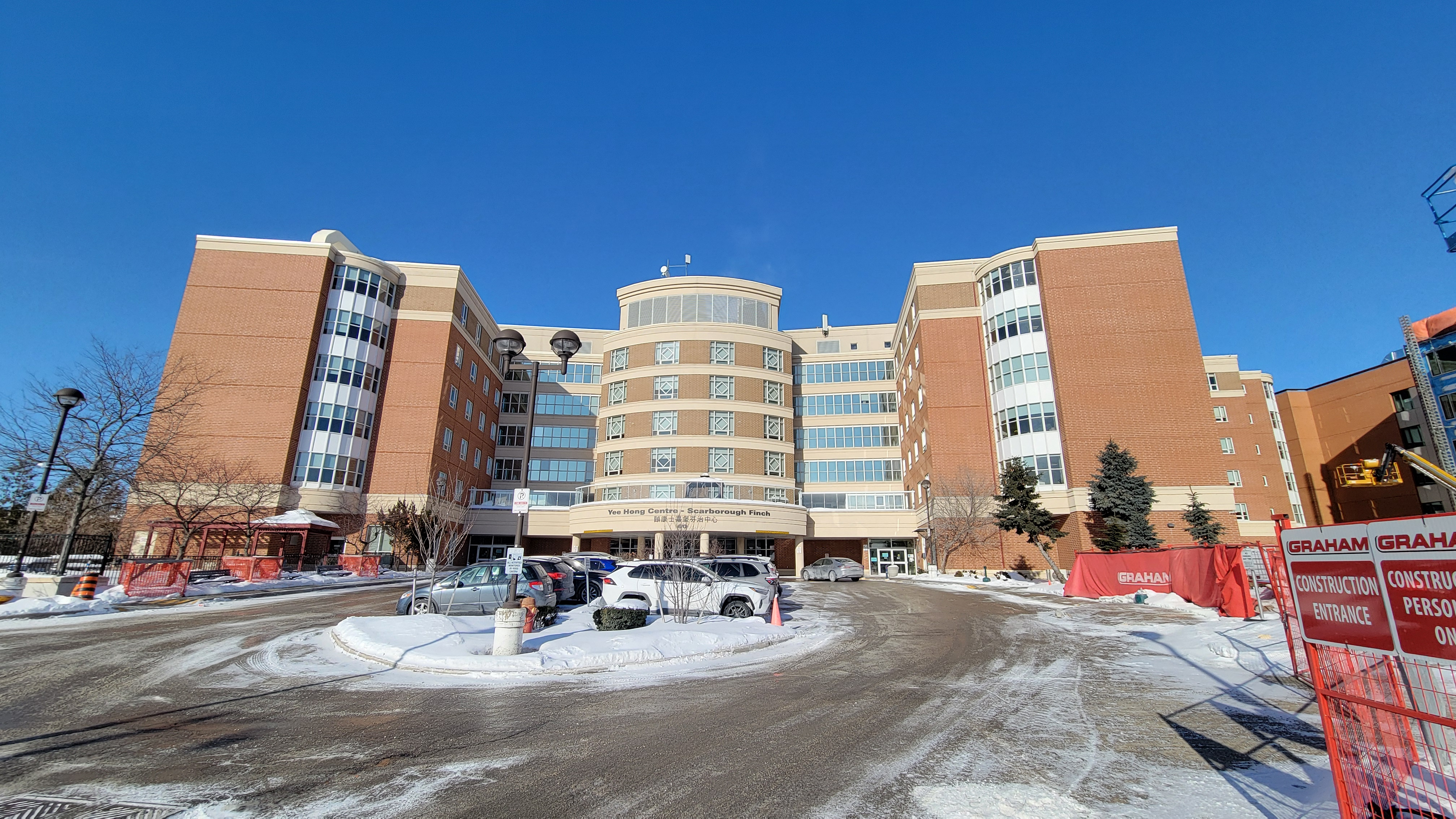
Scarborough Finch building

Scarborough McNicoll (Opened October 1994)
2311 McNicoll Avenue
Toronto, Ontario
155 beds

Markham (Opened 2002)
2780 Bur Oak Avenue
Markham, Ontario
200 beds
Mississauga (Opened October 2003)
5510 Mavis Road
Mississauga, Ontario
200 beds

Scarborough Finch (Opened 2004)
60 Scottfield Drive
Toronto, Ontario
250 beds
