= Linda Wong (pornographic film actress) =

American pornographic film actress

- Born: September 13, 1951
- Died: December 17, 1987 (aged 36)
- Other names: Sandy Stram; Linda Chang
- Occupation: Pornographic film actress

Linda Wong (September 13, 1951 – December 17, 1987) was an American pornographic film actress and one of the first Asian Americans to become a star in the American adult film industry. In 1999, she was inducted into the XRCO Hall of Fame.

== Early life ==
Wong was raised in San Francisco, California. She was a former homecoming queen and later went to college to earn a degree in dance. She worked as a ballerina and was married for a time to an attorney.

== Career ==
Wong began nude modeling and, after appearing in Hustler, was approached to do adult films. She first broke into the adult film business in 1976 with Oriental Babysitter and The Jade Pussycat, in which she co-starred with Georgina Spelvin and John Holmes. According to Playboy's October 1977 pictorial "Ladies of Joy" and Playboy's 1980 Girls of Playboy 4, she worked as a masseuse in Las Vegas for a short time under the name "Linda Ching".

In 1981, she decided to retire. She returned four years later to star in The Erotic World of Linda Wong. She was planning yet another comeback in 1987 when she died of a drug overdose.

== Awards ==
In 2011, Complex magazine ranked her at #25 in their list of "The Top 50 Hottest Asian Porn Stars of All Time."

== Partial filmography ==
- China Lust (1976)
- China DeSade (1977)
- Baby Face (1977)
- The Jade Pussycat (1977)
- Stormy (1980)
- Swedish Erotica 10 (1981)

== See also ==
- Golden Age of Porn
