= Jo Y. Wong =

Academic background
- Education: Tsinghua University (BS); Newcastle University (PhD)

Academic work
- Discipline: Mechanical engineering
- Sub-discipline: Terramechanics; Vehicle dynamics
- Institutions: Carleton University

Jo Y. Wong is a Chinese mechanical engineer who is a professor emeritus and distinguished research professor at Carleton University.

== Education ==
Wong earned a Bachelor of Science degree from Tsinghua University and a PhD from Newcastle University. In 1986, Newcastle University awarded him an honorary D.Sc. in recognition of his research achievements.

== Career ==
After earning his PhD, Wong joined the Faculty of Engineering at Carleton University in 1968. He has been a fellow of the Institution of Mechanical Engineers, the American Society of Mechanical Engineers, and the Canadian Society for Mechanical Engineering. Wong has been presented with numerous awards including the George Stephenson Prize from the Institution of Mechanical Engineers. Wong retired from the Department of Mechanical and Aerospace Engineering at Carleton University in 1999 and became Professor Emeritus and Distinguished Research Professor.

His book, Theory of Ground Vehicles, is a seminal work, is widely cited. Wong's research interests include terramechanics, off-Road vehicle mobility, road vehicle dynamics, computer simulation of vehicle systems, computer-aided methods for design evaluation of transport vehicles, air cushion technology, and advanced guided ground transportation systems.

The J.Y. and E.W. Wong Research Award in Mechanical/Aerospace Engineering is awarded annually, when merited, to outstanding full-time PhD candidates in either mechanical or aerospace engineering. The recipient must have demonstrated excellence in research with potentially significant impact on engineering practice.
