= Peter Wong (sports commentator) =

Hong Kong football commentator (born 1944)

Peter Wong 黃興桂
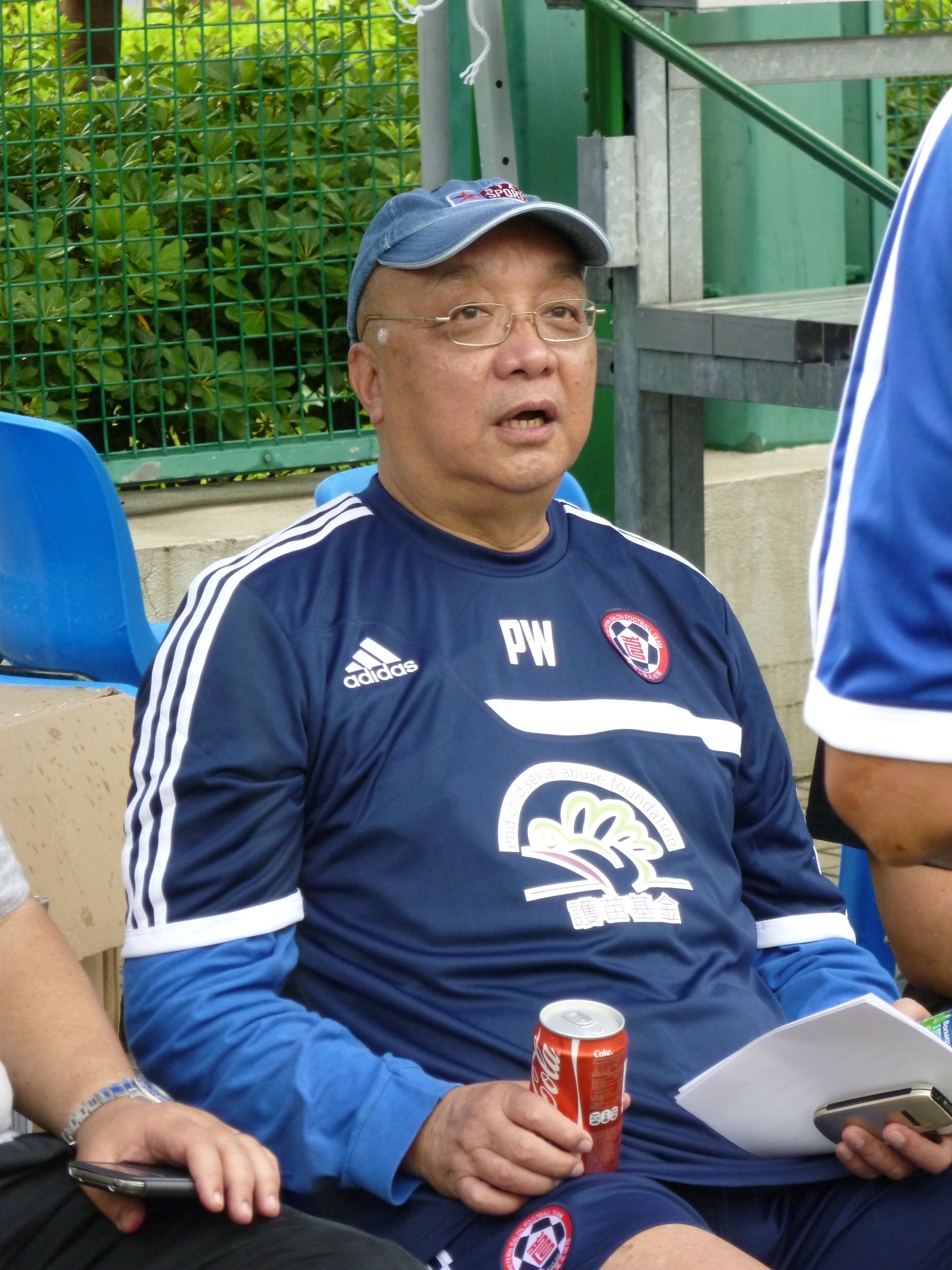

Personal information
- Birth name: Wong Hing Kwei
- Date of birth: February 26, 1944 (age 82)
- Place of birth: Hong Kong Occupied Territory

Managerial career
- Years: Team
- 1979–1982: Eastern
- 1982–1983: South China
- 1983–1988: Tsuen Wan
- 1988–1990: Eastern
- 2011–2013: Tsuen Wan

Peter Wong Hing Kwei (born 26 February 1944; Chinese: 黃興桂) is a Hong Kong sports commentator and former football manager. He is currently a director at Hong Kong Third Division club Tsuen Wan.

== Managerial career ==
Wong has served as head coach at Eastern, South China and Tsuen Wan. In the 1982-83 season, South China under Wong were relegated to Second Division, for the first time in the club's history and only exempted from relegation upon request to the Hong Kong Football Association.

== Punditry ==
Wong has also worked in ESPN in Singapore, and hosts a wide variety of Cantonese sports programmes, including football, basketball, baseball, American football, tennis and boxing.

He is famous for his odd catchphrases during programmes, such as:

There are only two possibilities for penalty: it's either going to go in or not.
Who're the best friends of goalkeepers in the match? Of course the posts and the bars are
Which team scores first in this match has a greater chance to win the match.
Gary Neville has 3 weaknesses: no pace, running slow, not fast enough.
This match can be put in the fridge now. (meaning the result is unlikely to change)

Such catchphrases are often use by other Cantonese-speaking sports commentators. He is a very controversial football commentator in Hong Kong, many find his commentating style to be senseless but he has also many supporters that think he is very entertaining. His catchphrases and quotes in his shows has once been quoted in an email on the internet, named "101 golden football quotes of Peter Wong", which was then widely circulated. He also teaches English, Spanish, French and Italian languages during a football match to Hong Kong audiences. His best partner is Simon Kong, with whom he has co-operated for 15 years in UEFA Champions League commentary.

He is described as a commentator, who integrates Latin and English styles of football commentary, together with local Hong Kong slang.

== Honours ==
Eastern

- Hong Kong Senior Shield: 1981–82

== Personal life ==
Despite his entertaining performance during programmes, Wong has experienced several tragedies in his life. His father, a Hong Kong tycoon, was kidnapped and killed in 1959. The kidnap case was known as the Three Wolves Case (三狼案) and is considered one of the most famous crimes in the Hong Kong history. His wife also died in a plane crash while travelling alone in the United States in 1982.

Wong is a Liverpool fan, as he wrote in one famous sentence: I tip Liverpool in feelings, but I tip Milan in sense, in a newspaper before the final of the 2005 UEFA Champions League. In addition, it can be obviously seen that Peter Wong is so excited during the commentary of Liverpool matches.

Wong is friendly with many celebrities as mentioned in his programmes. He often said that the legendary English football commentator, Martin Tyler is one of his mentors.
