= Joe Wong (comedian) =

Chinese American comedian (born 1970)

Joe Wong 黄西
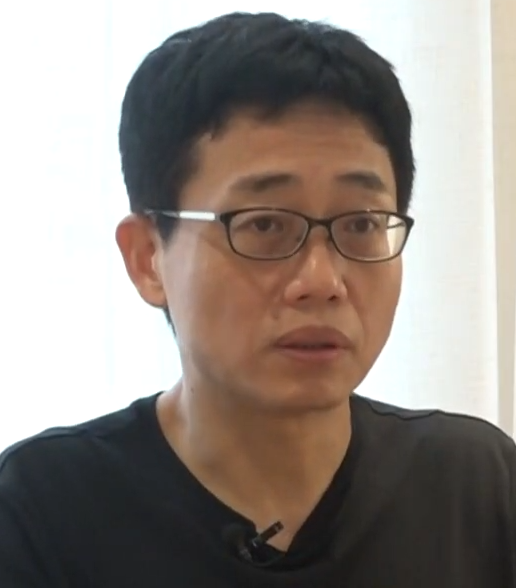
- Wong in October 2021
- Born: Huang Xi; February 16, 1970 (age 56); Baishan, Jilin, China
- Education: Jilin University (BS); Chinese Academy of Sciences (MS); Rice University (PhD)
- Notable work: 2010 Radio and Television Correspondents' Association dinner

Comedy career
- Years active: 2001 – Present
- Medium: Stand-up
- Genres: Deadpan, sarcasm, observational comedy, satire
- Subjects: pop culture, everyday life, marriage, self-deprecation, racial stereotypes
- Scientific career
- Fields: Biochemistry
- Workplaces: Rice University
- Thesis: The Drosophila inebriated/rosA transporter: Dual roles in the control of neuronal excitability and osmotic stress response (2000)
- Website: joewongcomedian.com

Joe Wong (Chinese: 黄西; pinyin: Huáng Xī; born February 16, 1970; academically known as Huang Xi) is a Chinese American comedian and former biochemistry researcher. He received a PhD degree in biochemistry from Rice University in 2000. He started his comedy career in Boston in 2001.

== Early life ==
Wong was born in the city of Baishan, Jilin, northeastern China, into an ethnic Korean family. His family had emigrated from Korea three generations previously. He graduated from Jilin University with a bachelor's degree and pursued a master's degree at the Chinese Academy of Sciences, before he went for doctoral studies in chemistry at Rice University in Texas in 1994. He graduated from Rice University in 2000 with a PhD in biochemistry. Wong's doctoral dissertation was titled "The Drosophila inebriated/rosA transporter: Dual roles in the control of neuronal excitability and osmotic stress response".

== Career ==
Wong moved to Boston in 2001 and began to perform his comedy at All Asia Bar, at Stash's Comedy Jam. Although he had won numerous awards, he did not attract American nationwide attention until after his appearance on Late Show with David Letterman on April 17, 2009. His multiple appearances on TV, courtesy of Ellen DeGeneres, boosted his reputation further. On February 10, 2010, Wong made his second appearance on the Late Show, and appeared again on March 30, 2012. He returned to the Late Show with Stephen Colbert on December 14, 2018.

On St. Patrick’s Day, 2010, he headlined the annual dinner hosted by the Radio and Television Correspondents' Association. On June 19, 2010, he placed first in the Third Annual Great American Comedy Festival.

In 2013, he moved back to Beijing, hosting television shows, such as Is it true? (Chinese: 是真的吗?), a MythBusters-like program, on China Central Television.

== Awards ==
Date	Title	Source
May 2003	Finalist at the Boston International Comedy and Film Festival	
March 2003	Best Short Film award at the Cambridge Fringe Fest	
	Six-time winner of Standup Comedy Contest at the Lizard Lounge in Cambridge, MA	
