= Joseph Yu Kai Wong =

Canadian physician and philanthropist

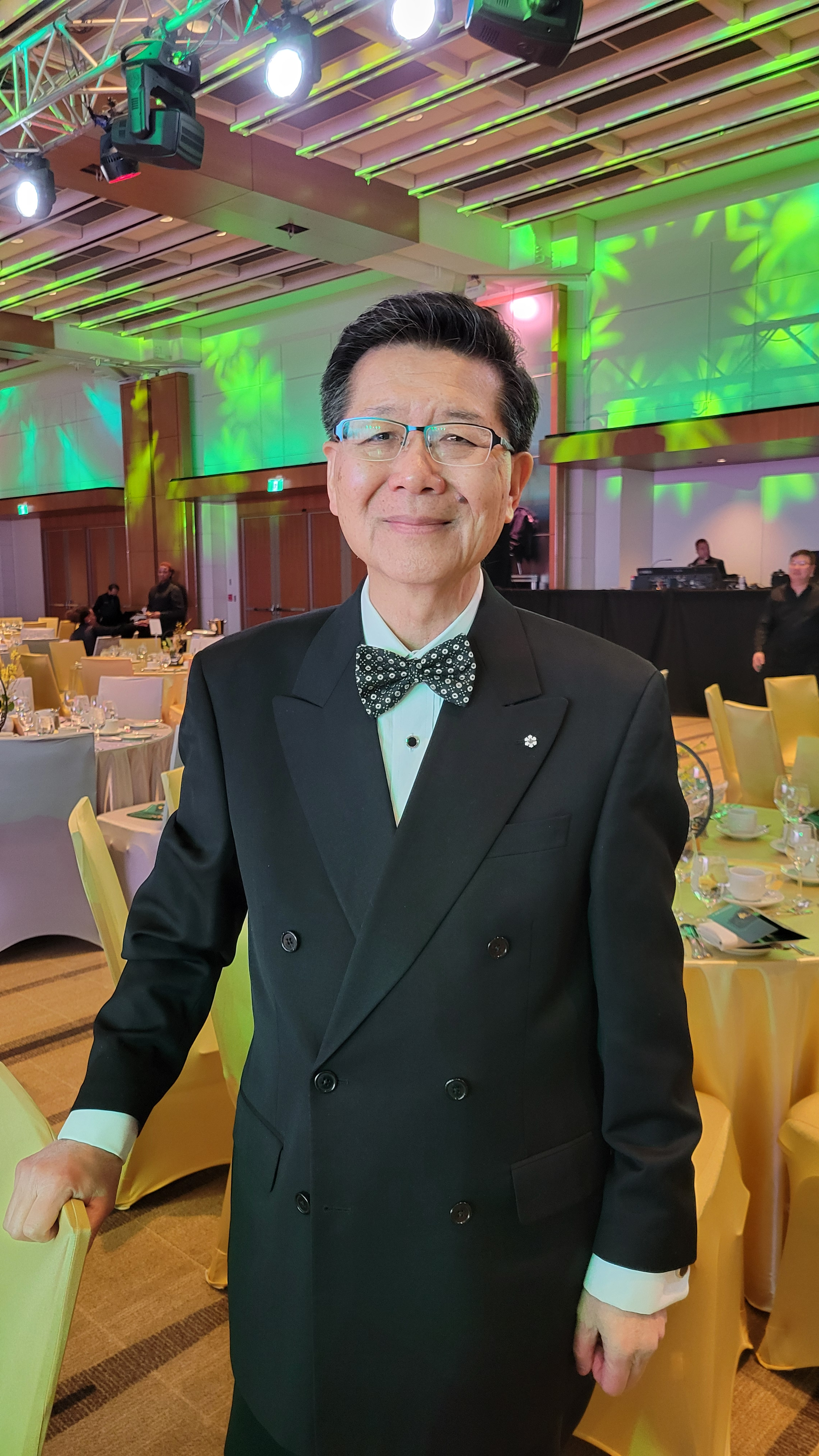
Dr. Joseph Yu Kai Wong in January 2025

Joseph Yu Kai Wong CM (Chinese: 王裕佳) is a Canadian physician and philanthropist. He founded the Yee Hong Centre for Geriatric Care in 1987. He served as the chairman for the United Way of Greater Toronto from 1990 to 1992 and has been honorary chair since 1994.

He was named Man of the Year in 1986 by the Toronto Star, and one of Toronto's most influential people in 1991 and 1992 by Toronto Life magazine. He was awarded the Order of Canada in 1993. Wong was the winner of the 2005 Power of Humanity award, presented to him by former Soviet Union President Mikhail Gorbachev. In 2014, he was named one of the 180 most influential people in Toronto's history by the Toronto Star for the city's 180th birthday, under the Community Builders category.

== Personal life ==
Wong came to Canada from Hong Kong to study medicine at McGill University, but he studied electrical engineering due to restrictions to foreign students. He later studied medicine at Albert Einstein College of Medicine at Yeshiva University in New York City and returned to Canada after graduation.

A practicing family doctor in Toronto, Wong is a married father of two sons.

== Social activism ==
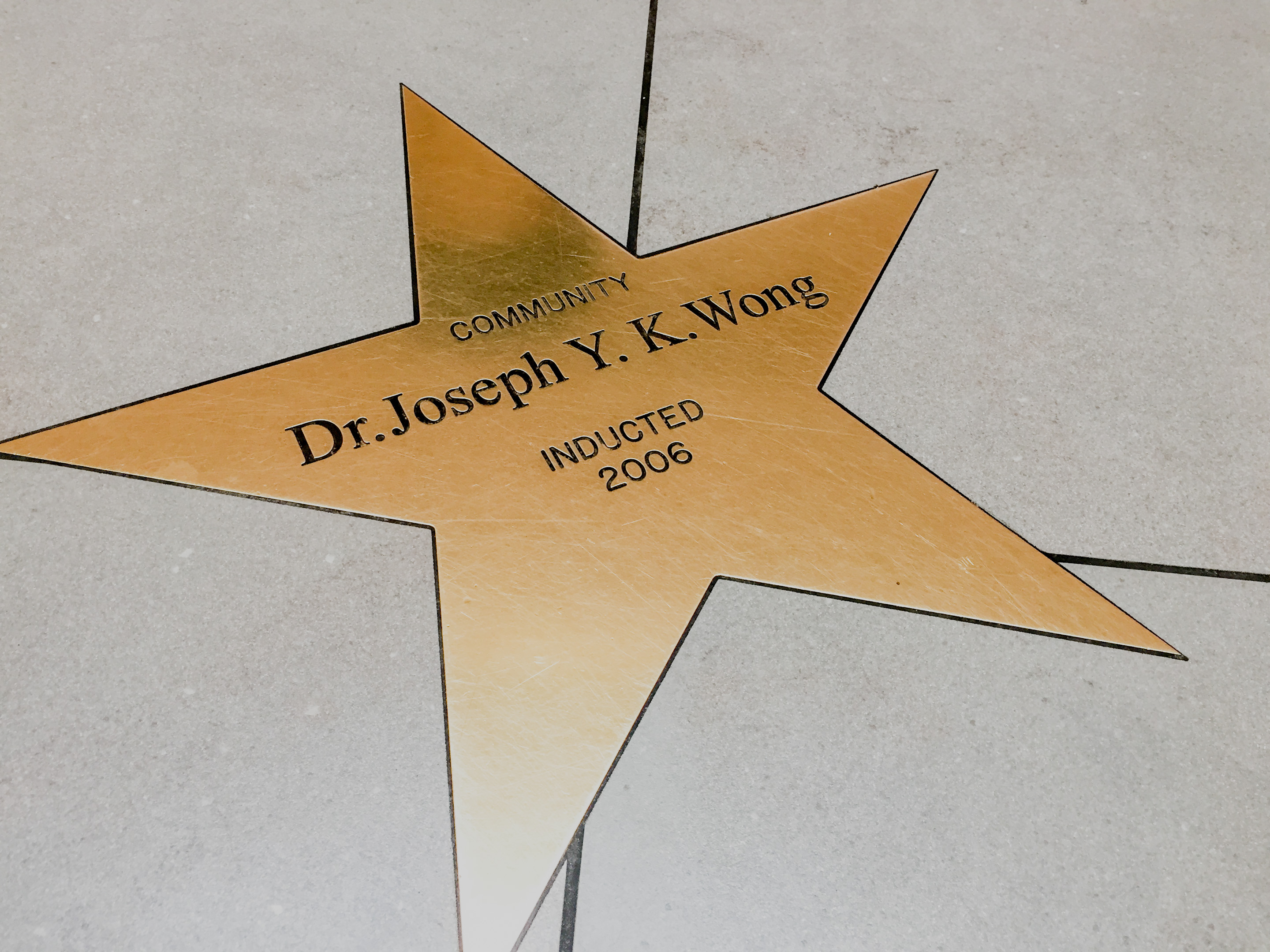
Dr. Wong's star on the City of Toronto's Scarborough Walk of Fame

Wong became interested in social activism after viewing the "Campus Giveaway" report by CTV's W5, as he felt the report inaccurately portrayed Canadian university students of Chinese descent by depicting them as undeserving foreign students. This event prompted Wong to help found the Chinese Canadian National Council and serve as its first president. Wong also helped to campaign for the redress of the discriminatory Head Tax applied to Chinese labourers entering Canada from the late 19th century to 1947.

As a board member of the United Way of Greater Toronto, Wong helped to change the organization's image by enlisting the city's Chinese community to hold their first-ever fundraising Walkathon in 1983. He later served as chair of the board and remains an honorary chair.

Wong founded the Yee Hong Centre for Geriatric Care in 1987 for Chinese seniors living in the Toronto area.

Wong is also the founder and chair of the Association for Learning and Preserving the History of World War II in Asia in Toronto (Toronto ALPHA). His work with Toronto ALPHA has led to the province of Ontario to become the first jurisdiction in the western world to include the history of the Second World War in Asia in the high school curriculum.

He was awarded with a key to the City of Toronto on February 19, 2026 by mayor Olivia Chow for his "lifelong commitment to advocacy, his philanthropy, and commitment to multiculturalism, refugees, and seniors."

== ALPHA Education ==
In 1997 Wong founded Alpha Education, a Toronto-based NGO that focuses on educating individuals on the overlooked events of World War II in Asia. In particular, ALPHA emphasizes the values of justice, peace, and reconciliation with respect to the atrocities committed by the Imperial Japanese Army during the time. The organization fulfills its mission through its "four directions": educating educators and students, empowering youth, supporting research, and connecting with the community. Its current projects include the sorting, transcribing, analyzing, and annotating a large collection of primary sources related to World War II in Asia, and material includes images, videos, interviews, and official documents, as well as the creation of ALPHA Education University Chapters, which work to extend ALPHA's mission across Ontario.

It has participated in several events, which include a parliamentary motion by federal parties in Ottawa to pass a motion to recognize Japan's use of sex slaves during World War II, the production of Iris Chang's the Rape of Nanking, the Memorandum of Understanding, and the support of Private Member's Bill #79, an Act to proclaim the Nanjing Massacre Commemorative Day.

== See also ==
- Chinese Canadian National Council
- Order of Canada
