= List of Pi Beta Phi members =

The list of Pi Beta Phi is an international women's fraternity founded at Monmouth College, in Monmouth, Illinois, on April 28, 1867, as I. C. Sorosis. It was the first national secret college society of women to be modeled after men's Greek-letter fraternities. The following is a list of some of the fraternity's notable members, commonly referred to as Pi Phis.

== Advocacy and service ==
Nam	Chapter	Notability	Ref.
Iris Calderhead	Kansas Alpha	Suffragist and member of the National Woman's Party	
Carrie Chapman Catt	Iowa Gamma	Founder of the League of Women Voters	
Julia Compton Moore	North Carolina Alpha	Took care of the families of the 1/7th Cavalry during the Vietnam War, depicted in the film We Were Soldiers by Madeleine Stowe	
Eleanor Smith Morrison	Texas Beta	11th National Commissioner of the Boy Scouts of America	
Madge Oberholtzer	Indiana Gamma	Literacy advocate and manager of the Young People’s Reading Circle, a division of the Department of Public Instruction at the Indiana State House, whose deathbed testimony regarding her kidnapping and rape by the Grand Dragon of the Indiana Klan helped bring down the Ku Klux Klan	
Anna Kelton Wiley	D.C. Alpha	Suffragist, chairman of the National Woman’s Party, and editor of Equal Rights	

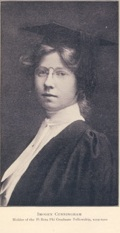
Imogen Cunningham, 1909

== Arts ==
Name	Chapter	Notability	Ref.
Imogen Cunningham	Washington Alpha	Pioneer in the field of photography	

== Entertainment ==
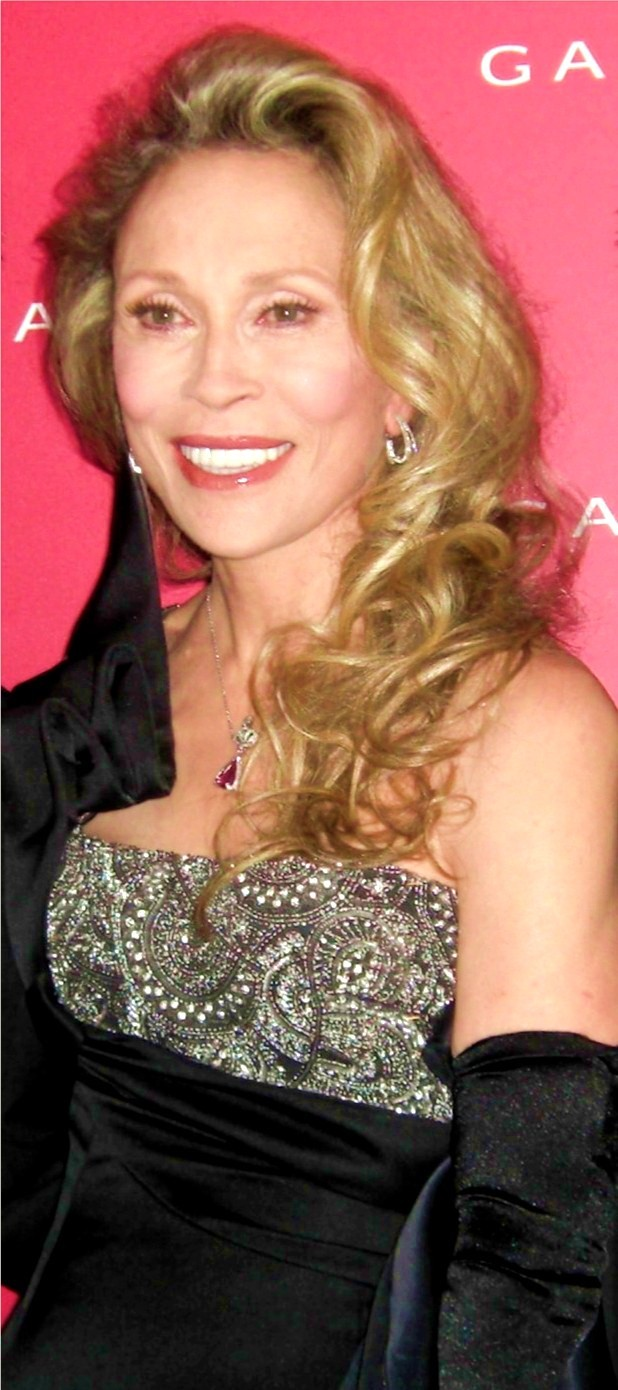
Faye Dunaway

Name	Chapter	Notability	Ref.
Susan Akin	Mississippi Beta	1986 Miss America	
Mary Katherine Campbell	Ohio Beta	1922 and 1923 Miss America	
Ann Turner Cook	Texas Beta	Child model; original Gerber baby featured in advertisements	
Jenna Dewan	California Gamma	Actress and dancer, played Nora in the 2006 film Step Up	
Ree Drummond	California Gamma	Television personality and blogger for "The Pioneer Woman," bestselling author, food writer, and photographer	
Faye Dunaway	Florida Beta	Academy Award-winning actress	
Katelyn Epperly	Illinois Eta	American Idol, finalist	
Lauren Froderman	California Nu	So You Think You Can Dance, season 7 winner	
Jennifer Garner	Ohio Eta	Golden Globe-winning actress/producer	
Kathy Garver	California Delta	Actress and producer, known for her role as Catherine "Cissy" Davis on Family Affair	
Courtney Gibbs	Texas Delta	1988 Miss USA	
Savannah Guthrie	Arizona Alpha	Co-anchor of the NBC News morning show Today	
Mallory Hagan	Alabama Gamma	2013 Miss America	
Marilyn Horne	California Gamma	Opera singer	
Traylor Howard	Florida Beta	Actress, known for her role as Natalie Teeger on Monk	
Nancy Kulp	Florida Beta	Actress, known for her work on The Beverly Hillbillies	
Stella Lefty	Louisiana Alpha	Singer-songwriter	
Jacquelyn Mayer	Illinois Epsilon	1963 Miss America	
Patricia Neal	Illinois Epsilon	Academy Award-winning actress	
Christine Romans	Iowa Gamma	Chief business correspondent for NBC News, presenter on Current with Christine Romans on NBC News Now; previously the chief business correspondent and anchor for CNN's Early Start	
Tram-Anh Tran	Pennsylvania Epsilon	Actress, known for her role as Tina Nguyen on the children's television series Ghostwriter	
Margaret Truman	D.C. Alpha	Soprano and daughter of President Harry S. Truman	
Marilyn Van Derbur	Colorado Alpha	Motivational speaker and the 1958 Miss America. Named Outstanding Woman Speaker in America and the first woman to win the Speakers' Hall of Fame Award in 1980	

== Law and law enforcement ==
Name	Chapter	Notability	Ref.
Cate Edwards	New Jersey Alpha	attorney, daughter of John Edwards and Elizabeth Edwards	
Valerie Plame	Pennsylvania Epsilon	Covert CIA officer, central figure in the Plame affair	
Linda Copple Trout	Idaho Alpha	former chief justice of the Idaho Supreme Court	

== Literature and journalism ==
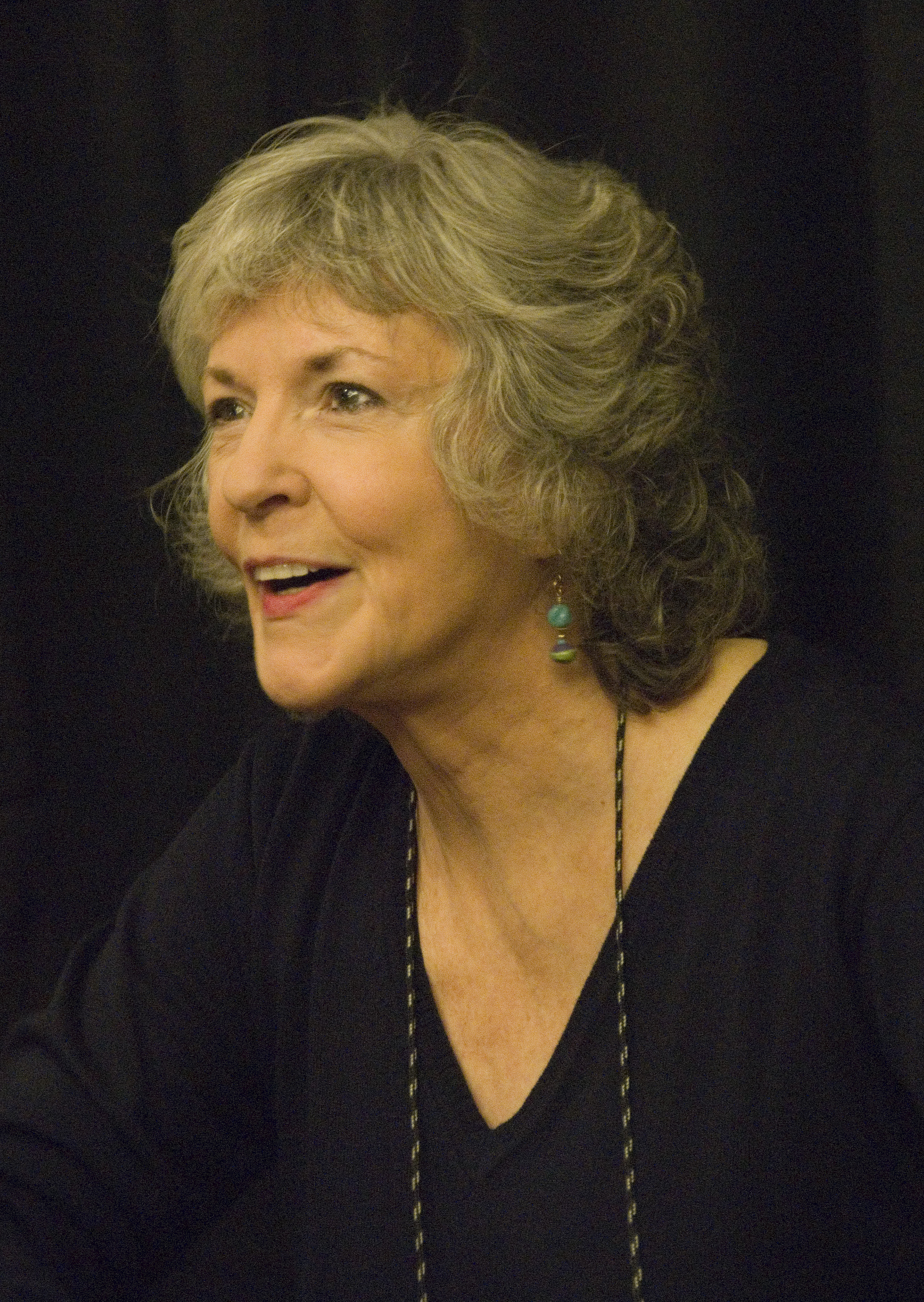
Sue Grafton

Name	Chapter	Notability	Ref.
Lee Ann Colacioppo		Editor of The Denver Post	
Moira Forbes	New Jersey Alpha	Publisher of ForbesLife Executive Women	
Sue Grafton	Kentucky Alpha	Mystery novelist	
Jen Lancaster	Indiana Eta	Author and blogger	
Jane Tunstall Lingo	D.C. Alpha	Journalist, first women invited to join the National Press Club	
Patricia MacLachlan	Connecticut Alpha	Author of Sarah, Plain and Tall and recipient of the Newbery Medal for her contribution to children's literature	
Jia Tolentino	Virginia Epsilon	Staff writer for The New Yorker	
Margaret Truman	DC Alpha	Daughter of U.S. President Harry Truman and author	

== Politics ==
Name	Chapter	Notability	Ref.
Eugenia Moore Anderson	Iowa Beta	U.S. Ambassador to Denmark and U.S. Ambassador to Bulgaria	
Laurie Monnes Anderson	Oregon Gamma	Oregon State Senate	
Virginia Murphy Blankenbaker	Indiana Delta	Indiana Senate	
Barbara Bush	Texas Eta Alumna Initiate 2003	41st First Lady of the United States and wife of George H. W. Bush	
Grace Goodhue Coolidge	Vermont Beta	First Lady of the United States and wife of Calvin Coolidge	
Kay Bailey Hutchison	Texas Alpha	United States Senate	
Maggie Kernan	Indiana Delta	First Lady of Indiana	
Lisa Murkowski	Oregon Gamma	United States Senate	
Jenonne Walker	Oklahoma Alpha	U.S. Ambassador to the Czech Republic	

== Science and medicine ==
Name	Chapter	Notability	Ref.
Leona Baumgartner	Kansas Alpha	Physician, first woman to serve as commissioner of the New York City Department of Health	
Janice M. Benario	Maryland Alpha	Cryptanalyst with the United States Navy (WAVES) on the Enigma program during World War II, professor emerita of modern and classical languages at Georgia State University	
Jenette H. Bolles	Kansas and Colorado Pi Beta Phi	First woman osteopath	
Anna Lee Fisher	California Epsilon	Astronaut and NASA, physician	
Elizebeth Smith Friedman	Michigan Alpha	cryptanalyst who deciphered enemy codes in both World Wars and helped to solve cases for the United States Department of the Treasury, the United States Coast Guard, the United States Navy, the United States Army and the International Monetary Fund	
Kathryn Stephenson	Nebraska Beta and Arizona Alpha	First female American board-certified plastic surgeon	

== Sports ==
Name	Chapter	Notability	Ref.
Jayne Appel	California Alpha	Retired WNBA Basketball player; selected with the 5th overall pick in 2010 to the San Antonio Silver Stars	
Zoe Atkin	Stanford	Olympic freestyle skier	
Erin Cafaro	California Beta	Rower; two-time gold medalist in the women's eight at the 2008 and 2012 Summer Olympics	
Kaleigh Gilchrist	California Gamma	Olympic gold medalist in water polo at the 2016 and 2020 Summer Olympics; 2013 NCAA National Champion	
Kaye Hall	Washington Gamma	Swimmer; two-time Olympic champion and former world record-holder in two events	
Nancy Hogshead-Makar	North Carolina Beta	Winner of three gold medals and one silver medal in swimming at the 1984 Summer Olympics	
Kelli Kuehne	Texas Alpha	Retired professional golfer; winner of the 1999 LPGA Corning Classic	
Tracie Ruiz	Arizona Alpha	Winner of two gold medals in synchronized swimming at the 1984 Summer Olympics	
Brita Sigourney	California Theta	Winner of a bronze medal in freestyle skiing at the 2018 Winter Olympics, three-time Olympian, three-time X Games medalist, and the first woman to land a 1080 in a competition halfpipe run	

== See also ==
- List of Pi Beta Phi chapters
