= Michael Caine (disambiguation) =

Michael Caine (born 1933) is a British film actor.

Michael Caine may also refer to:

- Michael Caine (racing driver) (born 1969), British auto racing driver
- Michael Harris Caine (1927–1999), British businessman
- "Michael Caine" (song), a song by Madness

== See also ==
- Michael Caines, English chef
- Michael Cain (disambiguation)
- Michael Kane (disambiguation)
