= Lee Ann Colacioppo =

American journalist

Lee Ann Fleet Colacioppo
- Other name: Lee Ann Fleet
- Education: Drake University (B.A.)
- Occupations: Journalist, editor
- Title: Editor of The Denver Post
- Predecessor: Gregory L. Moore

Lee Ann Fleet Colacioppo is an American journalist and the editor of The Denver Post. She became the editor of the newspaper in 2016, succeeding Gregory L. Moore.

== Life and career ==
Colacioppo received a B.A. from Drake University in 1986.

Colacioppo worked at publications including The Des Moines Register, The Greenville News, and Kingsport Times-News, before starting at The Denver Post in 1999 as an assistant city editor. She went on to work in positions including city editor, investigations editor, and news director. She played a leading role in the newspaper's coverage of the 2012 Aurora theater shooting, which was awarded the Pulitzer Prize for Breaking News Reporting the following year, in 2013.

In 2016, Colacioppo became the editor of The Denver Post. She succeeded Gregory L. Moore, who was the editor from 2012 to 2016. She is the first female editor of the publication. In 2018, Colacioppo joined the editorial board of The Denver Post. She oversaw The Denver Post laying off a third of its employees in 2018 and removing its online comment section in 2023.

She is married to Joe Colacioppo, a teacher.
