= Michael Kane =

Michael Kane may refer to:

- Mike Kane (born 1969), British Labour MP
- Michael F. Kane (born 1967), member of the Massachusetts House of Representatives
- Michael N. Kane (1851–1924), American lawyer, judge, and politician from New York.
- Michael Kane (actor) (1922–2007), Canadian actor
- Michael Kane (writer), American writer and journalist for several publications
- Michael Kane, the protagonist of the Old Mars novels by Michael Moorcock

== See also ==
- Michael Cain (disambiguation)
- Michael Caine (born 1933), actor
- Michael Caines (born 1969), chef
