= Michael Kane (writer) =

American writer and journalist

Michael Kane is an American writer and journalist. He is currently the entertainment features writer for the New York Post. In 2009 he wrote a book published by Viking Press called GAME BOYS: PROFESSIONAL VIDEOGAMING'S RISE FROM THE BASEMENT TO THE BIG TIME, which details the American professional Counter-Strike community.

Kane was a sports writer and editor at the Denver Post. His work has appeared in ESPN Magazine, and Sport Magazine.
