= Michael Cain =

Michael Cain may refer to:

- Michael Cain (musician), pianist and composer
- Michael Cain (footballer), English footballer
- Mick Cain, New Zealand rugby union player

== See also ==
- Michael Caine, English actor
- Michael Kane (disambiguation)
