= Anna Kelton Wiley =

American suffragist and clubwoman (1877–1964)

President of the National Woman's Party
- In office 1930–1932
- In office 1940–1942

Personal details
- Born: Anna Kelton; March 8, 1877 Oakland, California, U.S.
- Died: January 6, 1964 (aged 86) Washington, D.C., U.S.
- Resting place: Arlington National Cemetery
- Spouse: Harvey Washington Wiley
- Parent: John Cunningham Kelton
- Education: Columbia University, B.S.
- Occupation: Library clerk
- Profession: Suffragist and clubwoman

Anna Kelton Wiley (March 8, 1877 – January 6, 1964) was an American suffragist, civil servant, and clubwoman. She was chairman of the National Woman's Party and editor of Equal Rights. Wiley served on board of directors of the General Federation of Women's Clubs for 22 years. She was married to Harvey Washington Wiley, chief chemist in the United States Department of Agriculture who was responsible for the Pure Food and Drug Act of 1906.

== Early life ==
Kelton was born in Oakland, California on March 8, 1877. Her parents were Josephine and John Cunningham Kelton, a Brigadier General in the Civil War. When she was five years old, her family moved to Washingotn, D.C., where her father was an adjutant general with the United States Army.

Kelton attended Central High School in Washington, D.C., graduating in 1894. She won the Kendall Scholarship to attend Columbia University (now George Washington University). While there, she joined Pi Beta Phi women's fraternity on January 5, 1895. Wiley graduated with a B.S. degree in 1897. She won the Sterrett Medal in physics.

Kelton enrolled in the Washington College of Law in 1910, planning to become a lawyer; however, she did not graduate.

== Career ==
Starting in 1898, Kelton worked as the secretary of physician and chemist Harvey Washington Wiley, chief chemist in the United States Department of Agriculture for two years. When he went to Paris to represent the United States at the Exposition Universelle in 1900, she transferred to the United States Copyright Office at the Library of Congress, where she was a library clerk for ten years.

Although she planned on becoming a lawyer, Wiley was distracted from that goal by her greater interest in suffrage and social improvement. Wiley joined other suffragists in picketing the White House in 1917; she was arrested for obstructing traffic and spent five days in district jail in November 1917. After appealing her sentence and refusing to pay the fine, she spent fifteen days in district jail so that so that suffragist Elizabeth McShane would not have to go alone.

Wiley was the chairman of the National Woman's Party from 1930 to 1932 and 1940 to 1942. She was editor of Equal Rights, the magazine of the National Woman's Party, from 1940 to 1945. When she was 77 years old, Wiley worked for the passage of the Equal Rights Amendment. She convinced the General Federation of Women's Clubs to endorse the Equal Rights Amendment. She continued to be politically active until four years before her death.

== Honors ==
Wiley received an honorary Master of Arts degree from Hanover College in Madison, Indiana for her work with the American Pure Food League. The Women's City Club of Washington, D.C. dedicated its Anna Kelton Wiley Room in 1948.

== Personal life ==
In 1910, Kelton reconnected with Dr. Harvey Washington Wiley. They became engaged in December 1910 and were married on February 27, 1911, in Washington, D.C. She was 33 and he was 66. Dr. Wiley was a Civil War veteran and successfully led efforts for the Pure Food and Drug Act of 1906, earning the nickname "Father of the Pure Food Act". Their marriage was celebrated at a luncheon held by the Elizabeth Cady Stanton Suffrage Club. The couple had two sons, Harvey Wiley Jr. and James Wiley.

After Dr. Wiley died in 1930, she invited two German refugee women to live in her home at 2345 Ashmeade Place N.W. in Washington, D.C. She also continued her fight for pure food, serving as president of the American Pure Food League.

Wiley served in a leadership role in more than forty organizations, including being president of twelve. She belonged to the Columbia Women, the D.C. Federation of Women's Clubs, the Kalorama Citizens Association, the National League of American Pen Women, the 20th Century Club, and the Washington Hearing Society. She was active in the D.C. Alumnae Club of Pi Beta Phi. Dr. and Mrs. Wiley hosted a reception at the Library of Congress for more than 1,100 of her sorority sisters when Pi Beta Phi met in Washington, D.C. in 1924 to present a portrait of First Lady Grace Goodhue Coolidge to the United States.

Wiley was a member of the Women's City Club of Washington, D.C. and the Major L’Enfant Chapter of the Daughters of the American Revolution. After the City Club became a member of the General Federation of Women's Clubs (GFWC), she served on the GFWC board of directors for 22 years and attended all of its conventions, including one in California in 1959 when she was 82. At the time, she was serving her second term as president of the Women's City Club of Washington, D.C., having previously served in this capacity from 1936 to 1938.

Wiley died in Washington, D.C., at the age of 85 on January 6, 1964. Her funeral services were held at St. Margaret's Episcopal Church. She was buried with her husband in Arlington National Cemetery.
