= The Denver Post =

American daily newspaper in Colorado

- The May 2, 2011 front page of The Denver Post, with headline reporting the killing of Osama bin Laden
- Type: Daily newspaper
- Format: Broadsheet
- Owner: MediaNews Group
- Editor: Lee Ann Colacioppo
- Opinion editor: Megan Schrader
- Founded: 1892; 134 years ago
- Headquarters: North Washington, Colorado
- Country: United States
- Circulation: 24,300 Average print circulation
- ISSN: 1930-2193
- OCLC number: 8789877
- Website: denverpost.com

The Denver Post is a daily newspaper and website published in the Denver metropolitan area. In 2016, its website received roughly six million monthly unique visitors generating more than 13 million page views, according to comScore.

== Ownership ==
The Post was the flagship newspaper of MediaNews Group Inc., founded in 1983 by William Dean Singleton and Richard Scudder. On December 1, 1987, MediaNews, a national newspaper chain with over 60 daily newspapers and over 160 non-daily publications in 13 states, bought The Denver Post from Times Mirror Company.

Since 2010, The Denver Post has been owned by hedge fund Alden Global Capital, which acquired its bankrupt parent company, MediaNews Group. In April 2018, a group called "Together for Colorado Springs" said that it was raising money to buy the Post from Alden Global Capital, stating: "Denver deserves a newspaper owner who supports its newsroom."

== History ==
=== 19th century ===
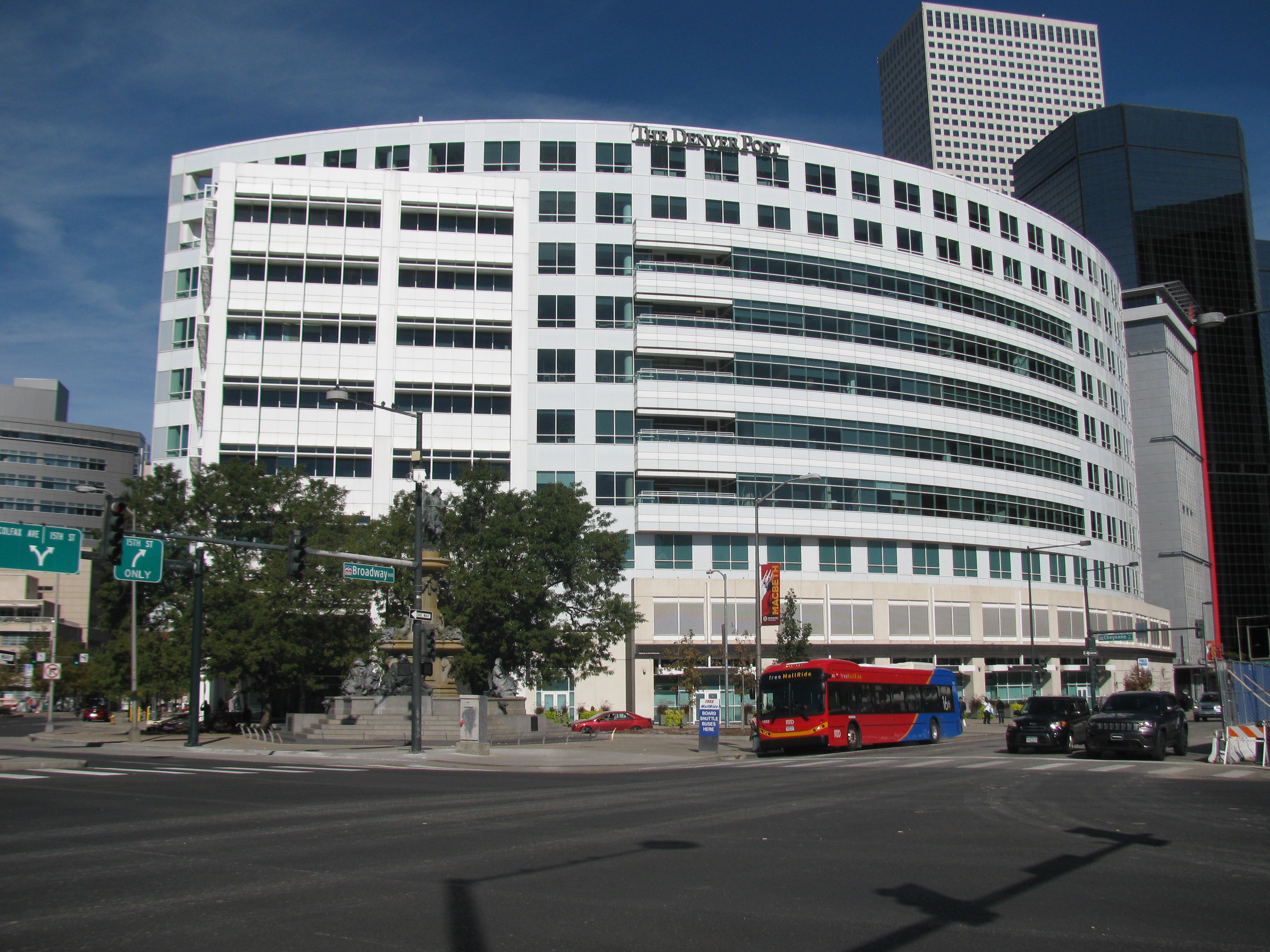
The newspaper's former building and newsroom in downtown Denver

In August 1892, The Evening Post was founded by supporters of Grover Cleveland with $50,000. It was a Democratic paper used to publicize political ideals and stem the number of Colorado Democrats leaving the party. Cleveland had been nominated for president because of his reputation for honest government.

However, Cleveland and eastern Democrats opposed government purchase of silver, Colorado's most important product, which made Cleveland unpopular in the state. Following the bust of silver prices in 1893, the country and Colorado went into a depression and The Evening Post suspended publication in August 1893.

A new group of owners with similar political ambitions raised $100,000 and resurrected the paper in June 1894. On October 28, 1895, Harry Heye Tammen, former bartender and owner of a curio and souvenir shop, and Frederick Gilmer Bonfils, a Kansas City real estate and lottery operator, purchased the Evening Post for $12,500. Neither had newspaper experience, but they were adept at the business of promotion and finding out what people wanted to read.

Through the use of sensationalism, editorialism, and "flamboyant circus journalism", a new era began for the Post. Circulation grew and eventually passed the other three daily papers combined. On November 3, 1895 the paper's was name changed to Denver Evening Post.

=== 20th century ===
On January 1, 1901 the word "Evening" was dropped from the name and the paper became The Denver Post.

Post reporters include Gene Fowler, Frances Belford Wayne, and "sob sister" Polly Pry. Damon Runyon worked briefly for the Post in 1905–1906 before gaining fame as a writer in New York.

After the deaths of Tammen and Bonfils in 1924 and 1933, Helen Bonfils and May Bonfils Stanton, Bonfils' daughters, became the principal owners of the Post. In 1946, the Post hired Palmer Hoyt from the Portland Oregonian to become editor and publisher of the Post and to give the paper a new direction. With Hoyt in charge, news was reported fairly and accurately. He took editorial comment out of the stories and put it on an editorial page. He called the page The Open Forum and it continues today.

In 1960, there was a takeover attempt by publishing mogul Samuel I. Newhouse. Helen Bonfils brought in her friend and lawyer Donald Seawell to save the paper. The fight led to a series of lawsuits as Post management struggled to maintain local ownership. It lasted 13 years and drained the paper financially. When Helen Bonfils died in 1972, Seawell was named president and chairman of the board. He was also head of the Denver Center for the Performing Arts (DCPA). The Center was established and financed primarily by the Frederick G. and Helen G. Bonfils foundations, with aid from city funds. The majority of the assets of the foundations came from Post stock dividends.

By 1980, the paper was losing money. Critics accused Seawell of being preoccupied with building up the DCPA. Seawell sold the Post to the Los Angeles-based Times Mirror Company for $95 million. Proceeds went to the Bonfils Foundation, securing the financial future of the DCPA. Times Mirror started morning publication and delivery. Circulation improved, but the paper did not perform as well as required. Times Mirror sold The Denver Post to Dean Singleton and MediaNews Group in 1987.

=== 21st century ===
In January 2001, MediaNews and E.W. Scripps, parent company of the now defunct Rocky Mountain News, entered into a joint operating agreement (JOA), creating the Denver Newspaper Agency, which combined the business operations of the former rivals. Under the agreement, the newsrooms of the two newspapers agreed to publish separate morning editions Monday through Friday, with the Post retaining a broadsheet format and the News using a tabloid format.

They published a joint broadsheet newspaper on Saturday, produced by the News staff, and a broadsheet on Sunday, produced by the Post staff. Both newspapers' editorial pages appeared in both weekend papers. The JOA ended on February 27, 2009, when the Rocky Mountain News published its last issue. The following day, the Post published its first Saturday issue since 2001.

The Post launched a staff expansion program in 2001, but declining advertising revenue led to a reduction of the newsroom staff in 2006, 2007, and 2016 through layoffs, early-retirement packages, voluntary-separation buyouts and attrition.

In 2013, just before legalization in Colorado, The Denver Post initiated an online media brand The Cannabist to cover cannabis-related issues. First led by Editor in Chief Ricardo Baca, the online publication has surged in popularity, beating the industry veteran High Times in September 2016. Thirty layoffs were announced for The Post in March 2018, according to the Denver Business Journal.

==== Management by Digital First Media ====
On September 7, 2011, John Paton, CEO of Journal Register Company, was appointed CEO of MediaNews Group, replacing Singleton, who stayed on as the Post's publisher and CEO of MediaNews until his retirement in 2013. He remains non-executive chairman of the organization. With the move, the Post also entered into an agreement with the newly created Digital First Media, led by Paton, that would provide management services and lead the execution of the company's business strategy in conjunction with Journal Register. Paton stepped down as CEO of Digital First in June 2015, and was succeeded by longtime MediaNews executive Steve Rossi.

In the same announcement, the company said that it would no longer be seeking a sale.

In 2017, The Denver Post announced that its headquarters were moving to its printing plant in North Washington in Adams County, Colorado.

==== Newsroom cuts and criticism ====
The operation of The Denver Post by Digital First Media, under the ownership of Alden Global Capital, has come under extensive criticism from workers at the newspaper and outside the organization. The hedge fund has made "relentless cost cuts" since taking ownership in 2010, despite the reported profitability of the Post, principally by laying off the newspaper's staff. Margaret Sullivan of The Washington Post called Alden Global Capital "one of the most ruthless of the corporate strip-miners seemingly intent on destroying local journalism." Under Digital Media First, the number of journalists in the newsroom was reduced by almost two-thirds by April 2018, to around 70 people. This represents a drastic fall from the over 250 journalists which The Denver Post employed before 2010, when it was purchased by Alden Media Group. At one point before 2009, the joint-operating agreement between The Denver Post and The Rocky Mountain News boasted a 600-strong staff of journalists, before the bankruptcy of the Rocky Mountain News that year.

The announcement of 30 more layoffs in March 2018, which reduced the paper's newsroom from 100 to around 70 people, prompted a denunciation of its owners from the editorial board of The Denver Post. The editorial decried Alden Global Capital as "vulture capitalists" who were "strip-mining" the newspaper; it concluded that "Denver deserves a newspaper owner who supports its newsroom. If Alden isn't willing to do good journalism here, it should sell the Post to owners who will." The editorial board pointed out that the cuts were hamstringing the ability of the Post to provide quality coverage of the fast-growing Denver region, and compared the size of its newsroom unfavorably to those of other newspapers in cities of comparable or smaller size to Denver. Alden's "harvesting strategy" is what prompted Greg Moore, editor of The Denver Post from 2002 to 2016, to step down.

The "open revolt" of the Denver Post against its owners garnered support and praise from other newspapers and journalists, including Mitchell Landsberg of the Los Angeles Times and Joe Nocera of Bloomberg View.

In 2020, a documentary, News Matters, was released that followed an attempt by Colorado journalists to save the 125-year-old Denver Post.

== Controversies ==
In February 2014, The Denver Post began publishing a section entitled "Energy and Environment", funded by Coloradans for Responsible Energy Development (CRED), a pro–natural gas group. The stories in the section are written by outsiders, not by DP reporters. A banner across the top of the section reads "This Section is Sponsored by CRED". Nevertheless, critics express concern that the section risks confusing readers about the distinction between advertising and reporting.

In January 2020, Jon Caldara Libertarian activist of the Denver-based Independence Institute, a weekly columnist for The Denver Post, was fired after publishing two conservative articles on sex and gender. In a column arguing for greater openness in public affairs, Caldara criticized the Colorado legislature for avoiding the legally required referendum on a new state tax by repackaging it as a “fee” — and then prohibiting hospitals from listing the fee on patients’ bills. He was also critical of the state’s educational authorities for imposing a speech code forbidding speech considered “stigmatizing”. “In case you hadn’t noticed,” he wrote, “just about everything is stigmatizing to the easily triggered, perpetually offended.” Continuing on his theme of transparency, he also complained that the schools were not doing enough to make parents aware of the contents of their sex-ed curriculum. While Caldara believes his "insistence" on the existence of only two sexes was "the last straw" for his column, he emphasizes "the reason for my firing is over a difference in style." He was officially fired for failing to use "respectful language" and the lack of a "collaborative and professional manner."

== Editors ==
Editors of The Denver Post include:

- Arnold Miller
- Robert W. Ritter, 1989–?
- F. Gilman Spencer
- Neil Westergaard
- Dennis A. Britton
- Glenn Guzzo
- Gregory L. Moore, 2002–2016
- Lee Ann Colacioppo, 2016–present

== Notable columnists ==
Former columnists include Woody Paige in sports, Tom Noel on local history, Mike Rosen on the commentary page. Other columnists included David Harsanyi, Al Lewis, Mike Littwin, Penny Parker and Michael Kane.

== Awards ==
=== Pulitzer Prizes ===
The Denver Post has won nine Pulitzer Prizes:

- 1964: Pulitzer Prize for Editorial Cartooning by Paul Conrad
- 1967: Pulitzer Prize for Editorial Cartooning by Pat Oliphant
- 1984: Pulitzer Prize for Feature Photography by Anthony Suau
- 1986: Pulitzer Prize for Public Service for a series on missing children
- 2000: Pulitzer Prize for Breaking News Reporting for its coverage of the Columbine High School massacre
- 2010: Pulitzer Prize for Feature Photography by Craig F. Walker
- 2011: Pulitzer Prize for Editorial Cartooning by Mike Keefe
- 2012: Pulitzer Prize for Feature Photography by Craig F. Walker
- 2013: Pulitzer Prize for Breaking News Reporting for its coverage of the 2012 Aurora, Colorado, shooting

References not listed below can be found on the linked pages.

=== National and international awards ===
- 2015 and 2016: Radio Television Digital News Association's Edward R. Murrow awards, including Lindsay Pierce/“Kailyn’s Spirit” in 2016, three in 2015.
- 2015: Pulitzer Prize finalist in Explanatory Reporting for coverage of Colorado's marijuana laws.
- 2007: Pulitzer Prize finalist in breaking news for The Denver Post's coverage of Colorado's back-to-back blizzards.
- 2007: Four awards for outstanding business coverage from the Society of American Business Editors and Writers (SABEW) for the newspaper's 2006 series on Colorado's mortgage foreclosure epidemic, titled "Foreclosing on the American Dream".
- 2007: Former Post staff writer Eric Gorski was awarded first place in "Best of the West" contest in the Business and Financial Reporting category for "The Gospel of Prosperity", a look at the finances of the Heritage Christian Center.
- 2007: Visual journalists at The Post won 10 awards in two international newspaper competitions – nine Awards of Excellence in the 28th annual Society of News Design judging and a bronze medal in the 15th annual Malofiej International Infographic Awards, held in Pamplona, Spain.

=== Local and regional awards ===
- 2013: The Carson J Spencer Foundation "Media All-Star" award for responsible reporting on suicide.
- 2007: The Denver Post won 22 top awards in two Colorado journalism contests, including the award for general excellence from the Colorado Associated Press Editors and Reporters (CAPER). The staff of denverpost.com was awarded top honors for online breaking news.
- 2007: The Mountain States Office of the Anti-Defamation League presented Denver Post editorial cartoonist Mike Keefe with its annual Freedom of the Press award.
