= List of Pi Beta Phi chapters =

Pi Beta Phi is an international women's fraternity founded in 1867. It was the first national secret college society for women based on Greek-letter fraternities for men.

== Chapter types ==
Originally, Pi Beta Phi recognized three types of chapters: College, Associate, and Alumnae. "College" chapters were equivalent to today's Active, collegiate chapters. "Associate" was defined, not as a "colony" as some organizations use the term today, but as a non-collegiate chapter where "members could be obtained possessing the same educational attainments as those possessed by members of the collegiate chapters." By 1884 no further Associate chapters (~Community-based) were created, with the fraternity's determination that none would be created in the future. (Note: Pi Beta Phi is the third-oldest of the women's fraternities, pre-dating the invention of the word "sorority". Early experiments with these "Community" or "Associate" chapters marked interest by non-collegiate but nevertheless "education-friendly" women to form organizations. Some of these, like the P.E.O. soon abandoned linkages to colleges and fully embraced a town/community model. Others, like those women's fraternities that eventually formed the National Panhellenic Conference, chose to focus on 4-year schools, self-determining to close non-collegiate chapters in the run-up to the establishment of the NPC.) "Alumnae" chapters had similar privileges as College chapters, except that they did not initiate new members. Alumnae chapters soon evolved into the modern alumnae clubs found today.

Discontinuation of Associate chapters (~Community chapters) and the adoption of a state naming system occurred during the period 1884–1888.

== Naming convention ==
For the first 21 years, chapters were granted names from the same series, without a "state" modifier. Some of these names were reused, as indicated by a (1) or (2) next to a chapter name. By 1888, a critical juncture was reached where any currently active chapters were renamed with a state modifier, a practice that continues today. Several Associate (~Community) chapters from the earlier, I.C. Sorosis period were granted state-series names even if they were dormant; but most were at small schools that had been closed for a decade or more. For clarity, these are listed in a separate section at the end of this list. By 1888 too, the Fraternity had fully shifted away from creating chapters at women's finishing schools, 2-yr schools, small seminaries, or simply non-academic "Associate (~Community) chapters", placing all its focus on 4-year schools.

== Chapters ==
Following is a list of Pi Beta Phi chapters. Active chapters noted in bold, inactive chapters and dormant schools noted in italics.

Chapter	Charter date and range	Institution	City or county	State or province	Country	Status	Ref.
**Illinois Alpha**	April 28, 1867–1884; May 25, 1928	Monmouth College	Monmouth	Illinois	US	Active	(Note: Anti-fraternity sentiment forced the group to relinquish its charter in 1884. At its 1928 restoration, the chapter absorbed Zeta Epsilon Chi (local), which had originated in 1890.) (Note: This chapter's name under the former I.C Sorosis system became the Alpha chapter. Curiously though, for the first fifteen years, it called itself the Beta chapter under the ruse that it was a branch of an earlier, Eastern society. This is why the second chapter was named Gamma (Pi Beta Phi 1936 History, p.6).) (Note: I.C. Sorosis wasn't the first women's fraternity on campus. The 1936 History notes an earlier "A" Society, visible at Monmouth in the 1860s, which, while not a direct predecessor of the I.C. Sorosis, contributed one of its members, Emma Brownlee Kilgore to the nascent Pi Beta Phi. Emma Brownlee would become one of the founders of I.C. Sorosis in 1867, and its first president. p.24ff)
Iowa Alpha	December 21, 1868–2004	Iowa Wesleyan University	Mount Pleasant	Iowa	US	Inactive	(Note: Iowa Wesleyan University closed in 2023 due to financial challenges.) (Note: This chapter's name under the former I.C Sorosis system was Gamma chapter.)
**Indiana Epsilon** (Originally Epsilon)	1870–1877; September 1, 1942	DePauw University	Greencastle	Indiana	US	Active	(Note: This school was named Indiana Ashbury University when its original chapter of I.C. Sorosis was established. It was renamed DePauw University in 1884 to honor a significant donor.) (Note: This chapter's original name was Epsilon chapter, a group that died out before the state name shift in 1888.) (Note: At its 1942 restoration, the new chapter absorbed Pi Phi Epsilon (local), which had been created for this purpose in 1941; its creation as Indiana Epsilon was coincidental, per the Arrow 2017 reference, not designed to reflect its earlier name on the campus.) (Note: Pi Beta Phi notes Indiana Epsilon as a wholly new chapter, fully independent from the original chapter on that campus. For Wikipedia purposes, we combine instances of previous chapters under a single school line.)
Illinois Beta (see **Illinois Beta-Delta**)	November 7, 1872–June 1930	Lombard College	Galesburg	Illinois	US	Merged	(Note: This chapter formed at Lombard College in Galesburg, Illinois in 1872 as Iota chapter, under the former naming structure used by I.C Sorosis. It was soon renamed Illinois Beta with the new naming structure. When Lombard College closed in 1930, many of its students, including members of ΠΒΦ, transferred to nearby Knox College, joining ΠΒΦ's Delta chapter. The combined group is now called Illinois Beta-Delta chapter.)
**Kansas Alpha**	April 1, 1873	University of Kansas	Lawrence	Kansas	US	Active	(Note: This chapter originated as the Oread Society (local) before 1873.) (Note: This chapter's name under the former I.C Sorosis system was Kappa chapter.)
**Iowa Beta**	October 13, 1874	Simpson College	Indianola	Iowa	US	Active	(Note: There were two Lambda chapters before the completion of the shift to the state naming convention. Lambda (1) was the name of the Simpson College chapter from installation in 1874 until about 1884 (?), under the old I.C. Sorosis system until that group was renamed Iowa Beta chapter. This allowed the chapter at Coe College to adopt the name Lambda (2) in 1884.) (Note: Briefly named Lambda (1) chapter from installation until the state name shift which for the Simpson chapter occurred no later than 1884.)
**Iowa Gamma**	May 11, 1877–1894; February 24, 1906	Iowa State University	Ames	Iowa	US	Active	(Note: The chapter closed in 1894 due to anti-fraternity laws. This chapter absorbed Iota Theta (local) at the 1906 restoration, a group that had originated in 1904.) (Note: This chapter's name under the former I.C Sorosis system was Mu chapter.)
Iowa Epsilon	January 1, 1881–1887	Southern Iowa Normal School	Bloomfield	Iowa	US	Inactive	(Note: This school closed in 1919.)
**Iowa Zeta**	February 8, 1882	University of Iowa	Iowa City	Iowa	US	Active	(Note: This chapter's name under the former I.C Sorosis system was Chi chapter at creation, but some months later, still in 1882, it was changed to Sigma chapter. The installation date noted here, Feb. 8, 1882, is from the 1936 History; other sources may show a date four days later.)
Illinois Gamma	September 13, 1882–1888	Carthage College	Carthage (Note: This school has had several locations during its long history. In 1962 it moved to its present location in Kenosha, Wisconsin, keeping the Carthage name, which it adopted from that Illinois city.)	Illinois	US	Inactive	(Note: This chapter's name under the former I.C Sorosis system was Tau chapter.)
**Illinois Beta-Delta** (see Illinois Beta)	March 7, 1884	Knox College	Galesburg	Illinois	US	Active	(Note: This chapter formed at Knox College in Galesburg, Illinois in 1884, called Upsilon chapter under the old I.C. Sorosis system, until that group was renamed Illinois Delta chapter. A neighboring school, Lombard College was also home to the Beta chapter of ΠΒΦ. When Lombard closed in 1930 most of Lombard's students transferred to Knox. Transferring ΠΒΦ members affiliated with the Illinois Delta chapter, which was re-christened Illinois Beta-Delta chapter to mark the combination. The chapter celebrates its founding year as the installation year of the Delta chapter, not the Beta chapter, even though Beta's origination came twelve years earlier.)
Nebraska Alpha	January 1, 1884–1892	York Methodist College	York	Nebraska	US	Inactive	(Note: Nebraska Methodist College is listed incorrectly in Baird's as the location of this early chapter. The 4th ed. of that book has it more correctly, as York Methodist. Indicating the thinnest of connections, in 1884, Nebraska Methodist College of Omaha became a subsidiary branch of York Methodist, but this only lasted for four/five years until the closure of York Methodist.) (Note: Briefly, according to the Larson dissertation, a Methodist college was platted and built in York, Nebraska in 1879, with classes beginning in 1880. That school grew quickly with several departments, but floundered in 1887/88 due to financial pressure with its grounds trading hands several times prior to their eventual dispersal. Its single brick building and nearby women's dorm first went to the Ursuline Academy in 1889, then to St. Joseph's Academy. There appeared no continuing linkage to the Nebraska Methodist College, a medical college, which had in Baird's been noted as the location of this chapter. Other references note that early medical school was only formed in 1891, but the Larson reference suggests a predecessor. Clearly, ΠΒΦ's Nebraska Alpha chapter, active between 1884 and 1888 (I think the chapter's closure date of 1892 in the Baird's Archive is a mistake) got its start at the York school. The 1936 History notes that the school moved, with the Convention of 1888 ordering transfer of the chapter's charter to the "University at Lincoln". York, Nebraska was the location of the women's dorm that had been associated with the college. Wikipedia's list of Nebraska schools does not list an earlier, nor even dormant school of this name, however, the 2017 Arrow reference citation notes that "Nebraska Methodist College closed in 1892," probably a stand-in for what should have been noted as "York Methodist College." Also suggesting an answer, the 4th ed. of Baird's calls the home of this chapter "York Methodist College", as does a biography of Minnie Mae (Freeman) Penney, an early member who, as a 19-yr old teacher was credited with saving her 13 pupils from a surprise blizzard on January 12, 1888. As she entered the teaching field, it is reasonable to assume the ΠΒΦ chapter was in service to the literary or music departments, not the medical department.)
**Colorado Alpha**	October 15, 1884	University of Colorado Boulder	Boulder	Colorado	US	Active	(Note: There were two Nu chapters prior to the shift to the state naming convention. The first was a community chapter in Clarinda, Iowa, and the second, briefly, was at the University of Colorado before that group was renamed Colorado Alpha chapter.) (Note: Briefly named Nu (2) chapter from installation until the 1888 name shift.)
Colorado Beta	February 12, 1885–1980	University of Denver	Denver	Colorado	US	Inactive	(Note: This chapter's name under the former I.C Sorosis system was Beta chapter.)
Iowa Lambda	October 26, 1886–1888	Callanan College (see Drake)	Des Moines	Iowa	US	Inactive	(Note: Callanan College was organized in 1879. It became an autonomous unit of Drake University in 1886. The chapter did not survive this merger, and died out in 1888. The college was fully absorbed by Drake by 1895. The terms of the merger allowed it to operate as Drake's Normal (~Teachers) school under its original name, until that department was absorbed into the university proper (~1895). Later, the Drake Music Department maintained its headquarters in the original Callanan building, located at 12th and Pleasant.)
**Michigan Alpha**	May 21, 1887	Hillsdale College	Hillsdale	Michigan	US	Active	
Nebraska Beta (1)	November 17, 1887–1888	Hastings College ?	Hastings	Nebraska	US	Inactive	(Note: The 2017 Arrow notes that there were two chapters named Nebraska Beta, the first at Hastings and the second at the University of Nebraska. It further states that Hastings College closed (?) in 1888, which is the reason given for the first chapter's closing. --Yet the school remains open today and its online history and its Wikipedia article do not mention an 1888 closure. Needs clarification.)
**Indiana Alpha**	January 16, 1888	Franklin College	Franklin	Indiana	US	Active	(Note: This chapter originated as Alpha Xi Theta (local) in 1887.)
**Michigan Beta**	April 7, 1888	University of Michigan	Ann Arbor	Michigan	US	Active	
**D.C. Alpha**	April 27, 1889–1968; January 27, 2007	George Washington University	Washington	District of Columbia	US	Active	
**Ohio Alpha**	December 16, 1889	Ohio University	Athens	Ohio	US	Active	(Note: This chapter originated as Omega Gamma Chi (local) in 1888.)
**Minnesota Alpha**	May 30, 1890–1896; September 8, 1906	University of Minnesota	Minneapolis	Minnesota	US	Active	(Note: This chapter originated as the Secret Six Club (local) in 1889. Pi Phi records note it was closed due to "effects of the Panic of 1873", which occurred some years prior. At its restoration it absorbed Beta Iota Gamma (local) formed in c.1904.)
**Louisiana Alpha**	October 29, 1891	Tulane University/Newcomb College	New Orleans	Louisiana	US	Active	
New York Alpha (1) (see **New York Delta**)	1892–1893	Cornell University	Ithaca	New York	US	Reassigned	(Note: The original chapter at Cornell University was named New York Alpha, but was renamed New York Delta upon its return to the Cornell campus. Not to be confused with the chapter at Syracuse University, also called New York Alpha.)
Pennsylvania Alpha	October 12, 1892–1934	Swarthmore College	Swarthmore	Pennsylvania	US	Inactive	(Note: This chapter closed as a result of anti-fraternity legislation from the college. Occasionally, Greek Letter activity resumes on the campus.)
**Indiana Beta** (see Eta)	April 13, 1893	Indiana University	Bloomington	Indiana	US	Active	(Note: A short-lived Eta chapter was installed in 1872 at the precursor school to Indiana University. It closed in 1885.)
**California Alpha**	September 13, 1893–1897; February 11, 1903–1944; November 11, 1978	Stanford University	Stanford	California	US	Active	(Note: The Arrow 2017 reference notes that the Stanford chapter was restored for the first time on Feb. 11, 1905, which conflicts with the Baird's archive, which notes the restoration year as 1903. Which is correct? The chapter was closed due to anti-fraternity pressure in 1944, and restored for a second time when that policy was lifted.)
Vermont Alpha	December 1, 1893–1969	Middlebury College	Middlebury	Vermont	US	Inactive	
**Ohio Beta**	April 5, 1894	Ohio State University	Columbus	Ohio	US	Active	
Illinois Epsilon	May 26, 1894–2021	Northwestern University	Evanston	Illinois	US	Inactive	
**Wisconsin Alpha**	November 1, 1894–1970; October 11, 1986	University of Wisconsin–Madison	Madison	Wisconsin	US	Active	
Pennsylvania Beta	January 4, 1895–2013	Bucknell University	Lewisburg	Pennsylvania	US	Inactive	
**Nebraska Beta (2)**	January 19, 1895	University of Nebraska	Lincoln	Nebraska	US	Active	
**Illinois Zeta**	October 26, 1895	University of Illinois	Champaign–Urbana	Illinois	US	Active	
New York Alpha (2)	February 12, 1896–1984; April 31, 1988–2013	Syracuse University	Syracuse	New York	US	Inactive	(Note: This chapter originated as the Philokalean Club in 1895.) (Note: The chapter at Cornell University had been named New York Alpha between 1892 and 1893, but was closed. That name was reassigned to the Syracuse group where it remains. Upon the Cornell chapter's restoration, that group was re-christened as New York Delta.)
Massachusetts Alpha	March 7, 1896–1985	Boston University	Boston	Massachusetts	US	Inactive	
Maryland Alpha	January 9, 1897–1950	Goucher College	Towson	Maryland	US	Inactive	(Note: This chapter closed due to anti-fraternity legislation by school trustees.) (Note: This school was originally named the Women's College of Baltimore. It was renamed in 1910 to honor its co-founder, benefactor and second president, John F. Goucher.)
**Indiana Gamma**	August 27, 1897	Butler University	Indianapolis	Indiana	US	Active	(Note: This chapter originated as Alpha Phi Psi (local) in 1894.)
**Vermont Beta**	November 24, 1898	University of Vermont	Burlington	Vermont	US	Active	
**Missouri Alpha**	May 27, 1899	University of Missouri	Columbia	Missouri	US	Active	(Note: This chapter originated as the Iazug Club earlier in 1899.)
**California Beta**	August 23, 1900	University of California	Berkeley	California	US	Active	
**Texas Alpha**	February 19, 1902	University of Texas	Austin	Texas	US	Active	(Note: This chapter originated as Delta Delta Delta (local) in 1898. The name similarity to national sorority ΔΔΔ appears to be coincidental. They appeared on the Texas campus a decade later.)
**Pennsylvania Gamma**	December 21, 1903	Dickinson College	Carlisle	Pennsylvania	US	Active	(Note: This chapter originated as Phi Alpha Pi (local) in 1898.)
New York Beta	May 28, 1904–1915	Barnard College (Columbia)	Manhattan	New York	US	Inactive	(Note: This chapter originated as Tau Beta (local) in 1902. Its charter was finally relinquished in 1915 after the college suspended all fraternities in 1913, two years prior.)
**Washington Alpha**	January 5, 1907	University of Washington	Seattle	Washington	US	Active	(Note: This chapter originated as Kappa Tau Tau (local) in 1900.)
Missouri Beta	March 22, 1907–2020	Washington University in St. Louis	St. Louis	Missouri	US	Inactive	(Note: This chapter originated as the Jeserah Club in 1905.)
**Ontario Alpha**	December 11, 1908	University of Toronto	Toronto	Ontario	Canada	Active	(Note: This chapter originated as Zeta Tau (local) in 1900.)
**Arkansas Alpha**	December 29, 1909	University of Arkansas	Fayetteville	Arkansas	US	Active	(Note: This chapter originated as Gamma Epsilon Delta (local) in 1906.)
**Oklahoma Alpha**	September 1, 1910	University of Oklahoma	Norman	Oklahoma	US	Active	(Note: This chapter originated as Phi Delta Gamma (local) in 1907.)
Wyoming Alpha	September 8, 1910–2013	University of Wyoming	Laramie	Wyoming	US	Inactive	(Note: This chapter originated as Alpha Omega (local) in 1905.)
Ohio Gamma	September 20, 1910–1913	College of Wooster	Wooster	Ohio	US	Inactive	(Note: More information about the closure of Wooster's national Greek chapters may be found here: List of College of Wooster fraternities and sororities.) (Note: This chapter originated as Alpha Delta Psi (local) in 1908.)
**Illinois Eta**	March 29, 1912	Millikin University	Decatur	Illinois	US	Active	(Note: This chapter originated as Delta Theta Psi (local) in 1904.)
**Washington Beta**	July 6, 1912–2012; January 24, 2015	Washington State University	Pullman	Washington	US	Active	(Note: This chapter originated as Phi Alpha Epsilon (local) in 1909.)
**Florida Alpha**	January 30, 1913	Stetson University	DeLand	Florida	US	Active	(Note: This chapter originated as Delta Alpha Delta (local) in 1910.)
Virginia Alpha	May 13, 1913–1960	Randolph College	Lynchburg	Virginia	US	Inactive	(Note: Originally named Randolph-Macon Women's College; renamed in 2007 when the school became co-educational.) (Note: This chapter originated as the Iota chapter of Alpha Sigma Alpha on May 23, 1908. Because of laws abolishing fraternities, the Iota chapter disbanded but its members persisted and petitioned Pi Beta Phi for membership. This was accepted, and the new chapter was installed on May 13, 1913. Again, anti-fraternity regulations provoked the chapter's closure in 1960.)
**Missouri Gamma**	January 9, 1914	Drury University	Springfield	Missouri	US	Active	(Note: This chapter originated as Mu Beta (local) in 1906.)
New York Gamma	March 20, 1914–1993	St. Lawrence University	Canton	New York	US	Inactive	(Note: This chapter originated as Omega Gamma Sigma (local) in 1904.)
**Kansas Beta**	June 3, 1915	Kansas State University	Manhattan	Kansas	US	Active	(Note: This chapter originated as Phi Kappa Phi (local) in 1904.)
**Oregon Alpha**	October 29, 1915	University of Oregon	Eugene	Oregon	US	Active	(Note: This chapter originated as Mu Phi Epsilon (local) earlier in 1915.)
**Nevada Alpha**	November 13, 1915–2013; September 2017	University of Nevada, Reno	Reno	Nevada	US	Active	(Note: This chapter originated as Delta Rho (local) in 1900.)
**Texas Beta**	June 10, 1916	Southern Methodist University	University Park	Texas	US	Active	(Note: This chapter originated as Pi Beta (local) in 1915.)
Virginia Beta	June 1, 1917–1930	Hollins University	Hollins	Virginia	US	Inactive	(Note: This chapter originated as Lambda Gamma (local) in 1914.)
Oregon Beta	July 23, 1917–2006	Oregon State University	Corvallis	Oregon	US	Inactive	(Note: This chapter originated as Delta Mu (local) in 1915.)
**California Gamma**	July 27, 1917	University of Southern California	Los Angeles	California	US	Active	(Note: This chapter originated as the Entre Nous Club (local) in 1895.)
**Arizona Alpha**	August 1, 1917	University of Arizona	Tucson	Arizona	US	Active	(Note: This chapter originated as Gamma Delta (local) in 1906.)
Pennsylvania Delta	September 19, 1918–1931	University of Pittsburgh	Pittsburgh	Pennsylvania	US	Inactive	(Note: This chapter originated as the Dianthian Club (local) in 1916.)
**West Virginia Alpha**	September 21, 1918	West Virginia University	Morgantown	West Virginia	US	Active	(Note: This chapter originated as the Circle Club (local) in 1916.)
**New York Delta** (see New York Alpha (1))	June 14, 1919	Cornell University	Ithaca	New York	US	Active	(Note: The original chapter at Cornell University (1892-1893) was named New York Alpha, but was renamed New York Delta upon its 1919 return to the Cornell campus.) (Note: This chapter originated as Beta Phi (local) in 1918.)
**Oklahoma Beta**	August 12, 1919	Oklahoma State University	Stillwater	Oklahoma	US	Active	(Note: This chapter originated as Beta Phi (local) in 1915.)
Wisconsin Beta	August 20, 1919–1971	Beloit College	Beloit	Wisconsin	US	Inactive	(Note: This chapter originated as Chi Epsilon (local) in 1905.) (Note: A recolonization at Beloit was attempted in 1979, but withdrawn in 1980 prior to installation.)
**Maine Alpha**	May 25, 1920	University of Maine	Orono	Maine	US	Active	(Note: This chapter originated as Beta Phi (local) in 1917.)
**Indiana Delta**	January 1, 1921	Purdue University	West Lafayette	Indiana	US	Active	(Note: This chapter originated as Delta Rho (local) in 1915.)
**Montana Alpha**	September 30, 1921	Montana State University	Bozeman	Montana	US	Active	(Note: This chapter originated as Phi Gamma (local) in 1912.)
**North Dakota Alpha**	October 7, 1921	University of North Dakota	Grand Forks	North Dakota	US	Active	(Note: This chapter originated as Psi Omega Psi (local) in 1916.)
**Florida Beta**	October 14, 1921	Florida State University	Tallahassee	Florida	US	Active	(Note: This chapter originated as Alpha Omega (local) in 1913.)
Tennessee Alpha	September 26, 1923–1989	University of Tennessee at Chattanooga	Chattanooga	Tennessee	US	Inactive	(Note: This chapter originated as Alpha Sigma Phi (local) in 1917.)
**Idaho Alpha**	September 28, 1923	University of Idaho	Moscow	Idaho	US	Active	(Note: This chapter originated as Omega Phi Alpha (local) in 1920.)
**North Carolina Alpha**	September 28, 1923	University of North Carolina	Chapel Hill	North Carolina	US	Active	(Note: This chapter originated as Beta Alpha Pi (local) in 1921.)
**Virginia Gamma**	September 26, 1925	College of William & Mary	Williamsburg	Virginia	US	Active	(Note: This chapter originated as Delta Phi Kappa (local) in 1920.)
Ohio Delta	October 3, 1925–1992	Ohio Wesleyan University	Delaware	Ohio	US	Inactive	(Note: This chapter originated as Tri Sigma (local), forming in 1899. It was unrelated to the later-formed national sorority nicknamed Tri Sigma, which had started only a year prior. Possibly due to concern over rights to that name, the local Ohio Wesleyan chapter renamed itself Sigma Delta Pi (local) in 1922.)
**Kentucky Alpha**	October 9, 1925	University of Louisville	Louisville	Kentucky	US	Active	(Note: This chapter originated as the Tri Xi Club (local) in 1921.)
**California Delta**	September 9, 1927	University of California, Los Angeles	Los Angeles	California	US	Active	(Note: This chapter originated as Alpha Tau Zeta (local) in 1918.)
**South Dakota Alpha**	September 30, 1927	University of South Dakota	Vermillion	South Dakota	US	Active	(Note: This chapter originated as Zeta Chi Delta (local) in 1920.)
Alabama Alpha	October 7, 1927–1989; February 10, 1991–2024	Birmingham–Southern College	Birmingham	Alabama	US	Inactive	(Note: This chapter originated as Theta Pi (local) in 1923.)
**Utah Alpha**	September 11, 1929	University of Utah	Salt Lake City	Utah	US	Active	(Note: This chapter originated as Gamma Phi (local) in 1897.)
Florida Gamma	April 28, 1929–1970	Rollins College	Winter Park	Florida	US	Inactive	(Note: This chapter originated as Sigma Phi (local) in 1920.)
Manitoba Alpha	October 5, 1929–1976	University of Manitoba	Winnipeg	Manitoba	Canada	Inactive	(Note: This chapter originated as Delta Phi (local) in 1925.)
**Alberta Alpha**	September 22, 1931	University of Alberta	Edmonton	Alberta	Canada	Active	(Note: This chapter originated as Alpha Upsilon (local) in 1928.)
**South Carolina Alpha**	October 9, 1931–1985; November 22, 2014	University of South Carolina	Columbia	South Carolina	US	Active	(Note: This chapter originated as Gamma Sigma (local) in 1927.)
**North Carolina Beta**	February 17, 1933	Duke University	Durham	North Carolina	US	Active	(Note: This chapter originated as Mu Lambda (local) in 1929.)
**Ontario Beta**	October 29, 1934	University of Western Ontario	London	Ontario	Canada	Active	(Note: This chapter originated as Upsilon Iota Sigma (local) in 1920.)
Nova Scotia Alpha	November 2, 1934–1976	Dalhousie University	Halifax	Nova Scotia	Canada	Inactive	(Note: This chapter originated as Sigma Theta Pi (local) in 1929.)
**Louisiana Beta**	October 17, 1936	Louisiana State University	Baton Rouge	Louisiana	US	Active	(Note: This chapter originated as Pi Beta (local) in 1935.)
**Georgia Alpha**	February 4, 1939	University of Georgia	Athens	Georgia	US	Active	
Wisconsin Gamma	September 12, 1940–1983	Lawrence University	Appleton	Wisconsin	US	Inactive	(Note: This chapter originated as Pi Phi Gamma (local) in 1939.)
**Tennessee Beta**	September 10, 1940	Vanderbilt University	Nashville	Tennessee	US	Active	
**Connecticut Alpha**	April 10, 1943	University of Connecticut	Storrs	Connecticut	US	Active	(Note: This chapter originated as Sigma Upsilon Nu (local) in 1931.)
Massachusetts Beta	March 4, 1944–1973	University of Massachusetts Amherst	Amherst	Massachusetts	US	Inactive	(Note: This chapter originated as Alpha Lambda Mu (local) in 1931.)
Oregon Gamma	June 3, 1944–2021	Willamette University	Salem	Oregon	US	Inactive	(Note: This chapter originated as Beta Chi (local) in 1919.)
Maryland Beta	June 17, 1944–1991	University of Maryland	College Park	Maryland	US	Inactive	(Note: This chapter originated as Pi Phi Beta (local) in 1944.)
**Michigan Gamma**	February 17, 1945	Michigan State University	East Lansing	Michigan	US	Active	(Note: This chapter originated as Pi Phi Gamma (local) in 1944.)
**Ohio Epsilon**	April 28, 1945	University of Toledo	Toledo	Ohio	US	Active	(Note: This chapter originated as Pi Delta Chi (local) in 1915.)
**Ohio Zeta**	May 11, 1945–2017; 2024	Miami University	Oxford	Ohio	US	Active	(Note: This chapter originated as Gamma Pi (local) in 1944.)
**New Mexico Alpha**	September 11, 1946	University of New Mexico	Albuquerque	New Mexico	US	Active	(Note: This chapter originated as Pi Beta Alpha (local) in 1946.)
**Illinois Theta**	May 17, 1947	Bradley University	Peoria	Illinois	US	Active	(Note: This chapter originated as Lambda Phi (local) in 1901.)
**Tennessee Gamma**	May 15, 1948	University of Tennessee	Knoxville	Tennessee	US	Active	(Note: This chapter originated as Pi Gamma Phi (local) in 1947.)
**Washington Gamma**	September 9, 1948	University of Puget Sound	Tacoma	Washington	US	Active	(Note: This chapter originated as Kappa Sigma Theta (local) in 1922.)
**California Epsilon**	September 1, 1949	San Diego State University	San Diego	California	US	Active	(Note: This chapter originated as Phi Sigma Nu (local) in 1925.)
**Alabama Beta**	September 19, 1949	University of Alabama	Tuscaloosa	Alabama	US	Active	
**California Zeta**	February 2, 1950	University of California, Santa Barbara	Santa Barbara	California	US	Active	(Note: This chapter originated as Delta Zeta Delta (local) in 1924.)
West Virginia Beta	September 21, 1950–1955	Davis & Elkins College	Elkins	West Virginia	US	Inactive	(Note: This chapter originated as Phi Chi (local) in 1922.)
**Indiana Zeta**	August 23, 1952	Ball State University	Muncie	Indiana	US	Active	(Note: This chapter originated as Gamma Gamma (local) in 1920.)
**Texas Gamma**	April 25, 1953	Texas Tech University	Lubbock	Texas	US	Active	(Note: This chapter originated as the Koshari Club (local) in 1930.)
**Pennsylvania Epsilon**	November 14, 1953	Pennsylvania State University	University Park	Pennsylvania	US	Active	(Note: This chapter originated as the Aye Sees Club (local) in 1952.)
**Colorado Gamma**	September 8, 1954	Colorado State University	Fort Collins	Colorado	US	Active	(Note: This chapter originated as Pi Phi Gamma (local) in 1953.)
**Ohio Eta**	September 18, 1954	Denison University	Granville	Ohio	US	Active	
**Texas Delta**	August 30, 1956	Texas Christian University	Fort Worth	Texas	US	Active	(Note: This chapter originated as Pi Phi Alpha (local) in 1955.)
**Alabama Gamma**	February 2, 1957	Auburn University	Auburn	Alabama	US	Active	
Michigan Delta	March 7, 1959–1985	Albion College	Albion	Michigan	US	Inactive	
Oregon Delta	December 4, 1960–1980	Portland State University	Portland	Oregon	US	Inactive	(Note: This chapter originated as Chi Gamma (local) in 1954.)
**Mississippi Alpha**	April 8, 1961	University of Southern Mississippi	Hattiesburg	Mississippi	US	Active	(Note: This chapter originated as Pi Phi Alpha (local) in 1960.)
**Kentucky Beta**	March 3, 1962	University of Kentucky	Lexington	Kentucky	US	Active	(Note: This chapter originated as Phi Kappa Phi (local) in 1904.)
**Mississippi Beta**	March 10, 1962	University of Mississippi	Oxford	Mississippi	US	Active	
**Tennessee Delta**	February 24, 1962	University of Memphis	Memphis	Tennessee	US	Active	
Arkansas Beta	May 4, 1963–2008	University of Arkansas at Little Rock	Little Rock	Arkansas	US	Inactive	(Note: This chapter originated as Beta Chi (local) in 1932.)
**Virginia Delta**	January 9, 1965	Old Dominion University	Norfolk	Virginia	US	Active	(Note: This chapter originated as Kappa Kappa Kappa (local) in 1930.)
**Arizona Beta**	May 1, 1965	Arizona State University	Phoenix	Arizona	US	Active	
West Virginia Gamma	March 2, 1968–1981	Bethany College	Bethany	West Virginia	US	Inactive	(Note: This chapter originated as Pi Alpha Theta (local) in 1966.)
**Florida Delta**	April 19, 1969–1977; February 9, 1985	University of Florida	Gainesville	Florida	US	Active	
New Mexico Beta	January 22, 1972–2016	New Mexico State University	Las Cruces	New Mexico	US	Inactive	(Note: This chapter originated as Kappa Chi Upsilon (local) in 1970.)
Illinois Iota	January 19, 1974–2018	Illinois State University	Normal	Illinois	US	Inactive	(Note: This chapter originated as Pi Beta Coop (local) in 1967.)
**California Eta**	January 26, 1974–2004	University of California, Irvine	Irvine	California	US	Active	
Indiana Eta	October 26, 1974–2004	Indiana University–Purdue University Fort Wayne	Fort Wayne	Indiana	US	Inactive	(Note: This chapter originated as Kappa Delta Theta (local) in 1968.)
**Virginia Epsilon**	April 12, 1975	University of Virginia	Charlottesville	Virginia	US	Active	
**Texas Epsilon**	January 31, 1976	University of North Texas	Denton	Texas	US	Active	(Note: This chapter originated as Omicron (local) in 1971.)
Kentucky Gamma	August 28, 1976–2017	Eastern Kentucky University	Richmond	Kentucky	US	Inactive	
**South Carolina Beta**	October 30, 1976–1993; November 19, 2016	Clemson University	Clemson	South Carolina	US	Active	
**Texas Zeta**	August 13, 1977	Baylor University	Waco	Texas	US	Active	(Note: This chapter originated as Alpha Omega (local) in 1924.)
**Pennsylvania Zeta**	November 10, 1979	Washington & Jefferson College	Washington	Pennsylvania	US	Active	(Note: W&J's Greek system is discussed further at Washington & Jefferson College fraternities and sororities.)
**Pennsylvania Eta**	October 4, 1980	Lafayette College	Easton	Pennsylvania	US	Active	(Note: This chapter originated as Delta Psi (local) in 1978.)
**California Theta**	November 8, 1980	University of California, Davis	Davis	California	US	Active	(Note: This chapter originated as Pianta Su (local) in 19xx ?)
**Florida Epsilon**	January 10, 1981	University of Central Florida	Orange County	Florida	US	Active	(Note: This chapter originated as the Tyes Club (local) in 1968.)
**Virginia Zeta**	December 5, 1981	Virginia Tech	Blacksburg	Virginia	US	Active	
Iowa Eta (2) (see Iowa Lambda)	October 8, 1983–2005	Drake University	Des Moines	Iowa	US	Inactive	(Note: As Callanan College was absorbed into Drake University, its former Iowa Lambda chapter could be considered a predecessor to the later-formed Iowa Eta (2) chapter.)
**New York Epsilon**	November 17, 1984	Rensselaer Polytechnic Institute	Troy	New York	US	Active	(Note: This chapter originated as Kappa Phi (local) in 1982.)
**Texas Eta**	April 20, 1985	Texas A&M University	College Station	Texas	US	Active	
**Ohio Theta**	April 19, 1986	Bowling Green State University	Bowling Green	Ohio	US	Active	
**Colorado Delta**	February 1, 1986	Colorado School of Mines	Golden	Colorado	US	Active	(Note: This chapter originated as Omega Delta Phi (local) in 1983.)
New York Zeta	May 3, 1986–1992	Colgate University	Hamilton	New York	US	Inactive	(Note: This chapter originated as Kappa Psi Lambda (local) in 1984.)
California Iota	September 5, 1986–2005	California State University, Chico	Chico	California	US	Inactive	(Note: This chapter originated as Gamma Nu (local) in 1984.)
**California Kappa**	April 25, 1987	University of California, San Diego	San Diego	California	US	Active	
Virginia Eta	May 2, 1987–April 13, 2025	University of Richmond	Richmond	Virginia	US	Inactive	
**California Lambda**	November 5, 1988	University of California, Riverside	Riverside	California	US	Active	
**Ohio Iota**	October 14, 1989	University of Dayton	Dayton	Ohio	US	Active	
Connecticut Beta	November 11, 1989–2023	Yale University	New Haven	Connecticut	US	Inactive	
Pennsylvania Theta	February 10, 1990–2018	Villanova University	Villanova	Pennsylvania	US	Inactive	
**New Jersey Alpha**	March 31, 1990	Princeton University	Princeton	New Jersey	US	Active	
**Arizona Gamma**	April 21, 1990	Northern Arizona University	Flagstaff	Arizona	US	Active	
Wisconsin Delta	November 11, 1990-2026	Marquette University	Milwaukee	Wisconsin	US	Inactive	(Note: This chapter originated as Kappa Xi Kappa (local) in 1988.)
**Virginia Theta**	May 25, 1992	Washington and Lee University	Lexington	Virginia	US	Active	
Pennsylvania Iota	February 6, 1993–2000	University of Pennsylvania	Philadelphia	Pennsylvania	US	Inactive	
**Nebraska Gamma**	April 9, 1994	Creighton University	Omaha	Nebraska	US	Active	
North Carolina Gamma	January 22, 1994–2010	Wake Forest University	Winston-Salem	North Carolina	US	Inactive	(Note: Originally located in Wake Forest, the school moved to Winston-Salem in 1956 after a period of building construction.) (Note: This chapter originated as the Strings Society (local) in 1946.)
Michigan Epsilon	April 13, 1996–2014	Western Michigan University	Kalamazoo	Michigan	US	Inactive	(Note: This chapter originated as Gamma Phi Sigma (local) in 1993.)
**California Mu**	October 19, 1996	Pepperdine University	Malibu	California	US	Active	(Note: This chapter originated as Pi Gamma Phi (local) in 1984.)
**Ontario Gamma**	November 23, 1996	University of Guelph	Guelph	Ontario	Canada	Active	(Note: This chapter originated as Delta Sigma Chi (local) in 1992.)
**Pennsylvania Kappa**	October 25, 1997	Lehigh University	Bethlehem	Pennsylvania	US	Active	
**Indiana Theta**	October 31, 1998	Valparaiso University	Valparaiso	Indiana	US	Active	(Note: This chapter originated as Alpha Xi Epsilon (local) in 1919.)
**Colorado Epsilon**	April 21, 2002	University of Colorado Colorado Springs	Colorado Springs	Colorado	US	Active	(Note: This chapter originated as Phi Alpha Omega (local) in 1997.)
**California Nu**	November 16, 2002	Loyola Marymount University	Los Angeles	California	US	Active	
**North Carolina Delta**	January 29, 2005	North Carolina State University	Raleigh	North Carolina	US	Active	
**Massachusetts Gamma**	November 15, 2008	Massachusetts Institute of Technology	Cambridge	Massachusetts	US	Active	
**New York Eta**	January 31, 2009	New York University	New York City	New York	US	Active	
**Mississippi Gamma**	April 4, 2009	Mississippi State University	Starkville	Mississippi	US	Active	
**Ohio Kappa**	January 23, 2010	University of Cincinnati	Cincinnati	Ohio	US	Active	
**Maryland Gamma**	November 20, 2010	Johns Hopkins University	Baltimore	Maryland	US	Active	
**Connecticut Gamma**	November 5, 2011–2019; 2021	Quinnipiac University	Hamden	Connecticut	US	Active	
**Ohio Lambda**	January 12, 2013	Case Western Reserve University	Cleveland	Ohio	US	Active	
**Illinois Kappa**	April 20, 2013	University of Chicago	Chicago	Illinois	US	Active	
Virginia Iota	January 25, 2014–2022	George Mason University	Fairfax County	Virginia	US	Inactive	
Florida Zeta	February 1, 2014–2020	University of Tampa	Tampa	Florida	US	Inactive	
**California Xi**	May 2, 2015	University of San Diego	San Diego	California	US	Active	
**California Omicron**	May 9, 2015	Chapman University	Orange	California	US	Active	
**Georgia Beta**	April 16, 2016	Emory University	Atlanta	Georgia	US	Active	
**Delaware Alpha**	May 14, 2016	University of Delaware	Newark	Delaware	US	Active	
**Florida Eta**	2021	University of Miami	Coral Gables	Florida	US	Active	
**Wisconsin Epsilon**	2021	University of Wisconsin–Green Bay	Green Bay	Wisconsin	US	Active	

== I.C. Sorosis chapters ==
The name the Fraternity first used was I.C. Sorosis, with "Pi Beta Phi" being a motto indicated on its crest. (Note: Per the 1936 History, the word "sorosis" was a rival, coined term and thus a synonym to the word "sorority" which was eventually adopted to describe this entire class of women's organizations. Hence, the esoteric name of this particular organization is "I.C.", which remains in use internally. Pi Beta Phi members may call themselves the I.C. Sorosis, where had others adopted the word there could also have been an "A.B. Sorosis", or an "X.Y.Z. Sorosis.") After the 1888 Ottumwa Convention usage of these was reversed so that the fraternity would be known as Pi Beta Phi, as it is today. This choice came about, apparently, to better align with the Greek Letter model popular with other men's and women's fraternities. The naming structure for chapters was also changed by the 1888 Ottumwa Convention, adopting a "state series" model. The following table lists chapters formed under an I.C. Sorosis charter, which went dormant about the time of the adoption of the state naming system. Many were what Pi Beta Phi then called "Associate chapters", not colonies, but rather 'Community' chapters not linked to a school, or "Alumnae chapters" that did not initiate new members.

Following is a list of I.C. Sorosis chapters from before the name change, which were either Associate (~Community) chapters or Alumni chapters that did not continue among the collegiate ranks. Inactive chapters and dormant schools noted in italics.

Original name	New name	Charter date and range	Institution	City or county	State or province	Country	Status	Ref.
Delta		1869–1871	Mount Pleasant Female Seminary	Mount Pleasant	Iowa	US	Consolidated	(Note: This early chapter was at a finishing school or seminary, not a college.) (Note: After relinquishing its charter in 1871 due to "serious disapproval" by the faculty (1936 History, p.43), most of its members were absorbed into the Iowa Alpha chapter at Iowa Wesleyan University.)
Epsilon	Indiana Epsilon	1870–1877; September 1, 1942	DePauw University	Greencastle	Indiana	US	Active	(Note: This school was named Indiana Ashbury University when its original chapter of I.C. Sorosis was established. It was renamed DePauw University in 1884 to honor a significant donor.) (Note: This chapter's original name was Epsilon chapter, a group that died out prior to the state name shift in 1888.) (Note: At its 1942 restoration, the new chapter absorbed Pi Phi Epsilon (local), which had been created for this purpose in 1941; its creation as Indiana Epsilon was coincidental, per the Arrow 2017 reference, not designed to reflect its earlier name on the campus.)
Zeta	NA	1870–1871	Baptist Ladies' Seminary	Indianapolis	Indiana	US	Inactive	
Theta	NA	February 18, 1872–187x ?	Illinois Wesleyan University	Bloomington	Illinois	US	Inactive	(Note: An early I.C.Sorosis group, this chapter didn't survive past 187x.)
Eta	Indiana Beta	1872–1885	State Institute (see IU)	Bloomington	Indiana	US	Inactive	
Nu (1)	NA	1881–1885	Clarinda, Iowa Community Chapter	Clarinda	Iowa	US	Inactive	(Note: There were two Nu chapters prior to the shift to the state naming convention. The first was a community chapter in Clarinda, Iowa, and the second, briefly, was at the University of Colorado before that group was renamed Colorado Alpha chapter.)
Xi	NA	1881–1892	Iowa East Normal School	Columbus Junction	Iowa	US	Inactive	
Omicron	Iowa Delta	1881–1885	Burlington, Iowa Community Chapter	Burlington	Iowa	US	Inactive	(Note: Later named Iowa Delta chapter to give it a state-series name, though the chapter was dormant.)
Phi	NA	1881–1883	Jacksonville Female Academy	Jacksonville	Illinois	US	Inactive	(Note: This school merged into Illinois College in 1903, making that a co-ed institution twenty years after the demise of the Jacksonville Female Academy.)
Rho	NA	1881–1883	Dearborn Seminary	Chicago	Illinois	US	Inactive	(Note: This school merged into the University of Chicago in 1899.)
Sigma (1)	NA	1881–1881	Central College	Pella	Iowa	US	Inactive	(Note: A very short-lived chapter, this school may have been Central College rather than "Pella College" as is listed in the Baird's Manual Archive.) (Note: Not to be confused with the ministry-oriented "Pella College" located in Glendale, AZ. This church-based organization was formed over 100 years later.)
Omega	NA	1882–1893	Des Moines, Iowa Community Chapter	Des Moines	Iowa	US	Inactive	
Beta Omega	Iowa Eta (1)	October 12, 1882–1890	Fairfield, Iowa Community Chapter	Fairfield	Iowa	US	Inactive	(Note: Later briefly named Iowa Eta (1) chapter to give it a state-series name, though the chapter was dormant. The Iowa Eta (2) chapter designation was later given to the chapter at Drake.)
Sigma (2)	NA	October 1883–188x ?	Cedar Rapids, Iowa Community Chapter	Cedar Rapids	Iowa	US	Inactive	(Note: This community chapter took the name of a very short-lived chapter in Pella, Iowa that had died out two years prior.)
Lambda (2)	NA	1884–1886	Coe College	Cedar Rapids	Iowa	US	Inactive	(Note: Was there a connection between this group and the Sigma (2) chapter, also located in Cedar Rapids?) (Note: There were two Lambda chapters prior to the shift to the state naming convention. The first was at Simpson College, briefly, before that group was renamed Iowa Beta chapter. Once that name became available it appears the Coe College chapter adopted it, in 1884 until closure in 1886.)
Zeta Omega	Iowa Theta	August 22, 1884–1892	Ottumwa, Iowa Community Chapter	Ottumwa	Iowa	US	Inactive	(Note: Named Iowa Theta chapter to give it a state-series name.)
Delta Omega	Iowa Kappa	September 1884–1884	Iowa City, Iowa Community Chapter	Iowa City	Iowa	US	Inactive	(Note: Briefly designated Iowa Kappa chapter to give it a state-series name, though the chapter was dormant. This group relinquished its charter within a few months of installation.)
Gamma Omega	Iowa Iota	August 1884–1894	Mt. Pleasant, Iowa Community Chapter	Mount Pleasant	Iowa	US	Inactive	(Note: There may be a connection between this chapter and two of ΠΒΦ's earliest chapters, Iowa Alpha chapter and Delta chapter.) (Note: Briefly named Iowa Iota chapter to give it a state-series name.)
Psi	NA	January 14, 1885–1886	Cincinnati Wesleyan College ?	Cincinnati	Ohio	US	Inactive	(Note: The school name is presently a redirect to Ohio Wesleyan Female College, but this may be in error as the dates don't line up. Possibly, Cincinnati Wesleyan College, which remained open until 1892, then merged itself into Ohio Wesleyan University.)
