= Gregory L. Moore =

American newspaper editor (born 1954)

- Born: 1954 (age 71–72); Cleveland, Ohio, U.S.
- Education: Ohio Wesleyan University (BA)
- Occupations: Journalist, newspaper editor
- Years active: 1976–present
- Employers: The Denver Post; The Boston Globe; The Plain Dealer; Deke Digital
- Title: Editor of The Denver Post (2002–2016); Managing Editor of The Boston Globe (1994–2002)
- Awards: NABJ Lifetime Achievement Award (2013); NABJ New England Journalist of the Year (1996)

Gregory L. Moore (born 1954) is an American journalist who was editor of The Denver Post from 2002 to 2016. Previously, he was managing editor of The Boston Globe.

== Career ==
A native of Cleveland, Ohio, Moore is a 1976 graduate of Ohio Wesleyan University where he earned a bachelor's degree in journalism and political science and where, as of 2016, he still served as a trustee.

Moore began his 40-year journalism career in 1976 at the Journal-Herald in Dayton, Ohio; he was a reporter covering crime, education, politics and government. He spent six years at The Plain Dealer, where he began his editing career, first as state political editor in 1982 and later as day city editor.

In 1986, Moore joined the Boston Globe as senior editor in charge of criminal justice and courts coverage. A year later, he was named city editor, and in 1989 he became the assistant managing editor for local news, responsible for the coverage of Boston, the suburbs and the five other New England states. In 1991, he was promoted to deputy managing editor and named managing editor in 1994. He supervised the newspaper's coverage of the September 11 attacks, an abortion-clinic shooting rampage, the racially charged Charles Stuart murder case, and Nelson Mandela's visit to Boston.

Upon his hiring by The Denver Post, that newspaper became the largest in the U.S. with an African-American editor. In his first week on the job, Moore oversaw one of the biggest breaking news stories to occur in Colorado, an arsonist's wildfire that was later dubbed the Hayman Fire. The conflagration took six weeks to extinguish, destroying 132 homes and 138,000 acres (560 km^{2}) of a drought-ravaged forest. During Moore's tenure, The Denver Post won four Pulitzer Prizes, one for breaking news reporting, one for editorial cartooning, and two for feature photography. Moore announced his retirement March 15, 2016, telling his staff that it was time for "new challenges."

Moore is a founding member of the Cleveland chapter of the National Association of Black Journalists (NABJ) and a former member of the national association's board. In 1996, he was named Journalist of the Year by the association's New England region. In 2013, NABJ gave its Lifetime Achievement Award to Moore. In 2004, he was elected to the Pulitzer Prize Board, and he was named its co-chair in 2012. His nine-year term on the board ended in 2013. From 1998 to 2004, he served on the board of directors of the American Society of Newspaper Editors, and he has been an instructor at the Poynter Institute for Media Studies and the American Press Institute.

Today, Moore is editor-in-chief of Deke Digital.
