= Michael Peters =

Michael or Mike Peters may refer to:

- Mike Peters (cartoonist) (born 1943), American cartoonist
- Michael Peters (choreographer) (1948–1994), American choreographer
- Michael Peters (education academic) (born 1948), professor of education
- Mike Peters (musician) (1959–2025), Welsh singer, musician and songwriter with the Alarm
- Michael Peters (media executive) (born 1971), Euronews executive and Africanews founder
- Michael Scott Peters (born 1994), American official of the United Nations
- Mike Peters, drummer with Cancer Bats
- Michael Peters (designer) (born 1941), British designer
- Michael Peters (psychologist), Canadian psychologist
- Michael P. Peters, mayor of Hartford, Connecticut
- Mike Peters, a character in the 1996 film Swingers, portrayed by Jon Favreau
