= Jerry Fisayo Bambi =

Nigerian journalist

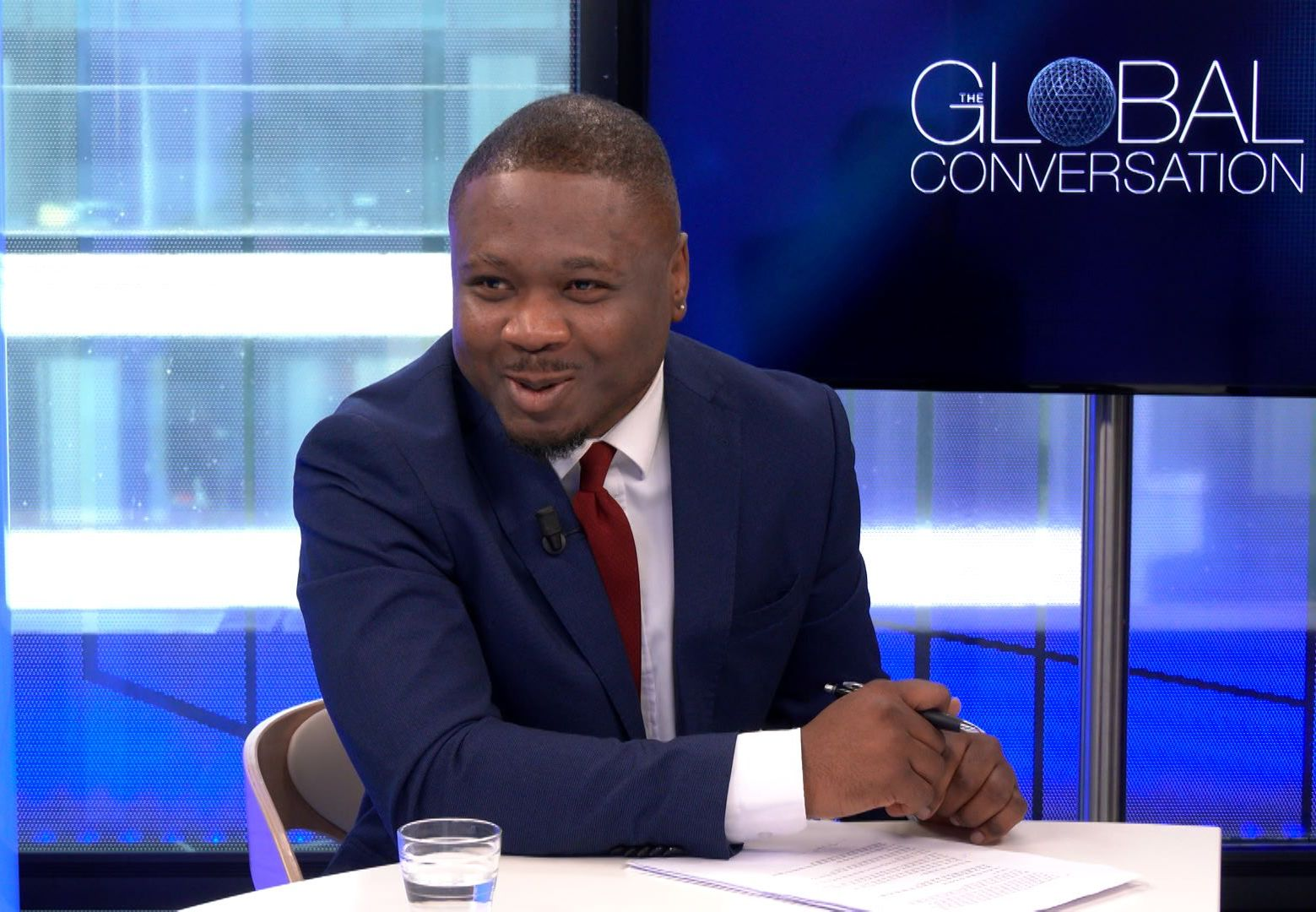
- Jerry in 2025
- Born: Jeremiah Fisayo Bambi; Nigeria
- Occupations: Journalist, show host, news anchor
- Years active: 2011–present
- Known for: Show host on Africanews and Euronews
- Website: fisayobambi.com

Jeremiah Fisayo Bambi (born 8 December 1987) is a Nigerian journalist, producer, news writer, news anchor and showhost on Africanews and Euronews.

== Career ==
For more than a decade, Jerry has been a prominent figure in African journalism, renowned for engaging in meaningful conversations about democracy, governance, and development.

Bambi produces and presents "Inspire Africa", a TV programme with stories of innovation, change and impact in Africa. In 2021, he produced and presented a TV series of The Sahel Women's Empowerment and Demographic Dividend (SWEDD) regional initiative, the result of a joint response by the United Nations and the World Bank Group to help increase women and adolescent girls' empowerment and their access to quality education and reproductive, maternal health services in the Sahel region. He co-hosted the breakfast news programme "The Morning Call" on Africanews, a television news program on politics, culture, education, sciTech, sports and business. He has interviewed government leaders like the former UK Prime Minister Gordon Brown on Britain's role in Nigeria's fight against terrorism, and people from the public and private sector in business and policy making in Africa. He was a key speaker at the EU-African Summit 2021 where he interviewed the European Commissioner for Justice Didier Reynders and former EU Commissioner on Agriculture Phil Hogan.

== Awards ==
Fisayo-Bambi, a one-time shortlisted candidate of the prestigious BBC Komla Dumor Award, was named the Nigeria Achievers Awards 2020 TV personality of the year and inducted into the 2023 Forty Under 40 Wall of Continental leaders in South Africa, categorized under the TV, Radio & Print Journalism.

Later in the same year, (2023) he was awarded the ‘Excellence in Journalism’ prize by the Voice Achievers Award, Almere, Netherlands.

In 2025, Jerry was named the Journalist of the year at the Nigerians in the Diaspora Awards (NIDA) in Paris and listed by the Global Centre for Innovative Leaders (GCIL) in the UK as one of the 100 outstanding global innovative leaders. (https://lagoscityreporters.com/150192-2/)
