= Media City Qatar =

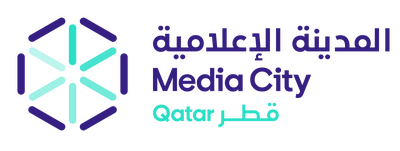

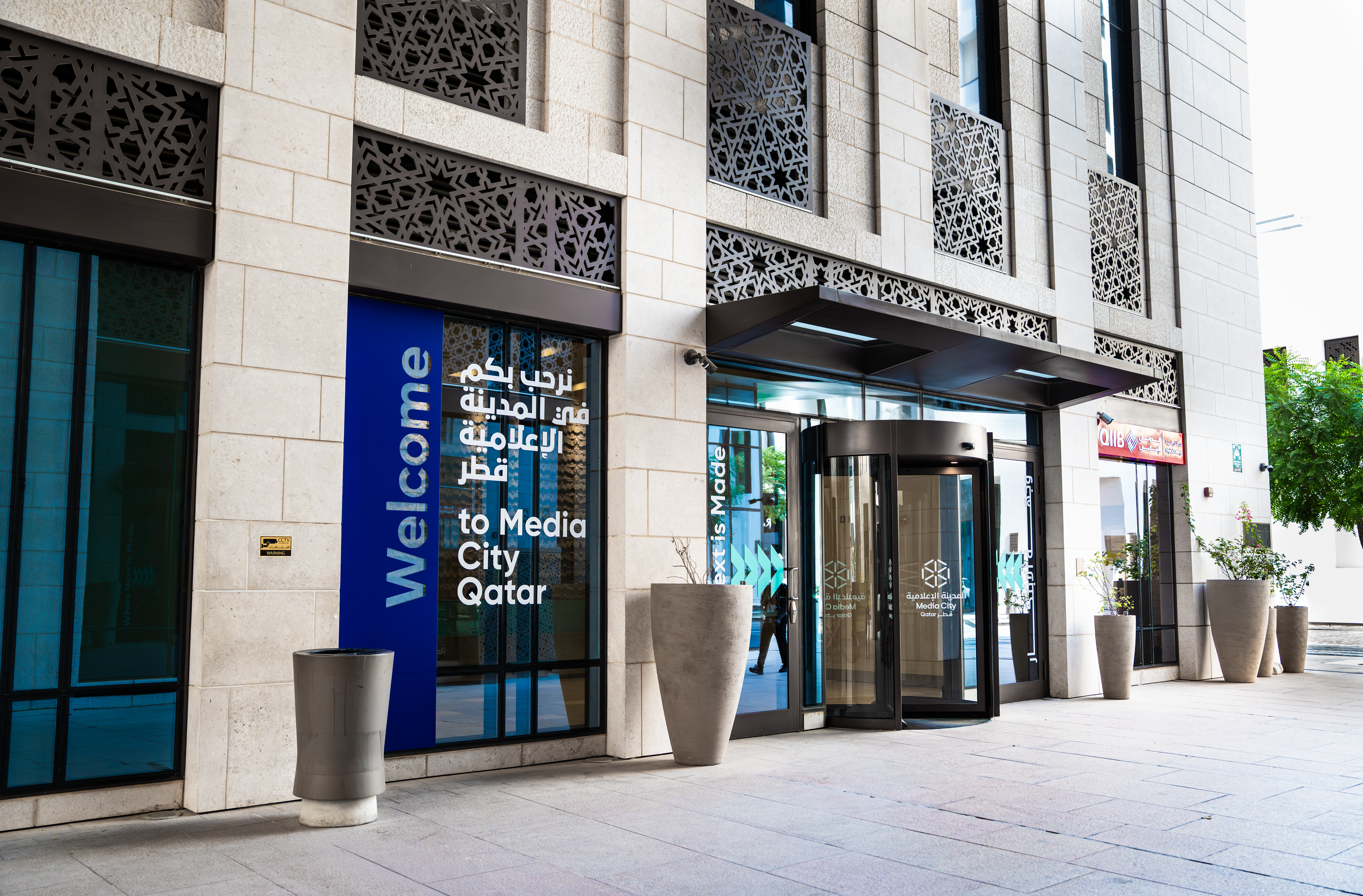
- Founded: May 30, 2019; 7 years ago
- Founder: State of Qatar
- Type: Government-established media zone
- Headquarters: Msheireb Downtown Doha, Qatar
- Owner: Government of Qatar
- Key people: Abdulla bin Ali Al Thani (Chairman); Hamad Omar A. Al-Mannai (CEO)
- Website: mediacity.qa/en/

Media City Qatar is a government-established media hub located in Qatar. It was founded in 2019 through Amiri Law No. 13 of 2019 and serves as a regulator, developer, and investor for media and creative industries.

Media City Qatar operates under a specific legal framework offering certain incentives, including full foreign ownership and tax exemptions.

== Location ==
Media City Qatar's offices are set up in Doha’s business district, West Bay. In September 2024, Media City Qatar confirmed the relocation of its permanent headquarters to Msheireb Downtown Doha.

== History ==
=== 2019–2020 ===
Tamim bin Hamad Al Thani officially established Media City Qatar on May 30, 2019, through Amiri Law No. 13 of 2019. The law created a media-focused zone with its own legal personality and an independent budget.

In its first full year of operation, Media City Qatar focused on establishing frameworks to attract media businesses and build partnerships. It introduced incentives similar to those offered in other Qatari free zones, including zero corporate tax for up to 20 years, full foreign ownership, and streamlined regulations. Pre-approved by Media City Qatar, media companies can register through the Qatar Financial Centre (QFC) and operate under Media City Qatar’s umbrella.

=== 2021–2023 ===
In February 2021, Media City Qatar signed an agreement with the European news organization Euronews which agreed opening a Euronews regional office within Media City Qatar and establishing the Euronews Academy, focused on training media professionals. The academy began offering courses in English and Arabic in partnership with journalism schools and local universities, and Euronews also committed to producing content from Qatar on topics such as business, culture, and current affairs.

In 2022, it signed a multi-year agreement with Singapore-based Group ONE Holdings, known for its mixed martial arts and sports media platform ONE Championship, including co-producing episodes of The Apprentice: ONE Championship Edition Season 2.

=== 2024–present ===
In 2024, Media City Qatar pursued consolidation and introduced new initiatives. In January, it signed a memorandum of understanding with the Qatar Financial Centre Authority (QFCA) to simplify the process of establishing media companies. Under this agreement, the QFC registers firms pre-approved by Media City Qatar, issuing licenses to operate in Qatar. The QFC handles administrative and legal processes, such as company formation and tax matters, while Media City Qatar oversees compliance with media regulations.

In February 2025, CNN and Media City Qatar officials formalized plans to establish a Middle East content hub in Doha. Under the agreement, CNN will establish a Middle East content hub in Media City Qatar, adding to its existing presence in Abu Dhabi and Dubai, which will produce digital content and a weekly program for CNN International. Also in February 2025, Media City Qatar signed an agreement with Huawei at Web Summit Qatar 2025 to develop a smart media campus in Qatar supported by advanced AI infrastructure and cloud-based media platforms.

In April 2025, dpa, a German news agency, expanded its operations in the Middle East and will open an office in Media City Qatar.

In May 2025, Media City Qatar announced that Bloomberg Media will expand its broadcast operations in Qatar by setting up a new expanded studio in Doha. That same month, Microsoft Qatar agreed to contribute to Media City Qatar's Media Innovation Lab and launch joint training programs. Media City Qatar also announced its cooperation with Qatar Development Bank to run acceleration programs and talent development initiatives in Qatar. Additionally, in May 2025, Media City Qatar received the "Innovative Partnership Driving AI Excellence Award" at the Google Cloud Summit Doha 2025, in recognition of its leadership in AI-driven media innovation.

In October 2025, Media City Qatar announced its support for two original Arabic drama series, When I Saw and Behind the Scenes, at MIPCOM Cannes 2025, which are scheduled to air in 2026.

== Legal framework and governance ==
The statute classifies Media City Qatar as an entity empowered to license media businesses and issue regulations. By late 2019, the government appointed a board of directors chaired by Sheikh Abdulla bin Ali Al Thani. Companies register through the Qatar Financial Centre (QFC) but operate under Media City Qatar’s media rules.

In December 2025, Hamad Omar A. Al-Mannai was appointed chief executive officer (CEO) of Media City Qatar.

== Initiatives ==
=== Qatar Economic Forum ===
In September 2020, Media City Qatar signed an agreement with Bloomberg Media to create the annual “Qatar Economic Forum, Powered by Bloomberg,” and the first edition was held in Doha in 2021. During the 2023 Qatar Economic Forum, Media City Qatar extended its partnership with Bloomberg Media through 2027. The 2025 edition was the largest to date with over 3000 participants from more than 90 countries, and during which “The Next, On Air,” an AI-based podcast developed in a joint initiative with Google Cloud, was released.

=== Qatar Esports Forum ===
Media City Qatar also hosts the Qatar Esports Forum which it established with SNRG in May 2024. The second edition was held in 2025, bringing together over 300 participants and representatives from 200 government and international entities.

=== Qatar ArtBeat ===
In December 2024, Media City Qatar and Google Cloud launched "Qatar ArtBeat" for Qatar National Day, which collected over 15,000 public submissions and reached more than 5.4 million people on social media.

=== Qatar SoundBeat ===
In December 2025, Media City Qatar launched Qatar SoundBeat to mark Qatar National Day and premiered the song “Nabd Qatar” during the FIFA Arab Cup Qatar 2025 final at Lusail Stadium before more than 84,000 spectators. The piece was composed by Omar Rahbany, produced by Rahbani 3.0, a Media City Qatar-licensed company, and performed by the Qatar Philharmonic Orchestra.

=== Next in Arts ===
In early 2026, Media City Qatar launched ‘Next in Arts’, a three-year program developed in collaboration with Art Basel Qatar to explore the intersection of art and media and support emerging creative practitioners. The initiative invites local artists to produce mixed-media works responding to the theme “Where Art Meets Media,” with selected works exhibited annually during Art Basel Qatar. The inaugural edition featured The Loudest Grain, a mixed-media installation by interdisciplinary designer Yasamin Shaikhi, exhibited at M7 in Msheireb Downtown Doha from February 5 to 7, 2026. The work, created using biodegradable material derived from rice, explores themes of accumulation and representation through layered visual forms. Submissions were evaluated by a jury comprising representatives from Media City Qatar, Art Basel Qatar, Virginia Commonwealth University School of the Arts in Qatar, and Qatar Museums.
