= Munira Khalif =

American politician

6th United States Youth Observer to the United Nations
- In office August 18, 2017 – July 20, 2018
- Preceded by: Nicol Perez
- Succeeded by: Michael Scott Peters

Personal details
- Born: December 2, 1996 (age 29) Minneapolis, Minnesota
- Education: Harvard University

Munira Khalif (born 1996) is an American student who served as the 6th United States Youth Observer to the United Nations in 2018-2019.

== Early life and career ==
Born and raised in Minneapolis, Minnesota, Khalif is a first-generation Somali-American. She attended Mounds Park Academy for high school and served as commencement speaker, graduating in 2015. Khalif made national headlines in 2015 when she was accepted to all eight Ivy League schools, as well as Georgetown, Stanford and the University of Minnesota.

Khalif currently studies economics and government at Harvard University. Khalif co-founded a youth-run non-profit organization called Lighting the Way, which works to make education more accessible and equitable for girls in East Africa. Khalif is an advisor with GirlUp through the United Nations Foundation.

== Role as U.S. Youth Observer to the UN ==
Khalif was appointed to serve as U.S. Youth Observer to the United Nations in 2017. Created to elevate youth voices in the global policy dialogue, the U.S. Youth Observer to the UN is a role appointed annually by the U.S. Department of State and United Nations Association of the United States of America. As a correspondent between U.S. missions to the UN and American youth, the Youth Observer travels throughout the United States to discover the issues important to young Americans and participates with the U.S. delegation at international organization meetings. Thirty other countries currently have U.N. youth observers.

Munira was awarded the UN Special Envoy for Global Education’s Youth Courage Award, which honors young people fighting for universal education. She was one of nine recipients chosen from around the world to receive the honor. Munira was invited twice to attend the annual White House Iftar dinner, which celebrates Muslim-American trailblazers both in the public and private sector.
