= Nicol Perez =

American politician

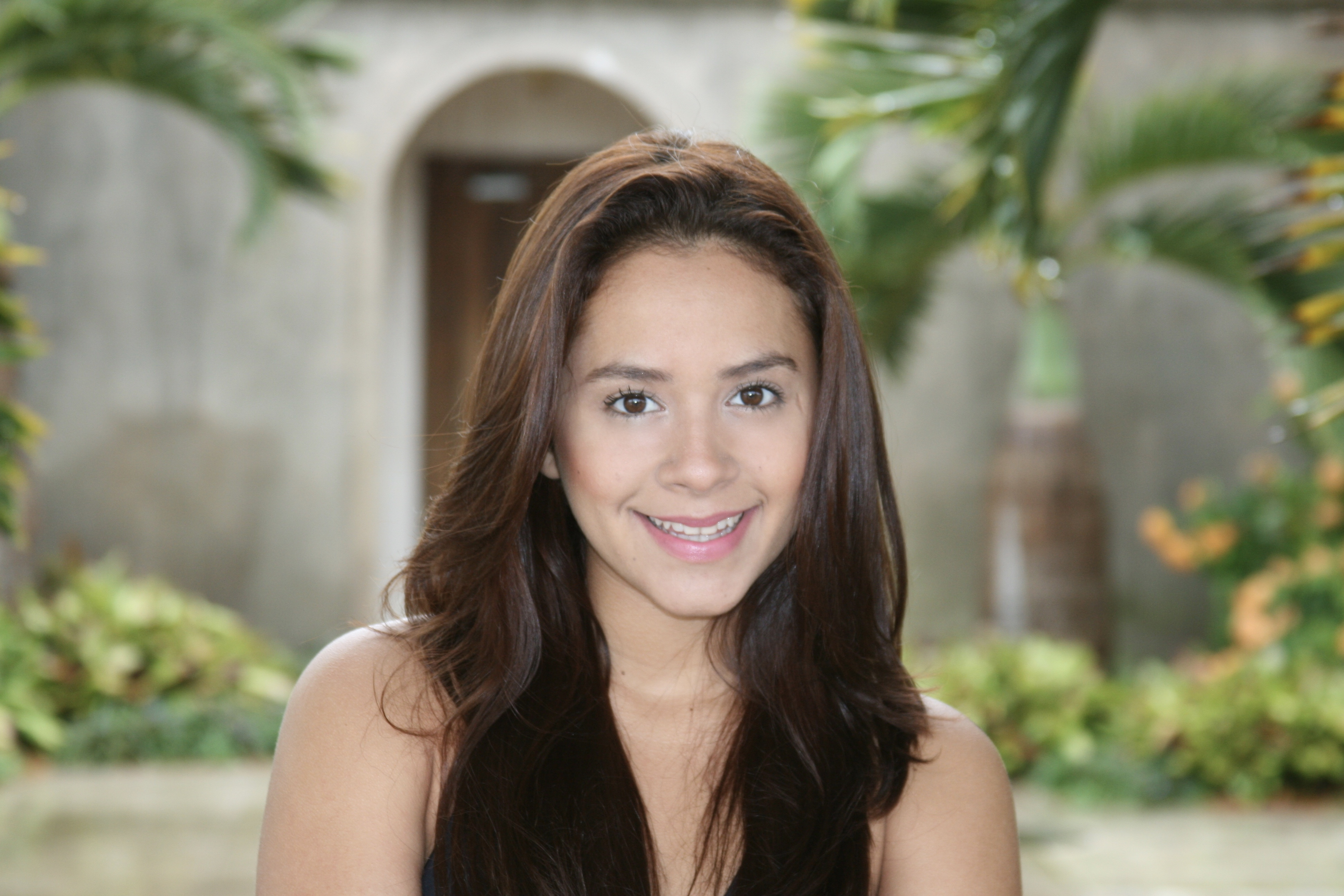
- Nicol Perez in 2013

5th United States Youth Observer to the United Nations
- In office July 21, 2016 – August 18, 2017
- Preceded by: Donya Nasser
- Succeeded by: Munira Khalif

Personal details
- Born: April 22, 1993 (age 32) Santa Cruz, Bolivia
- Education: University of Florida (BS)

Nicol Perez (born April 22, 1993) is the 5th and former United States Youth Observer to the United Nations. Perez has extensive experience working on youth issues at the local, regional and international level having previously worked in various international organizations as well as starting her own initiatives. In her term as Youth Observer, Perez focused on the global refugee crisis, youth unemployment, and the U.N.’s Sustainable Development Goals for 2030. In 2017, Perez founded Girlzftw, a mentorship program that pairs women under 30 with high school and college girls that need the support and encouragement of another girl to achieve their goals.

== Early life and career ==
Born in Santa Cruz, Bolivia, Perez immigrated to the US at age seven.

Perez graduated from the University of Florida, where she was president of Nourish International, a student-run, non-profit organization that works towards making a sustainable impact on communities around the world. During her time at university, Perez spearheaded a project in Guatemala City, alongside 3 other students, where they taught business classes to a group of 50 single mothers living in extreme poverty and provided them with the tools and skills needed to start their own businesses. At University, Perez spent a semester leading business ventures around campus to raise money to start a Goat farm in Uganda. Later, Perez studied abroad in Bangkok, Thailand where she volunteered with the Mechai Viravaidya Foundation for a semester.

After college, Perez lived in Maastricht, The Netherlands, where she worked with Enactus, a global non-profit that provides an entrepreneurial platform for youth to create sustainable community development projects. Later, Perez moved to New York City and was part of the Emerging Leaders program at Nielsen. Perez currently resides in San Francisco, California, where she is a Product Marketing Manager on Civic Engagement at Facebook.

=== Role as U.S. Youth Observer to the UN ===
Created to elevate youth voices in the global policy dialogue, the U.S. Youth Observer to the UN is a role appointed annually by the U.S. Department of State and UN Association of the USA. As a correspondent between U.S. missions to the UN and American youth, the Youth Observer travels throughout the United States to discover the issues important to young Americans and participates with the U.S. delegation at international organization meetings. Thirty other countries currently have U.N. youth observers.
