= Michael Peters (media executive) =

French-German media executive

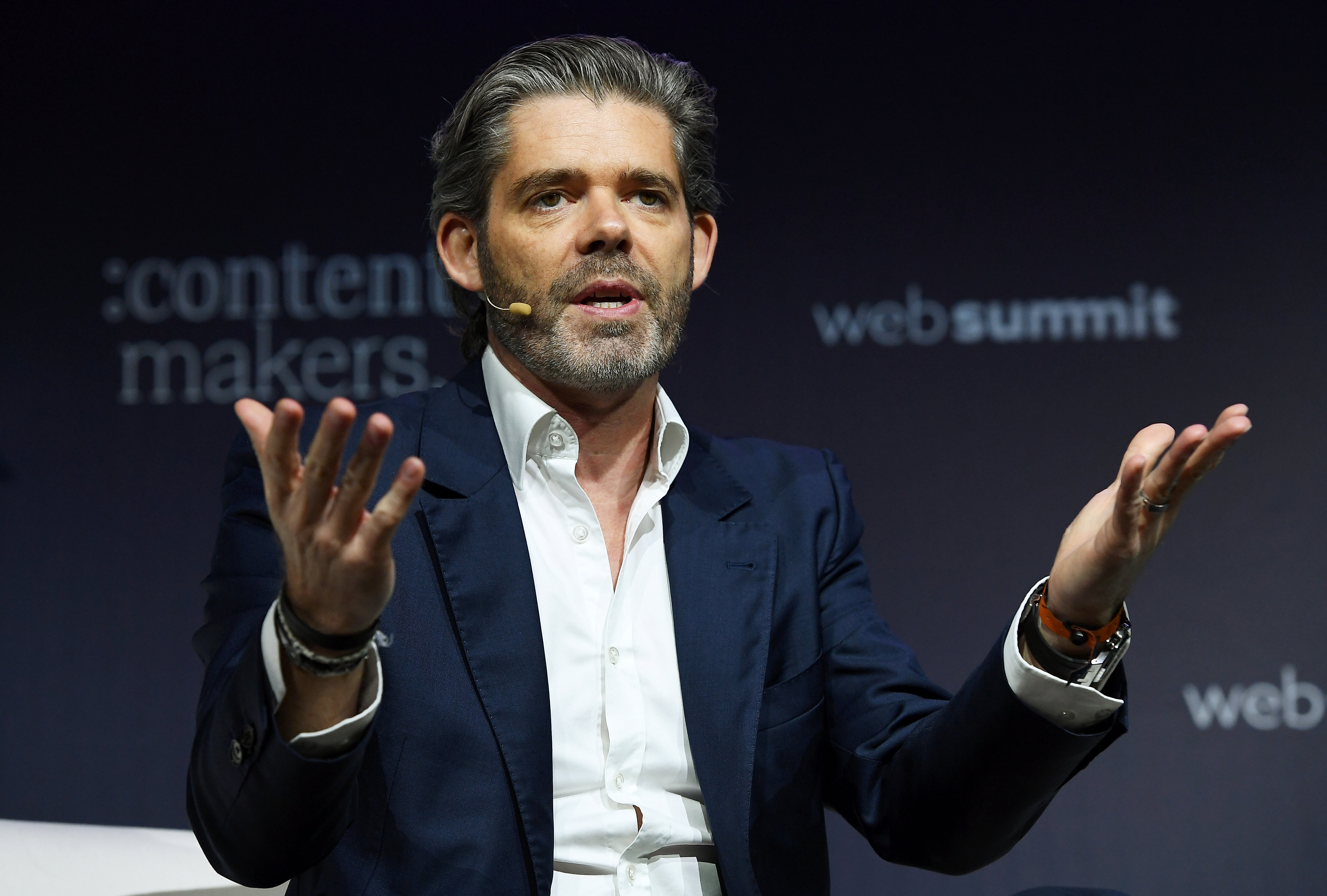
Michael Peters (2018)

Michael Peters (born 1971 in Flensburg, West Germany) is a Franco-German media executive who was chief executive officer (CEO) of Euronews from 2011 to 2021.

== Early life and education ==
Peters is the son of a French mother who worked as a teacher and a German father who served in the German airforce. He earned a master's degree in Financial Engineering from EM Lyon business school in 1995.

== Career ==
Peters started his professional career at auditing firm Arthur Andersen in Lyon. He worked for the company from 1995 to 1998. Peters then joined Euronews as a finance manager in 1998. He was promoted to chief financial officer in 2000 and was named Euronews' Deputy Managing Director in December 2003. From May 2005 to December 2008, Peters held the position as managing director of Euronews, before being appointed managing director of the executive board of Euronews SA in December 2008.

In December 2011, he became Euronews' executive chairman of the board. During his tenure, Media Globe Networks, managed by Naguib Sawiris, became the Euronews majority owner in July 2015. In October 2015, Euronews opened its new headquarters in Lyon, and introduced the Euronews Next digital initiative aimed at reaching younger audiences.

Peters, together with journalist Stephen Smith, started developing the Euronews subsidiary Africanews in 2013. He was appointed president of Africanews SASU on its foundation in 2014 or 2015, leading the network through its digital launch on 4 January 2016 and as its CEO.

Peters left his position as chairman of the Euronews executive board in December 2021 and was appointed Euronews' chairman of the board of directors. Peters held this position until December 2022.

He became the CEO of the company BusiNext, again working alongside Naguib Sawiris. Peters was named CEO of UAE based business and investment plattform Moniify, which was launched by Naguib Sawiris in November 2024.
