= Euronews =

Pan-European news television channel

- Country: Europe
- Broadcast area: Europe; International
- Headquarters: Lyon, France

Programming
- Language: Various
- Picture format: 1080i HDTV (downscaled to 16:9 576i for the SDTV feed)

Ownership
- Owner: Euronews SA
- Sister channels: Africanews

History
- Launched: 1 January 1993; 33 years ago

Links
- Webcast: Euronews website livestream (except in Turkey, Singapore, China, Cuba, and North Korea); Plex livestream (worldwide)
- Website: euronews.com

Availability

Terrestrial
- Levira (Estonia): 17 (MUX6) (in Russian)
- RTBF (Belgium): 42 (in French)
- Fetch TV (Australia): 276 (in English)
- Rogers Cable (Canada): 119 (in English)

Euronews is a pan-European television news network, headquartered in Lyon, France. It is a provider of livestreamed news, which can be viewed in Europe and North Africa via satellite, and in most of the world via its website, on YouTube, and on various mobile devices and digital media players.

The network began broadcasting on New Year's Day 1993 and covers world news from a European perspective. Euronews is currently majority-owned by Alpac Capital.

== History ==
=== Timeline ===
==== Background ====
In 1992, following the Persian Gulf War, during which CNN's position as the preeminent source of 24-hour news programming was cemented, the European Broadcasting Union (EBU) proposed a channel to present information from a counterpart European perspective.

Euronews was founded by a consortium of ten EBU members (national public broadcasters), titled SOCEMIE (French: Société éditrice de la chaîne européenne multilingue d'information Euronews):

- CyBC, Cyprus
- ERTU, Egypt
- France Télévisions, France
- RAI, Italy
- RTBF, Belgium
- RTP, Portugal
- RTVE, Spain
- TMC, Monaco
- Yle, Finland

The Swiss public broadcaster SRG SSR was admitted later as a non-founding member. The BBC and German public broadcasters ARD and ZDF opted not to join.

The French city of Lyon was chosen to host the broadcaster's headquarters, out of a variety of candidates also including Munich, Bologna and Valencia. At launch, language services were provided via sound multiplex.

==== Launch, geographic and linguistic expansion (1993–2015) ====
The inaugural Euronews broadcast was on 1 January 1993 from Écully, Lyon. In 1996, an additional broadcast studio was set up in London.

In late 1997, the British news broadcaster ITN purchased a 49% share of Euronews for £5.1 million from Alcatel-Lucent. ITN supplied the content of the channel along with the remaining shareholders.

A part-time Arabic-language service was briefly operated from April 1997, with a two-year grant from the European Commission, comprising eight journalists and freelancers. After the tender expired, it ceased broadcasting on 15 April 1999.

In 1999, the broadcast switched from solely analogue to mainly digital transmission. The same year, a Portuguese audio track was added.

In 2001, the All-Russia State Television and Radio Broadcasting Company (VGTRK) acquired a 1.8% stake in SOCEMIE. A Russian-language service was launched later in the year.

In April 2003, ITN sold its stake in Euronews as part of its drive to streamline operations and focus on news-gathering rather than channel management.

On 6 February 2006, Ukrainian public broadcaster Natsionalna Telekompanya Ukraïny purchased a one percent interest in SOCEMIE.

In 2007, Euronews won the European Commission's tender for an Arabic-language news channel, with a service agreement being signed on 6 December. A new Arabic service would eventually be launched in July 2008.

On 27 May 2008, Spanish public broadcaster RTVE decided to withdraw from the Euronews consortium, citing legal requirements to maintain low debt levels through careful spending and prioritisation of its existing international channel as a factor influencing its decision to leave. In February 2009, Turkish public broadcaster TRT purchased 15.70% of the channel's shares and became the fourth main partner after France Télévisions (23.93%), RAI (21.54%), and VGTRK (16.94%), while also joining its supervisory board.

New language services included Turkish in January 2010, Persian in October 2010, and Ukrainian in August 2011.

A short-lived Polish service was launched in mid-2011 to mark Poland's assumption of the Presidency of the Council of the European Union, although only some selected evening broadcasts were translated. It was discontinued in January 2012. The service was briefly reestablished in September 2012 in the form of a 15-minute programme broadcast on private television channel TTV three times a day during weekdays. The Polish service survived in this form until the end of 2013.

The channel began broadcasting in widescreen in January 2011, in concert with France 24.

External videos
- 20th anniversary broadcast (2013)

==== Media Globe Networks ownership (2015–2016) ====
Former Euronews headquarters in Lyon

In February 2015, the channel's executive board approved a bid by Media Globe Networks, owned by Egyptian telecom magnate Naguib Sawiris, to acquire a 53% controlling stake in the media outlet. The deal raised questions over Euronews's future editorial posture and independence.

On 13 March 2015, it was announced that Inter Media Group, owned by pro-Russian Ukrainian oligarch Dmytro Firtash, had purchased the Ukrainian service. In response, the government of Ukraine, citing suspected bias, revoked its broadcasting license and dropped its funding. Firtash later abandoned the project, resulting in the department shutting down and leaving 17 journalists redundant. The Russian service, which was financed by the government of Russia, refused to provide jobs to the journalists, violating French labour legislation. The management explained that not hiring any Ukrainian journalists was a specific instruction from VGTRK.

In October 2015, Euronews moved to a new headquarters complex in the Lyon district of La Confluence, designed by Paris-based architecture firm Jakob + MacFarlane and covering a floor area of 10,000 m^{2} (2 1/2 acres). The decision to move was announced in 2011, prior to the Media Globe Networks purchase.

In 2016, Euronews SA was co-owned by Media Globe Networks, regional authorities (Lyon Metropolis, Rhône, Auvergne-Rhône-Alpes) and the following broadcasters:

- ČT, Czech Republic
- CyBC, Cyprus
- ENTV, Algeria
- ERTU, Egypt
- ERT, Greece
- ETT, Tunisia
- France Télévisions, France
- PBS, Malta
- RAI, Italy
- RTBF, Belgium
- RTÉ, Ireland
- RTP, Portugal
- RTVSLO, Slovenia
- SNRT, Morocco
- SRG SSR, Switzerland
- TRT, Turkey
- TV4, Sweden
- TVR, Romania
- UA:PBC, Ukraine
- VGTRK, Russia
- Yle, Finland

==== NBC partnership (2016–2022) ====
In November 2016, the channel's executive board was in talks with NBCUniversal, the parent company of NBC News, for a "strategic partnership". NBCU would acquire 15 to 30% ownership of the Euronews network, would contribute to Euronews content, and facilitate NBC News' expanded operations in Europe. After successful negotiations with the European Commission, who feared that the partnership would result in an "Americanization" of Euronews, the NBCUniversal News Group finalised its purchase of a 25% stake in Euronews in February 2017 for €25 million ($30 million). NBC News president Deborah Turness was appointed to head up international operations, and incumbent Euronews CEO Michael Peters, who had led it since 2004, became CEO of the new partnership. Both reported directly to NBC News chairman Andrew Lack. The resulting partnership became known as Euronews NBC.

Although Naguib Sawiris and NBC News had the largest stakes in Euronews, editorial control by SOCEMIE members was assured, with the broadcasters having seven slots in the editorial board, as opposed to Sawiris' company (which has three slots) and NBC News, which only has one, thereby reducing rumors of an "Americanization" of Euronews' values. Editorial control is fully handled by Euronews' teams, with NBC only focusing on planning and coordinating tasks. After the formation of the partnership, video reports from NBC News' properties and correspondents began to appear frequently on the TV channel and reports from NBCNews.com began to be distributed on its digital platforms.

On 9 May 2017, Euronews began a process of splitting its services into twelve separate editions for each language, of which nine have a linear TV channel retaining their respective voiceover, but now including the on-screen ticker and most lower thirds in the local language. The glocal strategy allows the language editorial teams to personalize the content and presentation of their channel, not only by sharing own-produced content with other languages but by producing content that is relevant to local audiences and allowing local reporters and presenters to appear on camera in all its language editions. The splitting process finished on 24 May 2017.

The language split resulted in the discontinuation of satellite distribution for the newly-created German, Spanish, Portuguese and Turkish channels, now being only available via fiber-optic IP uplink. The discontinuation of the German-language channel on satellite in particular generated outcry from many German satellite TV owners, resulting in its restoration on the Astra 1L satellite on 25 July 2017, via an unencrypted SD feed sitting alongside the French-language channel. Additionally, the Arabic and Persian-language editions were relegated to an online-only distribution on Euronews' website and apps and major social media networks, with TV broadcasting being discontinued. This later also applied for the Turkish-language edition, following discontinued support from TRT, who wanted to prioritise its own international news channel, TRT World. Furthermore, the Ukrainian edition was discontinued outright, due to lack of funding from the Ukrainian government, as well as due to the controversy surrounding the ownership of its broadcasting licence. Finally, the Euronews channel in English would become known as the World edition, and distribution to premises in the American continent via fiber-optic IP uplink was set to begin later in 2018. These changes caused the elimination of 43 staff positions, mainly from the Ukrainian edition, causing major layoffs and leading to production staff having more flexible roles.

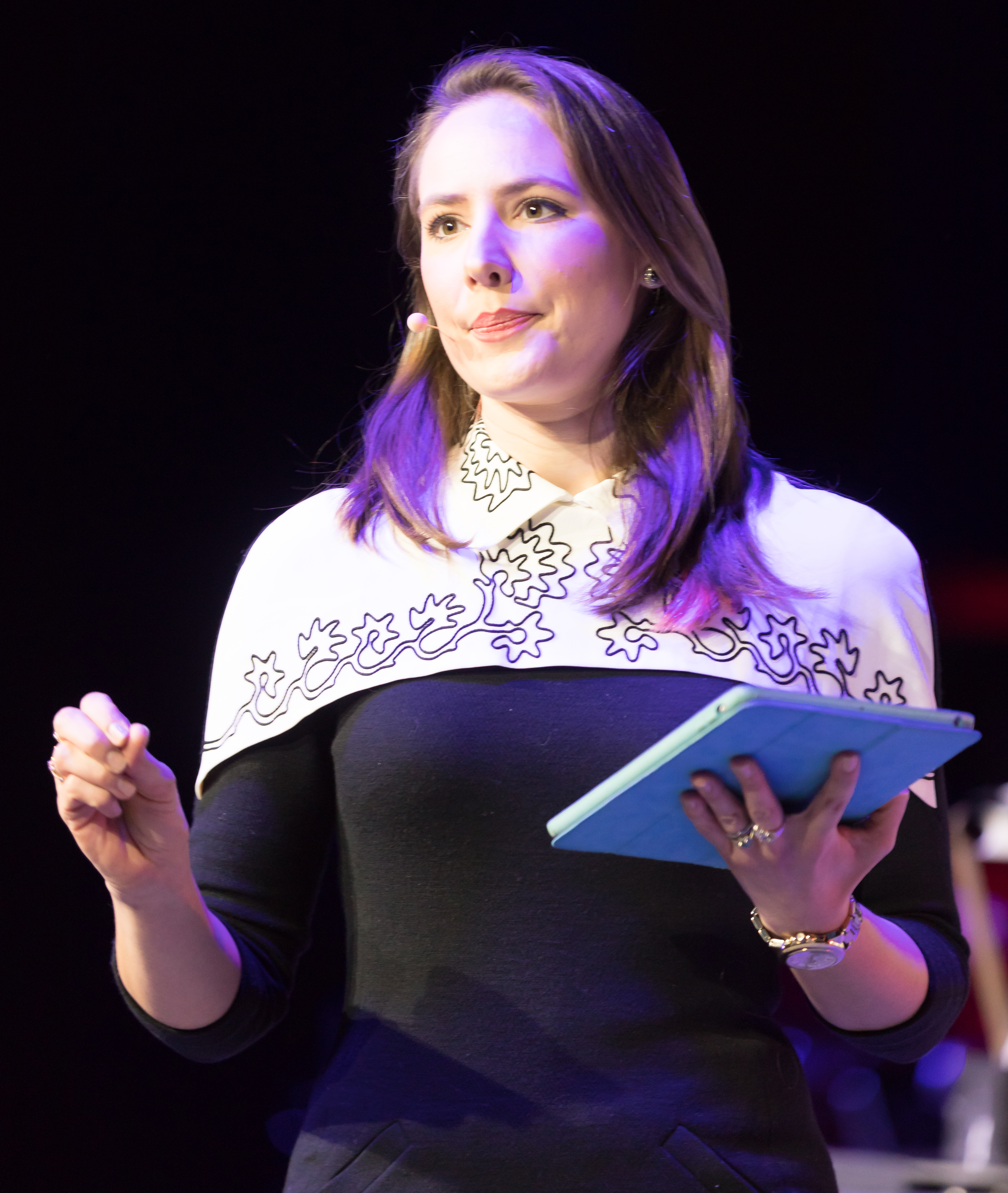
Good Morning Europe anchor Belle Donati

In 2018, Euronews' English-language channel began to gradually revamp its programming schedule, with the roll-out of a new slate of presenter-led programming to complement its already existing shows, a move that was reported earlier in the year, after the success of its presenter-led special reports and weekly programming introduced in recent years. Alongside conventional rolling news shows with newsreaders, debate programming, talk shows, and new presenter-led long-form shows began to be offered during the weekly schedule, and throughout programs, Euronews reporters from different nationalities will be offering context on stories close to their respective home nationalities.

The roll-out began on 22 May, when Euronews debuted the first of these new shows, Good Morning Europe, a five-hour morning show which airs every weekday morning from 7 am. It was first anchored by former RT correspondent and TVB Pearl news presenter Tesa Arcilla, who anchored it on a temporary basis. Some weeks later, former France 24 presenter Belle Donati began presenting the show, alternating with Arcilla; after she moved to Brussels in September, she became the main anchor of the slot. Two months later, on 17 July, Euronews debuted a six-hour breaking news show, Euronews Now, anchored by Tokunbo Salako, covering the dayside and afternoon slots. On 3 September, the new evening program lineup was launched, starting with a politics-focused show, Raw Politics, hosted from Brussels by Tesa Arcilla, and featuring former Sky News reporter Darren McCaffrey. It also spawned a weekly spin-off, Raw Politics: Your Call, a phone-in show which featured European Parliament members answering viewers' questions by phone or social media. The show was dropped over a year later, in October 2019, due to low viewership, with its content being integrated into the rolling news programming. Two weeks after the launch of Raw Politics, on 17 September, the full roll-out was completed with the introduction of a 5-hour evening rolling news show, Euronews Tonight, initially presented by former Sky News and BBC News presenter Sam Naz, and later by Euronews veteran Isabelle Kumar, who has worked with the channel since 2003. The traditional pre-produced blocks of video content still remained on some late-nights and weekends. Most overnights by this point repeated the previous day's edition (either full or half-length) of Euronews Now.

New weekly programming was also produced, including the weekly interview series Uncut, which feature conversations from political leaders and newsmakers worldwide with minimum to no editing. The first episodes featured Franco-German politician Daniel Cohn-Bendit interviewing former UKIP leader Nigel Farage and former UK Prime Minister Tony Blair about Brexit. Additionally, a new social media unit was created, with journalists with a background on digital news verification leading it. The newly created team helped to produce The Cube, a social media segment during rolling news shows, focusing on analysis on treatment and reactions about news headlines on social media, with special attention at the major stories of the day. No Comment, a long-standing element of Euronews' programming, remains on the channels' schedule, and it was gradually integrated into the rolling news shows on the English-language channel.

Additionally, a major investment in mobile reporting via iPhone devices helped Euronews gain a major scoop, becoming the only TV news outlet worldwide to broadcast live coverage from the MV Aquarius, with Paris correspondent Annelise Borges (formerly with France 24) on assignment. Borges broadcast live for 10 days as the Italian government denied the Aquarius access to Italian ports. The coverage made headlines on many news outlets worldwide and helped Euronews augment its credibility and its audience. The new Euronews also hired new correspondents in London, Berlin, Moscow, Rome, Madrid and Washington D.C., and gained access to NBC News' large network of correspondents worldwide.

As of September 2018, the other language editions were unaffected, with the pre-produced blocks of video content remaining at all times. Programming dayparts were later named with proper translations of the existing daypart programming of the World edition (i.e. the evening daypart being named Euronews am Abend, Euronews Noite, Euronews Soir...). There were plans to introduce presenter-led programming during the morning slots on these other channels, eventually, the evening daypart in most of the language-specific channels became presenter-led by late 2018; all of these editions were pre-recorded and pre-produced before broadcast, and eventually looped through the night.

By 2019, several of the newly-launched anchored programmes, including Raw Politics, had been cancelled, and the network began facing a liquidity crisis, with its estimated value having fallen to €3.7 million from its previous worth of €67 million in 2015, according to the French magazine Capital. On 20 April 2020, it was reported that NBCUniversal had sold its stake in Euronews to Media Globe Networks for €3 million, giving the latter an overall majority share of 88%. NBCUniversal's parent company Comcast had recently acquired pan-European satellite service Sky Group, and was prioritizing a collaboration between NBC News and Sky News on a new international news channel. The proposed service was scrapped in August during the COVID-19 pandemic in Europe, with the project no longer considered commercially viable.

==== Post-NBC, Alpac Capital ownership, relocation to Brussels (2022–present) ====
In November 2020, French newspaper Libération stated in an online article that Euronews had been producing an increasing amount of magazine content focusing on Dubai, and sponsored by the Dubai tourism board, which had allegedly caused staff discontent. Segments dedicated to Dubai were found to only have a brief sentence in small print indicating their sponsorship, which a Euronews spokesperson argued met French broadcast standards, rather than using the logo of the relevant institution as with other sponsored content. The article noted that this was likely a result of continued private divestment leading to influence from the International Media Investments (IMI) corporation, owned by Sheikh Mansour bin Zayed Al Nahyan of the ruling royal family of Abu Dhabi, which "discreetly" became a shareholder in 2017 and then signed a memorandum with Euronews the following year. The network would later conduct similar partnerships with Media City Qatar and the Saudi Tourism Authority, both state-owned, to produce relevant sponsored segments.

During the 2020s, Euronews launched a series of online verticals dedicated to specific interests, citing a digital strategy. These include Euronews Green, Euronews Travel, Euronews Next, and Euronews Culture.

In December 2021, reports surfaced that Lisbon-based Alpac Capital would buy an 88% controlling stake in Euronews from Egyptian telecoms magnate Naguib Sawiris. The sale was met with scrutiny as Alpac is allegedly linked to Prime Minister Viktor Orbán of Hungary through Mário David (the father of Alpac Capital's CEO Pedro Vargas David), who is a long-time associate, advisor and friend to Orbán. The acquisition was partly financed by funds from the Hungarian state, which asserted that the purchase would counter the media's "left-wing bias". According to Ágnes Urbán, director of the think tank Mertek Media Monitor, Euronews risked being exploited as a "pseudo-independent" media outpost of the government of Hungary, where it maintains a semblance of independence, but takes a "far less critical" stance with regard to Hungary and other so-called illiberal democracies. Euronews CEO Michael Peters and several of the network's employees subsequently affirmed that the new partnership would not encroach on its editorial independence. The purchase was finalised in July 2022, following approval from the French government. Guillaume Dubois, a former broadcasting director at LCI, took over as CEO in June 2022, prior to the purchase's completion.

By the end of 2022, all remaining in-vision anchors had been phased out of weekday news bulletins, effectively returning to the traditional voiceover format; some cancelled shows were reportedly still cited in programme guides. Four veteran owners of the network (SRG SSR and founding public broadcasters France Télévisions, RTBF and RAI) had ceased to be shareholders by September 2022. As of July 2023, Euronews now lists only four shareholders on its "About us" page, with Alpac Capital owning 97.6%.

In early 2023, Euronews refreshed its on-air identity and schedule to commemorate its thirtieth anniversary, with less emphasis on the in-vision presentation introduced in 2018. On-screen branding was tailored to be optimised for mobile viewing and appended by a side strip of tweets sourced from different news outlets. Later in 2023, the network announced it would begin relocating its principal and editorial headquarters to Brussels, creating one hundred new positions there, including 70 reserved for journalists, and eliminating 198 staff positions in Lyon in the process. 142 jobs would remain based in Lyon, including those of the Russian and Persian-language editorial teams. In addition, the previous headquarters complex in Lyon would be closed and sold. The French National Syndicate of Journalists union said the move would lead to Euronews becoming a "half empty shell", and a weakening of the "pluralism of information".

In October 2024, Dubois was fired from his position as CEO and replaced by former Axel Springer Managing Director Claus Strunz. Employees raised concerns over Strunz's pro-Israel and anti-immigrant stance on Twitter.

At the end of 2024, Euronews relaunched its Polish-language website, announcing the launch of a local service on 15 January 2025. Unlike the previous incarnation, the new Polish service is to be a permanent addition as the 18th language, which in turn is to confirm the involvement of well-known Polish journalists in the project. The launch of the service again coincided with Poland taking over the Presidency of the Council of the European Union.

Euronews's Persian-language linear television service resumed broadcasting on 10 June 2025 via online streaming platforms, with distribution by satellite providers to be offered at a later date.

=== Former programming ===
- Good Morning Europe (Note: In other languages: French: Europe Matin; Hungarian: Jó Reggelt Európa; Russian: Доброе утро Европа) - discontinued from February 2023
- Euronews Tonight (Note: In other languages: French: Euronews Soir; German: Euronews am Abend; Italian: Euronews Sera; Portuguese: Euronews Noite; Russian: Новости к этому часу) – discontinued from February 2023
- Prime Edition – discontinued from 2019
- Late Edition – discontinued from 2019
- Global Weekend – discontinued from February 2023
- Raw Politics – discontinued from October 2019
- Raw Politics: Your Call – discontinued from October 2019
- Insiders
- Aid Zone
- Global Japan
- Notes from the USA

=== Former radio service ===
On 2 October 2012, Euronews launched Euronews Radio. The service was available for download on the App Store and Google Play, in addition to being available on TuneIn, and was designed for viewers for whom "watching news is not an option" by providing a direct simulcast to the TV channel. To account for the radio format, "No Comment" segments were replaced by music and weather reports were read by a female announcer. The service was shut down in 2020.

=== Former logos ===
January 1993 – February 1996: blue lower case word "euro" in a yellow parallelogram and yellow capital word "NEWS".

February 1997 – October 1998: white lower case word "euro" above and blue lower case word "news" below.

October 1998 – June 2008: blue rectangle enclosing white camel case word "EuroNews".

June 2008 – May 2016: white lowercase word "euronews" below a white circle.

May 2016 – January 2023: silver-white lower case word "euronews", with "news" in a bolder font, followed by a small circle at the foot of the last letter. This variant, with a darker blue colour, was used from May 2016 until November 2022 online and until 31 January 2023 on-air. The current Euronews logo is a modified variation with a lighter blue tone.

== Organisation ==
Euronews SA
- Type: Société anonyme
- Industry: Broadcasting
- Founded: 1992
- Founders: Ten EBU members: CyBC, Cyprus; France Télévisions, France; RAI, Italy; RTBF, Belgium; RTP, Portugal; RTVE, Spain; TMC, Monaco; Yle, Finland; ERTU, Egypt
- Headquarters: Brussels, Belgium
- Key people: Claus Strunz (CEO)
- Brands: Euronews
- Owners: Alpac Capital (97.6%); IMI (Abu Dhabi); SNRT (Morocco); PBS (Malta)
- Subsidiaries: Africanews
- Website: www.euronews.com/about

The channel is operated by a holding corporation known as Euronews SA, which also holds the broadcasting licence. As of July 2023, the Portuguese investment management firm Alpac Capital has a 97.6% stake in Euronews SA.

=== Secondary franchises ===
Since 2018, Euronews has begun licensing its name to various private and public broadcasters and organisations in southern, central and eastern Europe, agreeing to set up localized Euronews channels broadcasting regional, national, European and international news in local languages. The first of these channels was the launch of Euronews Albania.

- Euronews Albania
In 2019, Euronews launched its first franchise through a joint venture with local RTV In in Albania. The new channel, known as Euronews Albania, is based in Tirana, Albania and covers the Western Balkans countries of Albania, Montenegro, Kosovo and North Macedonia.
- Euronews Bulgaria
In 2021, Euronews signed a partnership with TV Europa to launch a channel in Bulgarian. The new channel started broadcasting on 5 May 2022.
- Euronews Georgia
In 2019, Euronews signed a deal with local telecommunications company Silknet to launch a channel in Georgia. The new channel began broadcasting on 31 August 2020.
- Euronews Romania

In 2021, Euronews teamed up with the Politehnica University of Bucharest to launch a channel in Romanian. The new channel started broadcasting on 25 May 2022, and also covers the Republic of Moldova.

In August 2025 Euronews reported that false videos imitating its style were launched continuously in Romania and Moldova.
- Euronews Serbia
In 2019, Euronews teamed up with the media group HD-WIN, owned by the state-owned Telekom Srbija, to launch a channel in Serbian. The new channel started broadcasting on 3 June 2021.

=== Africanews subsidiary ===
In January 2014, Euronews announced a partnership with public broadcaster Télé Congo "under the auspices of the President of the Republic of the Congo, Mr. Denis Sassou Nguesso" to create an African service entitled Africanews. Initially based in Pointe-Noire, its website debuted on 4 January 2016, with the Africanews TV channel eventually launching on 20 April, broadcasting in English and French.

In January 2016, Euronews was accused of plagiarism by the Congolese media group AfricaNews, because the Lyon-based channel used the name "Africanews" for its African subsidiary. However, AfricaNews in the Democratic Republic of Congo has existed since 2005 and can be found on the Internet. Its employees sent letters to DRC authorities and managing director of Euronews, Michael Peters, to change the related name and to avoid using it for the African subsidiary of Euronews.

In 2020, Euronews originally planned to sell Africanews to a group known as Sipromad, but the deal eventually fell through and the two parties entered litigation. As a result, Africanews remained under the ownership of Euronews, but its production was moved from Pointe-Noire to Euronews's headquarters in Lyon with the intention to reduce costs by at least 30%.

=== Bureau locations ===
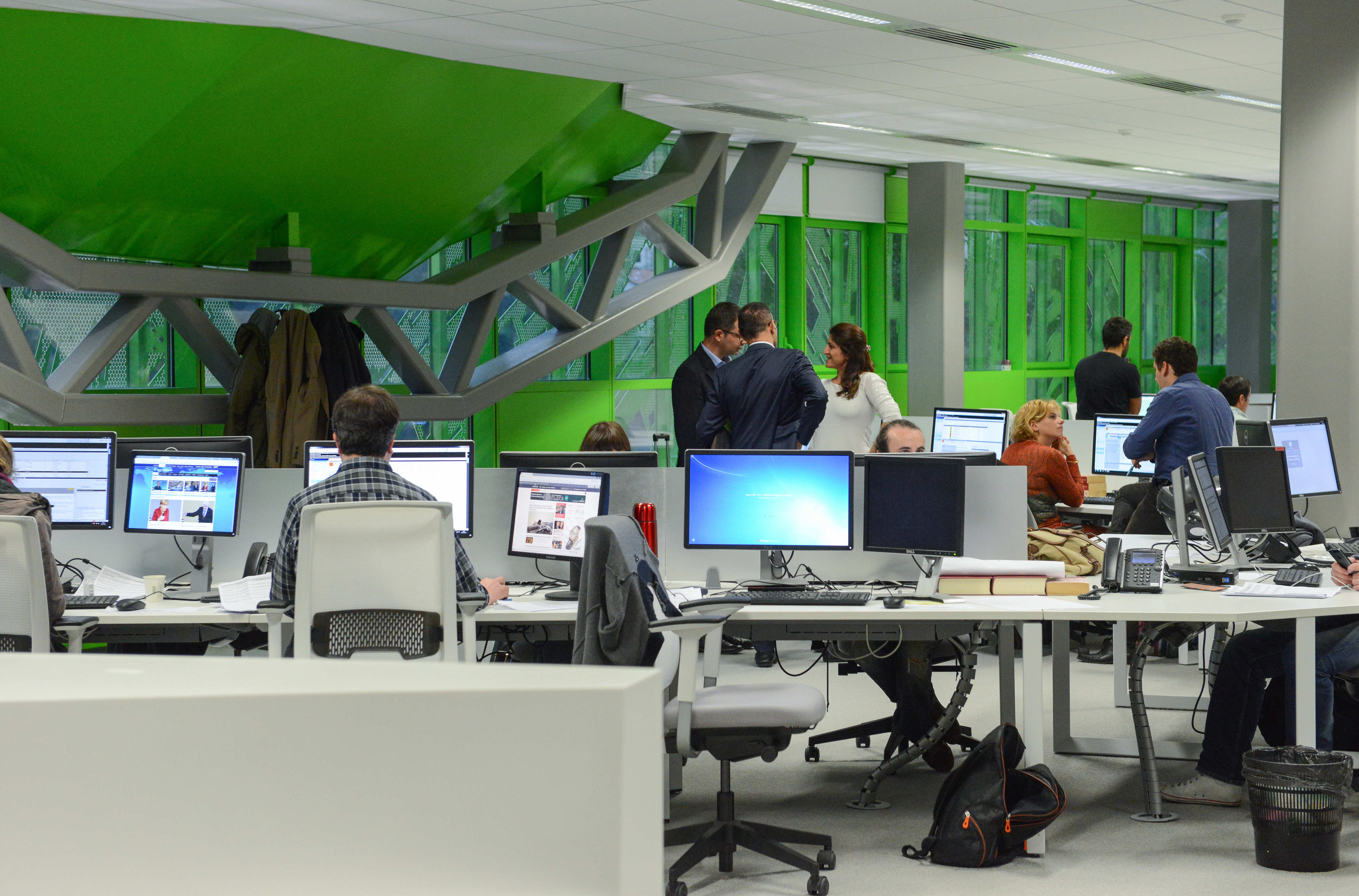
Offices at Euronews headquarters in Lyon, shortly after its opening in 2015

As of 2023, Euronews primarily broadcasts from its headquarters in Lyon, but also maintains international bureaux for editorial or marketing purposes in Athens, Brussels, Berlin, Budapest, Dubai, Johannesburg, London, Luanda, Paris and Singapore.

The company previously had bureaux in Istanbul, Doha, Bucharest and Washington, D.C.

=== Language availability ===
Language	Launched	Closed
English	1 January 1993	—N/a
French	1 January 1993	—N/a
German	1 January 1993	—N/a
Italian	1 January 1993	—N/a
Spanish	1 January 1993	—N/a
Portuguese	1 November 1999	—N/a
Russian	17 September 2001	—N/a
Arabic	1 April 1997; 12 July 2008 (Note: Linear television broadcasts suspended since 31 March 2017)	15 April 1999
Turkish	30 January 2010 (Note: Linear television broadcasts suspended since January 2018)	—N/a
Persian	27 October 2010 (Note: Linear television broadcasts suspended from 1 May 2017 until 10 June 2025)	—N/a
Polish	16 June 2011; 15 January 2025	January 2012
Ukrainian	24 August 2011	22 May 2017
Greek	18 December 2012	—N/a
Hungarian	30 May 2013	—N/a
Albanian	21 November 2019	—N/a
Georgian	31 August 2020	—N/a
Serbian	3 June 2021	—N/a
Bulgarian	5 May 2022	—N/a
Romanian	25 May 2022	—N/a
Kazakh	7 July 2026	—N/a

== Distribution ==
The channel is available in 430 million households in 166 countries worldwide. It reaches more than 170 million European households by cable, satellite and terrestrial. It also began to secure availability on multimedia platforms such as IPTV and digital media.

Euronews launched an application for mobile devices (Android, iPhone, and iPad) which is called "Euronews Live". The application is free of charge and is available on Google Play and the App Store. This app was later shut down quietly.

The channel's programmes are also available by podcast, and it has maintained YouTube channels since October 2007.

High-definition (HD) broadcasting was started on 2 November 2016 via satellite using Hot Bird-capacities (English audio only). Regarding the audio codec, Euronews originally used the AC3 format, before changing to the AAC codec in March 2017, and changing again to the MPEG codec in April 2017.

The following broadcasters have simulcast Euronews through partial timeslots on terrestrial channels:

- Face TV (Bosnia and Herzegovina) in English
- CyBC DTV Platform (Cyprus) in English and Greek (also simulcast by RIK 2 after closedown)
- ERT News (Greece) in English and Greek
- TL (Lebanon) in Arabic daily at 8:00
- RTÉ One, RTÉ2, RTÉ News (Ireland) in English
- Canal Extremadura, Aragón TV, 7RM Murcia (Spain) in Spanish
- TVMNews+ (Malta) in English

In the US, the channel is available for free on the KlowdTV platform.

In 2012, the largest Belarusian state network MTIS stopped broadcasting Euronews for unknown reasons.

In 2013, the new commercial channel Planet TV started broadcasting Euronews dubbed in Slovenian after Antenna TV SL purchased a major stake in the company. Euronews airs after closedown (or sign-off) of Planet TV, but both call sign logos are displayed.

In September 2016, Euronews was removed from the Freesat channel list in the UK, in a move made by Naguib Sawiris.

As of 2021, Euronews is available in the UK, together with a number of other international news channels, via online video subscription service NewsPlayer+ and alongside Africanews on Freeview channel 271 via the Channelbox free streaming service.

In February 2023, the Saudi-based MBC Group added Euronews to its Shahid streaming platform. Satellite distribution of its French-language channel on Astra ceased at the end of the same month.

== Reception ==
=== Belarus ===
In April 2021, the Ministry of Information of Belarus announced that authorities had ceased broadcasting of Euronews within its territory, with its frequencies being taken over by Channel One Russia's Pobeda channel. A ministry spokesperson said that the channel had "violated legislation by running advertisements in English, instead of Russian or Belarusian". In a statement, the network responded that they were not "notified of this decision nor of the reasons for it, and learned of it this morning through the press", adding that it "deeply regret[ed] the decision". A Minsk-based expert assessed that the move deprived Belarusians of an alternative to state-run news outlets.

=== Russia ===
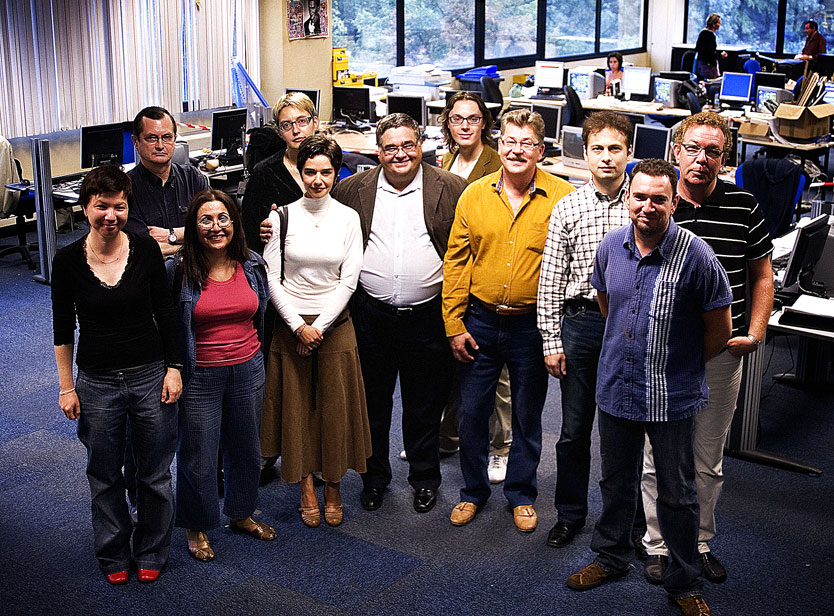
Journalists of the Russian-language editorial team of Euronews in 2006

In May 2016, Russian foreign ministry spokesperson Maria Zakharova accused Euronews of "disinformation" after an online article mistakenly embedded a tweet from a parody account claiming to be foreign minister Sergey Lavrov. Pyotr Fedorov, a member of the Euronews supervisory board representing the Russian state broadcaster VGTRK, referred to the incident as an "unconscious Russophobia characteristic" of English-language journalists.

An October 2016 report broadcast on Russia-1 and produced by correspondent and propagandist Evgeniy Poddubny accused Euronews of producing an "anti-Russian fake about Syria" in the context of the Syrian army offensive during the Battle of Aleppo.

Access to Euronews in Russia, including its online services, was restricted by Roskomnadzor in late March 2022 following the Russian invasion of Ukraine. The channel's signal in Russia was forcibly taken over by Russia-24, before the original frequencies were in turn handed over on 7 April to a new channel operated by state TV journalist Vladimir Solovyov, who was sanctioned by the European Union for his support of the invasion of Ukraine.

=== Ukraine ===
On 14 August 2014, Ukrainian journalist Olha Herasymyuk, then-deputy chairperson of the National Council of Television and Radio Broadcasting of Ukraine, described the Russian-language service of Euronews as having "a propagandistic nature" due to the fact that Russian journalists worked on it.

An online report published by the English-language edition of Euronews in 2018, which depicted children in Russian-annexed Crimea being trained by soldiers to defuse landmines, was criticised by Ukrainian media and officials, including Mykola Tochytskyi, Ukraine's representative to the EU, and Ukrainian foreign ministry spokesperson Mariana Betsa, who also said that reporting "should be based on facts". Lithuanian foreign minister Linas Antanas Linkevičius described the report as "brainwashing".

In 2021, Liubov Tsybulska, the then-chair of the Centre for Strategic Communication and Information Security, said that the "influence of the Kremlin on the supposedly neutral channel is visible not only in Euronews's Russian material, but also in the approach to the presentation of English-language news".

During the Russian invasion of Ukraine, the National Council of Television and Radio Broadcasting of Ukraine appealed to Euronews leadership in June 2022, accusing the network of promoting a pro-Kremlin narrative in its Russian-language broadcasts. In a letter sent to the National Council in response, CEO Guillaume Dubois said it was "unfair that one aspect would be extracted out of the overall rolling coverage to accuse our newsroom of promoting Kremlin narratives", and expressed his "full solidarity" with Ukraine.

== See also ==
- BBC World News
- Eurosport
