= Michael Scott Peters =

American politician

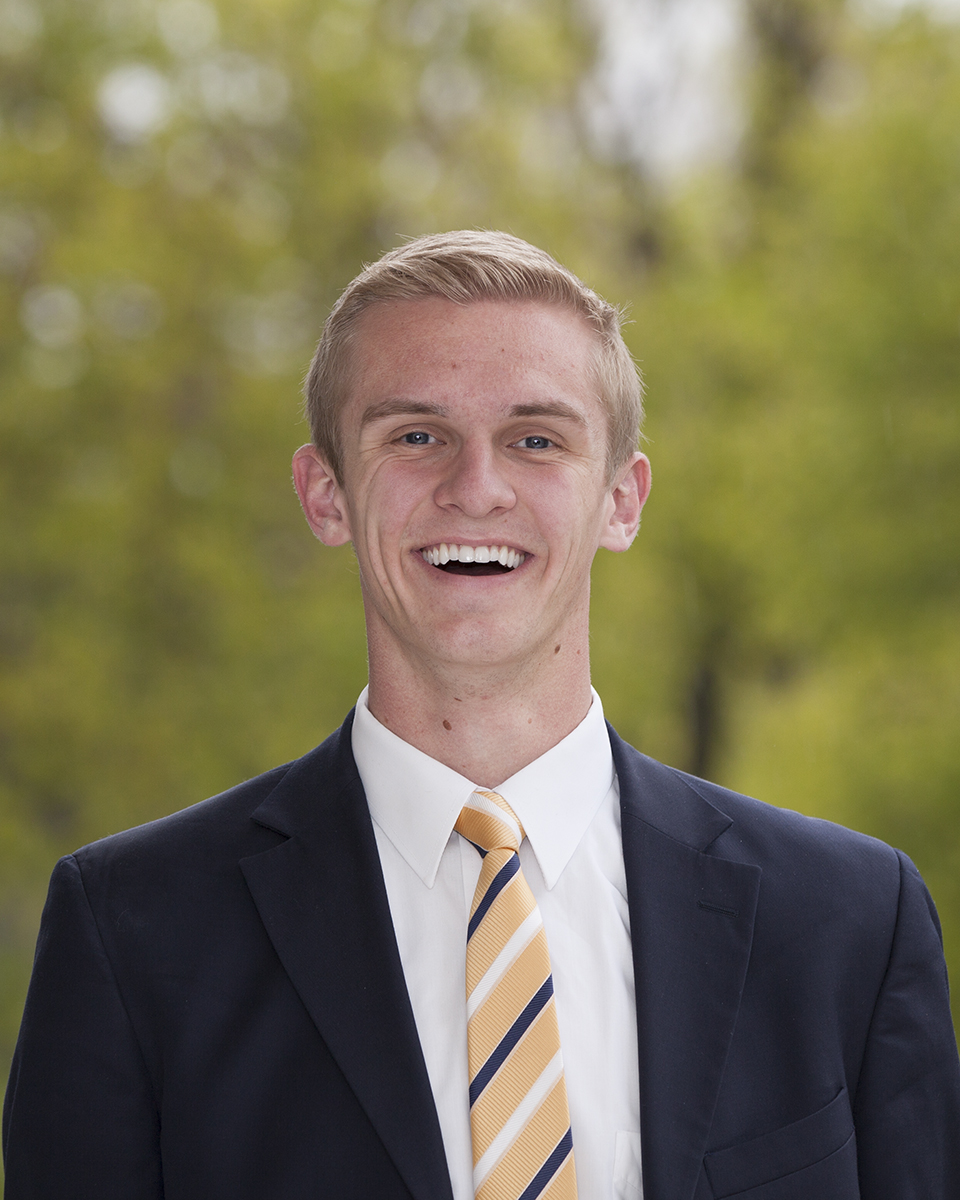

7th United States Youth Observer to the United Nations
- In office July 20, 2018 – September 4, 2019
- Preceded by: Munira Khalif
- Succeeded by: Jay'Len Boone

Personal details
- Born: August 25, 1994 (age 31) West Jordan, Utah, U.S.
- Education: Utah State University
- Occupation: Businessman

Michael Scott Peters was the 7th United States Youth Observer to the United Nations.

Peters graduated summa cum laude from Utah State University with a major in international business. While at the university, he was the Student Body President.

Peters was appointed to serve as U.S. Youth Observer to the United Nations in summer 2018. In the role, Peters has traveled throughout the United States to engage with young Americans and has represented the United States at various international organization meetings.

Peters was a speaker at the 2018 Social Good Summit in New York City and a delegate to the 73rd session of the United Nations General Assembly.
