= Africanews =

African news media service

africanews
- Country: France
- Broadcast area: 32 African countries: Burkina Faso; Burundi; Cameroon; Central African Republic; Chad; Democratic Republic of the Congo; Djibouti; Equatorial Guinea; Gabon; Gambia; Ghana; Guinea; Guinea-Bissau; Ivory Coast; Kenya; Liberia; Madagascar; Mali; Mauritania; Mozambique; Niger; Nigeria; Republic of Congo; Rwanda; Sao Tome; Senegal; Sierra Leone; South Africa; Tanzania; Togo; Uganda
- Headquarters: Lyon, France (formerly Pointe-Noire, Congo)

Programming
- Languages: English, French
- Picture format: 576i (16:9 and 4:3) (SDTV), 1080i (HDTV)

Ownership
- Owner: Euronews

History
- Launched: 20 April 2016; 10 years ago

Links
- Website: www.africanews.com

Availability

Terrestrial
- GOtv: Channel 47
- DStv: Channel 417
- Zuku TV: Channel 524
- AzamTV: Channel 235
- StarTimes: Channel 272

Africanews (styled as africanews) is a 24/7 pan-African multilingual news network located in Lyon, France, previously headquartered in Pointe-Noire, Republic of the Congo. The news channel began broadcasting online, and via TV and satellite on 20 April 2016.

== Broadcast ==
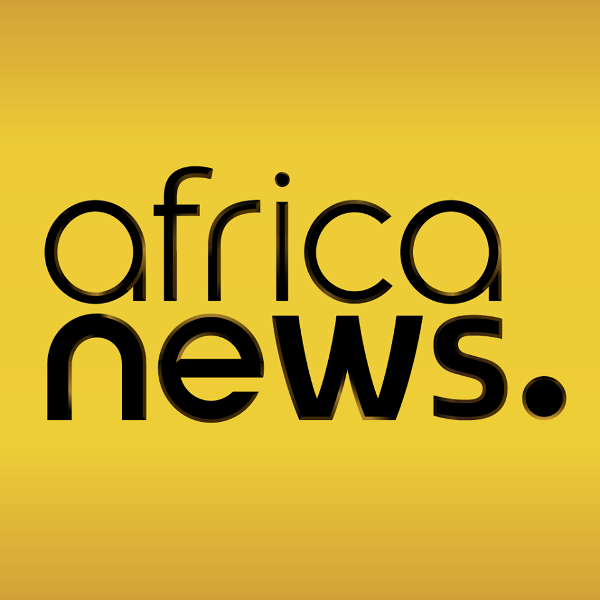
Alternative logo

Like its sister channel Euronews, Africanews runs news and weather summaries every half-hour.

=== Languages ===
Currently, the programs are broadcast in both English and French - most on-screen graphics and captions are bilingual. In 2016, the channel planned to expand and accommodate most of the continents' population and roll out Swahili, Arabic, Dutch/Afrikaans, Spanish and Portuguese content soon.

=== Distribution ===
Availability of Africanews via cable and satellite

The channel currently is broadcast in 33 sub-Saharan countries and is accessible to 7.3 million homes via satellite and digital terrestrial television networks. Africanews is available in the UK, along with a number of other international news channels, via online video subscription service NewsPlayer+ and alongside Euronews on Freeview channel 271 via the Channelbox free streaming service.

== Programmes ==
- Good Morning Africa: Weekday news bulletin from 6am to 11am;
- Daily News: Weekday news bulletin from 11am to 6pm;
- Prime Edition: Weekday news bulletin from 6pm to 11pm;
- The Nightshift: Weekday news bulletin from 11pm to 6am;
- International Weekend: Weekend news bulletin;
- This is Culture!: Daily looks at culture and entertainment;
- Sci_Tech: Latest science and technology news;
- No|Comment: Pictures with no commentaries;
- Météo Africa / Météo World: Your daily weather forecasts;
- The Morning Call: Get all the top stories happened overnight or early mornings, broadcast weekday mornings from 6 to 11 (only one first hour is live, others are pre-recorded);
- Business Africa: Weekly 8-minute roundup on business news and markets in Africa and worldwide, live Thursday nights at 8:15 (with repeats till 11:15 then Friday lunchtime and weekend);
- Football Planet: Weekly 10-minute roundup on football news in Africa and Europe, live Monday nights at 8:15 (with repeats till 11:15 then Tuesday lunchtime);
- Focus: In-depth world reports;
- The Global Conversation: Interview with an Africanews' journalist and an international decision-maker;
- International Edition: Weekly 10-minute analysis of the week's stories that make the headlines, powered by Euronews;
- Markets: Currencies, African markets and commodities;
- Timeout Africa: African events roundup.
