= Deaths in March 2016 =

The following is a list of notable deaths in March 2016.

Entries for each day are listed alphabetically by surname. A typical entry lists information in the following sequence:

- Name, age, country of citizenship and reason for notability, established cause of death, reference.

== March 2016 ==
=== 1 ===
- Carole Achache, 63, French writer, photographer and actress, suicide by hanging.
- Henry Vernon Atherton, 92, American animal scientist.
- Coca Crystal, 68, American television personality and political activist, respiratory failure.
- Adam Dziewonski, 79, Polish-born American geophysicist.
- Ítalo Estupiñán, 64, Ecuadorian footballer (Toluca), cardiac arrest.
- Beatrice Gillam, 96, British naturalist and ecologist.
- Lorenzo Giordano, 52, Canadian mobster, shot.
- Ilir Hoti, 58, Albanian economist and banker, melanoma.
- Gary Hutzel, 60, American visual effects supervisor (Star Trek, Battlestar Galactica, Defiance), heart attack.
- William T. Jarvis, 80, American health educator and skeptic.
- Nestori Kaasalainen, 101, Finnish politician.
- Reijo Kanerva, 72, Finnish footballer.
- Brina Kessel, 90, American ornithologist.
- Jim Kimsey, 76, American technology executive, co-founder and CEO of AOL, melanoma.
- Michi Kobi, 91, American actress (12 to the Moon, Cry for Happy, Courage the Cowardly Dog).
- Martin Legassick, 75, South African historian and activist, cancer.
- Peter Mathias, 88, British economic historian.
- Gayle McCormick, 67, American singer (Smith), cancer.
- Jean Miotte, 90, French abstract painter.
- Stack Pierce, 82, American actor.
- Louise Plowright, 59, British actress (Mamma Mia!, EastEnders, Families), pancreatic cancer.
- Lee Reherman, 49, American actor (American Gladiators, Star Trek Into Darkness, Last Action Hero).
- Mary Ann Scherr, 94, American jewellery designer.
- Frank Terpil, 76, American CIA agent and arms dealer.
- Georgios Tsakanikas, 81, Greek Olympic shot putter (1956, 1960, 1964).
- Tony Warren, 79, English television screenwriter and producer (Coronation Street).
- Martha Wright, 92, American actress (South Pacific, The Sound of Music, Goodyear Television Playhouse) and singer.

=== 2 ===
- Janusz Bolonek, 77, Polish Roman Catholic prelate and diplomat, Apostolic nuncio (1989–2013).
- Chandra Ranaraja, 77, Sri Lankan politician.
- Robert Del Tufo, 82, American attorney, New Jersey Attorney General (1990–1993), lung cancer.
- Noémia Delgado, 82, Portuguese television and film director.
- Tony Dyson, 68, British film prop designer (R2-D2).
- James Anthony Gaffney, 87, British civil engineer.
- Roger Hickman, 61, Australian yachtsman, winner of the Sydney to Hobart Yacht Race (Handicap, 2014), brain cancer.
- Rosemary Hinkfuss, 84, American politician, member of the Wisconsin State Assembly (1988–1994).
- Prince Johann Georg of Hohenzollern, 83, German royal and art historian.
- Dick Hudson, 75, American football player (Buffalo Bills).
- Grégoire Illorson, 61, Cameroonian Olympic sprinter.
- Marion Patrick Jones, 85, Trinidadian writer.
- Arthur Keily, 94, British Olympic marathon runner (1960).
- Benoît Lacroix, 100, Canadian Dominican priest and historian.
- Ghais Malik, 85, Egyptian Anglican prelate, Bishop of Egypt (1984–2000).
- Aubrey McClendon, 56, American energy and basketball executive, CEO of Chesapeake Energy, part-owner of the Oklahoma City Thunder, traffic collision.
- James Barrett McNulty, 71, American politician, Mayor of Scranton, Pennsylvania (1982–1986), cancer and cardiac disorder.
- Allan Michaelsen, 68, Danish football player and coach, brain cancer.
- Sergio Ricossa, 88, Italian economist.
- Reid Scott, 89, Canadian politician and judge.
- Kalidas Shrestha, 93, Nepali artist and academic, pneumonia as a complication from a kidney infection.
- Don Walsh, 81, Australian football player (Collingwood).
- Paul Webley, 62, British educator, president of SOAS, University of London (2006–2015), cancer.
- Władysław Wojtakajtis, 67, Polish Olympic swimmer.
- Reiner Tom Zuidema, 88, American anthropologist.

=== 3 ===
- Ralph Baruch, 92, German-born American media mogul (Viacom).
- Per Beskow, 89, Swedish biblical scholar.
- Lord James Blears, 92, British professional wrestler.
- Rooney L. Bowen, 82, American politician.
- Jack Buckalew, 83, American politician, member of the West Virginia Senate (1995–1998).
- Berta Cáceres, 42, Honduran indigenous leader, shot.
- Anthony Carrigan, 35, British academic, cancer.
- Gavin Christopher, 66, American R&B/hip-hop musician, songwriter and producer, heart failure.
- Martin Crowe, 53, New Zealand cricketer (national team), lymphoma.
- Marcello De Cecco, 76, Italian economist.
- Sir Andrew Derbyshire, 92, British architect.
- Sophie Dessus, 60, French politician, member of the National Assembly for Corrèze's 1st Constituency (since 2012), cancer.
- Ashok Ghosh, 94, Indian politician, General Secretary of All India Forward Bloc (since 1946), lower respiratory tract infection.
- Yves Guéna, 93, French politician, President of the Constitutional Council (2000–2004), High Commissioner of Ivory Coast (1960).
- Hayabusa, 47, Japanese professional wrestler (Frontier Martial-Arts Wrestling), brain hemorrhage.
- Henry R. Horsey, 91, American judge, member of the Delaware Supreme Court (1978–1994).
- Thanat Khoman, 101, Thai politician, Foreign Minister (1959–1971).
- Laura Knaperek, 60, American politician, member of the Arizona House of Representatives (1995–2006), ovarian cancer.
- Natalya Krachkovskaya, 77, Russian actress (Ivan Vasilievich: Back to the Future), heart attack.
- Ted McCaskill, 79, Canadian ice hockey player (Los Angeles Sharks).
- William O'Brien, 71, American police officer, Chief of Police for Miami (1998–2000), resigned after Elián González custody battle raid, throat cancer.
- Tome Serafimovski, 80, Macedonian sculptor.
- Yury Sokolov, 86, Russian Olympic boxer.
- Sarah Tait, 33, Australian rower, world champion (2005), Olympic silver medallist (2012), cervical cancer.
- Jim Thistle, 61, Canadian lawyer, negotiated Atlantic Accord (1985), amyotrophic lateral sclerosis.
- Retta Ward, 62, American health official and teacher, Secretary of the New Mexico Department of Health (since 2013).
- Mike Widger, 67, American CFL football player (Montreal Alouettes, Ottawa Rough Riders), Grey Cup Champion (1970, 1974).

=== 4 ===
- Taha Jabir Alalwani, 81, Iraqi-born American Islamic theologian.
- Bankroll Fresh, 28, American rapper, shot.
- John Brooks, Baron Brooks of Tremorfa, 88, Welsh politician and boxing executive, president of the British Boxing Board of Control and Welsh Sports Hall of Fame.
- Jerry Dolyn Brown, 73, American pottery artist.
- Theodor Cazaban, 95, French writer.
- Daryl Cohen, 80, Australian Olympic weightlifter.
- Bud Collins, 86, American sports journalist.
- Pat Conroy, 70, American author (The Prince of Tides, The Great Santini, The Lords of Discipline), pancreatic cancer.
- Pirro Cuniberti, 92, Italian artist.
- Robert Franklin Durden, 90, American historian and author.
- Joey Feek, 40, American country singer (Joey + Rory), cervical cancer.
- James Ferris, 83–84, American chemist.
- Vincenzo Franco, 98, Italian Roman Catholic prelate, Bishop of Tursi-Lagonegro (1974–1981) and Archbishop of Otranto (1981–1993).
- David M. Gates, 94, American ecologist.
- Ge Cunzhuang, 87, Chinese actor, heart failure.
- Adriana Innocenti, 89, Italian actress (Eye of the Cat, Lobster for Breakfast, The Cat).
- Ekrem Jevrić, 54, Montenegrin singer, heart attack.
- Thea Knutzen, 85, Norwegian politician, MP (1985–1993).
- Yuri Kuznetsov, 83, Azerbaijani Soviet football player and coach (Neftchi).
- Peter Laufer, 79, German Olympic athlete.
- Enriquito López, 60, Dominican Republic politician, member of the Senate (2000–2004).
- Domenico Maselli, 82, Italian politician.
- Bill Michael, 81, American football coach (UTEP, 1977–1981).
- Thomas G. Morris, 96, American politician, member of the U.S. House of Representatives for New Mexico's at-large district (1959–1969) and New Mexico House (1953–1958).
- Julio Lacarte Muró, 97, Uruguayan diplomat and politician.
- Morgan F. Murphy, 83, American politician, member of the U.S. House of Representatives from Illinois's 3rd congressional district (1971–1981), prostate cancer.
- George Ndung'u Mwicigi, 83, Kenyan politician.
- P. K. Nair, 82, Indian film archivist.
- Ramón Palomares, 80, Venezuelan poet.
- William H. Plackett, 78, American naval non-commissioned officer, 6th MCPON (1985–1988).
- Jane Plant, 71, British geochemist.
- Joseph Rwegasira, 81, Tanzanian diplomat, Minister of Foreign Affairs (1993–1995), Ambassador to Zambia.
- P. A. Sangma, 68, Indian politician, Speaker of the Lok Sabha (1996–1998), Chief Minister of Meghalaya (1988–1990), heart attack.
- Marilyn Stokstad, 87, American art historian.
- Harry Turbott, 85, New Zealand architect and landscape architect.
- Abbas Vaez-Tabasi, 80, Iranian cleric, Grand Imam of Ali al-Ridha mosque (since 1979), cancer.
- Vladimir Yumin, 64, Russian Soviet wrestler, Olympic champion (1976), heart attack.
- Zhou Xiaoyan, 98, Chinese vocal pedagogue and classical soprano.

=== 5 ===
- David Abbott, 81, British-born New Zealand cricket umpire, cancer.
- Hassan Al-Turabi, 84, Sudanese Islamic spiritual leader, member of the National Assembly.
- Giorgio Ariani, 74, Italian comedian and actor (Pinocchio).
- Antoni Asunción, 64, Spanish politician, Minister of Interior (1993–1994).
- Caesar Belser, 71, American football player (Kansas City Chiefs), Super Bowl winner (1970), lung cancer.
- Julio César Chalar, Uruguayan lawyer and judge.
- Paul Couch, 51, Australian footballer (Geelong), heart attack.
- James Douglas, 86, American actor (As the World Turns, Peyton Place, G.I. Blues).
- Helle-Vibeke Erichsen, 76, Danish artist.
- Sture Eskilsson, 85, Swedish economist.
- John Evans, Baron Evans of Parkside, 85, British politician, MP for Newton (1974–1983) and St Helens North (1983–1997).
- Even Hansen, 92, Norwegian footballer (Odd, national team).
- Nikolaus Harnoncourt, 86, Austrian conductor and cellist (Vienna Symphony), founder of Concentus Musicus Wien.
- Alan Henry, 68, British motorsport journalist.
- Henry Hobhouse, 91, British author (Seeds of Change: Five Plants That Transformed Mankind).
- Chip Hooper, 53, American musical agent (Dave Matthews, Phish), cancer.
- Jim MacNeill, 87, Canadian environmentalist and senior Cabinet adviser, pneumonia.
- Lester Menke, 97, American politician, member of the Iowa House of Representatives (1973–1985).
- Harriet Cornelia Mills, 95, American academic and sinologist.
- John Douglas, 21st Earl of Morton, 88, British aristocrat.
- Ottavio Panunzi, 83, Italian Olympic boxer.
- Robert Redbird, 76, American Kiowa artist, Alzheimer's disease.
- Rafael Squirru, 90, Argentine author.
- Panayiotis Tetsis, 91, Greek painter.
- Jaroslav Tomáš, 67, Czech Olympic volleyball player.
- Ray Tomlinson, 74, American computer programmer, invented system to send first email and assigned use of @ sign, heart attack.
- Stephen H. Webb, 54, American theologian, suicide.
- Al Wistert, 95, American football player (Philadelphia Eagles, Michigan Wolverines), NFL Champion (1948, 1949).

=== 6 ===
- Barbara Almond, 77, American psychiatrist, bladder cancer.
- Wally Bragg, 86, English footballer (Brentford).
- Jerry Bridges, 86, American evangelical Christian author, speaker and administrator (The Navigators).
- Joan Brown, 90, British potter.
- Elizabeth Garrett, 52, American educator, president of Cornell University (since 2015), colon cancer.
- Znaur Gassiev, 90, South Ossetian politician.
- Paolo Giglio, 89, Maltese Roman Catholic prelate and diplomat, Apostolic nuncio (1986–2002).
- D. G. Jones, 87, Canadian poet.
- Arto Koivisto, 85, Finnish basketball player.
- Walter Kozak, 84–85, Canadian Olympic boxer.
- Joseph Kumuondala Mbimba, 75, Congolese Roman Catholic prelate, Bishop of Bokungu–Ikela (1982–1991) and Archbishop of Mbandaka-Bikoro (since 1991).
- Kalabhavan Mani, 45, Indian actor and singer, liver cirrhosis and methyl alcohol poisoning.
- Demetri Marchessini, 81, Greek businessman.
- Ernest George Mardon, 87, British-born Canadian historian.
- Shirley Netherway, 78, British Olympic fencer (1960, 1964).
- James Ocholi, 55, Nigerian politician, traffic collision.
- Francis Pasion, 38, Filipino director (On the Wings of Love), heart attack.
- Aldo Ralli, 80, Italian actor (Il Divo, Crime in Formula One).
- Nancy Reagan, 94, American First Lady (1981–1989) and actress (Hellcats of the Navy, Donovan's Brain, The Next Voice You Hear...), heart failure.
- Gaspar Rosety, 57, Spanish journalist, complications from a stroke.
- María Rostworowski, 100, Peruvian historian.
- Harold H. Saunders, 85, American diplomat, prostate cancer.
- Elwyn L. Simons, 87, American paleontologist.
- Gary Smalley, 75, American family counselor, Christian and relationship author, complications from heart and kidney disease.
- Elizabeth Strohfus, 96, American military pilot (WASP), recipient of two Congressional Gold Medals, complications from a fall.
- Akira Tago, 90, Japanese psychologist.
- Sheila Varian, 78, American horse breeder (Arabian horses), ovarian cancer.

=== 7 ===
- Raymond Conway Benjamin, 91, Australian Roman Catholic prelate, Bishop of Townsville (1984–2000).
- Leonard Berney, 95, British military officer, a liberator of Bergen-Belsen, heart attack.
- Andy Borsa, 71, American politician.
- Gary Braasch, 70, American environmental photographer.
- Carlos Bru, 87, Mexican Olympic basketball player.
- Joe Cabot, 94, American jazz musician and band leader.
- Bill Cooper, 87, British sailor.
- Scott Goodall, 80, British comic book writer (Fishboy).
- Adrian Hardiman, 64, Irish judge, member of the Supreme Court (since 2000).
- Jim Hogan, 79, Irish hurler.
- Bobby Johns, 83, American race car driver (NASCAR, Indianapolis 500).
- Börje Karvonen, 77, Finnish Olympic boxer.
- Steve Kraly, 86, American baseball player (New York Yankees), World Series Champion (1953).
- Béla Kuharszki, 75, Hungarian footballer (Újpesti Dózsa).
- Min Enze, 92, Chinese chemist and academician (Chinese Academy of Sciences and Engineering).
- Khalid Mahmood Mithu, 55, Bangladeshi film director (Gohine Shobdo), falling tree.
- Jean-Bernard Raimond, 90, French politician, Minister of Foreign Affairs (1986–1988), ambassador to Morocco, Poland, the Soviet Union and the Vatican.
- Des O'Reilly, 61, Australian rugby league player (Sydney Roosters).
- Paul Ryan, 66, American comic artist (Fantastic Four, Superman, The Phantom).
- Michael White, 80, Scottish film and theatre producer (Monty Python and the Holy Grail, The Rocky Horror Picture Show), Tony winner (1971), heart failure.
- Quentin Young, 93, American physician.

=== 8 ===
- Mohamed Allek, 42, Algerian athlete, Paralympic champion (1996, 2000).
- Luigi Corioni, 78, Italian bathroom furnishings and football executive (Brescia Calcio, A.C. Milan, Bologna).
- Richard Davalos, 85, American actor (Cool Hand Luke, East of Eden, Kelly's Heroes).
- Luciano Di Palma, 71, Italian Olympic judoka.
- Dieter Fänger, 90, German Olympic fencer (1960).
- Aldo Ferrer, 88, Argentine economist.
- Ross Hannaford, 65, Australian musician (Daddy Cool), cancer.
- Jerome Heckenkamp, 36, Australian-born American computer hacker.
- Ron Jacobs, 78, American broadcaster, co-creator of American Top 40.
- David S. Johnson, 70, American computer scientist.
- John Jones, 90, British Olympic water polo player (1952, 1956).
- Esko Karhunen, 88, Finnish Olympic basketball player (1952) and contributor.
- Andrew Loomis, 54, American drummer (Dead Moon), lymphoma.
- Sir George Martin, 90, British Hall of Fame record producer (The Beatles), composer, arranger and engineer, six-time Grammy Award winner.
- Gertrudes Morg, 90, Brazilian Olympic sprinter.
- Claus Ogerman, 86, German jazz conductor and arranger.
- M. V. Rao, 88, Indian agricultural scientist.
- Alfred E. Senn, 83, American historian and academic, awarded Order of Vytautas the Great for service to Lithuania.
- Reino Suojanen, 90, Finnish footballer

=== 9 ===
- Bruno Agostinelli, 28, Canadian tennis player (Davis Cup), traffic collision.
- Kathryn Reed Altman, 91, American actress and archivist, heart attack.
- Sergio Arellano Stark, 94, Chilean military officer, leader of the Caravan of Death, Alzheimer's disease.
- Galagama Sri Aththadassi Thera, 94, Sri Lankan Buddhist monk, Mahanayaka of the Asgiriya Chapter of Siyam Nikaya (since 2015).
- Lawrence E. Bennett, 92, American politician, member of the New York State Assembly (1983–1994).
- Poul Erik Bæk, 75, Danish Olympic equestrian.
- Karen Carroll, 58, American blues singer.
- Jon English, 66, English-born Australian musician and actor (Against the Wind), complications from surgery.
- Léon Francioli, 69, Swiss double bass player.
- Ray Griff, 75, Canadian country music singer ("If I Let Her Come In") and songwriter ("Canadian Pacific"), complications of pneumonia from surgery.
- John Gutfreund, 86, American investor (Salomon Brothers), complications from pneumonia.
- Robert Horton, 91, American actor (Wagon Train).
- William Russell Houck, 89, American Roman Catholic prelate, Bishop of Jackson (1984–2003), complications from heart surgery.
- Giancarlo Ibarguen, 53, Guatemalan businessman and academic, president of Universidad Francisco Marroquín (2003–2013), amyotrophic lateral sclerosis.
- Gary Jeter, 61, American football player (Los Angeles Rams, New York Giants), heart attack.
- Ralph S. Larsen, 77, American consumer products executive, CEO and Chairman of Johnson & Johnson, cardiac arrest.
- Clyde Lovellette, 86, American basketball player (Minneapolis Lakers, St. Louis Hawks, Boston Celtics), NBA champion (1954, 1963, 1964), Olympic champion (1952), cancer.
- James McNamara, 76, Irish long-distance runner, M50 10000 metre world record holder (1989–1991).
- Keigo Ōuchi, 86, Japanese politician, pneumonia.
- John Pennebaker, 72, American politician, member of the Mississippi House of Representatives (1975–1992).
- Reinhold Remmert, 85, German mathematician.
- Ivan Rohrt, 95, Australian sports administrator, President of Carlton Football Club (1974–1977).
- Tina St. Claire, 31, American artist, cancer.
- Ted Szilva, 81, Canadian monument creator (Big Nickel).
- Naná Vasconcelos, 71, Brazilian jazz percussionist and vocalist, eight-time Grammy Award winner, lung cancer.
- Bill Wade, 85, American football player (Los Angeles Rams, Chicago Bears), NFL Champion (1963).
- Coy Wayne Wesbrook, 58, American convicted mass murderer, execution by lethal injection.

=== 10 ===
- Sir Ken Adam, 95, German-born British production designer (Dr. Strangelove, James Bond, The Madness of King George), Oscar winner (1975, 1994).
- Ernestine Anderson, 87, American jazz vocalist.
- Joan Bates, 86, British Sealandic princess.
- Anita Brookner, 87, British novelist (Hotel du Lac) and art historian, Man Booker Prize winner (1984).
- Daniel Buess, 40, Swiss drummer.
- Frank E. Coggin, 88, American politician.
- Fangge Dupan, 89, Taiwanese poet.
- William Dyke, 85, American politician, mayor of Madison, Wisconsin (1969–1973), complications from pancreatic cancer.
- Claude Estier, 90, French politician and journalist, member of the National Assembly for Paris (1967–1968, 1981–1986), MEP for France (1979–1981).
- Bill Gadsby, 88, Canadian Hall of Fame ice hockey player (Detroit Red Wings, Chicago Blackhawks, New York Rangers).
- Andrew Gotianun, 88, Filipino real estate and financial sector executive, founder of Filinvest.
- Gogi Grant, 91, American pop singer ("The Wayward Wind").
- Andreas Henrisusanta, 80, Indonesian Roman Catholic prelate, Bishop of Tanjungkarang (1976–2012).
- Mohammad Irfan, 64, Indian politician, Uttar Pradesh MLA for Bilari (since 2012), traffic collision.
- Hans Kleefeld, 86, Canadian graphic designer (Air Canada, TD Bank).
- Kostas Koutsomytis, 77, Greek film director and screenwriter.
- Dave Liddick, 80, American football player (Pittsburgh Steelers, Cleveland Browns).
- Roberts Bishop Owen, 90, American lawyer and diplomat.
- Roberto Perfumo, 73, Argentine footballer (Racing Club, Cruzeiro, national team), fall.
- Judy Pickard, 94, New Zealand abstract painter, librarian and advocate for women's rights.
- Jovito Salonga, 95, Filipino politician, Senate President (1987–1992), cardiac arrest.
- Nobuyuki Siraisi, 81, Japanese-born American artist.
- Marie Tansey, 86, American politician.
- Julio Vial, 82, Chilean footballer.

=== 11 ===
- Tita Kovač Artemis, 85, Slovene-born Greek chemist and writer.
- Joe Ascione, 54, American jazz drummer.
- Ben Bagdikian, 96, Armenian-American educator and journalist.
- Iolanda Balaș, 79, Romanian high jumper, Olympic champion (1960, 1964), director of the FRA (1988–2005), complications from a gastric disorder.
- Sel Belsham, 85, New Zealand rugby league player (Auckland, national team) and cricketer (Auckland).
- François-Eudes Chanfrault, 41, French composer (The Hills Have Eyes, High Tension).
- Antonio Cabangon-Chua, 81, Filipino real estate, financial executive and diplomat, Ambassador to Laos, founder of Citystate Savings Bank.
- Deva Dassy, 104, French opera singer.
- Geoffrey Eglinton, 88, British chemist.
- Shawn Elliott, 79, American singer and actor (The Dead Pool, Broken City, Law & Order).
- Keith Emerson, 71, English progressive rock keyboardist (The Nice; Emerson, Lake & Palmer), suicide by gunshot.
- Rómulo Macció, 84, Argentine painter.
- Doreen Massey, 72, British geographer.
- Nicole Maurey, 90, French actress.
- Louis Meyers, 60, American festival organizer, co-founder of South by Southwest, director of Folk Alliance International, suspected heart attack.
- Brenda Naylor, 89, British sculptor.
- Dragan Nikolić, 72, Serbian actor.
- Vasco Nunes, 41, Portuguese cinematographer and cameraman (Planet B-Boy, Anvil! The Story of Anvil, Rampart).
- Gerard Reedy, 76, American Jesuit priest and academic, president of the College of the Holy Cross (1994–1998).
- Billy Ritchie, 79, Scottish footballer (Rangers, Partick Thistle).
- Ruth Terry, 95, American singer and actress (Pistol Packin' Mama).
- Lawrence Van Gelder, 83, American newspaper journalist (The New York Times), leiomyosarcoma.

=== 12 ===
- Mo Abbaro, 82, Sudanese-born British potter.
- Christopher Armishaw, 63, English cricketer (Derbyshire).
- Rafiq Azad, 74, Bangladeshi poet, stroke.
- Annastasia Batikis, 88, American baseball player (Racine Belles).
- Tommy Brown, 84, American R&B singer.
- John Caldwell, 87, Australian demographer.
- Donnie Duncan, 75, American football coach (Iowa State), cancer.
- Erik Duval, 50, Belgian computer scientist, T-cell lymfoblastic lymphoma.
- Richard Fowler, 67–68, American naturalist and wilderness guide.
- Charlie Fulton, 67, American professional wrestler (WWF).
- Eliot Gant, 89, American executive (Gant).
- Verena Huber-Dyson, 92, American mathematician.
- Morton Hunt, 96, American psychologist and science writer.
- Felix Ibru, 80, Nigerian politician, Governor of Delta State (1992–1993).
- June Jolly, 87, English paediatric nurse and social worker.
- Harry Kartz, 102, British businessman, Aston Villa chairman (1978–1980).
- Mohammed Khalfan Bin Kharbash, 60, Emirati politician, Minister of State for Finance and Industry Affairs (1997–2007).
- Pierce Lively, 94, American federal judge, U.S. Court of Appeals for the Sixth Circuit (1972–1989).
- Carlos Ozores, 76, Panamanian politician, Vice President (1984; 1989).
- Rudolf Sarközi, 71, Austrian Romani activist.
- Lloyd Shapley, 92, American mathematician and economist, laureate of the Nobel Memorial Prize in Economic Sciences (2012).
- Helmut Veith, 45, Austrian computer scientist.
- Bill Whitby, 72, American baseball player (Minnesota Twins).

=== 13 ===
- Trent Baker, 25, Australian baseball player (Brisbane Bandits).
- Kaba Rougui Barry, 62, Guinean businesswomen and politician, Minister Delegate for Guineans Abroad (2010–2014), Minister of Pre-University, Technical, Vocational Education and Civic Education (2009–2010), and Mayor of Matam (1991–2000).
- Ken Broderick, 74, Canadian ice hockey player (Edmonton Oilers, Boston Bruins), Olympic bronze medallist (1968).
- Adrienne Corri, 85, British actress (Doctor Zhivago, A Clockwork Orange, Doctor Who), heart failure.
- Masanobu Deme, 83, Japanese film director (Station to Heaven, Baruto no Gakuen).
- Darryl Hunt, 50, American justice reform activist, apparent suicide by gunshot.
- Lord Michael Jones, 68, Scottish judge.
- Sidney Mear, 97, American trumpeter.
- Bo Nat Khann Mway, 55, Burmese Karen military officer, commander-in-chief of DKBA, neck cancer.
- Keith Ollerenshaw, 87, Australian Olympic long-distance runner (1956).
- Beatriz Canedo Patiño, 66, Bolivian fashion designer.
- Henry Porter, 94, Canadian vice-admiral, Commander Maritime Command (1970–1971).
- Sai Prashanth, 30, Indian actor, suspected suicide by poison.
- Hilary Putnam, 89, American philosopher, mathematician and computer scientist.
- Jon Roehlk, 54, American arena football player.
- Martin Olav Sabo, 78, American politician, member of the U.S. House of Representatives for Minnesota's 5th district (1979–2007).
- József Verebes, 74, Hungarian football player and coach.

=== 14 ===
- Mónica Arriola Gordillo, 44, Mexican politician, member of the Chamber of Deputies (2006–2009), brain tumor.
- Charles W. Berger, 80, American politician.
- Nicolau Breyner, 75, Portuguese playwright, director and actor.
- Robert Burns, 89, American politician.
- John W. Cahn, 88, German-born American metallurgist, awarded National Medal of Science (1998), namesake of Cahn–Hilliard equation, leukemia.
- Patrick Cain, 53, American football player (Detroit Lions), lung cancer.
- Sir Peter Maxwell Davies, 81, English composer and conductor, Master of the Queen's Music (2004–2014), leukaemia.
- Lilly Dubowitz, 85, Hungarian-born British paediatrician.
- Virgilio Elizondo, 80, American Roman Catholic priest and theologian, suicide by gunshot.
- Surangani Ellawala, 76, Sri Lankan politician, Governor of the Central Province (2015–2016).
- Mustapha Fadli, 54–55, Moroccan Olympic boxer.
- Riccardo Garrone, 89, Italian actor (La Dolce Vita, The Yellow Rolls-Royce, Swordsman of Siena).
- Tamara Grigsby, 41, American politician, member of the Wisconsin State Assembly (2004–2012).
- Geoffrey Hartman, 86, German-born American literary critic.
- Vasil Konstantinov, 86, Bulgarian Olympic gymnast.
- Lloyd R. Leavitt Jr., 87, American air force lieutenant general.
- Peter Lerche, 88, German jurist.
- Ahmed Baba Miské, 80, Mauritanian politician and diplomat, Ambassador to the United States (1964–1966), Permanent Representative to the United Nations (1964–1966).
- Leilani Muir, 71, Canadian human rights activist.
- Hans-Martin Pawlowski, 84, German lawyer and academic.
- June Peppas, 86, American AAGPBL baseball player (Kalamazoo Lassies).
- Suranimala Rajapaksha, 67, Sri Lankan politician and minister, MP (1994–2004).
- Vic Schwenk, 91, American football player and coach.
- Davy Walsh, 92, Irish footballer.
- Arkangelo Bari Wanji, 80, South Sudanese politician and academic, member of the National Assembly (since 2010).

=== 15 ===
- Jacqueline Alduy, 91, French politician.
- Sylvia Anderson, 88, British television producer and voice actress (Thunderbirds).
- André Bénard, 93, French oil and transit executive, co-chairman of the Eurotunnel.
- Better Loosen Up, 30, Australian Thoroughbred racehorse, winner of the Japan Cup and Racehorse of the Year (1990), euthanised.
- Asa Briggs, Baron Briggs, 94, British historian, codebreaker and life peer.
- Richard Burke, 83, Irish politician, member of the Dáil Éireann for Dublin County South and Dublin West, European Commissioner (1977–1980, 1982–1984).
- Robert Carrickford, 88, Irish actor (The Irish R.M., Glenroe).
- Daryl Coley, 60, American gospel singer.
- Jean Defraigne, 86, Dutch-born Belgian politician, member of the Chamber of Representatives (1965–1974, 1977–1989) and Senate (1974–1977).
- Ryo Fukui, 67, Japanese jazz pianist.
- Ralph C. Johnson, 62, American politician, member of the North Carolina House of Representatives (since 2015), complications from a stroke.
- Paul Lange, 85, German sprint canoeist, Olympic champion (1960).
- Prince Mfanasibili of Swaziland, 77, Swazi royal.
- Lincoln Myers, 66, Trinidadian politician, Environment and National Service minister and MP for St Ann's East.
- John Ene Okon, 47, Nigerian football player and coach (national team).
- Earline W. Parmon, 72, American politician, member of the North Carolina House of Representatives (2002–2012) and Senate (2012–2015).
- Alice Pollitt, 86, American AAGPBL baseball player (Rockford Peaches).
- Jan Pronk, 97, Dutch cyclist, world champion in motor-paced racing (1951).
- Seru Rabeni, 37, Fijian rugby union player (national team, Leicester Tigers), suspected heart attack.
- Sebastian Rahtz, 61, British digital humanities researcher, brain cancer.
- Lyubka Rondova, 79, Bulgarian folk singer.
- Thanh Tùng, 67, Vietnamese songwriter.
- Vladimir Yurin, 68, Russian football coach and player (FC Torpedo Moscow).

=== 16 ===
- Wilson Ndolo Ayah, 84, Kenyan diplomat and politician, Foreign Minister (1990–1993), MP for Kisumu (1992–1997).
- William B. Bader, 84, American civil servant, Assistant Secretary of State for Educational and Cultural Affairs (1999–2001).
- Bill W. Balthis, 76, American politician.
- Vladimiras Beriozovas, 86, Lithuanian politician, member of the Supreme Soviet of the Lithuanian SSR (1985–1990), Seimas for Kėdainiai (1990–1992).
- R. Earl Dixon, 89, American politician.
- Oleg Eremeev, 93, Soviet Russian painter.
- Alexander Esenin-Volpin, 91, Soviet-born American poet and mathematician.
- Ali Ahmed Hussain Khan, 76, Indian shehnai musician, kidney disease.
- Garry Lefebvre, 71, Canadian CFL football player (Edmonton Eskimos).
- George McLean, 92, Canadian journalist and news anchor (The National).
- George Menzies, 85, New Zealand rugby league player and coach (West Coast, national team).
- Edward Shearman Ross, 100, American entomologist.
- Norma Rubovits, 97, American paper marbler, stroke.
- Gene Short, 62, American basketball player (Seattle SuperSonics, New York Knicks), bronze medalist at the 1974 FIBA World Championship.
- Frank Sinatra Jr., 72, American singer (That Face!) and actor (Hollywood Homicide), heart attack.
- Brian Smyth, 91, Irish Gaelic footballer and hurler (Meath).
- Alan Spavin, 74, English footballer (Preston North End, Dundalk).
- Georges Tarabichi, 77, Syrian writer and translator.

=== 17 ===
- Ralph David Abernathy III, 56, American politician, member of the Georgia House of Representatives (1988–1992) and State Senate (1992–1998), liver cancer.
- Bandar bin Saud Al Saud, 90, Saudi royal.
- Shozo Awazu, 92, Japanese judoka.
- André Boerstra, 91, Dutch field hockey player, Olympic silver medalist (1952), bronze medalist (1948).
- E. L. Boteler, 96, American politician, member of the Mississippi House of Representatives (1956–1972).
- Claudine K. Brown, 67, American museum director (Smithsonian Institution).
- Ward Cates, 73, American epidemiologist.
- Burdett Coutts, 96, Singaporean Olympic hockey player.
- Meir Dagan, 71, Israeli military officer and intelligence official, Director of Mossad (2002–2011), cancer.
- Paul Daniels, 77, British magician (The Paul Daniels Magic Show), brain tumour.
- Larry Drake, 66, American actor (L.A. Law, Johnny Bravo, Darkman), Emmy winner (1988, 1989), blood cancer.
- Gaúcho, 52, Brazilian football coach and player (Flamengo), prostate cancer.
- Léonie Geisendorf, 101, Polish-born Swedish architect.
- Charles Kaufman, 87, American educator (Mannes College of Music), acute myeloid leukemia.
- Trần Lập, 41, Vietnamese rock singer, colorectal cancer.
- Zoltán Kamondi, 55, Hungarian film director (Paths of Death and Angels).
- Marian Kociniak, 80, Polish actor (How I Unleashed World War II).
- Subrata Maitra, 59, Indian cardiologist, brain cancer.
- Solomon Marcus, 91, Romanian mathematician.
- Sandy McDonald, 78, Scottish Christian minister, Moderator of the General Assembly of the Church of Scotland (1997–1998), pulmonary fibrosis.
- David McSkimming, 66, Australian pianist, opera repetiteur and vocal coach, motor neurone disease.
- Cliff Michelmore, 96, British television presenter and producer.
- Frederick Moore, 85, English cricketer (Lancashire).
- Trevor J. Phillips, 89, British-born American philosopher.
- Alexander Prokhorenko, 25, Russian soldier, airstrike.
- Jean Prodromidès, 88, French composer.
- Eliezer Ronen, 84, Mexican-born Israeli politician, member of the Knesset (1974–1977).
- Ilkka Ruohonen, 57, Finnish cultural anthropologist and documentary film maker.
- Jun Shiraoka, 71, Japanese photographer.
- Pat Sobeski, 64, Canadian politician, MP for Cambridge (1988–1993).
- Angela Stevens, 90, American actress (He Cooked His Goose, Creature with the Atom Brain).
- Steve Young, 73, American outlaw country music singer–songwriter ("Seven Bridges Road").

=== 18 ===
- Miguel Hernández Agosto, 88, Puerto Rican politician, President of the Senate (1981–1992).
- José Carlos Avellar, 79, Brazilian film critic (Jornal do Brasil).
- Melody Millicent Danquah, 79, Ghanaian air force pilot.
- Charlie Davis, 89, American baseball player (Memphis Red Sox).
- David Egan, 61, American musician, lung cancer.
- Adnan Abu Hassan, 57, Malaysian composer, stroke, diabetes and kidney failure.
- Barry Hines, 76, English author (A Kestrel for a Knave), Alzheimer's disease.
- Șerban Iliescu, 60, Romanian linguist and journalist.
- Kong Jaw-sheng, 60, Taiwanese bank executive, chairman of the FSC (2004–2006), heart attack.
- Cherylene Lee, 60, American actress (Donovan's Reef), breast cancer.
- Ned Miller, 90, American country singer-songwriter.
- Jan Němec, 79, Czech film director (A Report on the Party and the Guests) and screenwriter.
- Murray Newman, 92, American-born Canadian curator and zoologist, founding director of the Vancouver Aquarium (1955–1993), stroke.
- Fred Richards, 88, American baseball player (Chicago Cubs).
- Allan Rocher, 80, Australian politician, Senator (1977–1981) and MP (1981–1998), Consul-General in Los Angeles.
- Joe Santos, 84, American actor (The Rockford Files, The Sopranos, The Last Boy Scout), heart attack.
- Lothar Späth, 78, German politician, Minister President of Baden-Württemberg (1978–1991), Alzheimer's disease.
- Paul Swadel, 47, New Zealand film director and producer.
- Les Tanyuk, 77, Ukrainian theatre and film director and politician, MP (1990–2007).
- Thomas J. Turner, 83, American politician.
- John Urry, 69, British sociologist.
- Tray Walker, 23, American football player (Baltimore Ravens), dirt bike collision.
- Guido Westerwelle, 54, German politician, Minister for Foreign Affairs (2009–2013) and Vice-Chancellor (2009–2011), leukemia.
- Harold Zisla, 90, American painter.

=== 19 ===
- Bob Adelman, 85, American photographer of the Civil Rights Movement.
- Roger Agnelli, 56, Brazilian bank and mining executive, CEO of Vale S.A. (2001–2011), plane crash.
- Rashiduddin Ahmad, 78, Bangladeshi neurosurgeon.
- José Artetxe, 85, Spanish footballer (Athletic Bilbao).
- Zygmunt Bogdziewicz, 74, Polish Olympic sports shooter (1972, 1976).
- John Cannon, 35, Canadian rugby union player (national team), suspected heart attack.
- Pavel Chernev, 46, Bulgarian politician, member of the National Assembly (2005–2009), pulmonary embolism.
- Martha Ehlin, 38, Swedish organisation founder, cancer.
- Adam Faul, 86, Canadian Olympic boxer (1948).
- Graham Fortune, 74, New Zealand diplomat and public servant, permanent representative to the UN in Geneva (1987–1990), High Commissioner to Australia (1994–1999).
- David Green, 76, Welsh cricketer (Lancashire, Gloucestershire).
- Kuzie Kuzmanich, 89, American racing driver.
- José Ramón Herrero Merediz, 85, Spanish politician, member of the Senate (1982–1996) and European Parliament (1986–1987).
- Jack Mansell, 88, British football player and coach.
- Jerry Taylor, 78, American politician, member of the Arkansas House of Representatives (2001–2005) and Senate (2005–2012), Mayor of Pine Bluff (1992–2000), PSP.
- Wong Lam, 96, Hong Kong politician, unofficial member of the Legislative Council of Hong Kong (1976–1985).
- Zeinab Elobeid Yousif, 63–64, Sudanese aircraft engineer.

=== 20 ===
- Jack Boxley, 84, English footballer (Bristol City, Coventry City).
- Sándor Csjef, 65, Hungarian boxer, European champion (1973), hit by train.
- Parveen Sultana Diti, 50, Bangladeshi actress, cancer.
- Don Filleul, 90, Jersey politician, member of the States for Saint Helier No 1 (1978–1987), chairman of Jersey Heritage.
- Robert J. Healey, 58, American politician, political activist and attorney, suspected heart attack.
- Gayle Hopkins, 74, American Olympic long jumper (1964).
- Anker Jørgensen, 93, Danish politician, Prime Minister (1972–1973, 1975–1982).
- Jake Obetsebi-Lamptey, 70, Ghanaian politician, member of the Kufuor government (2001–2007), leukemia.
- Odo Fusi Pecci, 95, Italian Roman Catholic prelate, Bishop of Senigallia (1971–1997).
- Paddy Philpott, 79, Irish hurler (Cork).
- Cedric Ritchie, 88, Canadian banker, CEO of Scotiabank.
- Stanley South, 88, American archaeologist.
- Sveinung Valle, 57, Norwegian politician.
- Orren R. Whiddon, 81, American lieutenant general.

=== 21 ===
- Robert McNeill Alexander, 81, British zoologist.
- Film News Anandan, 88, Indian film historian.
- Leroy Blunt, 94, American politician, member of the Missouri House of Representatives (1979–1986), complications from stroke.
- Peter Brown, 80, American actor (Days of Our Lives, Lawman, Foxy Brown), complications from Parkinson's disease.
- Ian Bruce, 82, Canadian Olympic sailor.
- Leon Charney, 77, American real estate tycoon and talk show host.
- Alphonse Liguori Chaupa, 56, Papua New Guinean Catholic prelate, Bishop of Kimbe (2003–2008).
- Jean Cornelis, 74, Belgian footballer (R.S.C. Anderlecht), complications following a heart attack.
- Tomás de Mattos, 68, Uruguayan author, stroke.
- Andrew Grove, 79, Hungarian-born American electronic executive, CEO and chairman of Intel Corporation, Parkinson's disease.
- Georges Grünenfelder, 79, Swiss Olympic alpine skier.
- Ricardo Larraín, 58, Chilean film director (The Frontier), lymphoma.
- Joseph Mercieca, 87, Maltese Roman Catholic prelate, Archbishop of Malta (1976–2006).
- Don Nakanishi, 66, American academic.
- Paolo Maria Napolitano, 71, Italian judge, member of the Constitutional Court (2006–2015).
- Larry Ross, 78, American colonel and politician.
- Carolyn Squires, 75, American politician, member of the Montana Senate (2002–2010) and House of Representatives (2010–2014).

=== 22 ===
- André Adam, 79, Belgian-French diplomat, Ambassador to Algeria (1986–1990), Zaire (1990–1991) and United States (1994–1998), injuries sustained in Brussels Airport bombings.
- Ibrahim El Bakraoui, 29, Belgian terrorist (2016 Brussels bombings).
- Khalid El Bakraoui, 27, Belgian terrorist (2016 Brussels bombings).
- Enrico Bisso, 60, Italian Olympic swimmer.
- Richard Bradford, 81, American actor (Man in a Suitcase, The Untouchables, Cagney & Lacey).
- André Brincourt, 95, French author.
- Petra Davies, 85, British actress.
- Glen Dawson, 103, American rock climber and mountaineer.
- Javier de Nicoló, 87, Italian-born Colombian priest.
- Santiago J. Erevia, 69, American soldier, Medal of Honor recipient.
- Rob Ford, 46, Canadian politician, Mayor of Toronto (2010–2014), liposarcoma.
- Rita Gam, 88, American actress (The Thief, Klute, No Exit) and filmmaker, respiratory failure.
- Cecil Hechanova, 84, Filipino sports administrator (Philippine Sports Commission).
- Aarne Honkavaara, 91, Finnish Olympic ice hockey player (1952) and coach (national team).
- Magsud Ibrahimbeyov, 80, Azerbaijani writer and politician, member of the National Assembly.
- Norm Johnson, 83, Canadian ice hockey player (Boston Bruins, Chicago Blackhawks).
- Najim Laachraoui, 24, Moroccan-born Belgian terrorist (2016 Brussels bombings).
- Justin Leiber, 77, American philosopher and science fiction writer.
- Harold J. Morowitz, 88, American biophysicist.
- Konstantin Ozgan, 76, Georgian Abkhaz politician.
- Phife Dawg, 45, American rap musician (A Tribe Called Quest), complications from diabetes.
- Richard Popplewell, 80, English organist.
- James M. Robinson, 91, American biblical scholar.
- David Smyrl, 80, American actor (Sesame Street, The Preacher's Wife, The Cosby Show), lung cancer.
- Song Wencong, 85, Chinese aircraft designer (Chengdu J-10) and academic (Chinese Academy of Engineering).
- Joseph Toppo, 72, Indian politician, MP for Tezpur (2009–2014), Assam MLA for Sonitpur (1996–2009), complications from a stroke.
- Adam Kelly Ward, 33, American criminal, execution by lethal injection.

=== 23 ===
- Richard Albertine, 71, American photographer.
- David Blackburn, 76, British artist.
- Rashko Fratev, 91, Bulgarian Olympic equestrian.
- Gloria Galeano Garcés, 57, Colombian plant systematist.
- Joe Garagiola, 90, American baseball player (St. Louis Cardinals, Chicago Cubs, Pittsburgh Pirates) and sportscaster, World Series champion (1946).
- Sir Richard George, 71, British food manufacturer (Weetabix Limited).
- Gegham Grigoryan, 65, Armenian opera singer.
- Inge Hardison, 102, American sculptor, artist and photographer.
- Jim Hillyer, 41, Canadian politician, MP for Medicine Hat—Cardston—Warner (since 2011), apparent heart attack.
- Ken Howard, 71, American actor (1776, The White Shadow, J. Edgar), President of SAG/SAG-AFTRA (2009–2016), Emmy winner (1981, 2009).
- James Jamerson Jr., 58, American bass player (Chanson).
- Lauri Lehtinen, 88, Finnish footballer.
- John McKibbin, 69, American politician, member of the Washington House of Representatives (1974–1978), plane crash.
- Aharon Megged, 95, Polish-born Israeli author.
- Sir Peter Moores, 83, British businessman, Littlewoods chairman (1977–1980).
- Rangy Nanan, 62, Trinidadian cricketer (West Indies, national team), heart attack.
- J. Russell Nelson, 86, American educator, President of Arizona State University (1981–1989), complications from Alzheimer's disease.
- Emanuele Nicosia, 63, Italian automobile designer.
- Jimmy Riley, 68, Jamaican reggae musician, cancer.
- Jim Roselle, 89, American radio broadcaster (WJTN).
- Arie Smit, 99, Dutch-born Indonesian painter.
- Fernando Solana, 85, Mexican diplomat and politician, member of the Senate for Mexico City (1994–2000), Secretary of Foreign Affairs (1988–1993), negotiated NAFTA.
- Tom Whedon, 83, American television writer (The Golden Girls, The Electric Company, Alice).

=== 24 ===
- Julius Adams, 67, American football player (New England Patriots).
- Maggie Blye, 73, American actress (The Italian Job), cancer.
- Roger Cicero, 45, German jazz and pop musician, stroke.
- Johan Cruyff, 68, Dutch football player and manager (AFC Ajax, FC Barcelona, Feyenoord, national team), lung cancer.
- Ed Dubois, 63, British yacht designer.
- Earl Hamner Jr., 92, American television writer and producer (Falcon Crest, The Waltons, The Twilight Zone), cancer.
- Esther Herlitz, 94, Israeli diplomat and politician, Ambassador to Denmark (1966–1971), country's first female ambassador.
- Marie-Claire Kirkland, 91, Canadian politician and judge, first woman elected to the Legislative Assembly of Quebec.
- Tibor Machan, 77, Hungarian-American philosopher.
- Mae-Wan Ho, 74, Hong Kong geneticist.
- Timothée Modibo-Nzockena, 66, Congolese-born Gabonese Roman Catholic prelate, Bishop of Franceville (since 1996).
- Edgar G. "Sonny" Mouton Jr., 86, American politician.
- Leonard L. Northrup Jr., 98, American engineer.
- Serge Panizza, 73, French Olympic fencer.
- Dick Rahoi, 81, American Olympic ski jumper.
- V. D. Rajappan, 70, Indian actor.
- Proloy Saha, 47, Indian footballer (East Bengal, national team), traffic collision.
- Nicholas Scoppetta, 84, American civil servant, New York City Fire Commissioner (2002–2009).
- Garry Shandling, 66, American comedian and actor (The Larry Sanders Show, It's Garry Shandling's Show, Over the Hedge), Emmy winner (1998), pulmonary thrombosis.
- Brendan Sloan, 67, Northern Irish Gaelic football player (Down).
- Tạ Chí Đại Trường, 77, Vietnamese historian.
- Kevin Turner, 46, American football player (New England Patriots, Philadelphia Eagles), amyotrophic lateral sclerosis.

=== 25 ===
- Abu Ali al-Anbari, 57–59, Iraqi militant, commander of ISIL, bombing.
- Munir Amar, 47–48, Israeli brigadier general, plane crash.
- Ken Barr, 83, Scottish artist.
- Ray Barrett, 81, Australian rules footballer (St Kilda).
- Edmund Battersby, 66, American pianist.
- Shannon Bolin, 99, American actress and singer.
- Terry Brain, 60, British animator (The Trap Door), cancer.
- Lalmuni Chaubey, 73, Indian politician, MP (1996–2009).
- Angela Goodwin, 90, Italian actress (My Friends, Julia and Julia, Come Have Coffee with Us).
- Kazuko Hirabayashi, 82, Japanese choreographer.
- Tofig Ismayilov, 76, Azerbaijani film director, screenwriter and film scholar.
- Ross Jennings, 71, New Zealand television producer (Police Ten 7, Melody Rules), cancer.
- John Morphett, 83, Australian architect.
- Paolo Poli, 86, Italian theater actor.
- David H. Porter, 80, American academic.
- Imre Pozsgay, 82, Hungarian politician, MP (1983–1994).
- Josef Anton Riedl, 86, German composer.
- John Russell, 84, American politician.
- Clodomir Santos de Morais, 87, Brazilian sociologist.
- Ellen Seligman, American-born Canadian publisher.
- Dorothy Martin Simon, 96, American physical chemist.
- David Snellgrove, 95, British Tibetologist.
- Lester Thurow, 77, American political economist.
- Adam Żurowski, 86, Polish geodesist.

=== 26 ===
- Ameli, Duchess of Oldenburg, 93, German royalty.
- Lucas Gomes Arcanjo, 44, Brazilian police officer and political activist.
- David Baker, 84, American jazz musician.
- Raúl Cárdenas, 86, Mexican football player (Zacatepec) and coach (Cruz Azul, national team).
- Michel Duc-Goninaz, 82, French Esperantist.
- Jennifer Frey, 47, American sportswriter, multiple organ failure.
- Francisco García Moreno, 68, Mexican Olympic water polo player (1968, 1972, 1976), 1975 Pan American Games champion, shot.
- Norm Hadley, 51, Canadian rugby union player (London Wasps), suicide by drug overdose.
- Jim Harrison, 78, American author and screenwriter (Legends of the Fall, Wolf, Revenge), heart attack.
- Yoshimi Katayama, 75, Japanese racing driver.
- János Kilián, 93, Hungarian Olympic speed skater.
- Marinko Madžgalj, 37, Serbian actor, singer and television presenter, pancreatic cancer.
- Radu Mareș, 75, Romanian prose writer and journalist.
- Michael MccGwire, 91, British Royal Navy officer and international relations specialist.
- Raymond Menmuir, 85, Australian television director.
- Bernard Neal, 93, British structural engineer and croquet player.
- Paddy O'Brien, 91, Irish Gaelic football player (Meath).
- Igor Pashkevich, 44, Soviet-born Russian Olympic figure skater (1994, 1998), 1990 World Juniors champion.
- John Rodgers, 85, Australian Olympic cyclist.
- Alfredo Sabbadin, 80, Italian cyclist.
- Joe Shepley, 85, American jazz trumpeter.
- Edward Slater, 99, Australian biochemist.
- Andreas Peter Cornelius Sol, 100, Dutch-born Indonesian Roman Catholic prelate, Bishop of Amboina (1965–1994).
- Donald Stoltenberg, 88, American painter.
- Jack Taylor, 87, Canadian Olympic rower.

=== 27 ===
- Aduke Alakija, 95, Nigerian diplomat, ambassador to Sweden (1984–1987).
- Mother Angelica, 92, American Poor Clare nun, founder of the Eternal Word Television Network.
- Vince Boryla, 89, American basketball player and coach (New York Knicks), and general manager (Denver Nuggets), Olympic champion (1948).
- Judy-Joy Davies, 87, Australian swimmer and journalist, Olympic bronze medallist (1948).
- Alain Decaux, 90, French historian, member of the Académie française.
- Antoine Demoitié, 25, Belgian cyclist, race collision.
- Abel Dhaira, 28, Ugandan footballer (national team), abdominal cancer.
- Eric Engberg, 74, American news correspondent.
- Silvio Fogel, 66, Argentine footballer (Puebla), heart attack.
- Toni Grant, 73, American radio host and psychologist.
- Curtis Hertel, 63, American politician, member (1981–1998) and Speaker (1997–1998) of the Michigan House of Representatives.
- Gilbert Horn Sr., 92, American Assiniboine soldier and code talker (Merrill's Marauders).
- Victor Pernac, 94, French cyclist.
- Vic Peters, 60, Canadian curler, 1992 Labatt Brier champion, cancer.
- Anatoly Savin, 95, Soviet and Russian weapons designer, Hero of Socialist Labour.
- Henk Schueler, 93, Dutch speed skater.
- Frank Torley, 75, New Zealand television presenter and producer (Country Calendar, Top Town), cancer.

=== 28 ===
- Gilson Alvaristo, 59, Brazilian professional and Olympic cyclist (1980, 1984).
- Wally Crouter, 92, Canadian radio broadcaster (CFRB).
- Bogdan Denitch, 86, American sociologist.
- Peggy Fortnum, 96, English illustrator (Paddington Bear).
- Yvette Francis-McBarnette, 89, Jamaican-born American pediatrician.
- Nicholas Gargano, 81, British welterweight boxer, Olympic bronze medallist (1956).
- Yves Gominon, 82, French Olympic basketball player.
- Igor Khait, 52, American animation producer (The Lego Movie, Atlantis: The Lost Empire, Brother Bear), pancreatic cancer.
- Manzoor Mirza, 85, Pakistani economist.
- Petru Mocanu, 85, Romanian mathematician.
- Daan Myngheer, 22, Belgian professional cyclist, heart attack.
- James Noble, 94, American actor (Benson, 10, Archie: To Riverdale and Back Again), complications from a stroke.
- Edmund Piątkowski, 80, Polish Olympic discus thrower (1960, 1964, 1968).
- W. Ward Reynoldson, 95, American judge, Chief Justice of the Iowa Supreme Court (1978–1987).
- Josef Simon, 85, German philosopher.
- Mostafa Kamal Tolba, 93, Egyptian scientist, executive director of UNEP (1975–1992), President of Egyptian Olympic Committee (1971–1972).
- Arthur Walker, 63, South African Air Force helicopter pilot.

=== 29 ===
- Baxter LePage, 11, American dog, first dog of Maine (since 2011).
- Grahame Bowen, 69, Australian rugby league player (St. George Dragons, Cronulla-Sutherland Sharks).
- Maxime Camara, 73, Guinean Olympic footballer (1968).
- Raymond F. Clevenger, 89, American politician, Member of the United States House of Representatives from Michigan's 11th congressional district (1965–1967).
- Jean-Pierre Coffe, 78, French television presenter and food critic.
- Yelena Donskaya, 100, Russian Soviet sports shooter, world champion (1958, 1962).
- Patty Duke, 69, American actress (The Miracle Worker, The Patty Duke Show, Valley of the Dolls), President of SAG (1985–1988), Oscar winner (1962), sepsis.
- Frank De Felitta, 94, American author and screenwriter (Audrey Rose).
- Donald Harris, 84, American composer.
- Heikki Hakola, 86, Finnish Olympic wrestler (1960).
- Nil Hilevich, 84, Belarusian poet, cancer.
- Jayakrishna, 67, Indian film producer (Mana Voori Pandavulu).
- Hansruedi Jost, 82, Swiss Olympic hammer thrower.
- Francis Kane, 93, Canadian ice hockey player (Detroit Red Wings).
- Jean Lapierre, 59, Canadian politician, Minister of Transport (2004–2006) and broadcaster (CKAC), plane crash.
- Jean-Philippe L'Huillier, 65, Swiss Olympic sailor.
- Diana Mason, 82, British Olympic equestrian.
- Nana Mchedlidze, 90, Georgian actress and film director.
- Oscar Páez Garcete, 78, Paraguayan Roman Catholic prelate, Bishop of San Pedro (1978–1993) and Alto Paraná (1993–2000).
- Steven Sample, 75, American educator, President of the University at Buffalo (1982–1991) and the University of Southern California (1991–2010).
- Gabriel Singson, 87, Filipino banker, Governor of the Bangko Sentral (1993–1999).
- Vaughn Stocksdale, 76, American politician.
- John Wittenborn, 80, American football player (San Francisco 49ers, Philadelphia Eagles), NFL champion (1960).

=== 30 ===
- Anne Aasheim, 53, Norwegian newspaper editor (Dagbladet), lung cancer.
- Francisco Algora, 67, Spanish actor.
- Jacques Bihozagara, 71, Rwandan politician and diplomat.
- Vladimir Braginsky, 84, Russian physicist.
- Howard Cable, 95, Canadian conductor, composer and arranger.
- Denys Carnill, 90, British field hockey player, Olympic bronze medallist (1952).
- Neil Gunn, 70, Canadian Olympic sailor.
- Gordon Guyer, 89, American educator, President of Michigan State University (1992–1993).
- Shirley Hufstedler, 90, American lawyer and judge, Secretary of Education (1979–1981).
- Mohammad Ferdous Khan, 96, Bangladeshi educationist and politician.
- John King, 77, English football player and manager (Tranmere).
- Marianne Krencsey, 84, Hungarian actress.
- Bernard Lamarre, 84, Canadian soil mechanics engineer and businessman, CEO of Lavalin (1962–1991).
- Seymour Lazar, 88, American lawyer.
- Frankie Michaels, 60, American actor (Mame) and singer, Tony winner (1966).
- Donald Rickard, 88, American diplomat.
- J. Thomas Rosch, 76, American lawyer, Commissioner of Federal Trade Commission (2006–2013), complications of Parkinson's disease.
- Bill Rosendahl, 70, American politician, member of the Los Angeles City Council (2005–2013), cancer.
- Ralph Seitsinger, 100, American politician and businessman, Mayor of El Paso, Texas (1961–1963).
- Ilmari Susiluoto, 68, Finnish political scientist.
- Gianmaria Testa, 57, Italian singer-songwriter.
- Verneda Thomas, 79, American Olympic volleyball player.
- Paul Thyness, 85, Norwegian politician.

=== 31 ===
- Orlando Álvarez, 64, Puerto Rican baseball player (Los Angeles Dodgers, California Angels), complications from diabetes.
- Aníbal Alzate, 83, Colombian footballer.
- Warren E. Barry, 82, American politician.
- Werner Baer, 85, American economist.
- Béla Biszku, 94, Hungarian politician, Minister of the Interior (1957–1961).
- Ian Britton, 61, Scottish football player (Chelsea, Blackpool, Burnley) and manager (Nelson), cancer.
- Tom Butters, 77, American college sports administrator (Duke Blue Devils) and baseball player (Pittsburgh Pirates).
- W. Ray Cadwallader, 84–85, American politician.
- Giorgio Calabrese, 86, Italian songwriter.
- Ronnie Corbett, 85, British comedian and actor (The Two Ronnies, The Frost Report, Casino Royale), motor neurone disease.
- Georges Cottier, 93, Swiss Roman Catholic cardinal, Theologian of the Pontifical Household (1990–2005).
- Maurice DeLory, 88, Canadian politician.
- Amaury Epaminondas, 80, Brazilian footballer (São Paulo F.C., Deportivo Toluca F.C.).
- Ross Ewington, 68, New Zealand Olympic alpine skier.
- Sir Robert Finch, 71, British businessman, Lord Mayor of London (2003).
- Edgar Fredricks, 73, American politician.
- Hans-Dietrich Genscher, 89, German politician, Minister of the Interior (1969–1974) and Foreign Affairs (1974–1982; 1982–1992), Vice Chancellor (1974–1982; 1982–1992), heart failure.
- Dame Zaha Hadid, 65, Iraqi-born British architect, heart attack.
- Imre Kertész, 86, Hungarian writer, Nobel Prize laureate (2002), complications from Parkinson's disease.
- Stephen May, 84, American politician.
- Leonard Mayaen, 63, Filipino politician, Governor of Mountain Province (1998–2001, since 2010), cardiac arrest.
- Margarita McCoy, 92, American urban planner and educator.
- Fernando Mendes, 78, Portuguese football player and manager (Sporting CP).
- Ken Moore, 90, Canadian football player.
- David Ostler, 84, American politician.
- André Paris, 90, French Olympic athlete.
- Eugene Parker, 60, American sports agent.
- Terry Plumeri, 71, American musician, conductor and composer, homicide.
- Khuzaima Qutbuddin, 75, Indian Islamic leader.
- Denise Robertson, 83, British writer and television broadcaster (This Morning), pancreatic cancer.
- Bill Robinson, 87, American football player (Green Bay Packers).
- Bertil Roos, 72, Swedish racing driver and instructor.
- Robert M. Sayre, 91, American diplomat.
- Jimmy Toner, 92, Scottish footballer (Dundee, Leeds United).
- Kris Travis, 32, English wrestler, cancer.
- Gheorghe Vrabie, 77, Moldovan artist, designer of the coat of arms, seal of Chișinău and the leu.
- Ward Wettlaufer, 80, American golfer.
- Douglas Wilmer, 96, English actor (Sherlock Holmes, Octopussy, Jason and the Argonauts).
