= Ruohonen =

Ruohonen is a Finnish surname. Notable people with the surname include:

- Ilkka Ruohonen (1958–2016), Finnish cultural anthropologist and documentary filmmaker
- Laura Ruohonen (born 1960), Finnish playwright and theatre director
- Rich Ruohonen (born 1971), American curler
- Seppo Ruohonen (1946–2020), Finnish opera singer
- Matti ja Teppo Ruohonen, Finnish pop singer duo

== See also ==
- Pirkko Ruohonen-Lerner (born 1957), Finnish politician
