= Henk Schueler =

Dutch speed skater

Henk Schueler (28 May 1922, Barneveld – 27 March 2016, Wijchen) was a Dutch male speed skater. He represented the Netherlands at the European Speed Skating Championships in 1953 and 1954. Between 1942 and 1997 he skated the Elfstedentocht seven times, including the heroic one in 1963. As a senior rider he rode two world records in 2002 at the age of 80 in Davos and became senior world all–round speed skating champion in 2003. He was a fanatic sportsman doing speed skating, cycling and Nordic walking right up until his death.

== Personal ==
He had his own furniture shop since 1955 in De Heuvel.
