= Richard Albertine =

American photographer

- Born: May 31, 1944; Norwich, Connecticut, U.S.
- Died: March 23, 2016 (aged 71); Baton Rouge, Louisiana, U.S.
- Education: Massachusetts Institute of Technology

Richard Chase Albertine (May 31, 1944 – March 23, 2016) was an American photographer. His work contributed to the elevation of snapshot-style portraits to the canon of American photography. Later in his life, Albertine focused on depictions of Louisiana's flora, documenting oaks, cypresses, swamp scenes and decaying plants. A lifelong experimenter, he often enhanced his images with the split tone technique.

== Life and work ==
Richard Albertine was born in Norwich, Connecticut in 1944. He started photographing as a teenager and won his first cash prize in a photography contest organized by The Hartford Times newspaper in Connecticut. He entered Ambrose Street Kids (1963), a portrait of three homeless children from the streets of Rochester, New York

After serving in the Air Force during the Vietnam War, Albertine returned to New England. During the 1970s, his work focused on capturing his family in spontaneous moments. Experimenting with elements available at home, he sought to elevate his everyday life through composition. Lisa (1971) the portrait of his infant daughter behind a screen, and Kelly (1971) a portrait of his son under the window, are examples of this effort. In 1974 these photographs were published in The Snapshot, a volume edited by Jonathan Green and published by Aperture that sought to highlight artists working with unposed snapshot photography.

At the same time, Albertine continued to invest in his formal education. He enrolled in the Rochester Institute of Technology photography program, and graduated with a bachelor's degree in 1970. He then went to graduate school at the Massachusetts Institute of Technology, where he studied under Minor White. Last Shooting Trip with Minor White (1971) is a testament to their relationship.

For a few years in the mid 1970s, Albertine and his family lived in the "ghost" town of Silver City, Idaho. This town dates from the 1860s and was once a booming mining town, but by the 1970s had only about 70 standing buildings, no permanent residents, no electricity, no local government, no stores, and no services. Access to the town required travel over 20 miles on a 4-wheel-drive dirt road. The Albertines purchased an 916 square-foot original 1800s "miner's cabin" and lived there in the winters as well as the summers. At times, they were the only humans in the town. Albertine documented the town's architecture and its buildings in photographs during this time as he continued to explore and experiment in his artistic craft.

In 1978, Albertine moved to Baton Rouge, Louisiana and worked for Gris Gris, a local magazine. He photographed personalities such as singer Irma Thomas and governor Edwin Edwards. In November of that year he authored an article commenting on his practice. Albertine published three photographs of his children, explaining that a deep sense of spirituality permeated his photographs, and that while his primary medium was light, his relationships informed his practice just as much.

During the late 1980s Albertine turned his subject to the flora of Louisiana. His depictions of Avery Island, a nature reserve near the Louisiana coast, became a feature of his oeuvre. Exhibitions of this period focused on views of live oaks and palms endemic of the island, as well as flora in the banks of the Mississippi River and other wild areas.

Albertine secured an Artist Sponsorship deal with Polaroid during the early 1990s, in which the company provided photographers with supplies in exchange for regular exhibitions to showcase their equipment. Albertine's Polaroid Portraits series returned the subject matter to snapshots of his social life. He experimented with alternative light sources and movement, frequently combining camera flash with the ‘bulb’ shutter setting of his Polaroid 110A. The result is an array of dynamic compositions that are full of energy and movement. These photographs were exhibited in a one-man show in Baton Rouge, LA.

In 1996, his work was featured alongside A. J. Meek and a dozen others in Susan Sipple Elliot's book The South by its Photographers.

Richard Albertine died in March 2016.
