= Timothée Modibo-Nzockena =

Roman Catholic bishop

- Bishop of Franceville
- Church: Catholic Church
- In office: 8 November 1996 – 24 March 2016
- Predecessor: Félicien Makouaka
- Successor: Jean-Patrick Iba-Ba

Orders
- Ordination: 22 June 1980
- Consecration: 11 January 1997 by Jozef Tomko

Personal details
- Born: 1 January 1950 Mbomo (north of Oyem), Colony of Gabon, French Equatorial Africa, French Empire
- Died: 24 March 2016 (aged 66)

Timothée Modibo-Nzockena (1 January 1950 – 24 March 2016) was a Roman Catholic bishop.

Ordained to the priesthood in 1980, Modibo-Mzockena was appointed bishop in 1997 of the Roman Catholic Diocese of Franceville, Gabon. He served as bishop until his death.
