= Mary Ann Scherr =

American multidisciplinary designer

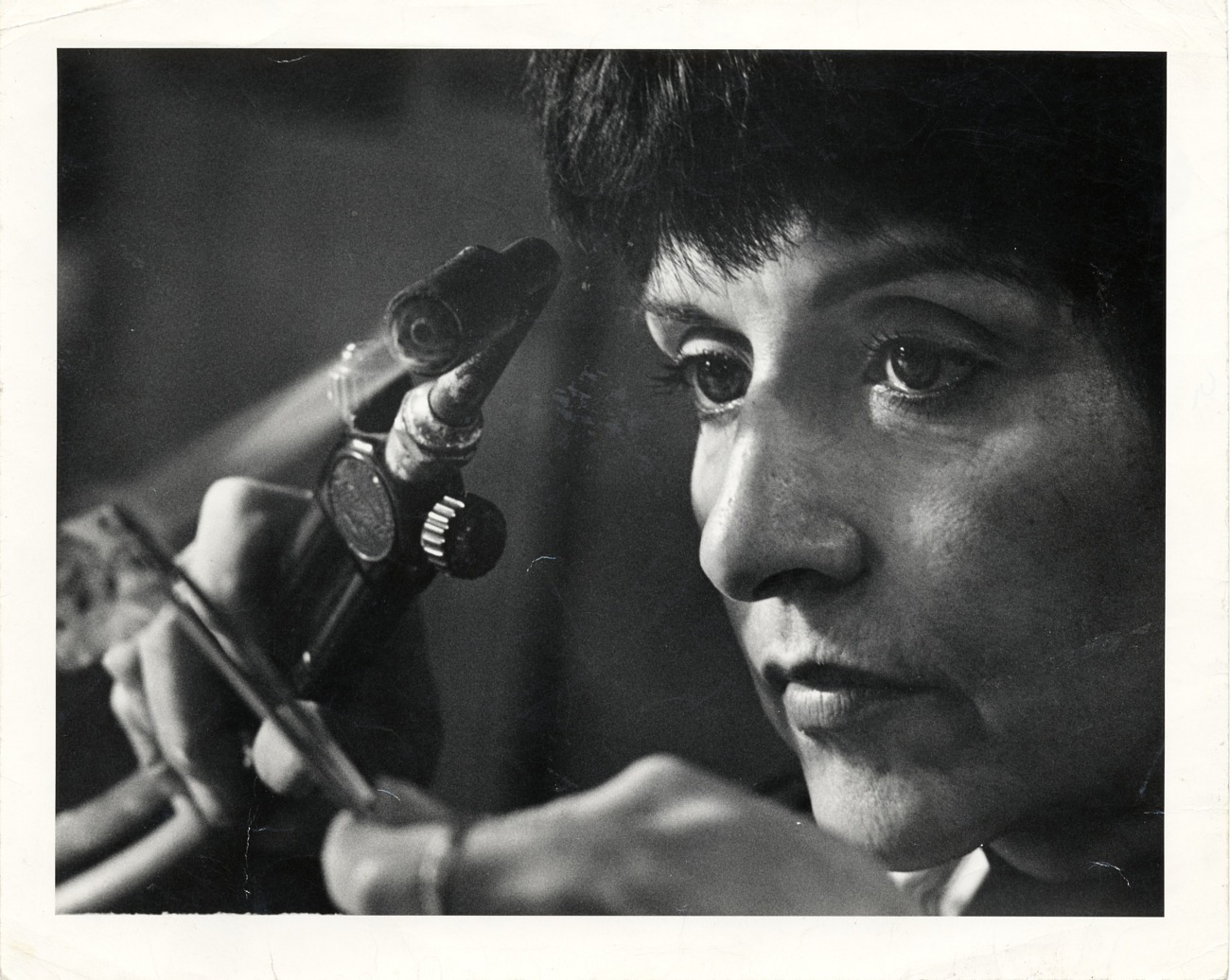
- Mary Ann Scherr (c. 1970)
- Born: Mary Ann Weckman; August 3, 1921; Akron, Ohio, U.S.
- Died: March 1, 2016 (aged 94); Raleigh, North Carolina, U.S.
- Education: Cleveland Institute of Art, University of Akron, Kent State University
- Spouse: Samuel Scherr
- Children: 3
- Parents: Clarence Alexis Weckman (father); Loretta Gorbach (mother)

Mary Ann Scherr (née Weckman; 1921 – 2016) was an American designer, metalsmith and educator. She was known for her jewellery design and industrial design, but she also worked as a graphic designer, illustrator, game designer, fashion and costume designer and silversmith.

Scherr was one of the first female automobile designers, working on the design for Ford, Mercury, and Lincoln. She is known for her pioneering methods of designing with materials such as stainless steel, aluminum, and titanium.

== Early life and education ==
She was born as Mary Ann Weckman on August 3, 1921 in Akron, Ohio. Her father Clarence Alexis Weckman (1896–1975) was from Ohio and of Alsace-Lorraine descent; her mother Loretta Laura (née Gorbach) Weckman (1895–1990) was from Berlin, Germany. Her father was a self taught mechanic and inventor who invented a threading mechanism for rubber (sold to Goodrich), and her mother was a seamstress. She began drawing at an early age.

Scherr attended Schumacher Elementary School in Akron. She studied at Cleveland Institute of Art, University of Akron, and Kent State University.

In May 1947, she was married to Samuel Scherr, an industrial designer and art collector who later served as director of the American Craft Council. The couple had met in Akron and at the Cleveland Institute of Art. Together they had three children, two sons and a daughter.

== Career ==
After graduation she worked as an illustrator at Goodyear Aircraft Corporation. She later worked at Ford Motor Company and the Aluminum Company of America. She designed both the interior and exterior of cars made by Ford, Mercury, and Lincoln.

In 1963, the United States Steel Company commissioned Scherr to create industrial-style stainless steel jewelry, which became a signature style. In the early 1970s she began making jewelry with either self tracking or medical purposes, the early designs were called "trach necklaces", for people who had tracheotomy surgery the necklance would slip into place with a medical device and cover the surgical opening so the patient no longer felt a need to hide their neck. She also designed a heart monitoring necklace; a bracelet that monitors the pulse rate and displays the results through a light-emitting diode; a pendant with a 10-minute supply of oxygen; a portable electrocardiograph necklace; and others.

She moved to New York City in the late 1970s. She served as the Chair of the Product Design Department at Parsons School of Design from 1979 to 1989. Starting in 1968 and onwards, she taught summer courses at Penland School of Crafts. Scherr became an American Crafts Council (ACC) fellow in 1983.

In 1989, she moved to Raleigh, North Carolina where she taught at Duke University, Meredith College, and North Carolina State University.

== Death and legacy ==
Scherr died at the age of 94 on March 1, 2016, in her home in Raleigh. Her jewelry and metalwork can be found in the public museum collections at Smithsonian American Art Museum, Metropolitan Museum of Art, Museum of Arts and Design, Museum of Fine Arts, Houston, Museum of Fine Arts, Boston, Yale University Art Gallery, Vatican Museum of Art, and others.

In 2020, Scherr had her first retrospective exhibition, All is Possible: Mary Ann Scherr's Legacy in Metal, curated by Ana Estrades and held at the Gregg Museum of Art and Design in Raleigh, North Carolina,
