= Brenda Naylor =

British sculptor

Brenda Naylor (5 July 1926 – 11 March 2016) was a British sculptor, known for her bronzes of dancers and sportspeople such as Rudolf Nureyev and Tip Foster.

Born Brenda Clark on 5 July 1926 in Lewisham, London, she was one of four children of a Yorkshire-born watch and clockmaker father.

She was educated at St Martin's College as a fashion sketch artist, and started working for Norman Hartnell in 1943, in a ten-year career.
