= Retta Ward =

Politician (1953–2016)

Retta Ward (May 4, 1953 – March 3, 2016) was an American health advocate, health official and former high school teacher. She served as the state Secretary of the New Mexico Department of Health, the largest government agency in the state, from January 2013 until her death in March 2016, during the administration of Governor Susana Martinez.

Ward had first joined Governor Susana Martinez's administration in February 2011 as the state cabinet Secretary of Aging and Long-Term Services Department. Governor Martinez then appointed Ward as Secretary of the New Mexico Department of Health. Martinez then appointed Ward as the state Secretary of the Department of Health, New Mexico's largest government department, beginning in January 2013.

Retta Ward was raised in New Mexico. She received a bachelor's degree in health education from the University of New Mexico and her master's degree in public health from the University of Arizona.

Ward began her career as a high school biology teacher in the neighboring state of Arizona. She had previously headed the arthritis department at the Arizona Department of Health Services and taught as a health educator at the Albuquerque Public Schools before joining the Martinez administration in January 2011.

In addition to her role as New Mexico Secretary of Health, Ward oversaw fourteen training centers throughout the United States as a head of operations for The Hertz Corporation. She had also worked as a Hertz manager based in Albuquerque, Chicago and New York City.

Retta Ward died on March 3, 2016, after a medical emergency led to a single car accident in Santa Fe, New Mexico. She was 62 years old.
