= José Ramón Herrero Merediz =

Spanish politician (1931–2016)

Member of the Senate for Asturias
- In office 28 October 1982 – 26 March 1996

Member of the European Parliament
- In office 1 January 1986 – 5 July 1987

Personal details
- Born: 2 February 1931 Gijón, Spain
- Died: 19 March 2016 (aged 85) Gijón, Spain
- Party: Communist Party of Spain (Until 1978) Spanish Socialist Workers' Party (Until 2014)

José Ramón Herrero Merediz (2 February 1931 – 19 March 2016) was a Spanish politician. In his youth, he was active for the Communist Party of Spain and subsequently spend several years in prison. He was a member of the Senate of Spain for the Spanish Socialist Workers' Party between 1982 and 1996. Between 1986 and 1987, he was a member of the European Parliament.

== Career ==
Herrero Merediz was born on 2 February 1931 in Gijón. In 1956, when he was 25, he became active for the Communist Party of Spain. In 1960, during the period of Francoist Spain, he was sentenced to fourteen year imprisonment. After seven years he was released due to several pardons. He subsequently worked as a lawyer, mainly for anti-Franco activists. In 1978 Herrero Merediz left the Communist Party and shortly afterwards joined the Spanish Socialist Workers' Party (PSOE).

Herrero Merediz was member of the Senate of Spain for Asturias for the PSOE. He served in the Legislatures II to V, and held office between 28 October 1982 and 26 March 1996. From 1 January 1986 to 6 July 1987 he was concurrently member of the European Parliament, when Spain had just entered the Union.

From 2004 to 2007 he was the President of the Consejo Social of the University of Oviedo. He was invited to the office by Vicente Álvarez Areces. In 2014 he left the PSOE.

Herrero Merediz was married and had two children. He died in Gijón on 19 March 2016, aged 85.
