= Ward Cates =

American epidemiologist and public health advocate

- Born: November 16, 1942; Cleveland, Ohio, US
- Died: March 17, 2016 (aged 73); Chapel Hill, North Carolina, US
- Education: Yale University MD, MPH
- Spouse: Joan Roberts Cates
- Children: Deborah Cates Knighton; Sarah Cates Parker
- Scientific career
- Fields: Epidemiology; Public health
- Institutions: Centers for Disease Control and Prevention; FHI 360

Willard Cates Jr. (November 16, 1942 – March 17, 2016) was an American epidemiologist and public health advocate known for his work on HIV/AIDS and women's health. In 1974, he began working at the Epidemic Intelligence Service of the Centers for Disease Control and Prevention (CDC), where he researched the epidemiology of abortion. He served as director of the CDC's Division of Sexually Transmitted Diseases from 1982 to 1992. In 1994, he began working at FHI 360, where he became president of the Institute for Family Health in 1998. He was a member of the Institute of Medicine and served as president of both the Society for Epidemiologic Research and the Association of Reproductive Health Professionals.
