= David Ostler =

American politician (1931–2016)

Member of the Utah House of Representatives from the 37th district
- In office 1987–1992

Personal details
- Born: June 17, 1931 Nephi, Utah, U.S.
- Died: March 31, 2016 (aged 84) Salt Lake City, Utah, U.S.
- Party: Republican
- Education: Brigham Young University; Harvard Business School

David Ostler (June 17, 1931 – March 31, 2016) was an American politician. He served as a Republican member for the 37th district of the Utah House of Representatives from 1987 to 1992.
