= Thomas J. Turner (Georgia politician) =

American politician (1932–2016)

Member of the Georgia House of Representatives
- In office 1971–1974

Personal details
- Born: May 11, 1932 Stephens County, Georgia, U.S.
- Died: March 18, 2016 (aged 83)
- Party: Democratic
- Education: Furman University; Florida State University

Thomas J. Turner (May 11, 1932 – March 18, 2016) was an American politician. He served as a Democratic member of the Georgia House of Representatives.

== Life and career ==
Turner was born in Stephens County, Georgia. He attended Furman University and Florida State University.

Turner served in the Georgia House of Representatives from 1971 to 1974.

Turner died in 2016.
