= Léonie Geisendorf =

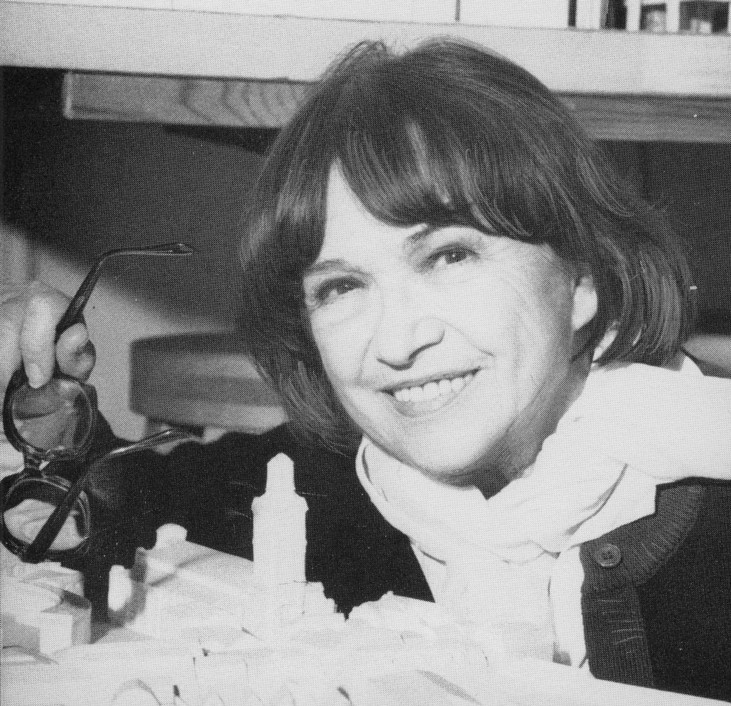
- Geisendorf, c. 1965
- Born: Leonia Maria Kolin-Kaplan; 8 April 1914; Łódź, Poland
- Died: 17 March 2016 (aged 101); Paris, France
- Education: Eidgenössische Technische Hochschule Zürich
- Occupation: Architect
- Awards: Prince Eugen Medal
- Design: Villa Delin (1970); St. Görans Gymnasium (1961)

Léonie Geisendorf, born Leonia Maria Kolin-Kaplan (8 April 1914 – 17 March 2016), was a Polish-born, Swedish architect. She lived most of her professional life in Stockholm, Sweden. At the time of her death, she was living in Paris, France. Notable works include St. Görans Gymnasium in Stockholm.

== Education and career ==
Born in Łódź, Poland, she studied architecture at Eidgenössische Technische Hochschule Zürich followed by an internship with Le Corbusier, who became a source of inspiration and a mentor. In 1938, after her internship, Geisendorf moved to Sweden and was hired by architects Sven Ivar Lind (1902-1980) and Paul Hedqvist (1895-1977). Counting as her first own work is a proposal for a new office building, drawn together with Ralph Erskine and Curt Laudon (1906-1964).

In 1940, she married Swiss architect Charles-Edouard Geisendorf (1913-1985). In 1950 Geisendorf and her husband started their own architectural firm, L. & C. E. Geisendorf, in Stockholm with a branch in Zurich. Together they designed both private and public work. Notable works include Villa Ranängen at Djursholm (1950-1951), Villa Delin (1966) and St. Görans Gymnasium, (1970).

In 2003, for her achievements in the field of architecture, she was awarded by King Carl XVI Gustaf of Sweden, Prince Eugen Medal.

== Images ==
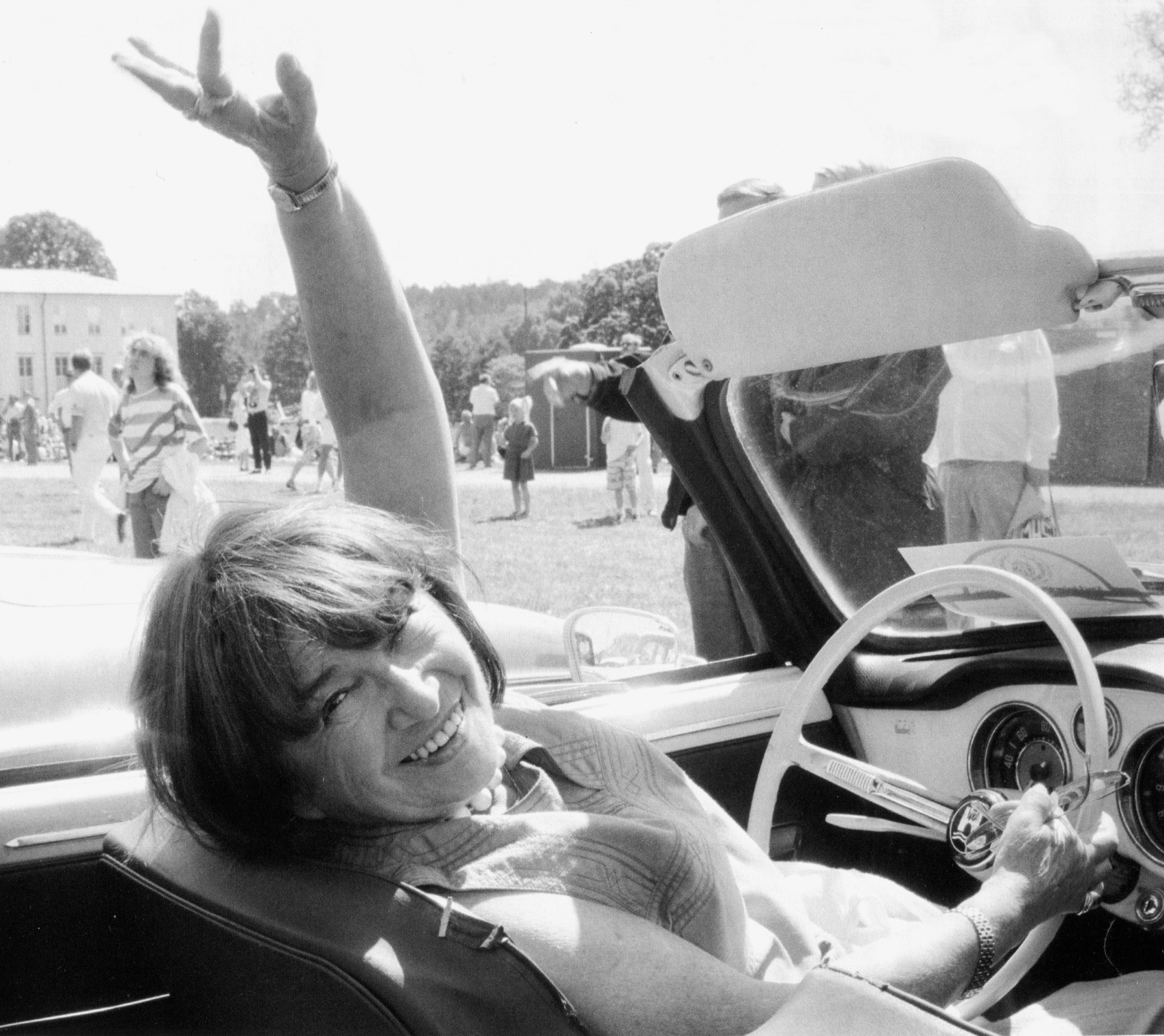
Geisendorf in her Karman Ghia, 1990

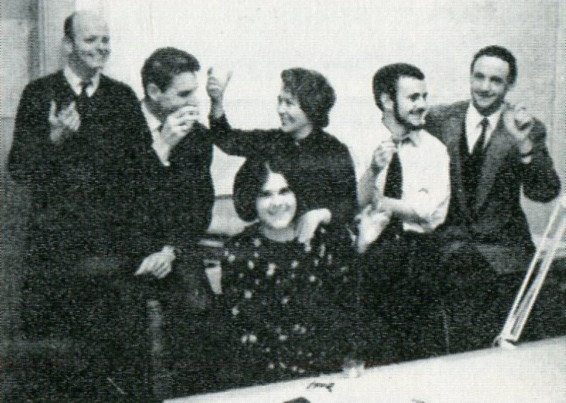
Geisendorf's office mid-1960s (Léonie standing in the middle).

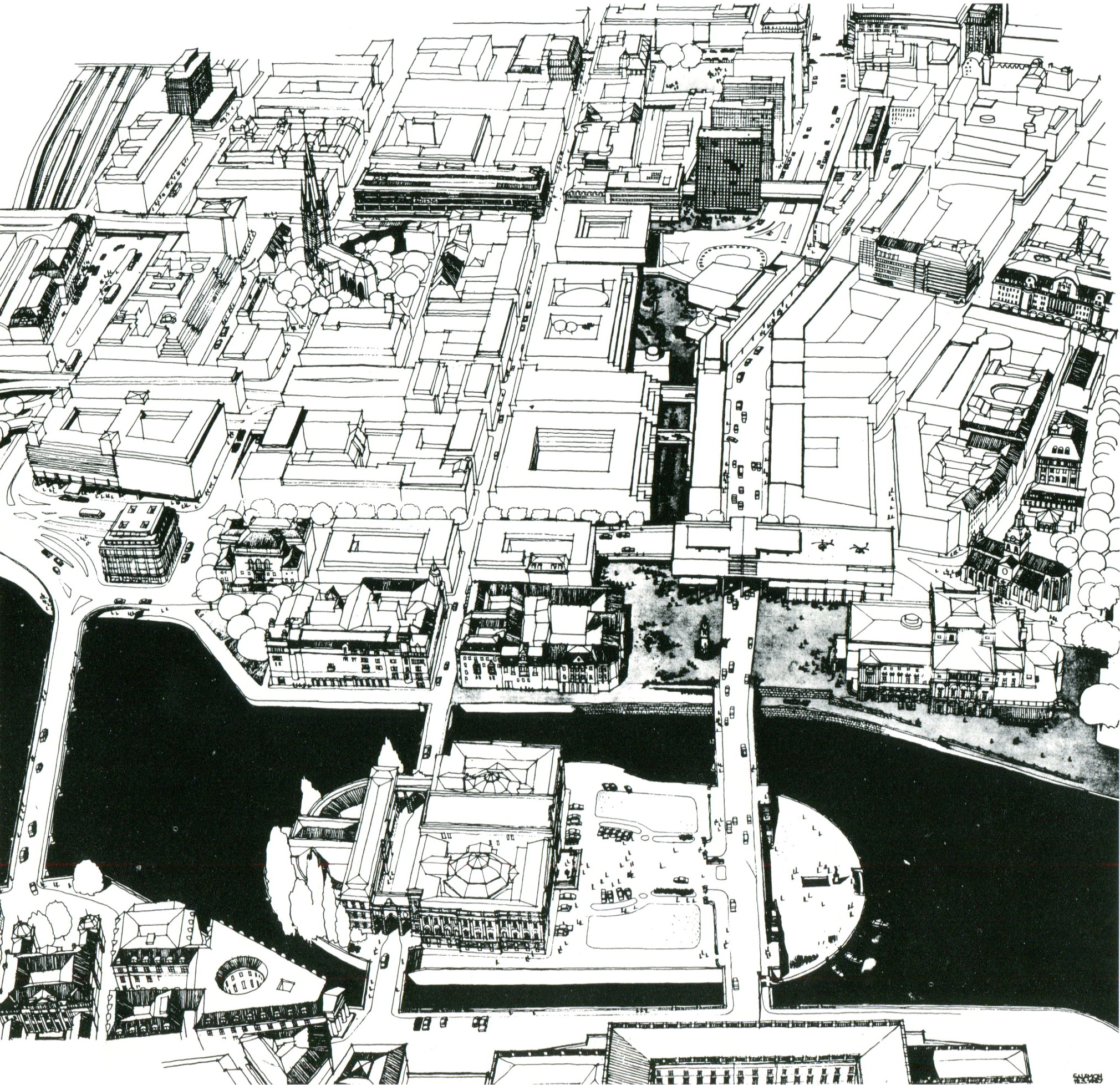
Suggested zoning "Corso" in Stockholm 1965.

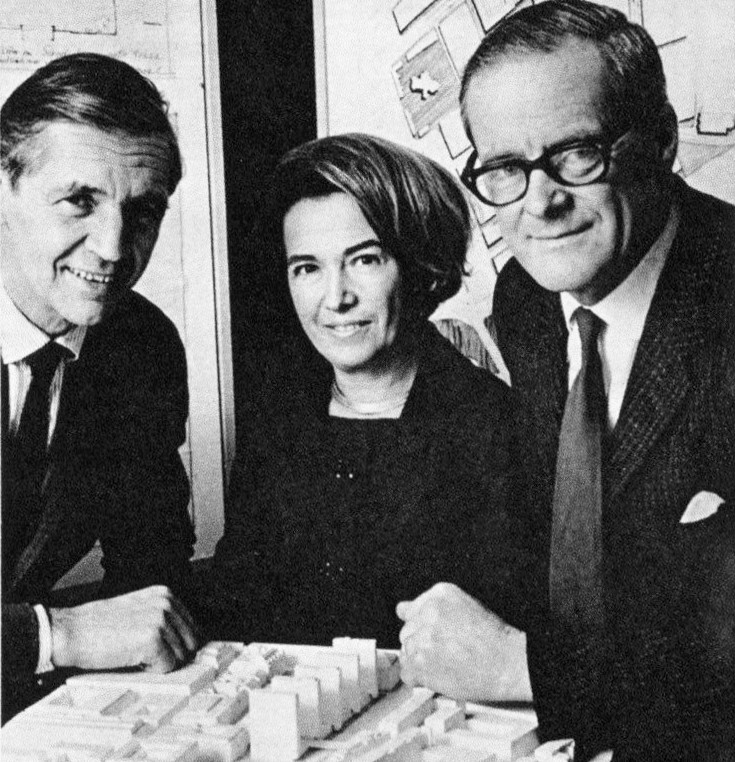
ETG-group: Anders Tengbom, Léonie Geisendorf and Ralph Erskine

== Images, buildings ==
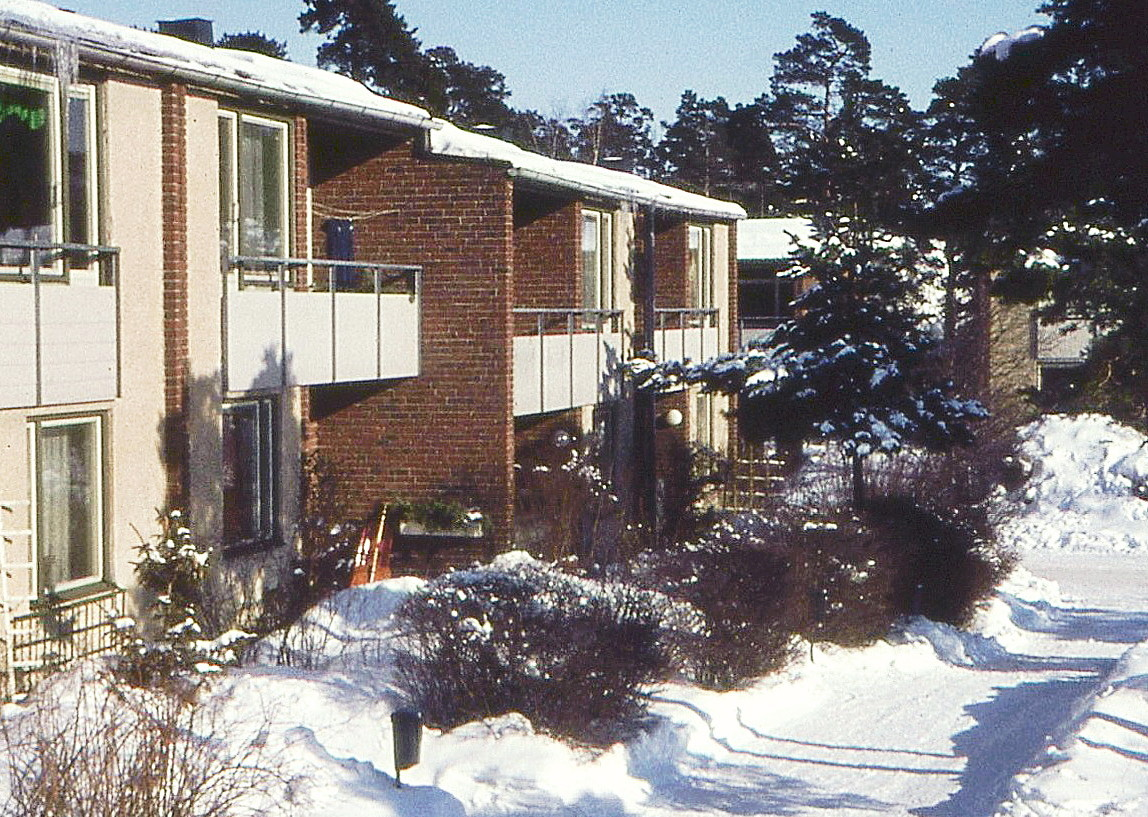
Residential area Riksrådsvägen

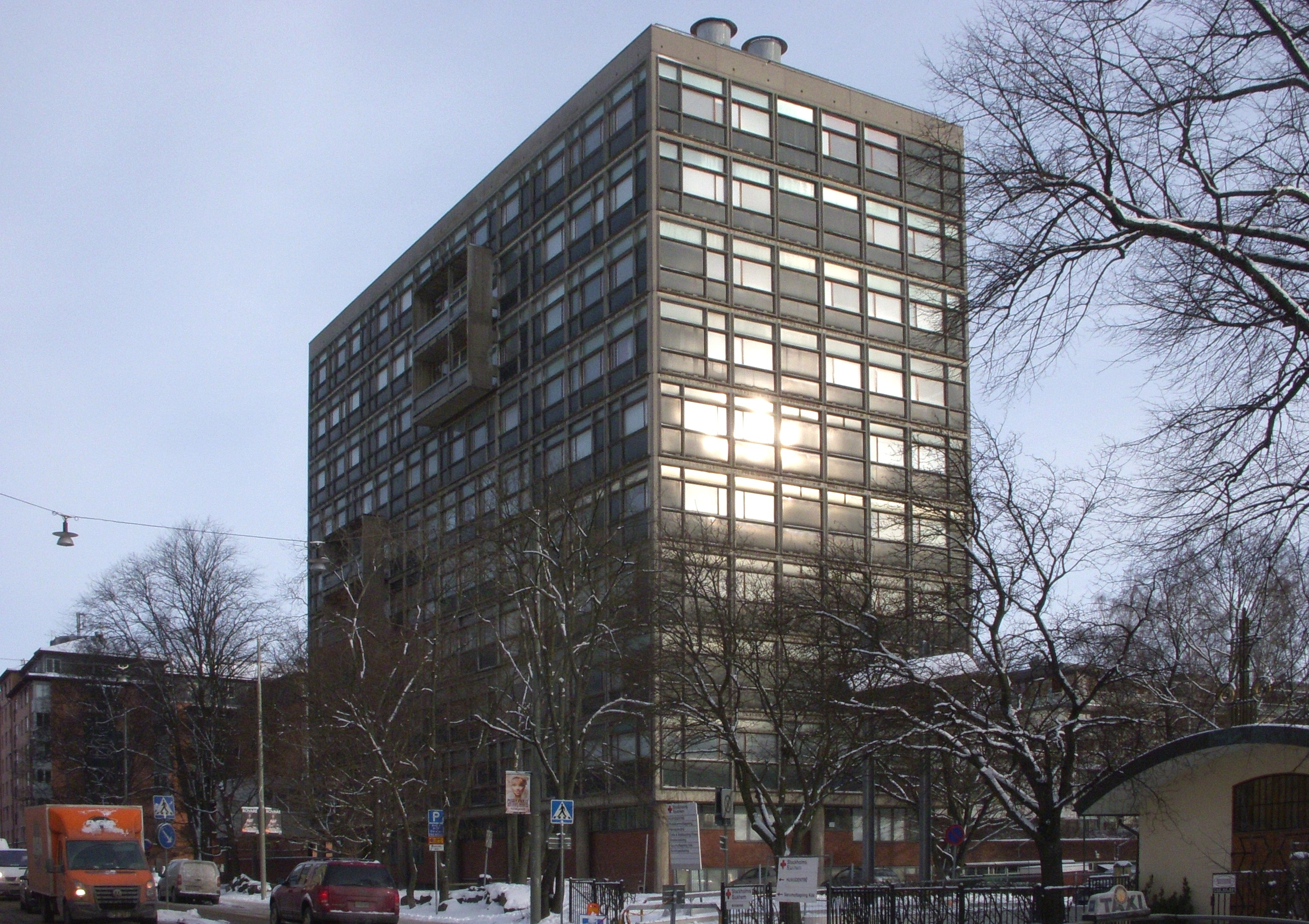
St. Görans Gymnasium

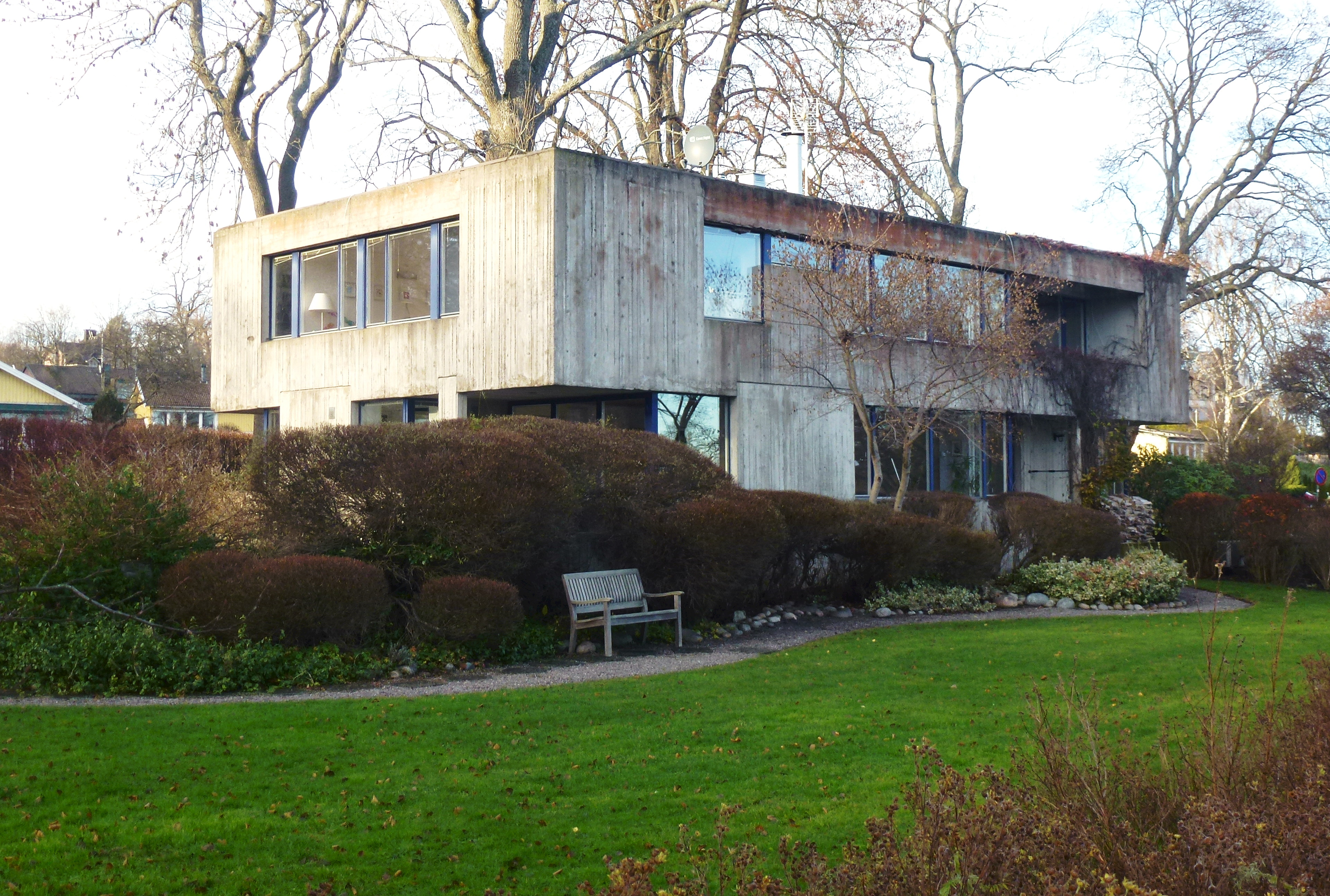
Villa Delin

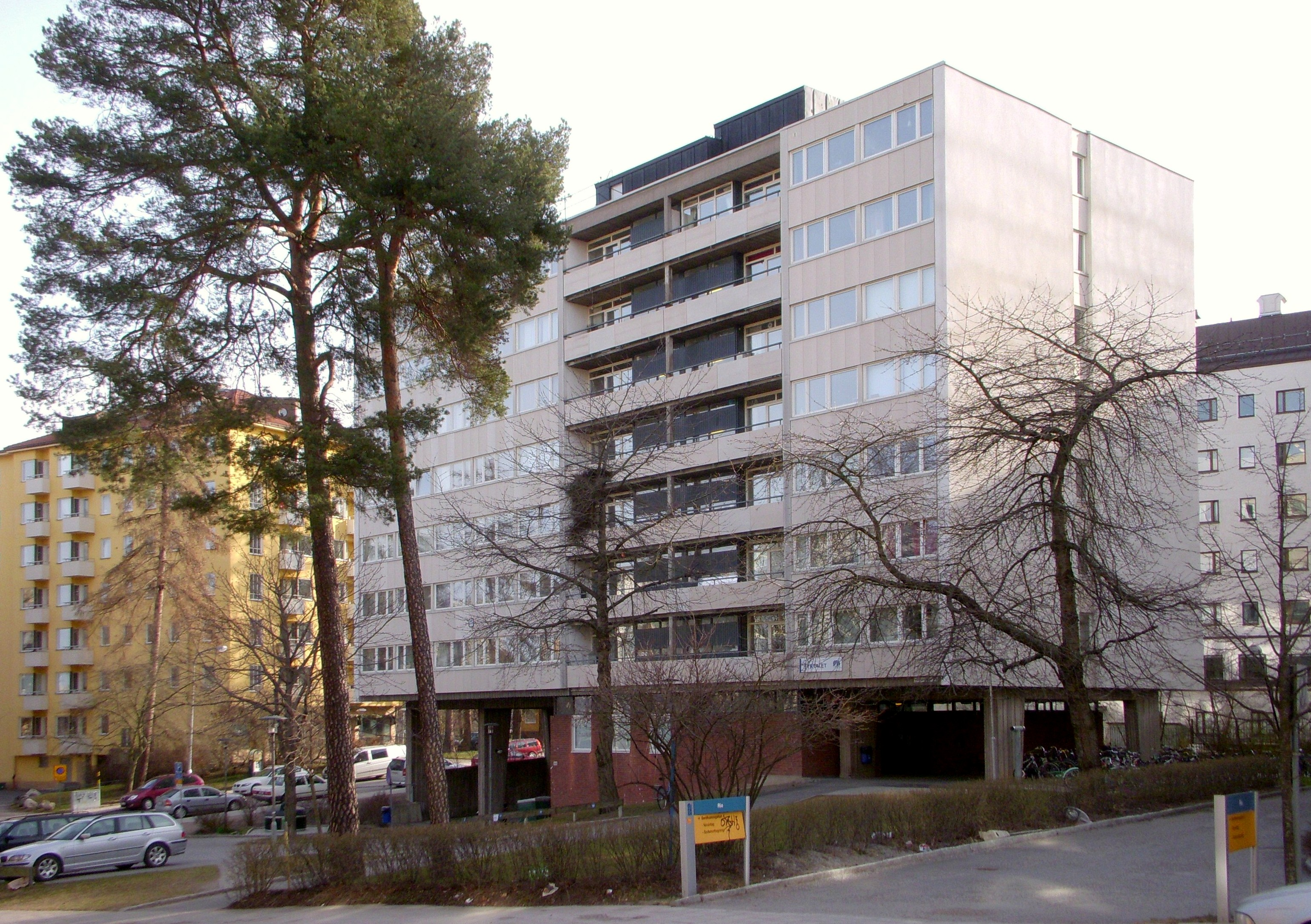
Student housing Fyrtalet

== Sources ==
Geisendorf, Léonie; Gullström Charlie (1990). Arkitektur. Stockholm: Byggförlaget. Libris 7678723. ISBN 91-7988-019-3

Daniel A. Walser, Léonie Geisendorf (1914-2016), Nachruf. In: Werk, bauen + wohnen, Nr. 6, 2016, S. 6
