= Odo Fusi Pecci =

Italian prelate of Roman Catholic Church

- Bishop of Diocese of Senigallia Emeritus
- Church: Roman Catholic Church
- See: Diocese of Senigallia
- In office: 1971–1997
- Predecessor: Umberto Ravetta
- Successor: Giuseppe Orlandoni

Orders
- Ordination: 19 December 1942

Personal details
- Born: 29 June 1920 Cingoli, Italy
- Died: 20 March 2016 (aged 95)

Odo Fusi Pecci (29 June 1920 – 20 March 2016) was an Italian prelate of the Roman Catholic Church. Fusi Pecci was born in Cingoli, Italy, and was ordained a priest on 19 December 1942. He was appointed Bishop of the Diocese of Senigallia on 15 July 1971, where he would remain until his retirement on 21 January 1997. He died in March 2016.
