= Louis Meyers =

American SXSW music and film festival co-founder (1955–2016)

Louis Jay Meyers
- Born: June 21, 1955; Austin, Texas, U.S.
- Died: March 11, 2016 (aged 60); Austin, Texas, U.S.
- Occupations: Festival organizer, musician, producer
- Organizations: Folk Alliance International (executive director, 2005–2013)
- Known for: Co-founder of South by Southwest

Louis Jay Meyers (June 21, 1955 – March 11, 2016) was an American festival organizer and co-founder of South By Southwest. Meyers was the event's primary music booker until he sold his share in the event after the 1994 conference, citing stress and health concerns.

== Early life ==
He was born in Austin, Texas.

== Professional career ==
Meyers was also an accomplished multi-instrumentalist and producer. From 2005 to 2013, Meyers was executive director of Folk Alliance International.

== Death ==
Meyers was admitted to a hospital on March 10, 2016, and initially was diagnosed with blood clots. He then died of a suspected heart attack the next day at his home, at the age of 60.
