= Seymour Lazar =

American lawyer

Seymour Manuel Lazar (June 14, 1927 – March 30, 2016) was an American lawyer known for his flamboyant personal life, prominent celebrity clients, and high-stakes investments, and his part in an illegal kickback scheme.

== Personal life ==
Lazar was born in Brooklyn to Orthodox Jewish parents. His family moved to a ranch in the San Fernando Valley in Los Angeles when Lazar was young. By the time he was 12, Lazar was keeping the books for his father's accounting business. He graduated from Los Angeles High School in 1943, took a job at Lockheed, and enrolled pre-law at University of California, Berkeley. He was drafted into the Army Air Corps, served two years, and then returned to his studies. In 1949, he graduated from Berkeley with a degree in economics, and in 1951, from University of Southern California with a law degree.

His first marriage ended in divorce. His second marriage, to Alyce Lou, lasted until his death. He has three children from his two marriages.

== Entertainment law ==
Early on in Lazar's career he specialized entertainment law. His clients included Bob Dylan, Miles Davis, Joni Mitchell, Lenny Bruce, and the Beatles. He dated Maya Angelou when she was working as a cabaret singer. She later stated that he helped launch her career as a poet.

== Stock trading ==
In the 1960s, Lazar began investing in oil wells in Texas and Louisiana, a Spanish-language newspaper, timberland in Indonesia, and stocks. According to New York Magazine, he became "the single largest individual stock trader during the sixties", buying and selling more tham $300 million in stocks in 1967 alone. Most of these investments were related to mergers and acquisitions. He had a few big losses, including a proposed merger between Armour and General Host (owner of Frank's Nursery & Crafts) that fell through in 1969.

== The Latter-day Saint will ==
In 1976, Lazar joined a group that was trying to prove that a will found in the headquarters of the Church of Jesus Christ of Latter-day Saints in Salt Lake City was the final will of Howard Hughes. Lazar invested $250,000 in the investigation. A Nevada jury ruled that the will was a fake.

== Milberg Weiss kickback scheme ==
Lazar developed a professional relationship with Milberg Weiss, a New York law firm known for handling class-action lawsuits. Over a period of about 25 years, he and members of his family participated, as plaintiffs, in over 50 class-action suits against companies like Hertz and United Airlines. In 2005, a federal investigation of these activities led to an indictment against Lazar for taking $2.6 million in kickbacks from Milberg Weiss. He was charged with mail fraud and money-laundering. In 2007, Lazar plead guilty to obstruction of justice, filing a false tax return and making a false declaration; he was sentenced to six months of home detention and ordered to pay a $600,000 fine, on top of a previously ordered $1.5 million forfeiture.

Lazar died at his home in Palm Springs in 2016.

In 2016, Lazar's daughter, Tara Lazar, opened a speakeasy in Palm Springs and named it Seymour's after her father.
