= Eliot Gant =

Elliot Gant (March 21, 1926 – March 12, 2016) was an American garment businessman and an executive for the retailer Gant.

== Life ==
He was born in Brooklyn and was the son of Bernard Gantmacher. He served in the United States Navy during World War II and graduated from University of Connecticut. He developed the family's shirt business, which operated a factory in New Haven. The business was sold to Consolidated Foods in 1968.

He died in Boston.
