= Munir Amar =

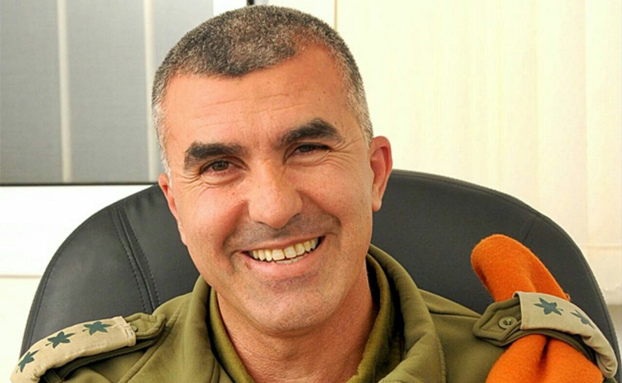
Munir Amar

Munir Amar (Arabic: منير عمار, Hebrew: מוניר עמאר; 1968 – March 25, 2016) was an Israeli Druze military officer and politician. Amar died on 25 March 2016 after the small plane he was piloting crashed in Upper Galilee.

== Biography ==
Amar was the Head of the IDF Civil Administration and Brigadier-General. He was killed on 25 March 2016 when his light plane crashed into a mountain in the Upper Galilee, in northern Israel. Amar began his military service in the Herev infantry battalion, the battalion was known for the fierce loyalty and solidarity of its soldiers. Amar eventually rose to command the battalion. Later in his service, Amar was appointed head of the Home Front Command for the Haifa area, and then commander of the Hermon Brigade on Israel's northern border.

At the time of his death, Amar was the chief of the Civil Administration of the West Bank, which functions as a subdivision of the Coordinator of Government Activities in the Territories Unit (COGAT).
