= David M. Gates =

American ecologist (1921–2016)

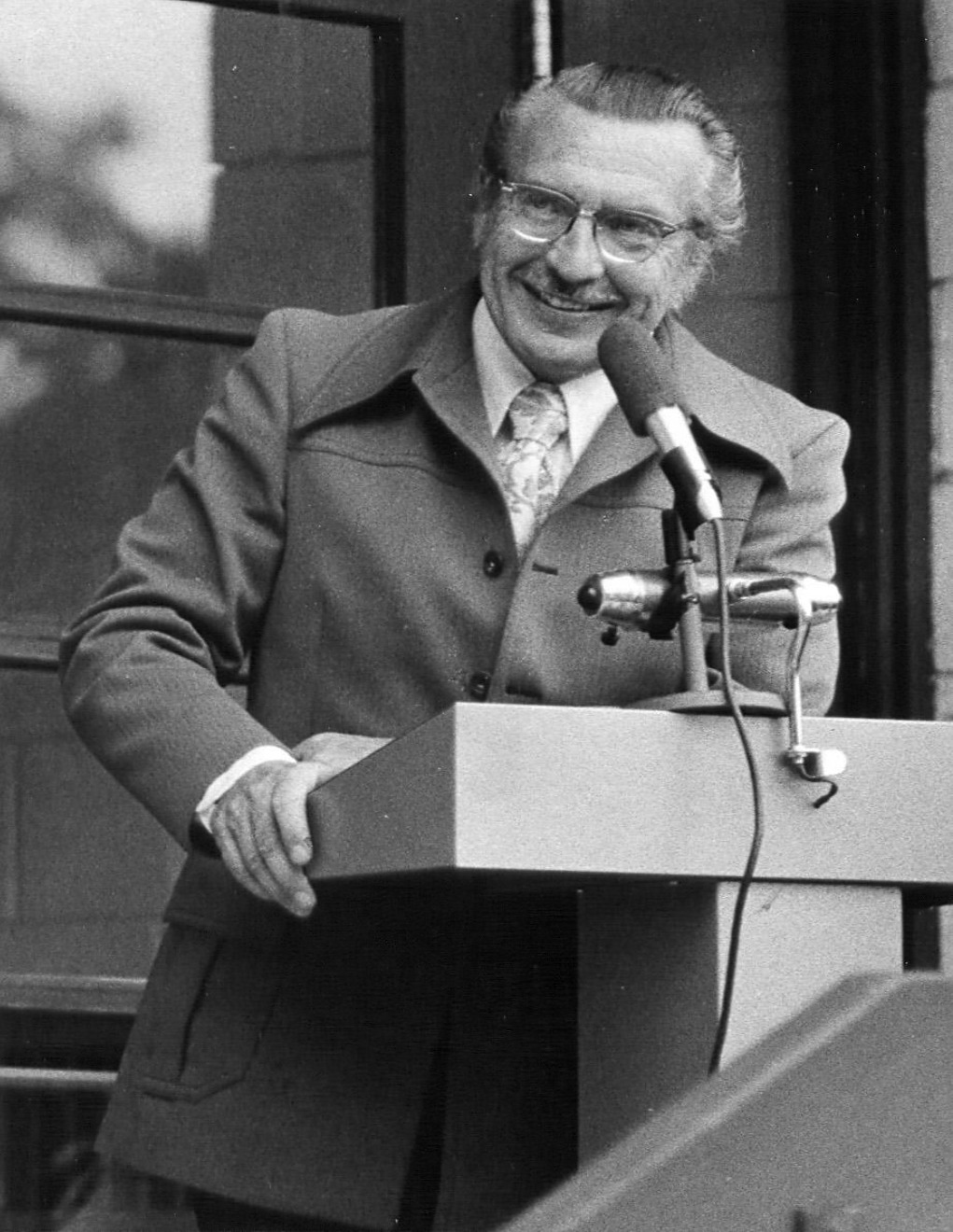
David Murray Gates

David M. Gates (May 27, 1921 – March 4, 2016) was an American ecologist who sounded early warnings that fossil fuels, fertilizers and pesticides posed a potentially fatal threat to the global environment. He published over fifty research papers and six books. His most influential book, "Energy Exchange in the Biosphere," is often called the Rosetta Stone for biologists studying plant-environment heat exchange.

He was the son of eminent botanist, Frank Caleb Gates and Margaret Murray Gates. David M. Gates began his career as an ecologist and academic at the University of Denver in 1947, where he was an associate professor working on radiation properties of the atmosphere and climate. This was key for his later work involving plant and animal interactions with their environment. While an academic, Gates also worked with General Motors as a “consulting ecologist” to discuss the company’s environmental impact. Additionally, he aided in the formation of the Clean Air Act of 1970. He was also one of the first people to speak out on greenhouse gasses warming the global climate. D

In 1964, Gates began to teach natural history at the University of Colorado. Here, Gates met mechanical engineer Dr. Frank Kreith. Together, they researched interactions on heat and mass transfer principles. Their work bridged biology and engineering, creating a new field known as biophysical ecology. Their later work together regarding "Radiation and Convection in Conifers" begged further questions involving plant-environment heat exchange, inspiring Gates to write one of his aforementioned most famous books, "Energy Exchange in the Biosphere."

After teaching and researching at a variety of institutions, he landed at the University of Michigan as a professor of botany and to direct the University of Michigan Biological Station in 1971. Here, he exercised his excellent fundraising abilities to support the Biological Station. He also educated many future generations about environmental field research, ecosystems, and sustainability in natural systems.

Gates was a physicist and ecologist, professor emeritus of biology, University of Michigan. He received his B.S., M.S., and Ph.D. degrees in physics from the University of Michigan.
