= Ray Barrett (footballer) =

Australian rules footballer (1935–2016)

Personal information
- Full name: Raymond John Barrett
- Born: 24 January 1935
- Died: 25 March 2016 (aged 81)
- Original team: Stratford
- Height: 196 cm (6 ft 5 in)
- Weight: 86 kg (190 lb)
- Position: Ruck

Playing career^{1}
Years	Club	Games (Goals)
1956, 1958	St Kilda	10 (5)
- ^{1} Playing statistics correct to the end of 1958.

Ray Barrett (born 24 January 1935 – 25 March 2016) was an Australian rules footballer who played with St Kilda in the Victorian Football League (VFL).
