= Erik Duval =

Professor (1965–2016)

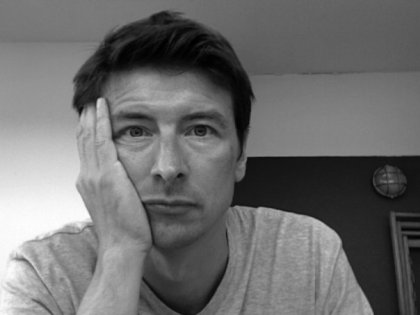
- Born: 11 September 1965; Schoten Belgium
- Died: 12 March 2016 (aged 50); Leuven, Belgium
- Known for: IEEE LOM, ARIADNE
- Scientific career
- Fields: Augmenting Human Intellect
- Institutions: Katholieke Universiteit Leuven
- Website: erikduval.wordpress.com; www.slideshare.net/erik.duval

Erik Duval (11 September 1965 – 12 March 2016) was a Belgian computer scientist. Duval chaired the informatics section of the computer science department of the Katholieke Universiteit Leuven, where he also chaired the research unit on human-computer interaction. His research tried to augment the human intellect.

== Life and career ==
Duval served on the executive committee of the Society for Learning Analytics Research (SoLAR), as a fellow of the AACE, as a member of ACM, and the IEEE computer society, on the Editorial Review Board and the Executive Advisory Board of the International Journal on E-Learning, as an associate editor of the IEEE Transactions on Learning Technologies (TLT), on the board of editors of the Journal of Universal Computer Science, and as a member of the informatics section of the Academia Europaea.

Duval co-founded and contributed to Aristo Music Technology (2000) and Atmire (2006).

In the last stages of his research career, Duval and his team were focused on:

- Capturing user actions for analysis of the user experience (with sensors like brainwave, ECG, eyetracking, … but also software sensors that track what people do)
- Personal information visualisation, where we try to help users with awareness, reflection, sensemaking, and behaviour change.

Typical application areas for this research included

- technology enhanced learning and learning analytics,
- science2.0 and digital humanities,
- personal health,
- data journalism.

== Selected academic works ==
Duval published over 100 papers. A selection of the highly cited ones:

- 2002, Metadata Principles and Practicalities
- 2002, IEEE Standard for learning object metadata
- 2002, Reusable learning objects: a survey of LOM-based repositories
- 2001, The Ariadne knowledge pool system
- 2003, A LOM Research Agenda
- 2007, Social Software for Lifelong learning
- 2005, Automating metadata generation: the simple indexing interface
- 2007, Tracking actual usage: the attention metadata approach
- 2011, Attention please!: learning analytics for visualization and recommendation

== Death ==
In March 2014, Duval was diagnosed with Non-Hodgkin Lymphoma. After chemotherapy and a stem cell transplant, a PET scan mid-January 2015 did not show any more traces of the disease. In the summer of 2015, a new diagnose revealed T-cell lymphoblastic lymphoma. Duval died on March 12, 2016.

== Legacy ==
To honor the memory of Erik Duval, the Society for Learning Analytics Research created Erik Duval Student Scholarships to provide support for students attending Learning Analytics Summer Institute.

The main auditorium in the Computer Science building of the KU Leuven was named after him, a few months after his death.
