= Martha Ehlin =

Swedish teacher (1977–2016)

Martha Elisabeth Ehlin (29 August 1977 – 19 March 2016) was a Swedish sports teacher and founder of the organisation MOD – Mer organdonation. At the age of thirty she got a cancer diagnosis and was saved by an organ transplant in which she received five new organs. After this incident, Ehlin founded MOD – Mer organdonation together with Peter Carstedt. At the World Transplant Games 2011, an athletic competition for people with transplants, she won five gold medals when the competitions were held in Gothenburg.

She became known to the Swedish audience when she hosted an episode of Sommar i P1 at Sveriges Radio on 17 July 2013. She was awarded the Årets kämpe (Fighter of the year) at the Svenska hjältar (Swedish heroes) gala which was broadcast on TV4 on 20 December 2013.

She died of cancer on 19 March 2016.
