= Norma Rubovits =

American paper artist (1918–2016)

- Born: Norma Bloch; August 26, 1918; Tulsa, Oklahoma
- Died: March 16, 2016; Chicago, Illinois
- Known for: Paper craft

Norma Rubovits (1918 – March 16, 2016) was an American paper marbler, bookbinder, and collector.

== Early life and education ==
Rubovits née Bloch was born in 1918 in Tulsa, Oklahoma. She attended the University of Oklahoma. At the age of 21, she relocated to Chicago to work as a dietician at University of Chicago Hospitals. She married Dr. Frank Rubovits and the couple studied bookbinding techniques, including a class taught by Elizabeth Kner.

== Career ==
Rubovits turned her attention to paper marbling, learning the process by contacting other paper marblers and studying books about the craft in the Newberry Library. Her style evolved into producing spare images that she referred to as vignettes. As well a creating marbled paper, Rubovits amassed a collection of over 4,000 examples of marbled paper from around the world. She donated her collection to the Newberry Library in the early 1990s. In 2010 the Newberry held a retrospective of her work.

Rubovits died at the age of 97 on March 16, 2016, in Chicago.

== Featured works ==
Her work was included in the 2023 exhibition Pattern and Flow: A Golden Age of American Decorated Papers, 1960s-2000s at the Grolier Club, and in the Paper Legacy Project at the Thomas J. Watson Library at the Metropolitan Museum of Art.
