= Dick Rahoi =

American ski jumper

Richard A. Rahoi (November 30, 1934 – March 24, 2016) was an American ski jumper who competed in the 1956 Winter Olympics. He was born in Iron Mountain, Michigan.
