= Enriquito López =

Dominican politician

Enrique "Enriquito" López (died 4 March 2016) was a Dominican Republic politician. He served in the Senate of the Dominican Republic between 2000 and 2004 for Monseñor Nouel Province. He was member of the Dominican Revolutionary Party (PRD). Before his time in the Senate he had served in the Chamber of Deputies of the Dominican Republic in the 1990s. López was the PRD candidate for senator of Monseñor Nouel Province in 2010, but was not elected.

López died in a clinic in Santo Domingo on 4 March 2016, aged 60, he had been suffering from diabetes. López was married and had two children.
