= Jun Shiraoka =

Japanese photographer

Jun Shiraoka (白岡 順, Shiraoka Jun; 1944 – 17 March 2016) was a Japanese photographer. Internationally exhibited photographer Shiraoka pursued his singular photographic vision largely outside his native Japan, working abroad for almost three decades.

== Biography ==
Shiraoka became fascinated with the art of photography as a college physics instructor in Yokohama. He attended classes at the Tokyo Sogo Institute of photography. He then embarked on a year-long journey of discovery with his camera, from 1972 to 1973, visiting Russia, Scandinavia, Europe and Morocco, mostly by train.

From 1973 to 1979 he resided in New York City, where in addition to perfecting his English at the American Language Program of Columbia University, he took photography classes at The New School and International Center of Photography (ICP). Lisette Model was enthusiastic about his work, and encouraged him in his approach to the medium. In New York, early collectors of his work are Paul Walter and Sam Wagstaff, whose Book of Photographs (1978) includes Shiraoka's The Wave.

From 1979 to early 2000 the photographer lived and worked in Paris, France, where his black and white gelatin silver prints were championed by the Chief Curator of Photography of the Bibliothèque Nationale, Jean-Claude Lemagny, who designated him "the greatest photographer of our times." Shiraoka participated in numerous solo and group shows in galleries and museums across Europe and in Japan. His photographs are featured in a monograph by Jean-Louis Schefer on novelist Kenzaburō Ōe, (Paris:Marval, 1990).

Shiraoka returned to Japan in the spring of 2000, and served as photography instructor at Tokyo Zokei University of Art for about a decade. He is the founder of the Calotype Studio in Japan. He died of complications of liver cancer shortly before reaching his 72nd birthday in 2016.

Regarding the elusive, poetic quality of his photographs, Shiraoka commented in an interview early in his career, "I want to capture on film the feeling which I feel ...when a light breeze blows on the beach at the end of Summer. " And, "Ambiguity, uncertainty, clearness. Look, only look. To see, to see oneself, to be seen, what does it mean?"

== Selected museum collections ==
- J. Paul Getty Museum, Chrysler Museum, Bibliothèque Nationale, The Strasbourg Museum of Modern and Contemporary Art, Kawasaki Museum, Tokyo Metropolitan Museum of Photography.
