= Neil Gunn (sailor) =

Canadian sailor

Neil Gunn (8 October 1945 – 30 March 2016) was a Canadian sailor who competed in the 1972 Summer Olympics. He was born in Toronto.
