= John Jones (water polo) =

British water polo player

Personal information
- Born: 17 April 1925; Cheltenham, Gloucestershire, England
- Died: 8 March 2016 (aged 90)

Sport
- Sport: Water polo

John Jones (17 April 1925 – 8 March 2016) was a British water polo player. He competed at the 1948 Summer Olympics then captained the 1952 Summer Olympics and the 1956 Summer Olympics teams.
