= Beatrice Gillam =

British naturalist

Beatrice Gillam MBE
- Born: 25 January 1920
- Died: 1 March 2016 (aged 96); Devizes, Wiltshire, UK
- Education: University of London

Beatrice Gillam MBE (25 January 1920 – 1 March 2016) was an English naturalist, ecologist and conservation advocate. She was awarded an MBE in the 1983 New Year Honours for her work in wildlife conservation; reporting on the award, the Gazette & Herald described her as 'Wiltshire's foremost naturalist'

== Early life and education ==
Gillam was born in Carlisle, Cumbria, to Major William A. Gillam and Beatrice Christian (née Pullar), the middle of three sisters and was baptised in Carlisle Cathedral. During the 1920s and 1930s, the family lived in Down Hatherleigh near Cheltenham, Burnham-on-Sea and Littleham Cross near Exmouth. In Burnham, Gillam was educated by a governess; she and her older sister, Anne, then briefly attended Oakover School. When the family moved to Littleham Cross, the girls attended Southlands School in Exmouth, where Gillam played on the netball and hockey teams and captained the lacrosse team. She also performed in school plays and was a member of the Girl Guides. She and Anne would cycle to Woodbury Common to look for butterflies and birds' nests. In 1941, Gillam graduated from Bedford Froebel College of Education with a 1st Class Teacher's Certificate.

Gillam returned to education in the 1950s, taking evening classes in natural history through the Bristol University Extra-Mural Department. In 1963, she attended Bristol University, studying zoology and botany, before joining the London University Extra-Mural Department. In 1966, she was awarded a Certificate of Proficiency in Natural History.

== Career and advocacy ==
Gillam began her career as a teacher of natural history and physical education at the Hall School in Somerset for four years before becoming an occupational therapist in the female wards of Fishponds, Bristol Mental Hospital between 1946 and 1950, during which time she lived in Bristol. She moved to Wiltshire in 1950 when she began to work in Devizes. She continued to work as an occupational therapist, first at St James's Hospital, Devizes, then part-time at Greathouse Leonard Cheshire Home near Chippenham and finally peripatetically for Wiltshire Council, until 1973, excluding the year she attended Bristol University. She also worked with Meals on Wheels for around twenty years between the 1960s and 1980s.

In 1962, Gillam was a founding member of the Wiltshire Trust for Nature Conservation, now the Wiltshire Wildlife Trust, becoming its co-ordinator in 1979. In 1974, she was involved in the establishment of the Wiltshire Ornithological Society, whose magazine, Hobby, she edited between 1975 and 1980, and she also founded the Wiltshire branch of Butterfly Conservation. She was a founder member of the Wiltshire Natural History Forum. Additionally, she was a regional representative for the British Trust for Ornithology and the Wiltshire county representative for The Mammal Society. From 1968 until the early 1990s, she was a voluntary warden for the Nature Conservancy Council (now Natural England). Furthermore, she was involved in a number of other conservation groups in Wiltshire, including the Cotwold Water Park Committee, the Forestry Commission, Friends of Oakfrith Wood, Westbury Naturalists Society, the Wildfowl and Wetlands Trust, the Wiltshire Archaeological and Natural History Society and the Wiltshire Farming and Wildlife Advisory Group

For more than fifty years over the course of her career, she contributed to numerous ecological surveys and censuses for the Wiltshire Ornithological Society, the British Trust for Ornithology and Butterfly Conservation., in particular a detailed study of the butterflies of Roundway Hill in Devizes, where she monitored the butterfly population from 1981. She edited the Annual Reports of the Wiltshire Trust for Nature Conservation during the 1960s and a series of articles on butterflies for the Gazette & Herald in the 1970s

She was a campaigner for the Salisbury Plain Training Area Conservation Groups (Imber and Larkhill & Westdown), making a significant contribution to the drafting of the Site Dossier, an important document for ecology management on the site. She wrote an article for the Ministry of Defence's conservation magazine raising awareness for Chirocephalus diaphanus fairy shrimp, which live in the puddles formed in army tank tracks on the Plain.

== Personal life ==
According to those close to her, Gillam was known for being thorough in her record-keeping and particular in her habits, always taking a nap in the afternoon, at least since the 1960s, sometimes for several hours. When she was awarded her MBE in 1983, she was unable to attend the Investiture due to back problems and instead received the award at the Post Office in Devizes. She enjoyed illustration, woodworking and, in her later years, tapestry.

Although she never married and had no children of her own, Gillam inspired multiple people who knew her in their youth to become involved with conservation, naturalism and ecology. One friend recounts that she paid for his accommodation throughout his geography studies at university and contributed financially to his final year field trip to Colombia.

In 2013, Gillam moved into a care home in Devizes, having lost much of her mobility. Her friends set up bird feeders outside her window so that she could continue to enjoy the wildlife from inside.

== Death ==
Gillam died in Devizes, Wiltshire, on 1 March 2016. After her death, her notes and journals were deposited by her family at the Wiltshire and Swindon History Centre, Chippenham. Gillam had wished for her body to be donated to science, but there were no vacancies at any of the teaching hospitals at the time of her death, so she was cremated instead. A memorial stone to Gillam was erected at Morgan's Hill Wiltshire Wildlife Trust reserve near Devizes.

== Published works ==
- The Wiltshire Flora (Editor), Pisces Publications, 1993
- The Butterflies of Wiltshire (Editor), Michael Fuller, Pisces Publications, 1995
- The Birds of Wiltshire (Contributor), Wiltshire Ornithological Society, 1981 and 2007
- 'The Status of the Lesser Spotted Woodpecker (Dendrocopus minor) in Wiltshire 1957-64', Wiltshire Archaeological and Natural History Magazine, Volume 60, 1965
- 'The Distribution of Badgers in Wiltshire 1966', Wiltshire Archaeological and Natural History Magazine, Volume 62, 1967
