= Frederick Moore (Lancashire cricketer) =

English cricketer

Frederick Moore (17 January 1931 – 17 March 2016) was an English cricketer from Rochdale. He played 24 first-class matches for Lancashire between 1954 and 1958. Moore also played for Lowerhouse Cricket Club in the Lancashire League in the 1959 season.
