= Don Walsh (footballer) =

Australian rules footballer

- Walsh during his Collingwood career

Personal information
- Full name: Don Walsh
- Born: 25 August 1934
- Died: 2 March 2016 (aged 81)
- Original team: Union
- Height: 175 cm (5 ft 9 in)
- Weight: 75 kg (165 lb)

Playing career^{1}
Years	Club	Games (Goals)
1954–1955	Collingwood	6 (0)
- ^{1} Playing statistics correct to the end of 1955.

Don Walsh (25 August 1934 – 2 March 2016) was an Australian rules footballer who played for the Collingwood Football Club in the Victorian Football League (VFL).
