= Donald Stoltenberg =

American painter

The artist in his studio

Donald Hugo "Don" Stoltenberg (October 15, 1927 – March 26, 2016) was an American painter specializing in marine subjects.

== Education and early career ==
Stoltenberg attended public grade school in Chicago, and High School in Grand Rapids, Michigan. He was awarded a B.S. degree in Visual Design Art from the Institute of Design of the Illinois Institute of Technology in 1953. Upon graduation, he took a position as graphic designer working under illustrator and industrial designer Raymond Loewy. Following a relocation to Boston in 1954, he worked as a graphic designer at Container Corporation of America.

In 1960, he set up an art studio on Commercial Wharf, a former fishing pier on the Boston waterfront where he became a full-time painter. This location would inspire his lifelong dedication to marine art, with a focus on both sailing and steam-powered coastal and ocean vessels, most notably the classic ocean liners of the 20th century. For the next decade he focused on honing his abstract expressionist style.

== Art career ==
From 1957 to 1974, he taught collography at the DeCordova Museum School in Lincoln, Massachusetts, specializing in oil painting, watercolor, and printmaking technique. He simultaneously taught printmaking at the Castle Hill Center in Truro, Massachusetts and the Falmouth Artists Guild on Cape Cod. He also taught printmaking and drawing at the Cape Cod Conservatory of Music and Art. In 1962, he was named visiting critic for the Rhode Island School of Design.

In 1975, he authored two educational texts, Collagraph Printmaking and The Artist and the Built Environment. During this period he also tutored art students privately at his 1860 Cape Cod summer home. He moved there permanently in 1967.

== Exhibitions ==
Stoltenberg's work has been included in major exhibitions of contemporary art throughout the United States, most notably at the New York Metropolitan Museum of Art, the Art Institute of Chicago, the Museum of Fine Arts in Boston, the Boston Institute of Contemporary Art, the Boston Athenaeum, the Corcoran Gallery of Art in Washington, D.C., the DeCordova Museum in Lincoln, Massachusetts, the Copley Society of Boston, the Fogg Museum at Harvard University, and the Worcester Museum. Stoltenberg has also had a number of solo exhibitions.

== Awards and honors ==
Stoltenberg has received many awards for his work, including the Grand Prize from the Boston Art Festival; the First Purchase Prize of the Portland (Maine) Museum; the Worcester Art Museum Printmaking Prize; the Boston Printmakers Award; the New England Watercolor Society First Prize; the American Watercolor Society Lena Newcastle and Mario Cooper Awards; and the Boston National Historical Park Purchase Award.

His works are included in the permanent collections of Boston's Museum of Fine Arts, the Boston Public Library, the Addison Gallery of American Art, the Portland (Maine) Museum of Art, the DeCordova Museum, the Art Complex at Duxbury, the Episcopal Theological School of Harvard University, the MIT Sloan School of Management, and a number of corporations and private collections.

Stoltenberg's art has illustrated a number of books on ocean liners and served as the basis for the 2004 corporate holiday card for the Cunard Line, celebrating the 2004 tandem sailing of their QE2 ocean liner with Cunard's newest ocean liner, Queen Mary 2, from New York to Southampton in April 2004.

== Personal life ==
Stoltenberg was partnered for more than 60 years to Kenneth (Laxson) Swallow who produced art glass regionally on Cape Cod.
