= Tina St. Claire =

American musician and artist (1984–2016)

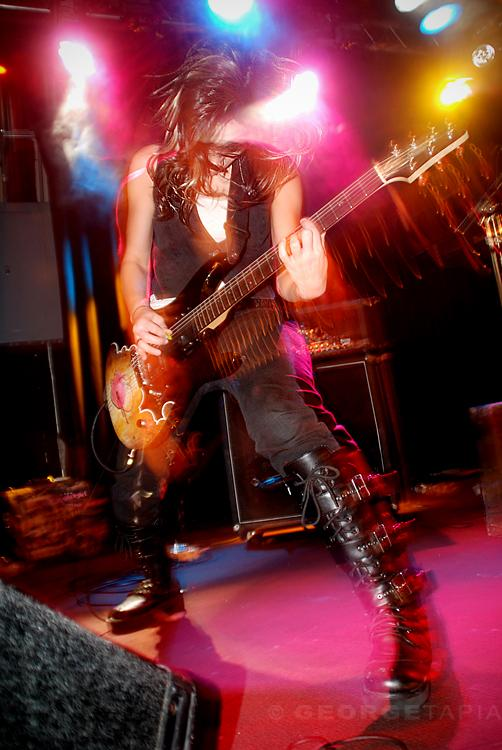
- Born: May 28, 1984
- Died: March 9, 2016 (aged 31)
- Other names: T.S. Claire; TFail
- Occupations: Musician and artist
- Years active: 2003–2016
- Known for: Street art

Tina St. Claire (May 28, 1984 – March 9, 2016), also known as T.S. Claire and TFail, was an American musician and artist who was known for her street art works.

== Biography ==
Tina St. Claire was a self-taught artist whose work could be found throughout the city of Los Angeles, sometimes on abandoned structures or alongside graffiti. St. Claire displayed her work in over 100 gallery spaces throughout the U.S. She was featured in Juxtapoz in 2012.

St. Claire's art often complimented her partner, fiancé, and frequent collaborator, Dereck Seltzer. She had a background in wheat pasting and mural-style street art. Most of her pieces surround the female form or face, and contained crystals, skulls, and pupil-less eyes.

St. Claire was primarily an illustrator, though she also worked with clients, studios, companies, and organizations. Her work tends to be multi-disciplinary in her style and technique. She created thousands of pieces of art in her lifetime that varied from full paintings, sketches in journals, silk screen print editions, numerous legal and illegal street installations, stickers, tapestries, zines, clothing, and various types of other fine art.

On December 25, 2015, St. Claire was diagnosed with Glioblastoma Multiforme grade 4, a type of brain cancer. She died of it on March 9, 2016 in Los Angeles.

== Music ==
In July 2003, she cofounded the hardcore metal band Lia-Fail (sometimes stylised as LiaFail or Lia-FaiL). The initial lineup was St. Claire, Mikaela Mayer, Nita Strauss, and Kirsten Schlüter. With Strauss and Mayer leaving the band, Henry James (aka Heather D. Welborn) and Dinelle joined the band as vocalist and bassist respectively. The band toured the US a few times and played a number of clubs, events, and festivals including Warped Tour multiple times in the United States before disbanding in 2008. It was through this band that she adopted the name TFAIL.

== Artwork ==
=== TMRWLND ===
TMRWLND (pronounced "Tomorrow Land") is a hardcover book that also exists as a compendium of all three issues of the zine by the same name, made by St. Claire and Seltzer. Established in 2013, TMRWLND morphed from a zine project into a full-time creative studio entity and working space. The zine project and book highlighted the two artists’ individual talents and individual styles of art and art-making. The artists used techniques such as inking, drawing, silkscreen printing, and hand painting, for the illustrations.

The artwork of the TMRWLND zines and book showcases the different relationship between St. Claire's and Dereck Seltzer's styles. As of 2024, the project remains active, and since 2016 it has had a few exhibitions in the US.

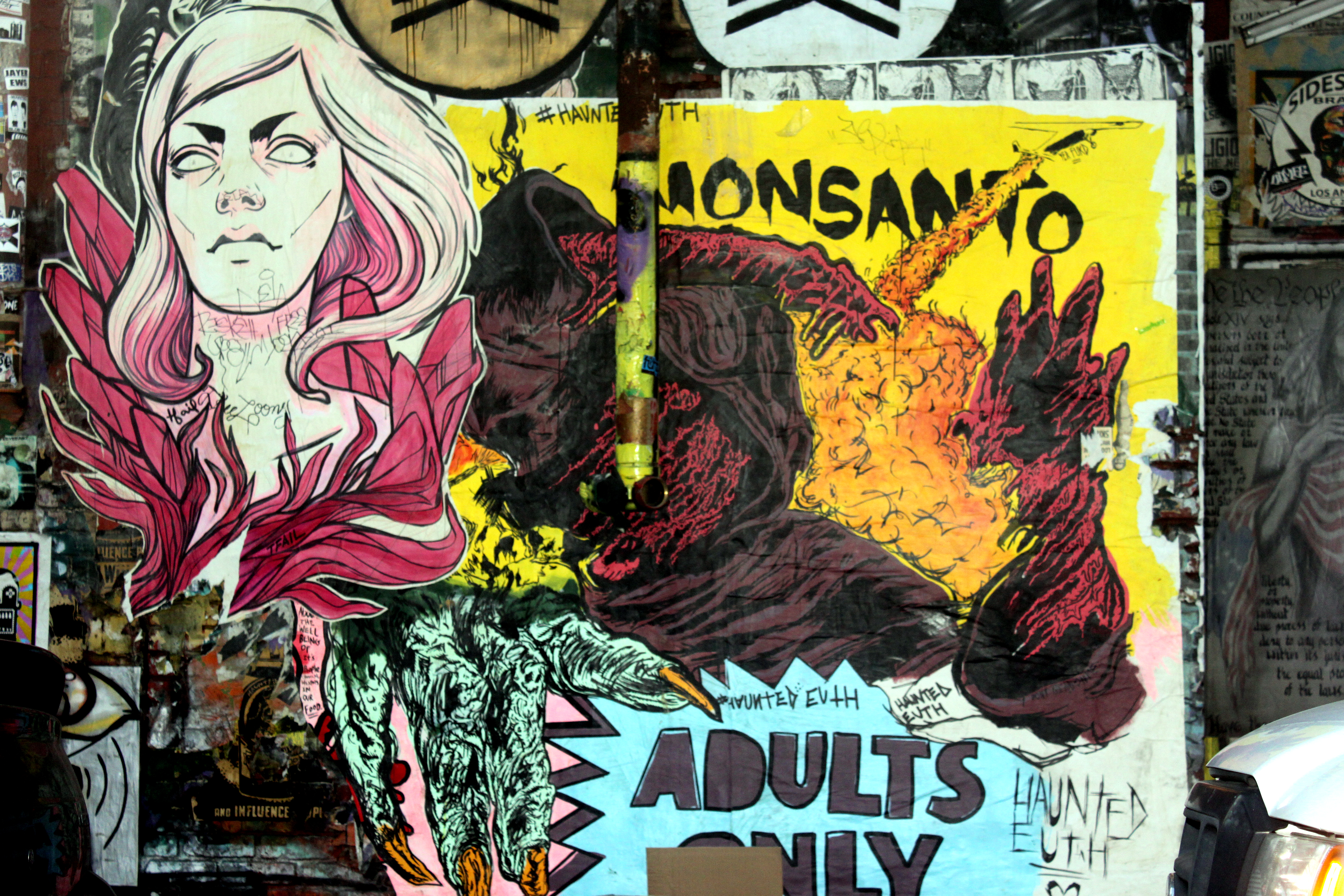
Portrait of a woman by Tina St. Clair, image from 2014

=== Street art ===
St. Claire created many large scale hand painted pieces that she installed around the city of Los Angeles. She did wheat pasting, graphic design, silk screening, acrylic, spray and enamel painting in her work on the street. Most of her pieces surround the female form or face, and images of crystals, skulls, and pupil-less eyes.

=== Fine art ===
St. Claire also produced more formal paintings, drawings, and mixed media. Tina's work often featured a “feminine” color scheme and contained images of female skulls, symbolism, cats, crystals, and other personally significant imagery to Tina. The subjects in most of her paintings and drawings were life forms of some kind, whether animals, animal skulls or women, and they nearly always had empty eyes. Her fiancé, Dereck Seltzer, curated a memorial exhibit of her last series of work called “Eternal” in April 2016, at the Surf Club Gallery in Hollywood, presented by The Artillerist.

=== Collaboration with Dereck Seltzer ===
Tina St. Claire and Dereck Seltzer (Haunted Euth) met in October 2011. They began dating and working together creatively shortly after. The two partnered on murals, installations, pop-up shows and the now internationally published book TMRLWND, despite having very little to almost no backing or support from the contemporary Los Angeles art scene. Over the next five years, their installations and murals could be seen in the Downtown L.A. Arts District, Culver City Arts District and along Sunset Boulevard most frequently. Seltzer proposed to Tina St. Claire shortly before her hospitalization for cancer treatment in 2016. He stayed with her while she resided in the hospital and attempted to raise money to support her medical bills through a Gofundme Campaign. After Tina's passing, Dereck has attempted to raise funds to create a documentary, called the Tina St. Claire Heroine Documentary, about Tina and her art. As of 2024, the campaign is closed.

== Charity ==
St. Claire painted a large mural for Temple Magnet School (LAUSD) for which she received a letter of recognition from the school board and Los Angeles. She also painted numerous skateboard decks for charity, which were auctioned off to help the Venice Family Clinic in Los Angeles.
