= Jerry Bridges =

American author (1928–2016)

Jerry Bridges (December 4, 1929 – March 6, 2016) was an evangelical Christian author, speaker and staff member of The Navigators, a Christian organization. Born in Tyler, Texas, United States, he was the author of a large number of books, including The Pursuit of Holiness, which has sold more than one million copies. His devotional Holiness Day by Day garnered the 2009 ECPA Christian Book Award for the inspiration and gift category, and The Discipline of Grace received a similar award in 1995 for the Christian living category.

Bridges earned his undergraduate degree in engineering at the University of Oklahoma, before serving as an officer in the United States Navy during the Korean War. He joined Christian discipleship organization The Navigators in 1955, where he served as administrative assistant to the Europe Director, office manager for the headquarters office, Secretary-Treasurer of the organization, and as vice president for Corporate Affairs before moving to a staff development position with the Collegiate Mission.

At the time of his death, he was a widower, and had married Jane Mallot a year after his first wife's death. Bridges died on March 6, 2016, in Colorado Springs, Colorado, at the age of 86.

== Publications ==
- The Pursuit of Holiness, NavPress (1978) ISBN 0-89109-430-X
- The Practice of Godliness, NavPress (1983) ISBN 0-89109-497-0
- Trusting God, NavPress, 1991, ISBN 0-89109-617-5.
- You Can Trust God, NavPress, 1991, ISBN 0-89109-571-3.
- The Crisis of Caring: Recovering the Meaning of True Fellowship, P & R, 1992, ISBN 0-87552-110-X.
- Transforming Grace, NavPress (1993) ISBN 0-89109-656-6
- The Joy of Fearing God, Random House (1999) ISBN 1-4000-7064-3
- I Exalt You, O God: Encountering His Greatness in Your Private Worship, Random House (2000) ISBN 1-57856-421-2
- I Give You Glory, O God, Random House (2002) ISBN 1-57856-629-0
- The Chase: Pursuing Holiness in Your Everyday Life, NavPress (2003) ISBN 1-57683-468-9
- The Gospel For Real Life, NavPress (2003) ISBN 1-57683-507-3
- Growing Your Faith: How to Mature in Christ, NavPress (2004) ISBN 1-57683-475-1
- Is God Really in Control? Trusting God in a World of Terrorism, Tsunamis, and Personal Tragedy, NavPress (2006) ISBN 1-57683-931-1
- The Discipline of Grace, NavPress (2006) ISBN 1-57683-989-3
- The Fruitful Life:The Overflow of God's Love Through You, NavPress (2006) ISBN 1-60006-027-7
- Respectable Sins: Confronting the Sins we Tolerate, NavPress, 2007a, ISBN 978-1-60006-140-0.
- The Great Exchange, Good News & Crossway, 2007b, ISBN 978-1-58134-927-6.
- The Bookends of the Christian Life, Crossway, 2009, ISBN 978-1-4335-0319-1.
- The Transforming Power of the Gospel, NavPress, 2012, ISBN 978-1-61747-922-9.
- Who Am I? - Identity in Christ, Cruciform Press, 2012, ISBN 978-1-936760-47-3.
