= Ilkka Ruohonen =

- Born: 15 September 1958; Helsinki
- Died: 17 March 2016 (aged 57); Helsinki
- Citizenship: Finnish
- Education: Helsinki University
- Scientific career
- Fields: Cultural anthropology, documentary films
- Thesis: Purjeet kohti Guineaa! Analyysi Portugalin löytöretkien kulttuurisesta aspektista (1993)

Ilkka Antero Ruohonen (15 September 1958 – 17 March 2016) was a Finnish cultural anthropologist and documentary film maker. He served for many years as teacher of cultural anthropology in Helsinki University.

Ruohonen studied anthropology and religious studies in the late 1970s and early 1980s in Helsinki University. He gained his MA in 1984 with a study of the Kun Iam Tong temple in Macau. He completed his PhD in 1993 with a dissertation on early Portuguese voyages of discovery. It was entitled Purjeet kohti Guineaa! Analyysi Portugalin löytöretkien kulttuurisesta aspektista ('Sails towards Guinea! An analysis of the cultural aspects of Portuguese voyages of discovery'). In it he studies the earliest phases of European colonialism. He based his study on Portuguese chronicles and archival materials. His study is said to have been an ambitious one. Later Ruohonen specialized in the early stages of colonialism in Portugal and Latin America, as well as on the anthropological study on Venezuela.

In addition to his career in science, Ruohonen was also a film maker, having made more than 20 of them. Among his best-known films are the following:

- The Carnival Laughter (2000)
- Platoninen vihan käsite ('The Platonic concept of hatred') (2001)
- Maximum Attack! The Anthropology of Speed (2005)
- My Urban Kalakukko (2006)
- Documentary Albert (2008)
- Shoplifting (2009)

Ruohonen's films were often screened at the Viscult Film Festival in Joensuu, Finland. The last of these took place in 2014, when Ruohonen showed his film Herra Mustarastas ('Mr. Blackbird'), which, however, was left incomplete at the time of his death.

In 2001 YLE in Finland showed Ruohonen's film The Platonic concept of hatred . It was seen by 200,000 viewers, although it was shown on a Friday during prime time and YLE at the same time showed the Nordic World Ski Championships.
