= Finland men's national basketball team =

Men's national basketball team representing Finland

Finland
- FIBA ranking: 16 ▲1 (1 September 2026)
- Joined FIBA: 1939
- FIBA zone: FIBA Europe
- National federation: Basketball Finland
- Coach: Lassi Tuovi
- Nickname(s): Susijengi (The Wolf Pack)

Olympic Games
- Appearances: 2
- Medals: None

FIBA World Cup
- Appearances: 2
- Medals: None

EuroBasket
- Appearances: 18
- Medals: None
Home	Away

First international
- France 76–11 Finland (Kaunas, Lithuania; 22 May 1939)

Biggest win
- Luxembourg 53–111 Finland (Luxembourg City; 16 September 2006)

Biggest defeat
- Lithuania 112–9 Finland (Kaunas, Lithuania; 27 May 1939)

The Finland men's national basketball team (Finnish: Suomen koripallomaajoukkue, Swedish: Finlands herrlandslag i basket) represents Finland in international basketball competition. The national team is governed by Basketball Finland.

Finland has played in 18 EuroBasket tournaments, with their best finish coming in fourth place as co-hosts at EuroBasket 2025. Finland has appeared at the Olympic Games twice, in 1952 as hosts, and 1964. Finland has also qualified for the FIBA World Cup twice, in 2014 and 2023.

Since 2011, Finland has had the highest FIBA World Ranking among Nordic countries.

== History ==
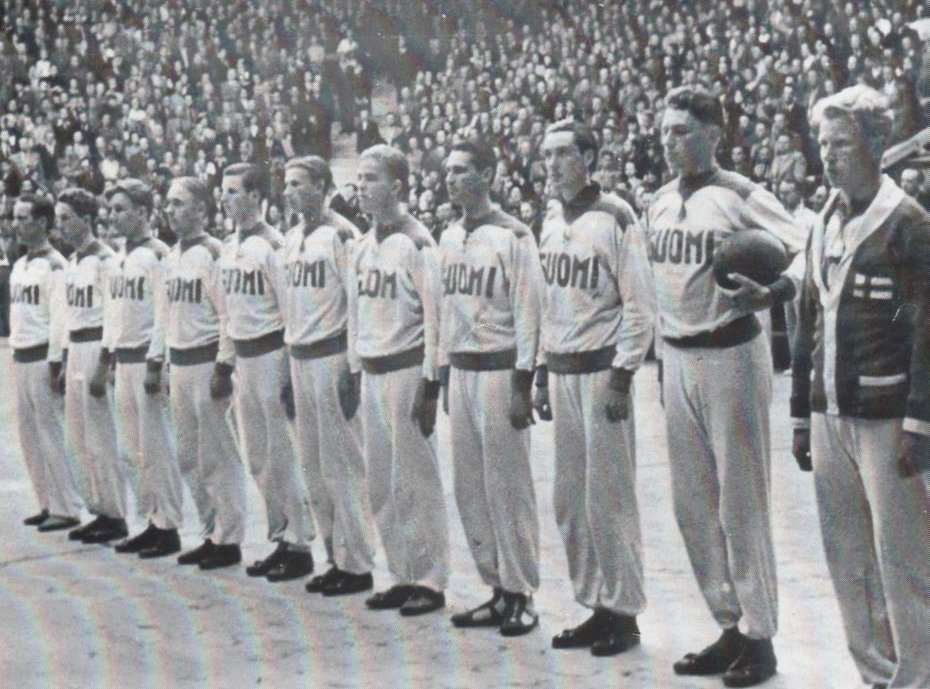
Finnish national team during the EuroBasket 1939 in Lithuania.

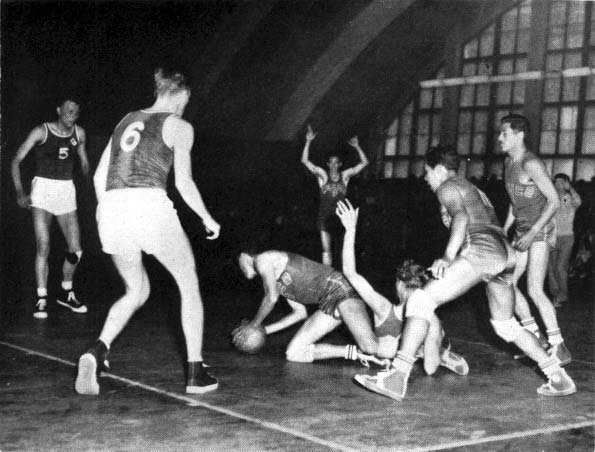
Finland playing against Mexico at the 1952 Helsinki Olympics.

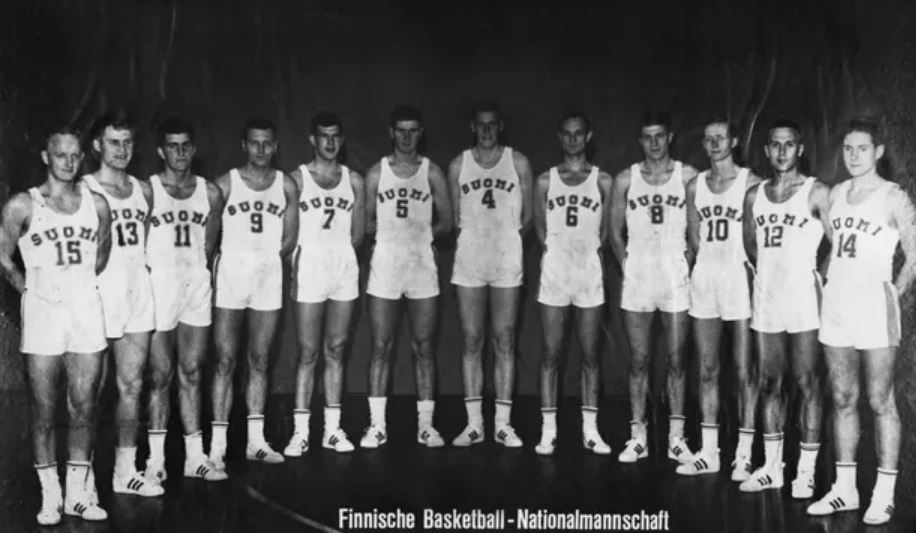
Finnish national basketball team in 1964 Tokyo Olympics.

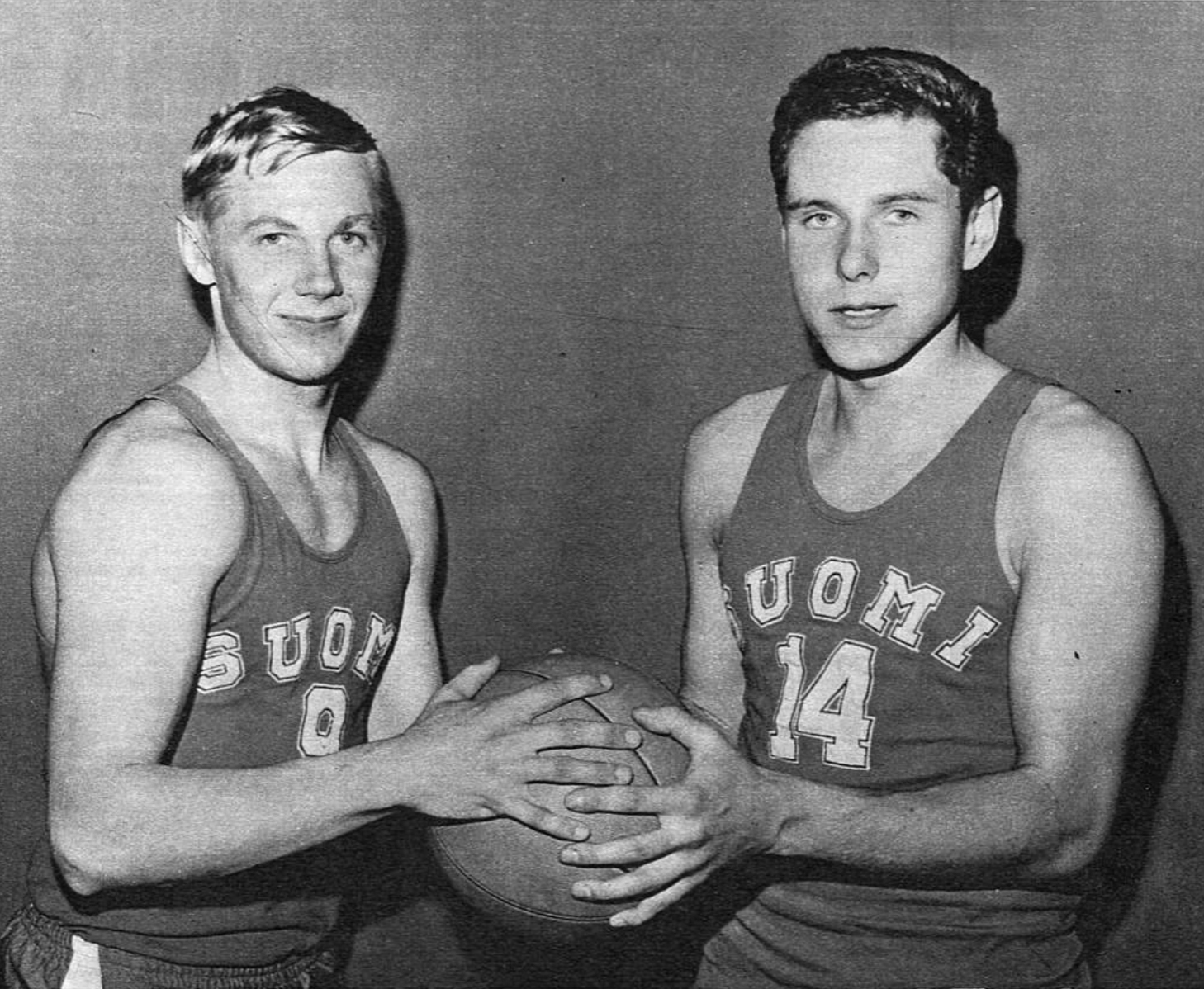
Jyrki Immonen (left) and national teammate Teijo Finneman in 1967.

=== Early years ===
The Finnish Basketball Association was founded in February 1939. A few months earlier the Finnish Football Federation had decided to add basketball to its own repertoire. Finland first competed at the European championship at its third installment, the EuroBasket 1939. In the round-robin, they initially struggled and lost to each of the other seven teams and finished with a 70–541 overall point differential.

=== 1950s ===
Finland's next European competition was 12 years later, at the EuroBasket 1951 in Paris. Overall, they fared much better and split their four preliminary round games and finished at third place in the group at 2–2 but were eliminated from championship contention. They had success after that, winning all three of their classification round 1 games and both round 2 games to finish in 9th place of the 18 teams.

In 1952, by virtue of hosting the games in Helsinki, Finland played at the Summer Olympics for the first time. The national team finished at the bottom of Group B in the preliminary round losing all of its game to the Soviet Union, Bulgaria and Mexico, and failing to advance.

Finland used this international experience when they competed again at the EuroBasket 1953 in Moscow. In the preliminary round, they finished with 1 win and 3 losses for 4th place of the 5 teams in the group. They fared significantly better in the first classification round, winning 3 and losing only 1 to finish in the middle of a three-way tie in the group. They lost both the 9–12 and 11/12 classification games, however, taking 12th place of 17 overall.

At the next event, Finland had some difficulty in the preliminary round of EuroBasket 1955. They lost all three early games in Budapest and were relegated to the classification round. Once again, not faced with the world elite opponents anymore, the Fins shone in the classification round and won all four of the pool play games. They won their classification 9–12 match as well, but lost to France in the 9/10 final to finish 10th of 18 in the tournament.

In Sofia, at the EuroBasket 1957, the Finns finished third in their preliminary group after going 1–2. They moved to the 9–16 classification pool and won five games there with only one loss. They took 11th place overall in the tournament.

=== Modern era ===
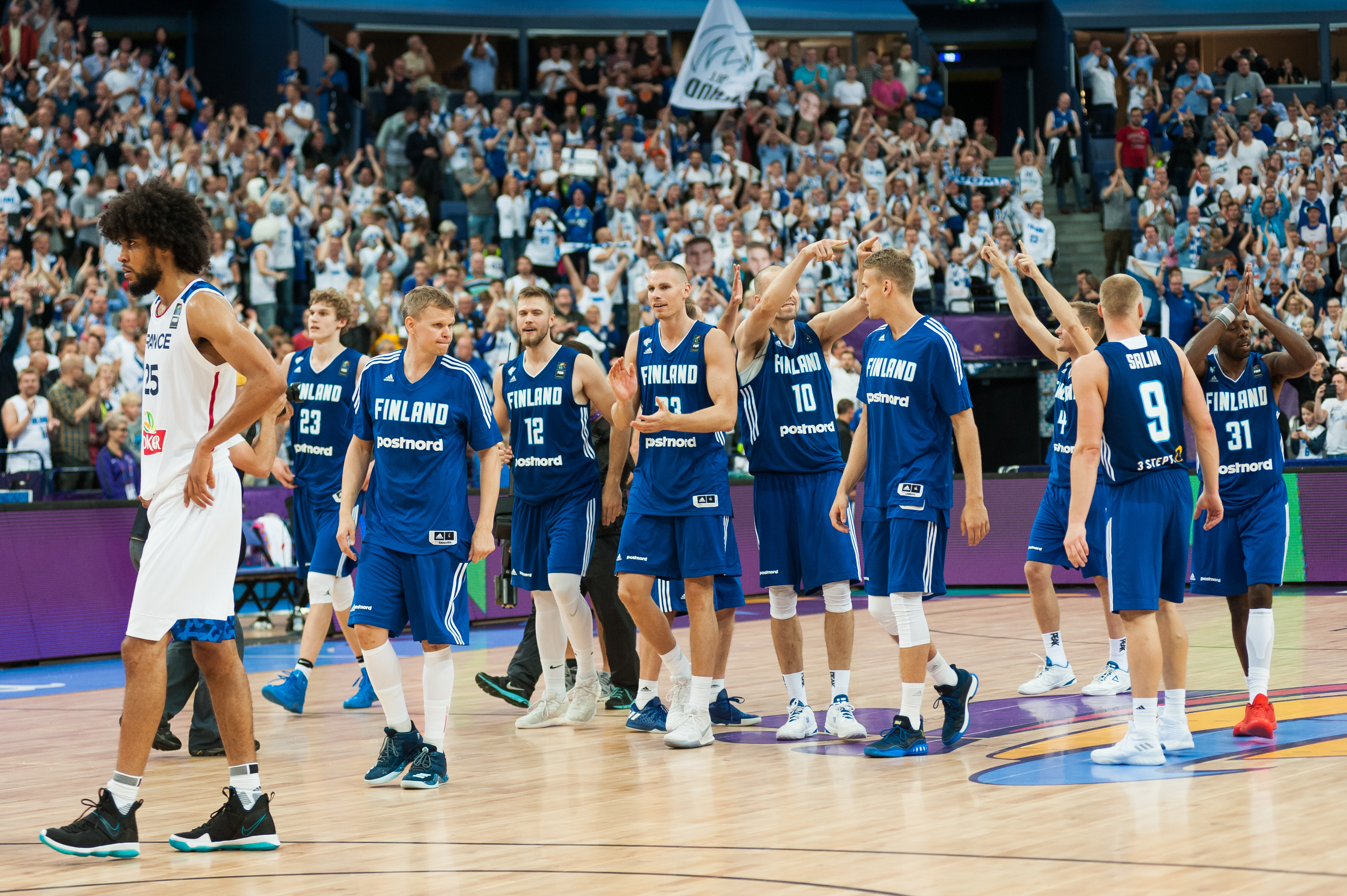
Finland after defeating France at EuroBasket 2017.

At the EuroBasket 1995 in Greece, was Finland's first qualification to the top European basketball tournament since 1977. The national team did not fair too well at the event though. As they were routed in their first match against Russia 126–74, and ultimately led to them finishing with an 0–6 record (13th place) and were eliminated.

Finland qualified for the EuroBasket 2011. The tournament berth was the first for Finland in 16 years. There they finished third out of six teams in EuroBasket 2011 Group C and defeated Bosnia and Herzegovina 92–64 and Montenegro 71–65. This allowed them to qualify for the EuroBasket 2011 Group F. In their first match they were easily defeated by Russia but afterwards they defeated Georgia, before losing to Slovenia in their final match of the tournament. Despite not making it to the best of 8 tournament, Finland ended up making it to their first ever FIBA World Cup as a wild card team alongside Greece, Turkey, and Brazil.

Finland was selected one of the co-hosts for the EuroBasket 2017. Tournament's Group A was played in Helsinki, at the venue then called Hartwall Arena. Finland finished second in the group with wins against France, Poland, Greece and Iceland, and advanced to the round of 16 where they were defeated by Italy. They ultimately finished 11th in the competition

After not qualifying for the 2019 FIBA World Cup, Finland performed well at the 2022 EuroBasket. They finished second in their group again, after Serbia. Led by Lauri Markkanen and his historical 43-point performance, they defeated Croatia in the round of 16. Eventually they were knocked out of the competition in the quarter-finals by Spain and finished 7th in the tournament. This was the nation's best finish since 1967, when they were sixth. The event was also a farewell for the captain Shawn Huff and long-served point guard Petteri Koponen as they both announced their retirement after the tournament.

Finland also qualified for the 2023 FIBA World Cup, as the first nation from Europe to make it through in the qualifiers. They lost their group stage games against Australia, Germany and Japan in Okinawa, but performed well in the classification games against Cape Verde and Venezuela, finishing the tournament with two wins in the 21st place.

In early July 2024, Finland competed at the 2024 FIBA Olympic qualifying tournament in Valencia, Spain. Without Markkanen, they unexpectedly made it through to the tournament's final round, but were knocked out of the competition by Spain again. Mikael Jantunen was named in the tournament's All-Star Five.

At the 2025 EuroBasket, Finland finished third out of six teams in Group B, which was played at home in Tampere. They defeated Serbia in the round of 16 game in Riga and advanced to the semi-finals for the first time in the country's EuroBasket history. The team finished ultimately 4th in the tournament, after being defeated by Greece 92–89 in the bronze medal game. Miikka Muurinen, the youngest player in the tournament, was awarded the inaugural EuroBasket Rising Star trophy after delivering multiple highlight reel dunks throughout the tournament. Lauri Markkanen was named in the All-Tournament Second Team. After the tournament, Hanno Möttölä left the coaching staff to join the Canada national team, and later it was announced that Joonas Iisalo would replace him.

== Competitive record ==
=== FIBA World Cup ===
World Cup					Qualification		
Year	Position	Pld	W	L	Pld	W	L
(Argentina) 1950	Did not qualify				5	2	3
(Brazil) 1954	Did not qualify				EuroBasket served as qualifiers		
(Chile) 1959	Did not qualify				EuroBasket served as qualifiers		
(Brazil) 1963	Did not qualify				EuroBasket served as qualifiers		
(Uruguay) 1967	Did not qualify				EuroBasket served as qualifiers		
(Socialist Federal Republic of Yugoslavia) 1970	Did not qualify				EuroBasket served as qualifiers		
(Puerto Rico) 1974	Did not qualify				EuroBasket served as qualifiers		
(Philippines) 1978	Did not qualify				EuroBasket served as qualifiers		
(Colombia) 1982	Did not qualify				EuroBasket served as qualifiers		
(Spain) 1986	Did not enter				Did not enter		
(Argentina) 1990	Did not qualify				EuroBasket served as qualifiers		
(Canada) 1994	Did not qualify				EuroBasket served as qualifiers		
(Greece) 1998	Did not qualify				EuroBasket served as qualifiers		
(United States) 2002	Did not qualify				EuroBasket served as qualifiers		
(Japan) 2006	Did not qualify				EuroBasket served as qualifiers		
(Turkey) 2010	Did not qualify				EuroBasket served as qualifiers		
(Spain) 2014	22nd	5	1	4	Wild card		
(China) 2019	Did not qualify				12	6	6
(Philippines) (Japan) (Indonesia) 2023	21st	5	2	3	12	9	3
(Qatar) 2027	To be determined				To be determined		
(France) 2031	To be determined				To be determined		
Total	2/19	10	3	7	29	17	12

=== Olympic Games ===
Olympic Games					Qualifying		
Year	Position	Pld	W	L	Pld	W	L
(Nazi Germany) 1936	No national representative						
(United Kingdom) 1948	Did not enter						
(Finland) 1952	9th	3	0	3			
(Australia) 1956	Did not qualify						
(Italy) 1960	Did not enter				Did not enter		
(Japan) 1964	11th	9	4	5	8	7	1
(Mexico) 1968	Did not qualify				9	4	5
(West Germany) 1972	Did not qualify				7	2	5
(Canada) 1976	Did not qualify				5	1	4
(Soviet Union) 1980	Did not qualify				4	1	3
(United States) 1984	Did not qualify				3	1	2
(South Korea) 1988	Did not qualify				4	2	2
(Spain) 1992	Did not enter				Did not enter		
(United States) 1996	Did not qualify				Did not qualify		
(Australia) 2000	Did not qualify				Did not qualify		
(Greece) 2004	Did not qualify				Did not qualify		
(China) 2008	Did not qualify				Did not qualify		
(United Kingdom) 2012	Did not qualify				Did not qualify		
(Brazil) 2016	Did not qualify				Did not qualify		
(Japan) 2020	Did not qualify				Did not qualify		
(France) 2024	Did not qualify				3	1	2
(United States) 2028	To be determined				To be determined		
Total	2/20	12	4	8	43	19	24

=== EuroBasket ===
EuroBasket					Qualification		
Year	Position	Pld	W	L	Pld	W	L
(Switzerland) 1935	No national representative						
(Latvia) 1937	No national representative						
(Lithuania) 1939	8th	7	0	7			
(Switzerland) 1946	Did not enter						
(Czechoslovakia) 1947	Did not enter						
(Egypt) 1949	Did not enter						
(France) 1951	9th	9	7	2			
(Soviet Union) 1953	12th	10	4	6			
(Hungary) 1955	10th	9	5	4			
(Bulgaria) 1957	11th	10	6	4			
(Turkey) 1959	13th	7	2	5			
(Socialist Federal Republic of Yugoslavia) 1961	14th	7	3	4			
(Poland) 1963	14th	9	2	7	Direct qualification		
(Soviet Union) 1965	12th	9	3	6	Direct qualification		
(Finland) 1967	6th	9	6	3	Qualified as host		
(Italy) 1969	Did not qualify				4	0	4
(West Germany) 1971	Did not qualify				4	1	3
(Spain) 1973	Did not qualify				7	2	5
(Socialist Federal Republic of Yugoslavia) 1975	Did not enter				Did not enter		
(Belgium) 1977	10th	7	1	6	5	3	2
(Italy) 1979	Did not qualify				10	3	7
(Czechoslovakia) 1981	Did not qualify				5	2	3
(France) 1983	Did not qualify				12	2	10
(West Germany) 1985	Did not qualify				12	4	8
(Greece) 1987	Did not qualify				12	3	9
(Socialist Federal Republic of Yugoslavia) 1989	Did not qualify				9	3	6
(Italy) 1991	Did not qualify				3	0	3
(Germany) 1993	Did not qualify				4	2	2
(Greece) 1995	14th	6	0	6	12	9	3
(Spain) 1997	Did not qualify				10	3	7
(France) 1999	Did not qualify				3	2	1
(Turkey) 2001	Did not qualify				16	10	6
(Sweden) 2003	Did not qualify				6	3	3
(Serbia and Montenegro) 2005	Division B				6	3	3
(Spain) 2007	Division B				10	8	2
(Poland) 2009	Did not qualify				12	5	7
(Lithuania) 2011	9th	8	3	5	12	5	7
(Slovenia) 2013	9th	8	5	3	8	6	2
(France) (Croatia) (Germany) (Latvia) 2015	16th	6	2	4	Direct qualification		
(Finland) (Israel) (Romania) (Turkey) 2017	11th	6	4	2	Qualified as co-host		
(Czech Republic) (Georgia (country)) (Italy) (Germany) 2022	7th	7	4	3	6	3	3
(Cyprus) (Finland) (Poland) (Latvia) 2025	4th	9	5	4	6	2	4
(Estonia) (Greece) (Slovenia) (Spain) 2029	To be determined				To be determined		
Total	18/40	143	62	81	194	84	110

=== Summer World University Games ===
Summer World University Games
Year	Position
(Thailand) 2007	11th
(Serbia) 2009	10th
(China) 2011	7th
(Russia) 2013	10th
(South Korea) 2015	14th
(China) 2017	7th
(Italy) 2019	9th
(China) 2021	5th
(Germany) 2025	7th

=== Participated in other competitions ===
- FIBA Stanković Continental Champions' Cup: (2018)
- Adecco Cup: (2015)
- Friendship Games: (1984)

== Results and fixtures ==
Win Loss

=== 2025 ===
28 November 2025 2027 FIBA World Cup qualifiers – 1st round	Hungary	89–82	Finland	Szombathely, Hungary
18:00 CET (UTC+1)	Scoring by quarter: 31–17, 29–22, 15–22, 14–21
	Pts: Perl 25; Rebs: Reuvers 6 Asts: Somogyi 6	Boxscore	Pts: Salin 16; Rebs: Muurinen 8 Asts: Jantunen, Salin 4	Arena: Arena Savaria; Attendance: 2,700; Referees: Martin Vulić (CRO), Yener Yılmaz (TUR), Ioannis Agrafiotis (GRE)

1 December 2025 2027 FIBA World Cup qualifiers – 1st round	Finland	83–76	France	Espoo, Finland
18:30 EET (UTC+2)	Scoring by quarter: 20–19, 17–26, 19–16, 27–15
	Pts: Maxhuni 22; Rebs: Jantunen 9 Asts: Jantunen 6	Boxscore	Pts: Strazel 11; Rebs: Gaudoux 7 Asts: Sene, Strazel 3	Arena: Espoo Metro Areena; Attendance: 6,683; Referees: Ademir Zurapović (BIH), Fernando Calatrava (ESP), Juozas Barkauskas (LTU)

=== 2026 ===
26 February 2026 2027 FIBA World Cup qualifiers – 1st round	Belgium	66–71	Finland	Charleroi, Belgium
20:30 CET (UTC+1)	Scoring by quarter: 24–12, 13–20, 19–16, 10–23
	Pts: Lecomte 20; Rebs: Bolavie 6 Asts: Lecomte 6	Boxscore	Pts: Nkamhoua 23; Rebs: Nkamhoua 12; Asts: Maxhuni 6	Arena: Dôme; Attendance: 3,000; Referees: Petar Pešić (SRB), Blaž Zupančič (SVN), Elvis Binders-Čoders (LAT)

1 March 2026 2027 FIBA World Cup qualifiers – 1st round	Finland	78–75	Belgium	Espoo, Finland
18:30 EET (UTC+2)	Scoring by quarter: 17–22, 17–15, 22–15, 22–23
	Pts: Nkamhoua 23; Rebs: Madsen 11; Asts: four players 2	Boxscore	Pts: Schwartz 19; Rebs: Bratanovic, N. De Ridder 6 Asts: Lecomte 7	Arena: Espoo Metro Areena; Attendance: 6,822; Referees: Wojciech Liszka (POL), Carsten Straube (GER), Ritvars Helmšteins (LAT)

3 July 2026 2027 FIBA World Cup qualifiers – 1st round	Finland	85–77	Hungary	Helsinki, Finland
18:30 EEST (UTC+3)	Scoring by quarter: 13–18, 35–25, 26–15, 11–19
	Pts: Markkanen 23; Rebs: Gustavson 6 Asts: Little, Salin 3	Boxscore	Pts: Golomán, Perl 18; Rebs: Valerio-Bodon 6 Asts: Somogyi 5	Arena: Veikkaus Arena; Attendance: 12,489; Referees: Andris Aunkrogers (LAT), Gintaras Mačiulis (LTU), Mehmet Şahin (TUR)

6 July 2026 2027 FIBA World Cup qualifiers – 1st round	France	98–69	Finland	Pau, France
20:30 CEST (UTC+2)	Scoring by quarter: 31–16, 18–14, 28–17, 21–22
	Pts: Okobo, Raynaud 16; Rebs: Hoard 8 Asts: Strazel 7	Boxscore	Pts: Jantunen, Markkanen 14; Rebs: Jantunen 5 Asts: Maxhuni 5	Arena: Palais des Sports de Pau; Attendance: 7,131; Referees: Luis Castillo (ESP), Martin Vulić (CRO), Ilias Kounellis (CYP)

21 August 2026 Friendly	Finland	93–78	Iceland	Espoo, Finland
20:00 EEST (UTC+3)	Scoring by quarter: 26–17, 18–15, 16–20, 33–26
	Pts: Markkanen 17; Rebs: O. Federiko 10; Asts: Maxhuni, Nkamhoua 4	Boxscore	Pts: Hlinason 13; Rebs: Þrastarson 10; Asts: Friðriksson 7	Arena: Espoo Metro Areena

27 August 2026 2027 FIBA World Cup qualifiers – 2nd round	Finland	81–86	Sweden	Helsinki, Finland
18:30 EEST (UTC+3)	Scoring by quarter: 20–23, 21–21, 20–20, 20–22
	Pts: Nkamhoua 19; Rebs: Jantunen 7 Asts: three players 3	Boxscore	Pts: Larsson 31; Rebs: Birgander, Klintman 10; Asts: Håkanson 7	Arena: Veikkaus Arena; Attendance: 12,401; Referees: Ademir Zurapović (BIH), Lorenzo Baldini (ITA), Ritvars Helmšteins (LAT)

30 August 2026 2027 FIBA World Cup qualifiers – 2nd round	Estonia	67–96	Finland	Tallinn, Estonia
19:00 EEST (UTC+3)	Scoring by quarter: 21–21, 14–17, 11–28, 21–30
	Pts: Kullamäe 15; Rebs: three players 5 Asts: Kullamäe 5	Boxscore	Pts: Markkanen 21; Rebs: Markkanen 10; Asts: Nkamhoua 4	Arena: Unibet Arena; Attendance: 7,068; Referees: Petar Pešić (SRB), Yener Yılmaz (TUR), Ioannis Agrafiotis (GRE)

27 November 2026 2027 FIBA World Cup qualifiers – 2nd round	Slovenia	vs.	Finland	Celje, Slovenia
20:00 CET (UTC+1)
		Boxscore		Arena: Zlatorog Arena

30 November 2026 2027 FIBA World Cup qualifiers – 2nd round	Finland	vs.	Estonia	Espoo, Finland
18:30 EET (UTC+2)
		Boxscore		Arena: Espoo Metro Areena

=== 2027 ===
25 February 2027 2027 FIBA World Cup qualifiers – 2nd round	Sweden	vs.	Finland	Sweden
--:-- CET (UTC+1)
		Boxscore

28 February 2027 2027 FIBA World Cup qualifiers – 2nd round	Finland	vs.	Slovenia	Finland
--:-- EET (UTC+2)
		Boxscore

== Team ==
=== Current roster ===
Roster for the 2027 FIBA World Cup Qualifiers matches on 27 and 30 August 2026 against Sweden and Estonia.

Finland men's national basketball team roster
Players
Coaches

Pos.	No.	Name	Age – Date of birth	Height	Club	Ctr.
PG	1	Miro Little	22 – 30 May 2004	1.93 m (6 ft 4 in)	UC Santa Barbara	(United States)
PF	8	Okku Federiko	21 – 30 September 2004	2.07 m (6 ft 9 in)	Northwestern Wildcats	(United States)
SG	9	Sasu Salin (C)	35 – 11 June 1991	1.91 m (6 ft 3 in)	Estudiantes	(Spain)
PF	13	Olivier Nkamhoua	26 – 2 May 2000	2.03 m (6 ft 8 in)	Barcelona	(Spain)
SG	14	Henri Kantonen	29 – 20 August 1997	1.98 m (6 ft 6 in)	Argeș Pitești	(Romania)
G/F	16	Perttu Blomgren	24 – 13 September 2001	1.95 m (6 ft 5 in)	Trefl Sopot	(Poland)
PF	18	Mikael Jantunen	26 – 20 April 2000	2.04 m (6 ft 8 in)	Real Madrid	(Spain)
SF	19	Elias Valtonen	27 – 11 June 1999	2.00 m (6 ft 7 in)	Valencia	(Spain)
C	20	Alexander Madsen	31 – 26 January 1995	2.08 m (6 ft 10 in)	Szolnoki Olajbányász	(Hungary)
PG	21	Edon Maxhuni	28 – 21 March 1998	1.88 m (6 ft 2 in)	BCM Gravelines	(France)
F/C	23	Lauri Markkanen	29 – 22 May 1997	2.13 m (7 ft 0 in)	Utah Jazz	(United States)
SF	25	Mustapha Amzil	24 – 12 September 2001	2.08 m (6 ft 10 in)	Denizli Basket	(Turkey)
PG	35	Ilari Seppälä	33 – 27 March 1993	1.88 m (6 ft 2 in)	Kecskeméti	(Hungary)

Head coach

- (Finland) Lassi Tuovi

Assistant coach(es)

- (Finland) Joonas Iisalo
- (Finland) Teemu Rannikko

Legend

- (C) Team captain
- Club – describes last
  club before the competition
- Age – describes age
  on 27 August 2026

=== Depth chart ===
Pos.	Starting 5	Bench 1	Bench 2
C	Lauri Markkanen	Olivier Nkamhoua	Alexander Madsen
PF	Mikael Jantunen	Miikka Muurinen
SF	Elias Valtonen	Andre Gustavson
SG	Sasu Salin	Jacob Grandison
PG	Edon Maxhuni	Miro Little	Ilari Seppälä

=== Notable players ===
Current notable players who have played for the national team:

Current notable players roster
Players
Coaches

Pos.	No.	Name	Age – Date of birth	Height	Club	Ctr.
C		Mikael Aalto	31 – 12 September 1994	2.08 m (6 ft 10 in)	Korihait	(Finland)
SG		Samu Adler	18 – 10 August 2007	1.98 m (6 ft 6 in)	Butler Bulldogs	(United States)
SF		Max Besselink	24 – 4 April 2002	2.02 m (6 ft 8 in)	Kataja	(Finland)
C		Daniel Dolenc	33 – 10 August 1993	2.05 m (6 ft 9 in)	HKK Široki	(Bosnia and Herzegovina)
G		Aaron Ekwere	19 – 30 December 2006	1.96 m (6 ft 5 in)	Drive Black Academy	(Finland)
C		Federiko Federiko	25 – 9 May 2001	2.11 m (6 ft 11 in)	Texas A&M Aggies	(United States)
SG		Jacob Grandison	28 – 2 April 1998	1.98 m (6 ft 6 in)	Boulazac	(France)
SG		Andre Gustavson	27 – 7 May 1999	1.96 m (6 ft 5 in)	Oostende	(Belgium)
SF		Shawn Hopkins	31 – 9 May 1995	1.95 m (6 ft 5 in)	Álftanes	(Iceland)
SG		Okko Järvi	30 – 12 January 1996	1.93 m (6 ft 4 in)	Kecskeméti	(Hungary)
PG		Severi Kaukiainen	28 – 11 May 1998	1.85 m (6 ft 1 in)	Kalev	(Estonia)
PG		Aatu Kivimäki	29 – 8 June 1997	1.86 m (6 ft 1 in)	Patrioti Levice	(Slovakia)
F		Alex Murphy	33 – 3 June 1993	2.06 m (6 ft 9 in)	Fuenlabrada	(Spain)
SF		Miikka Muurinen	19 – 4 March 2007	2.11 m (6 ft 11 in)	Arkansas Razorbacks	(United States)
SF		Topias Palmi	32 – 26 August 1994	1.96 m (6 ft 5 in)	Tampereen Pyrintö	(Finland)
C		Hannes Pöllä	28 – 9 March 1998	2.12 m (6 ft 11 in)	Kataja	(Finland)
F		Remu Raitanen	29 – 21 August 1997	2.06 m (6 ft 9 in)	KTP Basket	(Finland)
PF		Touko Tainamo	25 – 6 January 2001	2.06 m (6 ft 9 in)	Leiden	(Netherlands)
F		Thomas Tumba	25 – 15 April 2001	1.96 m (6 ft 5 in)	Rotterdam	(Netherlands)

Legend

- Club – describes current club
- Age – describes age
  on 27 August 2026

== Head coach position ==
- (Estonia) Alois Suurna – (1939)
- (Finland) Keijo Viianen – (1950)
- (Finland) Eino Ojanen – (1951–1952)
- (Finland) Matti Simola – (1952)
- (Finland) Eino Ojanen – (1953–1955)
- (Finland) Kalevi Tuominen – (1955–1969)
- (United States) / (Finland) Robert Petersen – (1969–1972)
- (Finland) Kauko Jämsén – (1972–1973)
- (United States) / (Finland) Robert Petersen – (1977)
- (Finland) Kari Liimo – (1982–1984)
- (Finland) Eero Saarinen – (1984–1991)
- (Finland) Henrik Dettmann – (1992–1997)
- (United States) Aaron McCarthy – (1997–2001)
- (Finland) Ari Tammivaara – (2001–2003)
- (Finland) Tomi Kaminen – (2005)
- (Finland) Pekka Salminen – (2008)
- (Finland) Henrik Dettmann – (2004–2022)
- (Finland) Lassi Tuovi – (2022–present)

== Past rosters ==
1939 EuroBasket: finished 8th among 8 teams

3 Martti Salminen, 4 Kalevi Ihalainen, 5 Ilkka Törrönen, 6 Erkki Saurala, 8 Pentti Vuollekoski, 9 Pauli Sarkkula, 10 Heinonen, 11 Erkki Lindén, 12 Vladi Marmo, 13 Reino Valtonen, 14 Alo Suurna (Coach: Alois Suurna)

1951 EuroBasket: finished 9th among 17 teams

3 Oiva Virtanen, 4 Raimo Lindholm, 5 Juhani Kyöstilä, 6 Timo Suviranta, 7 Pentti Laaksonen, 8 Raine Nuutinen, 9 Kalevi Sylander, 11 Arto Koivisto, 12 Pertti Mutru, 13 Kalevi Heinänen, 14 Kaj Gustafsson, 15 Olli Arppe, 16 Allan Pietarinen, 17 Tapio Pöyhönen (Coach: Eino Ojanen)

1952 Olympic Games: finished 15th among 23 teams

3 Juhani Kyöstilä, 4 Raine Nuutinen, 5 Raimo Lindholm, 6 Timo Suviranta, 7 Kalevi Heinänen, 8 Pentti Laaksonen, 9 Oiva Virtanen, 10 Esko Karhunen, 11 Eero Salonen, 12 Pertti Mutru, 13 Tapio Pöyhönen (Coach: Matti Simola)

1953 EuroBasket: finished 12th among 17 teams

3 Timo Lampen, 4 Raine Nuutinen, 5 Raimo Lindholm, 6 Timo Suviranta, 7 Keijo Hynninen, 8 Kalevi Heinänen, 9 Pentti Laaksonen, 10 Oiva Virtanen, 11 Eero Salonen, 12 Kaj Gustafsson, 13 Pertti Mutru, 14 Allan Pietarinen (Coach: Eino Ojanen)

1955 EuroBasket: finished 10th among 18 teams

3 Timo Lampén, 4 Raine Nuutinen, 5 Raimo Lindholm, 6 Timo Suviranta, 7 Kalevi Heinänen, 8 Oiva Virtanen, 9 Eero Salonen, 10 Kalevi Sylander, 11 Taisto Ravantti, 12 Seppo Kuusela, 13 Asko Jokinen, 14 Pertti Mutru, 15 Kalevi Tuominen (Coach: Eino Ojanen)

1957 EuroBasket: finished 11th among 16 teams

3 Timo Lampén, 4 Raine Nuutinen, 5 Raimo Lindholm, 6 Timo Suviranta, 7 Arvo Jantunen, 8 Paavo Suhonen, 9 Juhani Kala, 10 Seppo Kuusela, 11 Kalevi Sylander, 12 Eero Salonen, 13 Pertti Mutru, 14 Arto Koivisto (Coach: Kalevi Tuominen)

1959 EuroBasket: finished 13th among 17 teams

3 Matti Köli, 4 Timo Lampén, 5 Pentti Palkoaho, 6 Matti Nenonen, 7 Raine Nuutinen, 8 Raimo Lindholm, 9 Arvo Jantunen, 10 Kyösti Rousti, 11 Juhani Kala, 12 Seppo Kuusela, 13 Eero Salonen, 14 Raimo Vartia (Coach: Kalevi Tuominen)

1961 EuroBasket: finished 14th among 19 teams

4 Uolevi Manninen, 5 Kari Liimo, 6 Timo Lampén, 7 Pertti Laanti, 8 Lauri Nurma, 9 Martti Liimo, 10 Tony Bärlund, 11 Raimo Lindholm, 12 Rauno Ailus, 13 Arvo Jantunen, 14 Seppo Kuusela, 15 Raimo Vartia (Coach: Kalevi Tuominen)

1963 EuroBasket: finished 14th among 16 teams

4 Uolevi Manninen, 5 Kari Liimo, 6 Timo Lampén, 7 Pertti Laanti, 8 Martti Liimo, 9 Juha Harjula, 10 Antero Siljola, 11 Rauno Ailus, 12 Kauko Kauppinen, 13 Jorma Pilkevaara, 14 Seppo Kuusela, 15 Raimo Vartia (Coach: Kalevi Tuominen)

1964 Olympic Games: finished 11th among 16 teams

4 Uolevi Manninen, 5 Kari Liimo, 6 Timo Lampén, 7 Pertti Laanti, 8 Martti Liimo, 9 Raimo Lindholm, 10 Juha Harjula, 11 Risto Kala, 12 Kauko Kauppinen, 13 Jorma Pilkevaara, 14 Teijo Finneman, 15 Raimo Vartia (Coach: Kalevi Tuominen)

1965 EuroBasket: finished 12th among 16 teams

4 Uolevi Manninen, 5 Kari Liimo, 6 Timo Lampén, 7 Pertti Laanti, 8 Martti Liimo, 9 Kari Lahti, 10 Hannu Paananen, 11 Jorma Pilkevaara, 12 Kari Rönnholm, 13 Lars Karell, 14 Teijo Finneman, 15 Jyrki Immonen (Coach: Kalevi Tuominen)

1967 EuroBasket: finished 6th among 16 teams

4 Veikko Vainio, 5 Kari Liimo, 6 Uolevi Manninen, 7 Pertti Laanti, 8 Martti Liimo, 9 Kari Lahti, 10 Kari Rönnholm, 11 Lars Karell, 12 Jorma Pilkevaara, 13 Olavi Ahonen, 14 Teijo Finneman, 15 Jyrki Immonen (Coach: Kalevi Tuominen)

1977 EuroBasket: finished 10th among 12 teams

4 Kalevi Sarkalahti 5 Heikki Kasko, 6 Tapio Sten, 7 Heikki Taponen, 8 Antti Zitting, 9 Risto Lignell, 10 Raimo Mäntynen, 11 Anssi Rauramo, 12 Mikko Koskinen, 13 Klaus Mahlamäki, 14 Jarmo Laitinen, 15 Erkki Saaristo (Coach: Robert Petersen)

1995 EuroBasket: finished 13th among 14 teams

4 Martti Kuisma, 5 Hanno Möttölä, 6 Pekka Markkanen, 7 Sakari Pehkonen, 8 Jarkko Tuomala, 9 Markku Larkio, 10 Riku Marttinen, 11 Mika-Matti Tahvanainen, 12 Juha Luhtanen, 13 Jyri Lehtonen, 14 Kari-Pekka Klinga, 15 Petri-Mikael Niiranen (Coach: Henrik Dettmann)

2011 EuroBasket: finished 9th among 24 teams

4 Mikko Koivisto, 5 Antti Nikkilä, 6 Kimmo Muurinen, 7 Shawn Huff, 8 Gerald Lee, 9 Sasu Salin, 10 Tuukka Kotti, 11 Petteri Koponen,
12 Vesa Mäkäläinen, 13 Hanno Möttölä (C), 14 Petri Virtanen, 15 Teemu Rannikko (Coach: Henrik Dettmann)

2013 EuroBasket: finished 9th among 24 teams

4 Mikko Koivisto, 5 Antti Nikkilä, 6 Kimmo Muurinen, 7 Shawn Huff, 8 Gerald Lee, 9 Sasu Salin, 10 Tuukka Kotti, 11 Petteri Koponen,
12 Samuel Haanpää, 13 Hanno Möttölä (C), 14 Roope Ahonen, 15 Teemu Rannikko (Coach: Henrik Dettmann)

2014 FIBA World Cup: finished 22nd among 24 teams

4 Mikko Koivisto, 5 Erik Murphy, 6 Kimmo Muurinen, 7 Shawn Huff, 8 Gerald Lee, 9 Sasu Salin, 10 Tuukka Kotti, 11 Petteri Koponen,
12 Matti Nuutinen, 13 Hanno Möttölä (C), 14 Antero Lehto, 15 Teemu Rannikko (Coach: Henrik Dettmann)

2015 EuroBasket: finished 16th among 24 teams

4 Mikko Koivisto, 7 Shawn Huff (C), 8 Gerald Lee, 9 Sasu Salin, 10 Tuukka Kotti, 11 Petteri Koponen, 12 Matti Nuutinen,
21 Ville Kaunisto, 24 Joonas Cavén, 30 Roope Ahonen, 31 Jamar Wilson, 33 Erik Murphy (Coach: Henrik Dettmann)

2017 EuroBasket: finished 11th among 24 teams

4 Mikko Koivisto, 7 Shawn Huff (C), 8 Gerald Lee, 9 Sasu Salin, 10 Tuukka Kotti, 11 Petteri Koponen, 12 Matti Nuutinen,
15 Teemu Rannikko, 22 Carl Lindbom, 23 Lauri Markkanen, 31 Jamar Wilson, 33 Erik Murphy (Coach: Henrik Dettmann)

2022 EuroBasket: finished 7th among 24 teams

1 Miro Little, 7 Shawn Huff (C), 9 Sasu Salin, 11 Petteri Koponen, 14 Henri Kantonen, 18 Mikael Jantunen, 19 Elias Valtonen,
20 Alexander Madsen, 21 Edon Maxhuni, 23 Lauri Markkanen, 35 Ilari Seppälä, 41 Topias Palmi (Coach: Lassi Tuovi)

2023 FIBA World Cup: finished 21st among 32 teams

1 Miro Little, 5 Alex Murphy, 9 Sasu Salin (C), 13 Olivier Nkamhoua, 14 Henri Kantonen, 18 Mikael Jantunen, 19 Elias Valtonen,
20 Alexander Madsen, 21 Edon Maxhuni, 23 Lauri Markkanen, 34 Jacob Grandison, 35 Ilari Seppälä (Coach: Lassi Tuovi)

2025 EuroBasket: finished 4th among 24 teams

1 Miro Little, 9 Sasu Salin (C), 13 Olivier Nkamhoua, 18 Mikael Jantunen, 19 Elias Valtonen, 20 Alexander Madsen, 21 Edon Maxhuni,
23 Lauri Markkanen, 24 Miikka Muurinen, 30 Andre Gustavson, 34 Jacob Grandison, 35 Ilari Seppälä (Coach: Lassi Tuovi)

== Notable players ==
Gallery

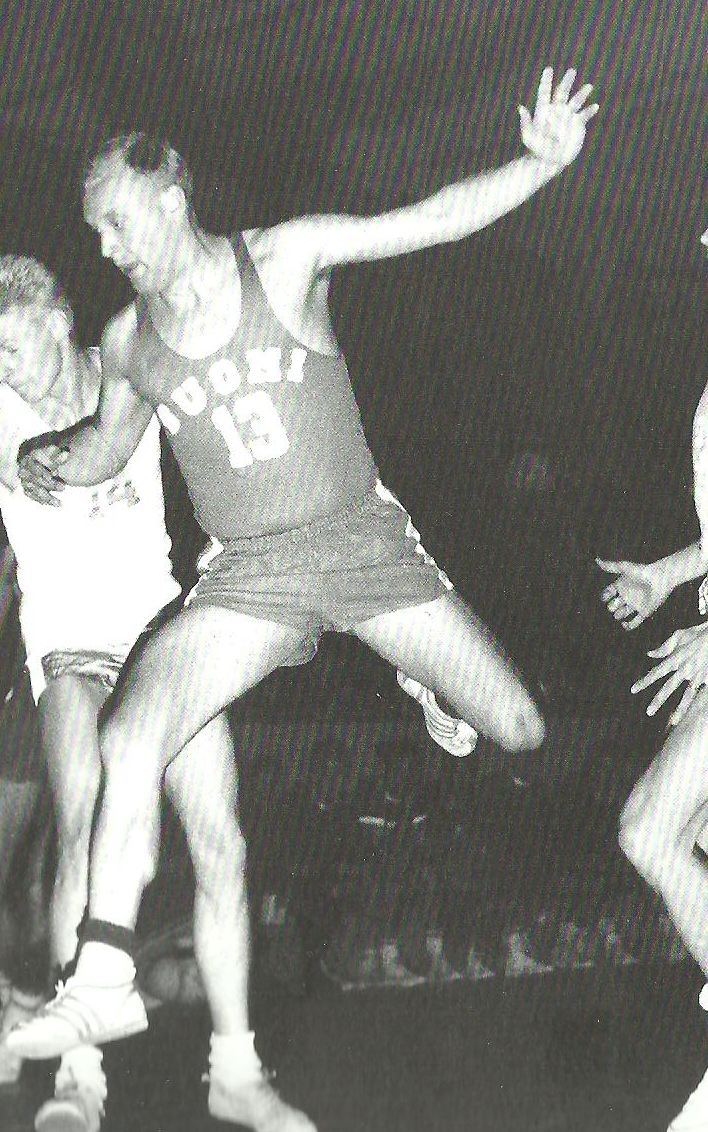
Seppo Kuusela

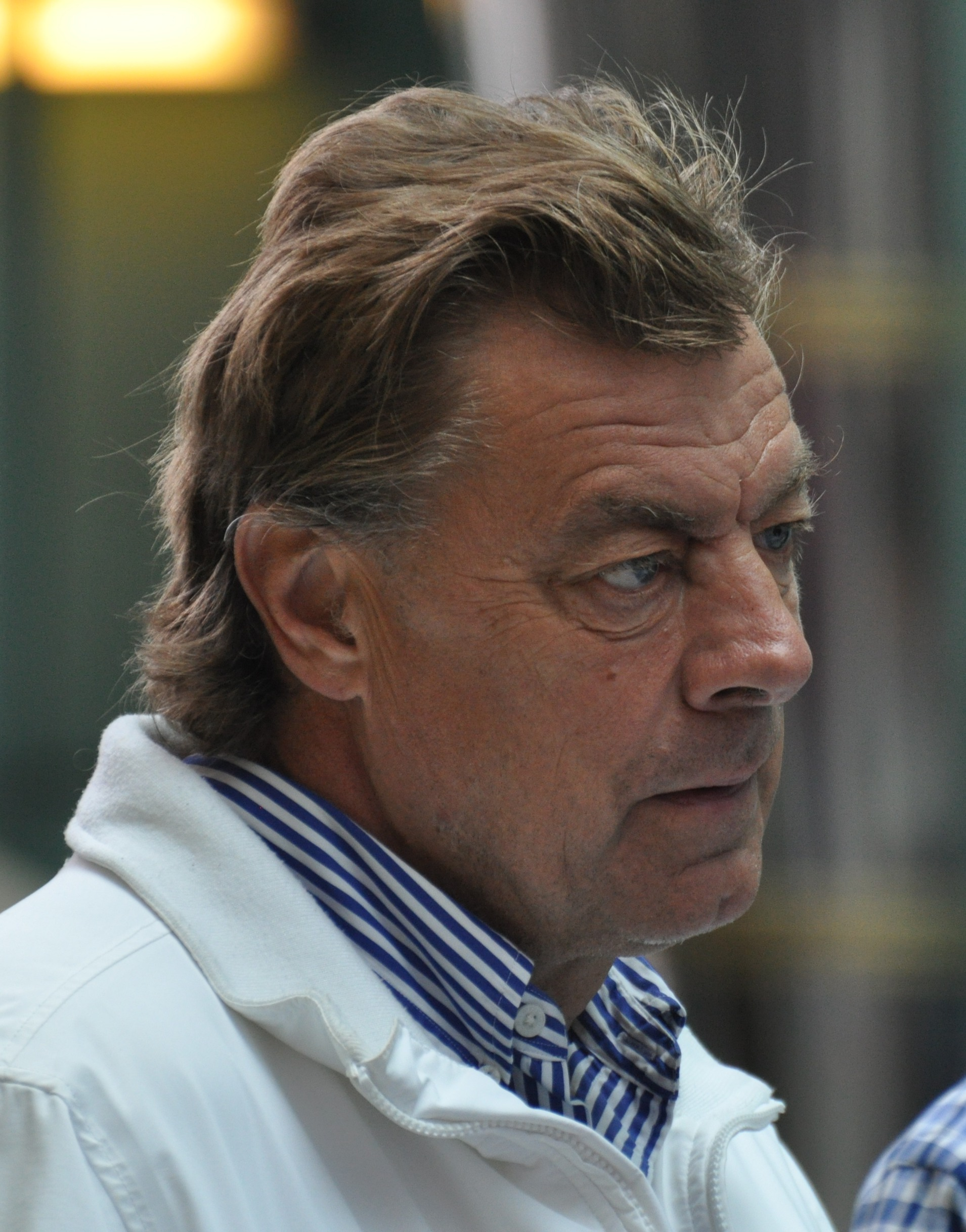
Anssi Rauramo

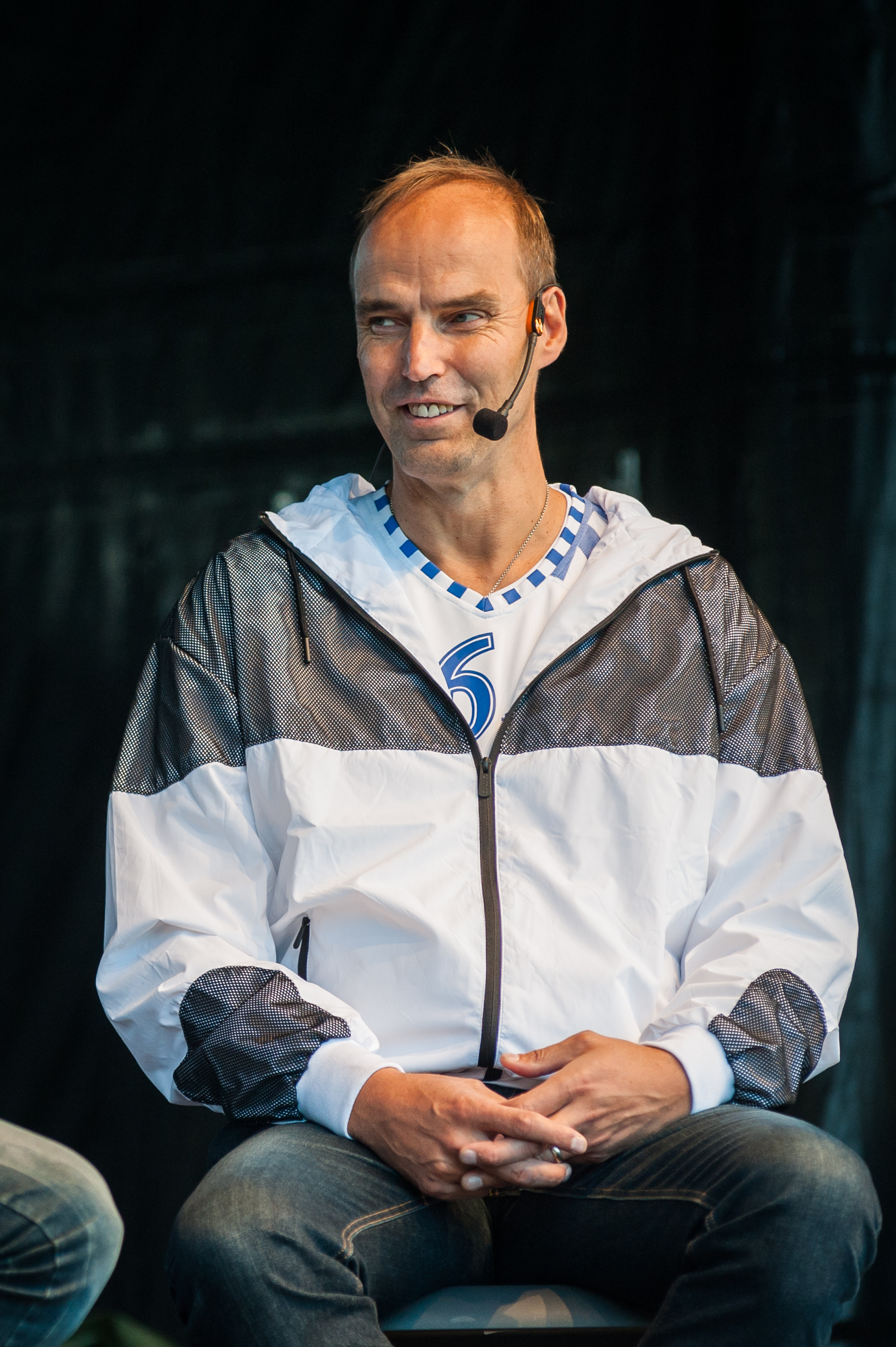
Pekka Markkanen

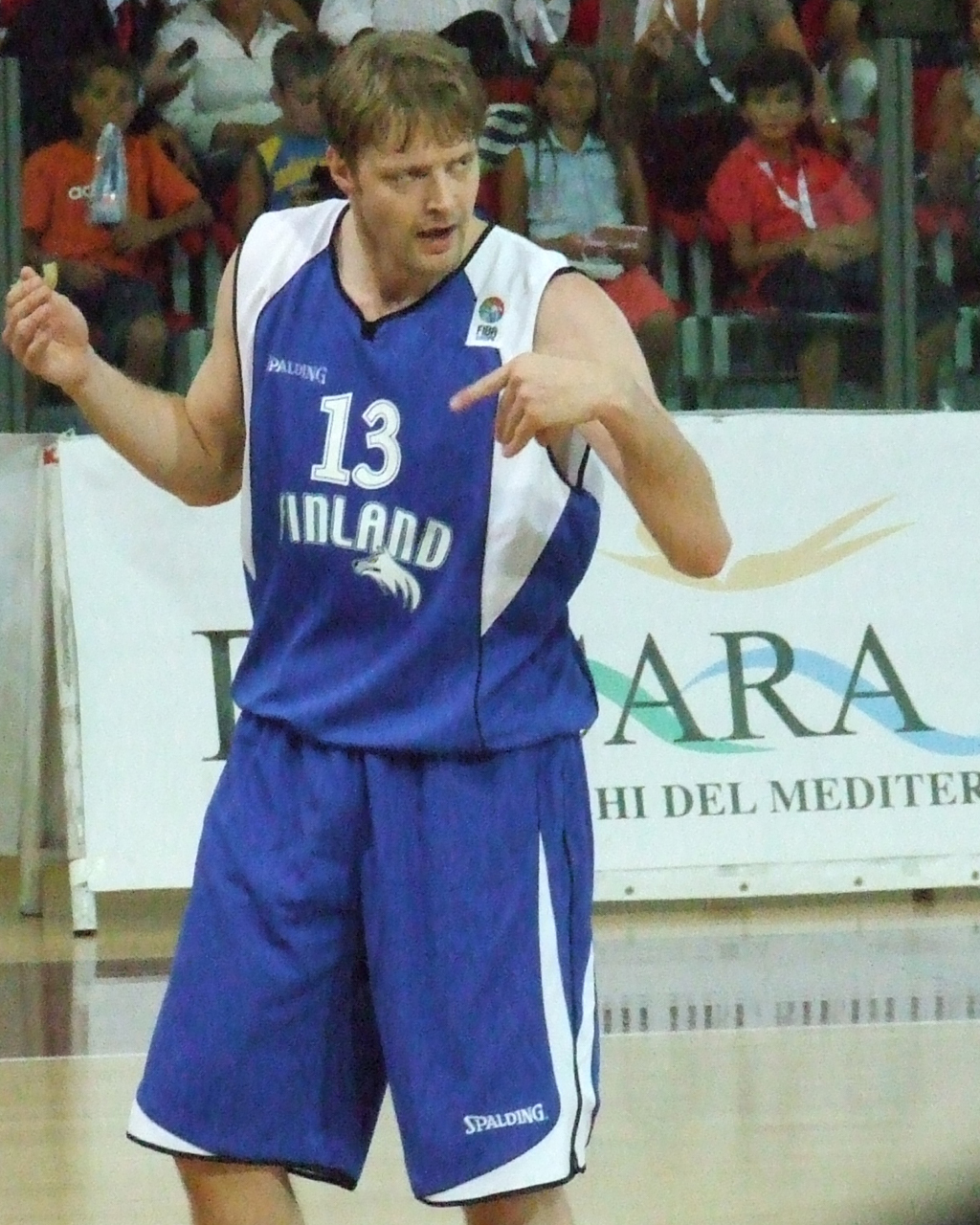
Hanno Möttölä

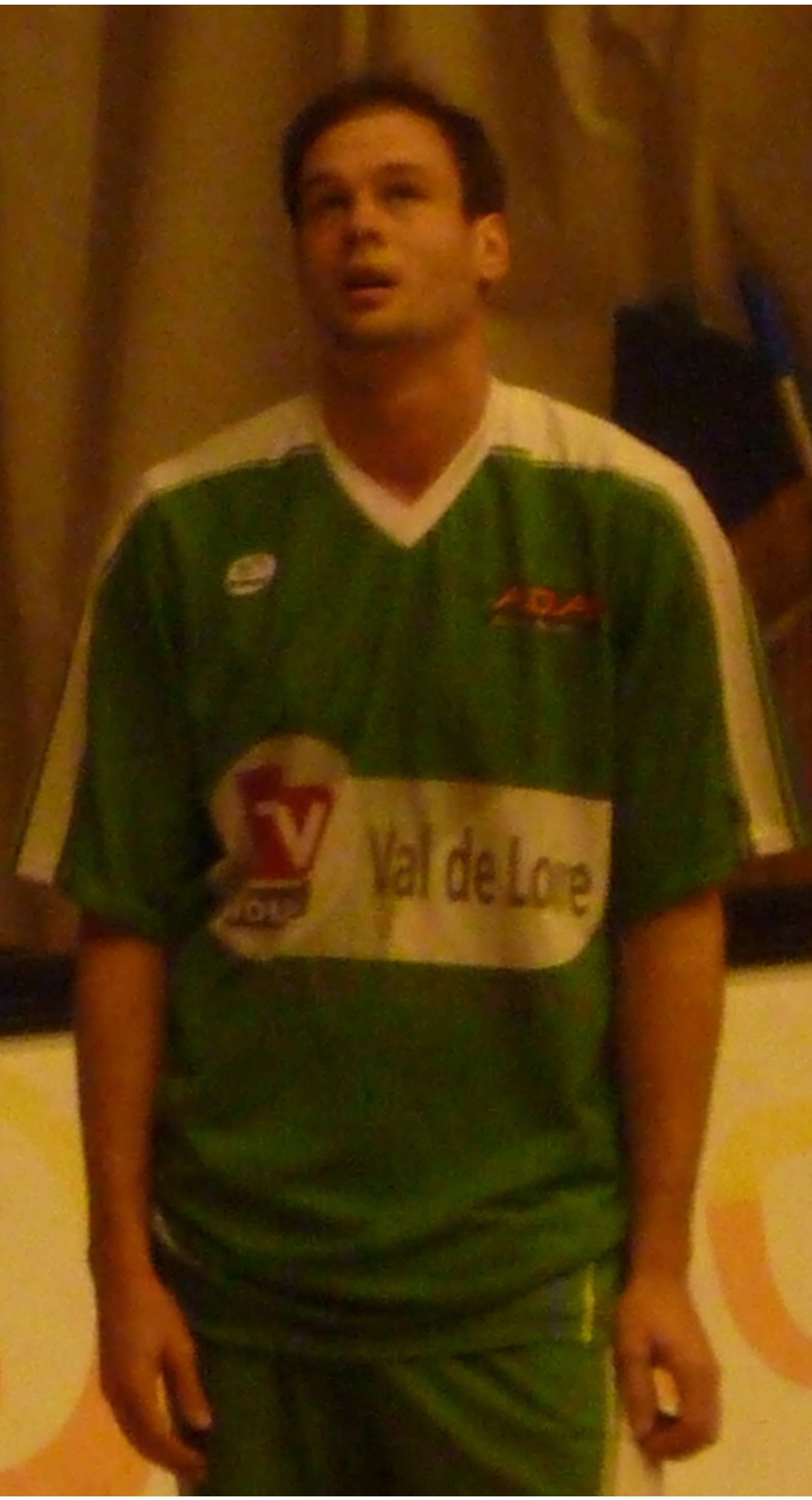
Ville Kaunisto

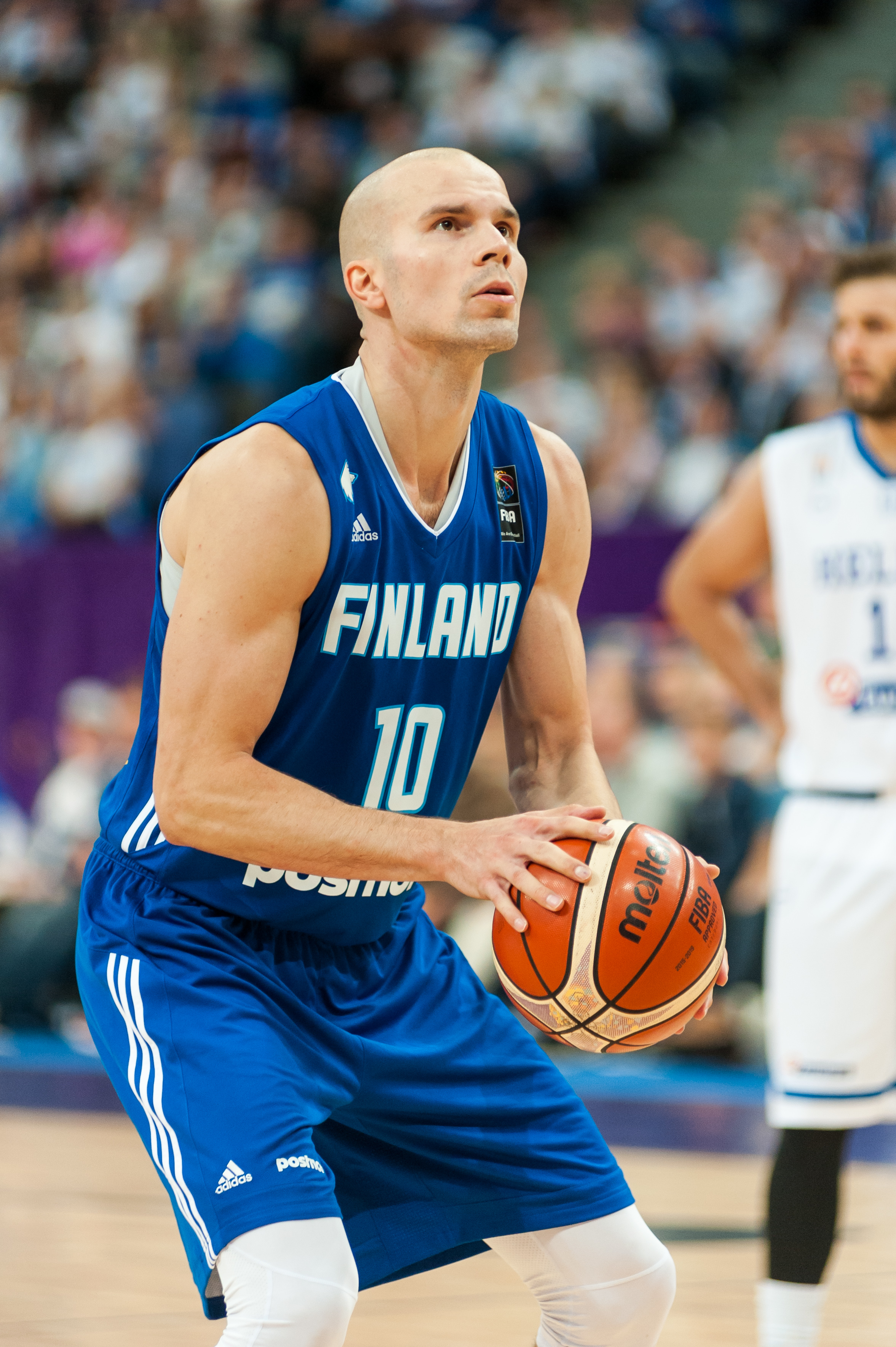
Tuukka Kotti

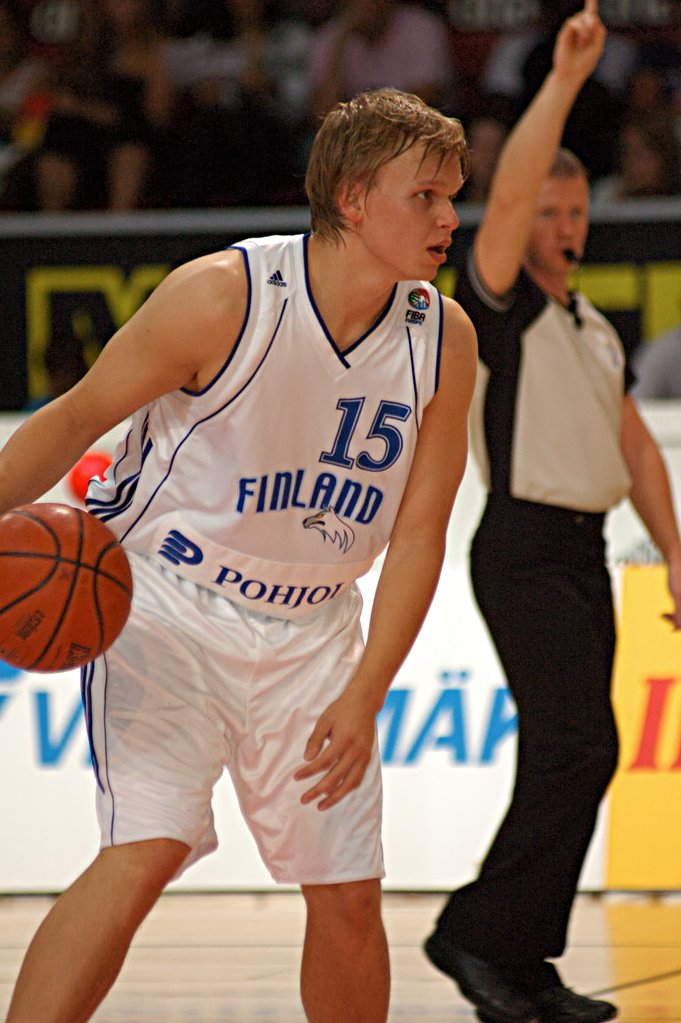
Teemu Rannikko

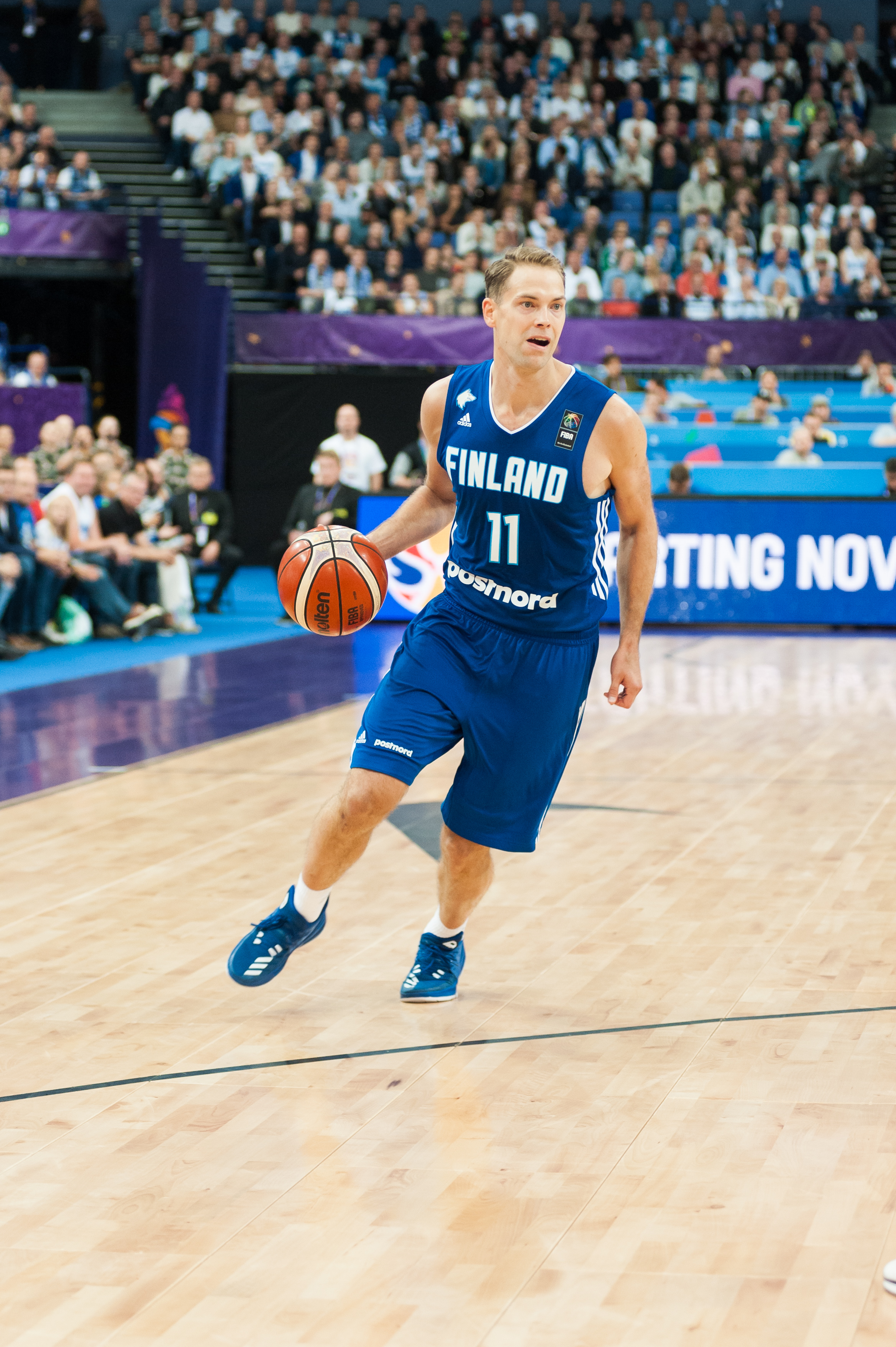
Petteri Koponen

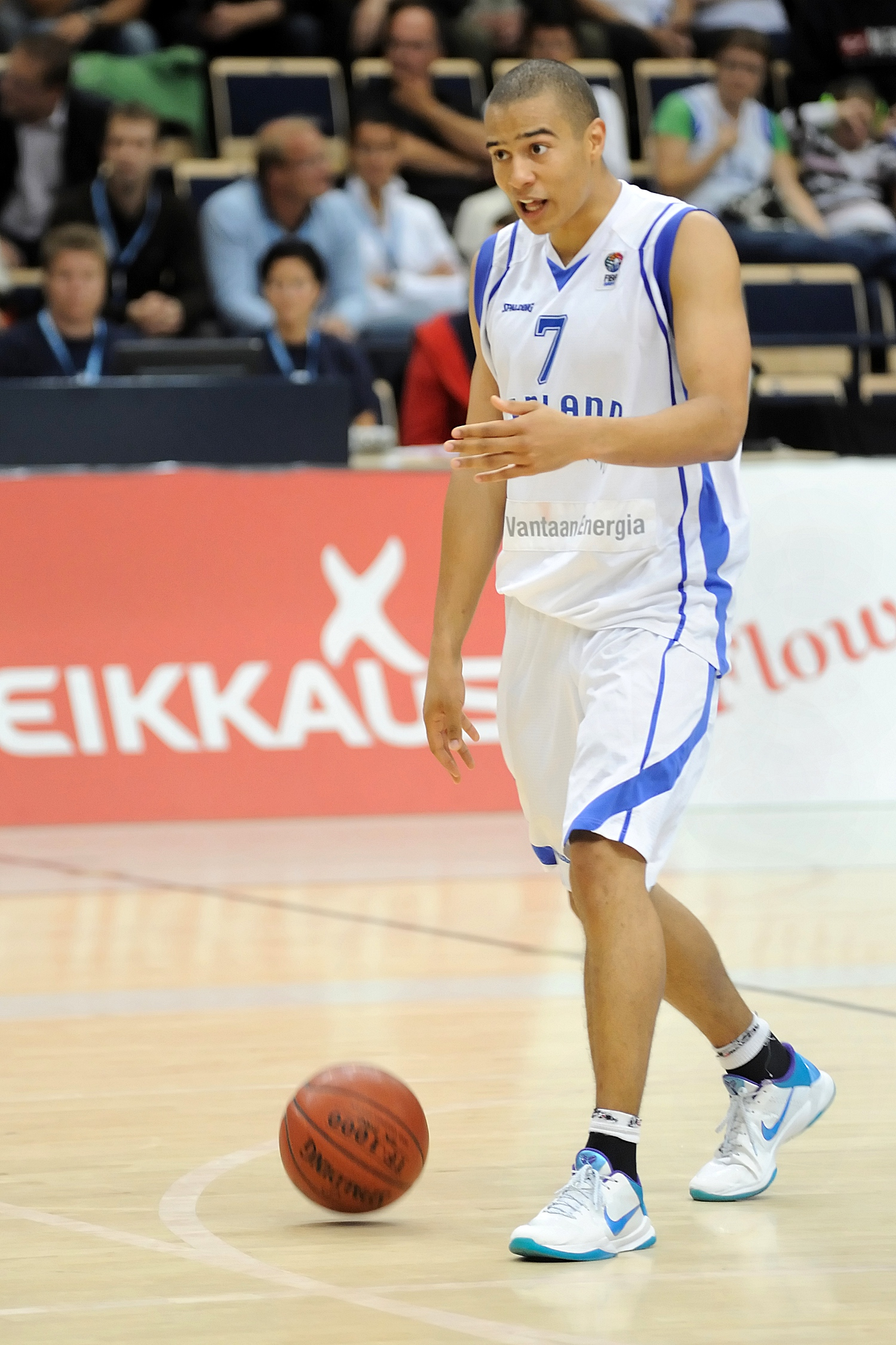
Shawn Huff

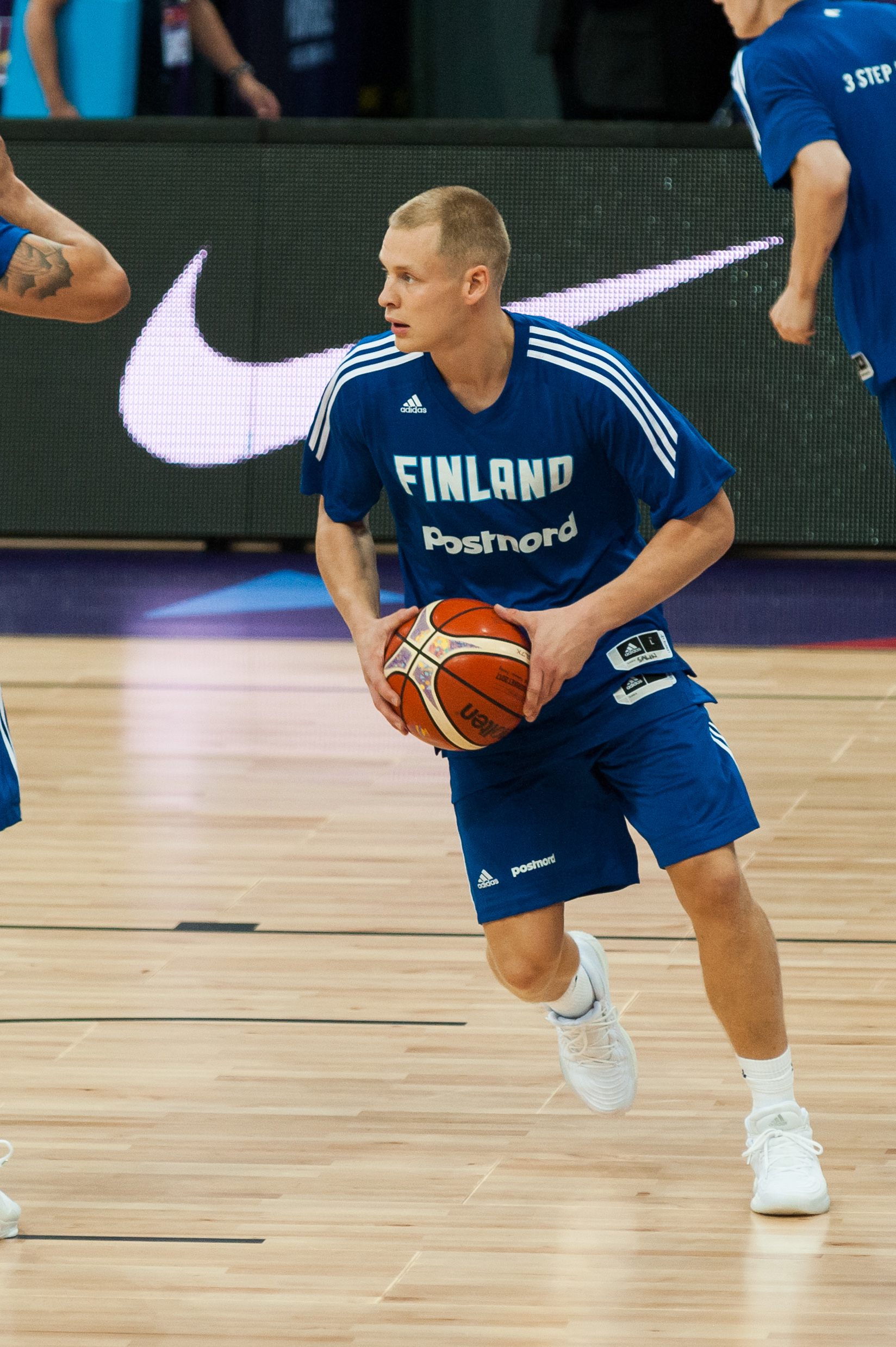
Sasu Salin

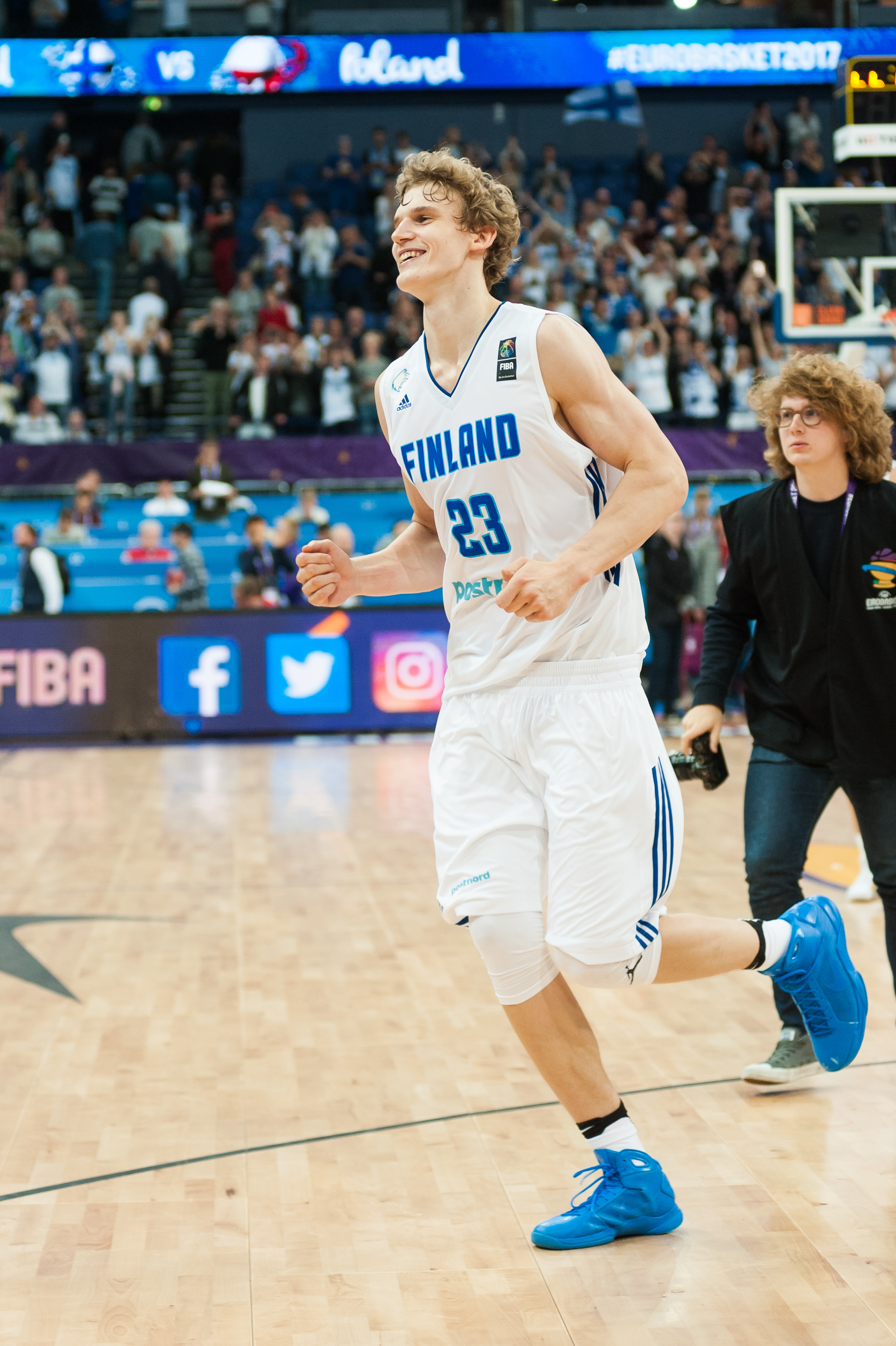
Lauri Markkanen

== Player records ==
=== Most games played ===
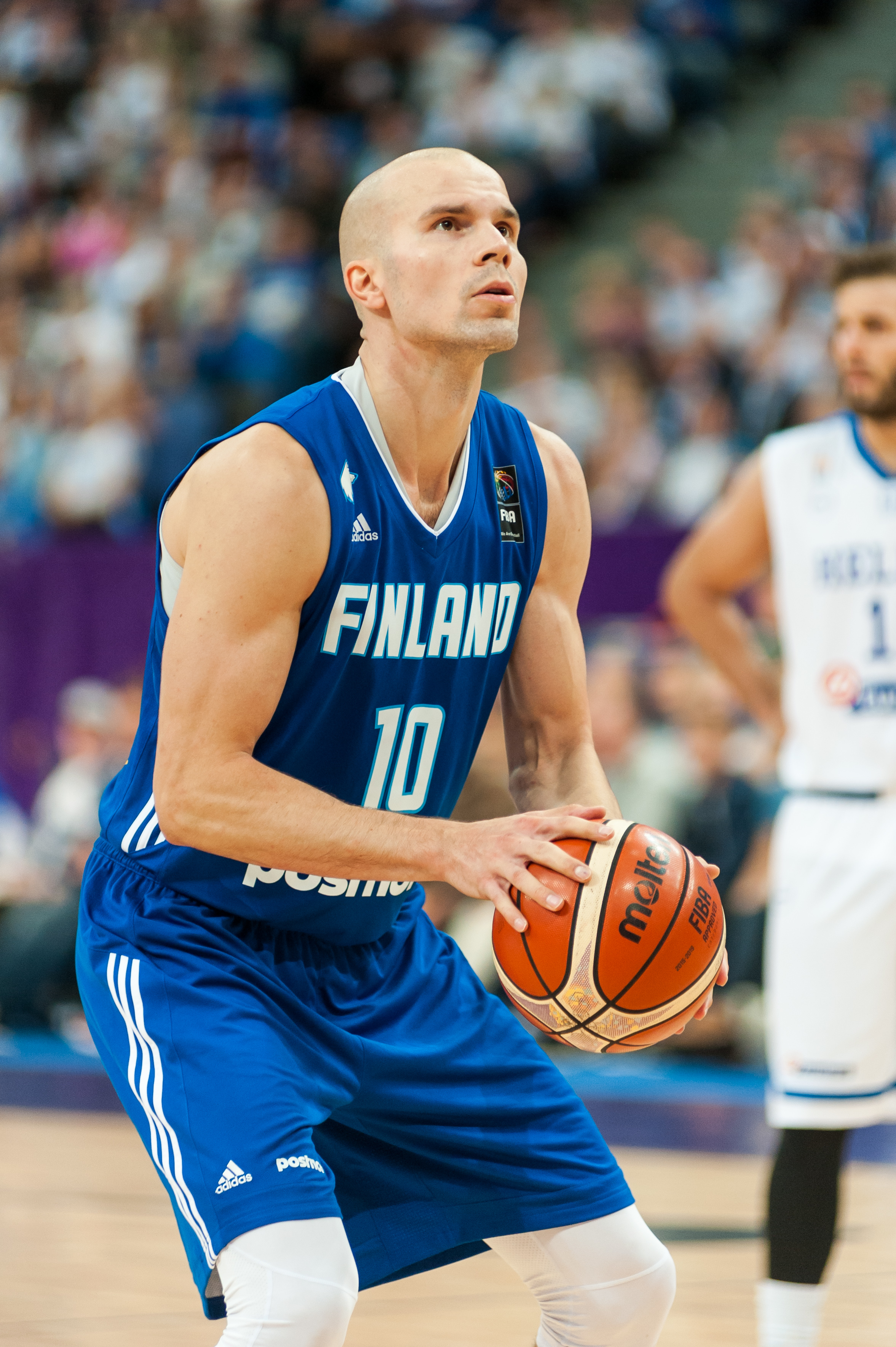
Tuukka Kotti (with the ball), holds the record for the most caps with the senior Finland national team.

- Stat totals as of 9 September 2024.
- Indicates a player that is still actively playing with the senior Finland national team.

Rank	Player	Games played
1.	Tuukka Kotti	226
2.	Shawn Huff	224
3.	Jouko Heikkinen	190
4.	Risto Lignell	169
5.	Hanno Möttölä	165
6.	Jorma Pilkevaara	163
7.	Kari Liimo	156
7.	Kimmo Muurinen	156
9.	Heikki Kasko	154
9.	Petteri Koponen	154

=== Top scorers ===
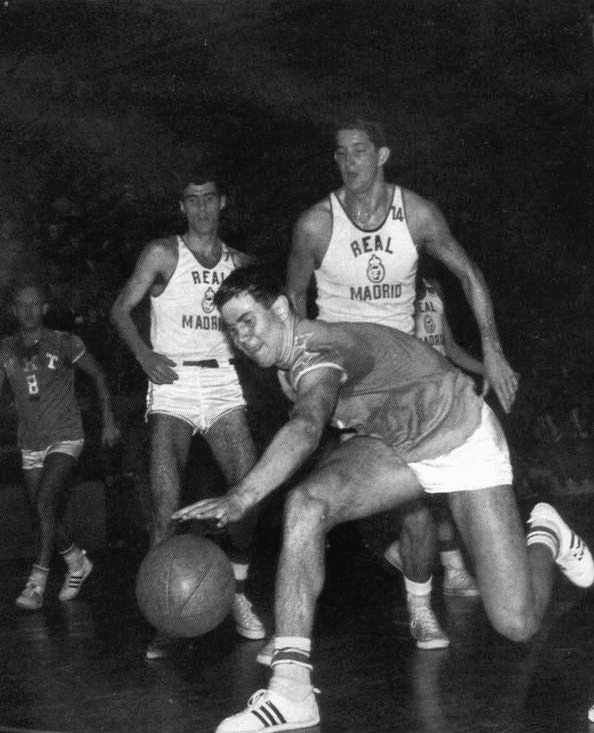
Kari Liimo (in the front, with the ball), holds the record for the most total points scored with the senior Finland national team.

- Stat totals as of 9 September 2024.
- Indicates a player that is still actively playing with the senior Finland national team.

Rank	Player	Games played	Points scored	Ref.
1.	Kari Liimo	154	2,462	
2.	Kalevi Sarkalahti	143	2,377	
3.	Sakari Pehkonen	153	2,007	
4.	Petteri Koponen	154	1,914	
5.	Hanno Möttölä	165	1,901	
6.	Risto Lignell	169	1,895	
7.	Shawn Huff	224	1,811	
8.	Jouko Heikkinen	190	1,749	
9.	Timo Lampén	132	1,720	
10.	Heikki Kasko	154	1,709	
11.	Jorma Pilkevaara	158	1,646	
12.	Tuukka Kotti	226	1,634	
13.	Kari-Pekka Klinga	135	1,589	
14.	Pekka Markkanen	129	1,432	
15.	Sasu Salin	146	1,414	
16.	Teemu Rannikko	149	1,405	
17.	Anssi Rauramo	151	1,379	
18.	Martti Kuisma	90	1,186	
19.	Tapio Sten	134	1,032	
20.	Mikko Koskinen	138	1,029	

== Kit ==
=== Manufacturer ===
- Spalding
- Li-ning
- Adidas
- Avia
- Craft

=== Sponsor ===
- Finnair
- Nokia
- Pirkka
- Vantaan Energia
- Microsoft
- PostNord

== See also ==
- Sport in Finland
- Finland women's national basketball team
- Finland men's national under-20 basketball team
- Finland men's national under-19 basketball team
- Finland men's national under-17 basketball team
