= Mutru =

Mutru is a Finnish surname. Notable people with this surname include:

- Leevi Mutru (born 1995), Finnish Nordic combined skier
- Pertti Mutru (1930–1964), Finnish basketball player
