= Henrik Dettmann =

Finnish basketball coach

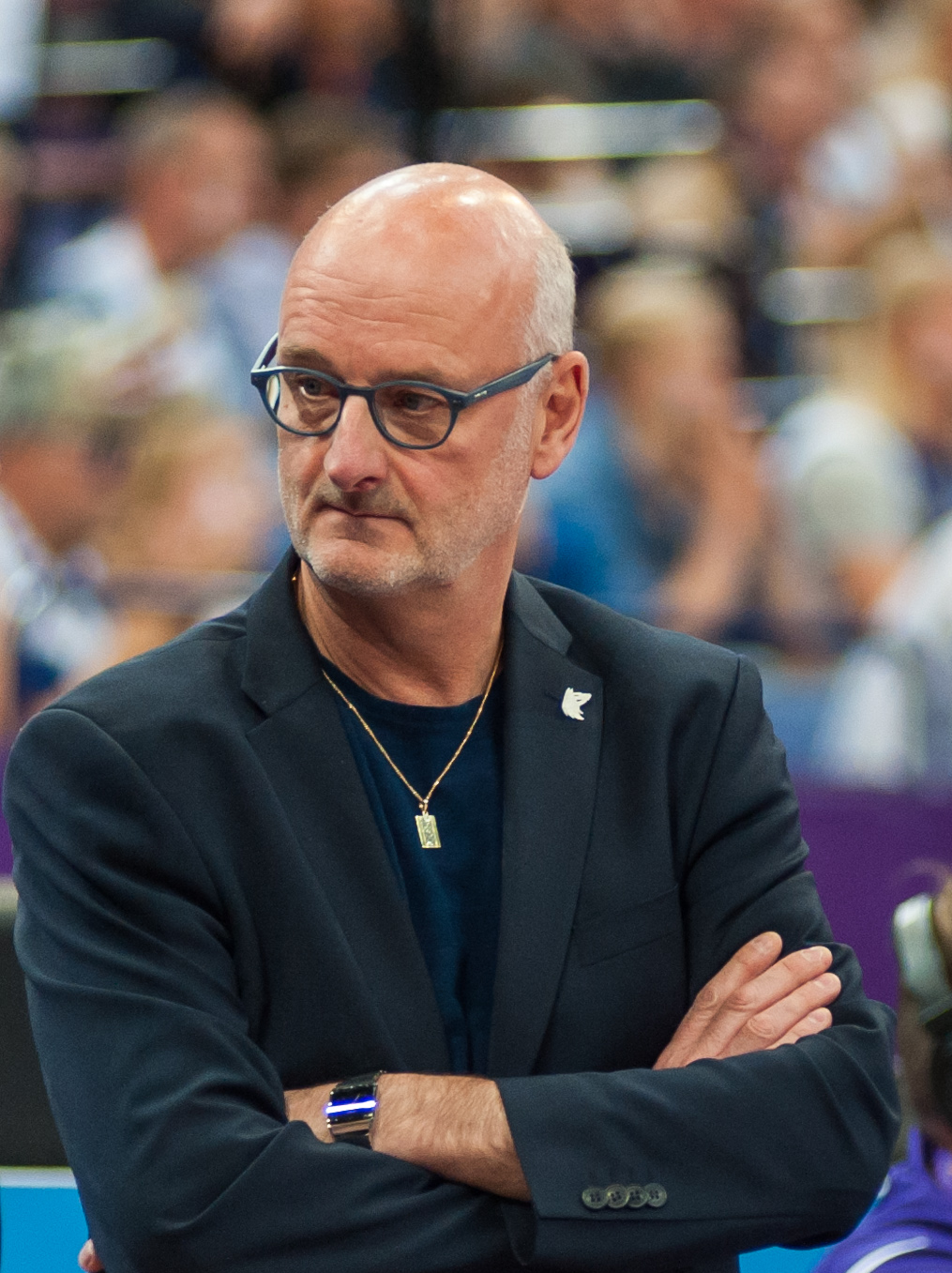
- Dettmann during EuroBasket 2017

Personal information
- Born: April 5, 1958 (age 68) Helsinki, Finland
- Position: Head coach
- Coaching career: 1984–2022

Career history

Coaching
- 1984–1992: NMKY Helsinki
- 1992–1997: Finland
- 1997–2003: Germany
- 2003–2004: Mitteldeutscher
- 2004–2006: Braunschweig
- 2004–2022: Finland
- 2010: JDA Dijon
- 2015: Beşiktaş
- 2016: SIG Strasbourg

Career highlights
- 5x Finnish League champion (1984, 1985, 1987, 1989, 1992); FIBA EuroCup Challenge champion (2004)
Medals
Men's basketball
Head Coach for Germany
World Championship
Bronze medal – third place	2002 United States

Henrik Dettmann (born 5 April 1958) is a Finnish professional basketball coach who last served as head coach of the French LNB Pro A team SIG Strasbourg and the Finnish national basketball team. He was the head coach of German national basketball team from 1997 to 2003, winning the bronze medal at the 2002 FIBA World Championship. In 2004, Dettman won FIBA EuroCup Challenge with Mitteldeutscher. He coached Finland national team on two occasions, for 23 years in total.

Dettmann is currently working as a coaching director of Finland Basketball Association.

== Coaching history ==
World Cup

- Finland: 2014
- Germany: 2002

EuroBasket

- Finland: 1995, 2011, 2013, 2017
- Germany: 1999, 2001, 2003
