= Martti Liimo =

Finnish basketball player (1941–1995)

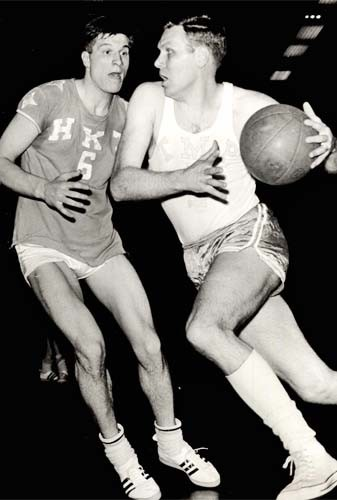
- Liimo (on the left, without the ball), defending Raimo Lindholm (on the right, with the ball).

Personal information
- Born: 26 September 1941 Tampere, Finland
- Died: 1 December 1995 (aged 54) Helsinki, Finland
- Listed height: 6 ft 4.75 in (1.95 m)
- Listed weight: 190 lb (86 kg)

Career information
- Playing career: 1959–1974
- Position: Shooting guard

Career history
- 1959–1965: HKT
- 1965–1966: Tapion Honka
- 1966–1974: HKT

Career highlights
- As a player: 2× FIBA European Selection Team (1965 2×); 5× Finnish SM Championship Series champion (1961–1965); Finnish Basketball Hall of Fame (2016)
Medals
Men's Basketball
Representing Finland
FIBA European Olympic Qualifying Tournament
Gold medal – first place	1964 Switzerland
Nordic Championship
Gold medal – first place	1962
Gold medal – first place	1964

Martti Juhani Liimo (26 September 1941 – 1 December 1995) was a Finnish basketball player. In 2016, he was inducted into the Finnish Basketball Hall of Fame.

== Club career ==
During his club career, Liimo played with the Finnish basketball clubs HKT and Tapion Honka. Limo played in a total of 284 games in the Finnish SM Championship Series, in which he scored a total of 3,847 points, for a scoring average of 13.5 points per game. Liimo was a member of the FIBA European Selection Teams, in 1965.

== National team career ==
Liimo was a member of the senior men's Finnish national team. As a member of Finland's national team, Liimo competed at the following major FIBA tournaments: the 1961 FIBA EuroBasket, the 1963 FIBA EuroBasket, the 1964 FIBA European Olympic Qualifying Tournament, the 1964 Tokyo Summer Olympics, the 1965 FIBA EuroBasket, the 1967 FIBA EuroBasket, and the 1968 FIBA European Olympic Qualifying Tournament.

While representing Finland, he won the Nordic Championship in 1962 and 1964. With Finland, Liimo had a total of 124 caps, in which he scored a total of 980 points, for a career scoring average of 7.9 points per game. His personal single-game scoring record with the Finnish national team was 33 points scored, which came in a game against South Korea, at the 1964 Summer Olympic Games, in Tokyo, Japan.

== Personal life ==
Liimo's younger brother, Kari Liimo, was also a basketball player, and the two brothers were teammates. Liimo played the Frankenstein's monster, in the Stone Face Production company's Finnish television film, Bat Castle, in year 1980.

== Death ==
Limo died on 1 December 1995, in Helsinki, Finland. He was buried at Malmi Cemetery, in Helsinki.
