= Arttu Seppälä =

Finnish footballer (born 1987)

Personal information
- Date of birth: 18 March 1987 (age 39)
- Place of birth: Lapua, Finland
- Height: 1.80 m (5 ft 11 in)
- Position: Winger

Youth career
- Lapuan Virkiä

Senior career*
Years	Team	Apps	(Gls)
2005–2007	KPV	71	(5)
2008–2009	Inter Turku	4	(0)
2009	→ VPS (loan)	4	(1)
2010	VPS	17	(1)
2011	SJK	29	(6)
2012	KooTeePee	21	(1)
2013	KTP	24	(9)
2014–2015	Peli-Karhut	11	(6)
2015	Sudet	6	(0)
2018–2024	SJK-Apollo	32	(10)

International career
	Finland U19	2	(0)
- * Club domestic league appearances and goals

Arttu Seppälä (born 18 March 1987) is a Finnish former professional football player.

He formerly played for KPV and in the 2009 season on loan for VPS Vaasa from FC Inter Turku.

Later Seppälä has worked as a cartoon drawer and as a host. Since 2018, he has also played football for SJK-Apollo in Finnish seventh-tier Kutonen.

In 2025, Seppälä participated in the 11th season of a reality-TV show Diili, the Finnish version of The Apprentice.

His younger brother Ilari is a professional basketball player who plays for the Finland men's national basketball team.
