= Matti Nuutinen =

Finnish basketball player (born 1990)

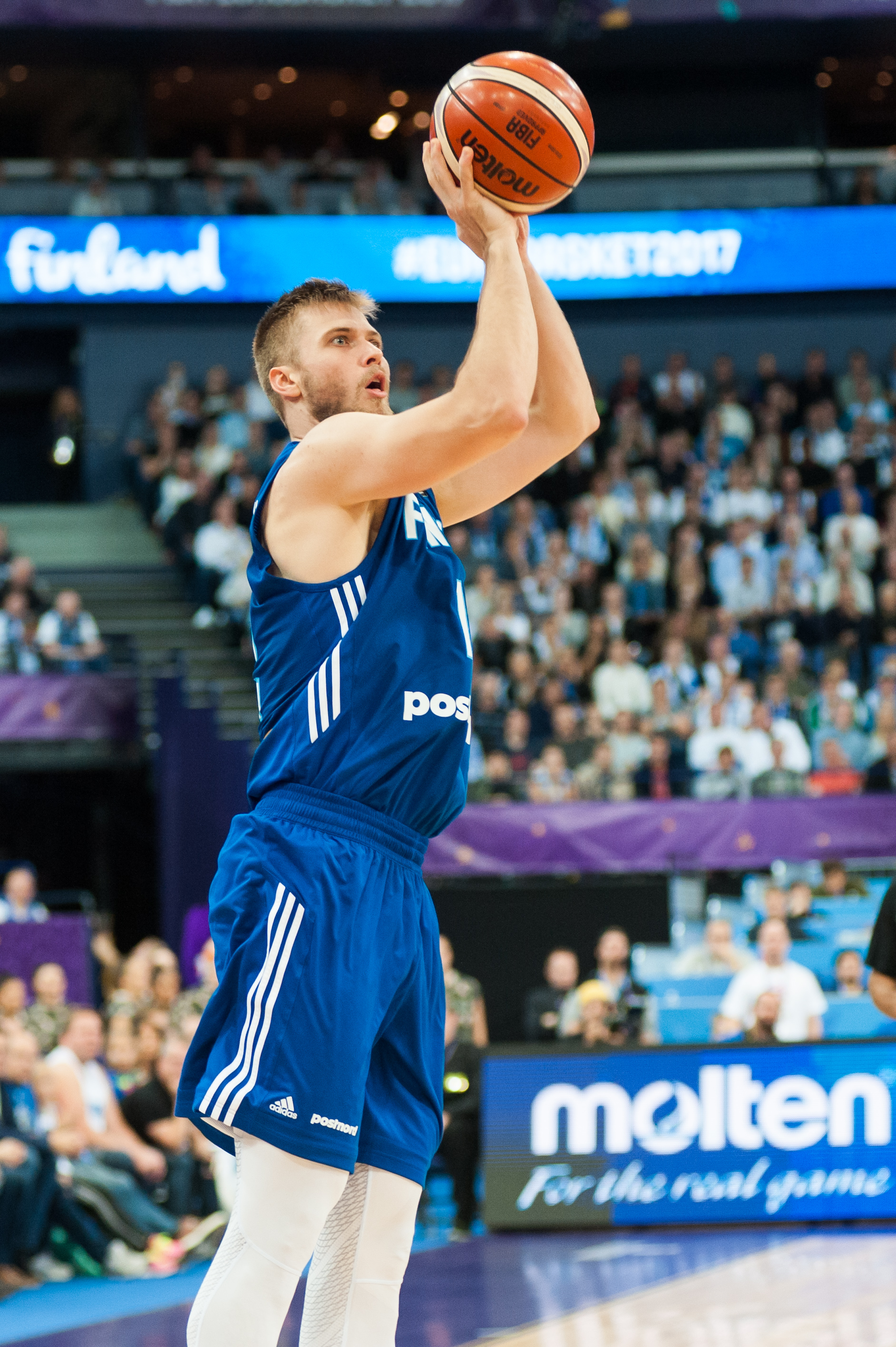
- Nuutinen during EuroBasket 2017

Personal information
- Born: 6 May 1990 (age 36) Turku, Finland
- Listed height: 6 ft 6.75 in (2.00 m)
- Listed weight: 215 lb (98 kg)

Career information
- NBA draft: 2012: undrafted
- Playing career: 2007–2021
- Position: Forward

Career history
- 2007–2010: Kouvot
- 2010–2011: Salon Vilpas
- 2011–2015: Bisons Loimaa
- 2015–2016: Arkadikos
- 2016–2017: Chorale Roanne
- 2017–2018: Pitești
- 2018–2020: Oviedo
- 2020–2021: Ura Basket

Career highlights
- 2x Korisliiga champion (2012, 2013)

Matti Nuutinen (born 6 May 1990) is a Finnish former basketball player. Since 2012, he played for the Finnish national team.

== Honours ==
- Korisliiga: 2012, 2013

== Career statistics ==
Legend
GP	Games played	GS	Games started	MPG	Minutes per game
FG%	Field goal percentage	3P%	3-point field goal percentage	FT%	Free throw percentage
RPG	Rebounds per game	APG	Assists per game	SPG	Steals per game
BPG	Blocks per game	PPG	Points per game	**Bold**	Career high

=== EuroCup ===
Year	Team	GP	GS	MPG	FG%	3P%	FT%	RPG	APG	SPG	BPG	PPG	PIR
2013–14	Bisons Loimaa	9	4	18.9	.441	.353	1.000	1.4	.3	.3	.0	4.1	1.8

=== National team ===
Team	Tournament	Pos.	GP	PPG	RPG	APG
Finland	2014 FIBA World Cup	22nd	3	3.3	2.0	0.0
Finland	EuroBasket 2015	16th	6	7.3	3.8	0.7
Finland	EuroBasket 2017	11th	6	2.3	1.2	0.3
