= Arvo Jantunen =

Finnish basketball player/coach and handballer, footballer, and pesäpallo

Personal information
- Born: April 29, 1929 Viipuri, Finland
- Died: 20 July 2018 (aged 89) Tampere, Finland
- Listed height: 6 ft 1 in (1.85 m)
- Number: 5

Career history

Playing
- 1949–1966: Tampereen Pyrintö

Coaching
- 1963: Finland (assistant)
- 1964–1966: Tampereen Pyrintö

Career highlights
- No. 5 retired by Tampereen Pyrintö

Arvo Johannes Jantunen (April 29, 1929 – July 20, 2018) was a Finnish basketball player and coach who also played handball, football and pesäpallo at the national top-tier level. In basketball, Jantunen represented Tampereen Pyrintö that has retired his jersey. He also played for Finnish national team in three EuroBasket editions.

== Career and personal life ==
In basketball, the 186-centimetre-tall (6 ft 1 in) Jantunen played his whole SM-sarja career for Tampereen Pyrintö. He also worked as the head coach of the team for two seasons in the 1960s. Pyrintö retired Jantunen's jersey in 2014 but per team policy allows players to use his number 5.

Jantunen had 50 caps for the Finland national basketball team and belonged to the Finnish squads in EuroBasket 1957, EuroBasket 1959 and EuroBasket 1961, placing best at 1957 (11th).

Jantunen worked as a P.E. teacher. He died in Tampere at the age of 89 on July 20, 2018.

== Trophies and awards ==
=== Basketball ===
- Jersey #5 retired by Tampereen Pyrintö
- 11th place in EuroBasket 1957, 13th in EuroBasket 1959, 14th in EuroBasket 1961
- SM-sarja silver medal in 1958

=== Handball ===
- Finnish championship in 1959
  - silver in 1954

== Sources ==
- Urheilumme Kasvot Osa 3 Palloilu (in Finnish). Oy Scandia Kirjat Ab. 1973.
- "Arvo Jantunen". Finnish Basketball Association.
- "National Team Statistics". Finnish Basketball Association.
