= Eero Salonen =

Finnish basketball player (1932–2006)

Eero Ilmari Salonen (25 July 1932, Helsinki – 22 May 2006, Thailand) was a Finnish basketball player.

He played for the Finland national basketball team from 1952 until 1959, wearing jersey number 11. He competed with that team in the 1952 Summer Olympics and the EuroBasket championships of 1953, 1955, 1957, and 1959.

After his retirement, Salonen lived in Thailand with his Thai wife.
