= Ilari Seppälä =

Finnish basketball player (born 1993)

Aix Maurienne Savoie Basket
- Position: Point guard
- League: Élite 2

Personal information
- Born: 27 March 1993 (age 33) Lapua, Finland
- Listed height: 1.88 m (6 ft 2 in)
- Listed weight: 82 kg (181 lb)

Career information
- Playing career: 2009–present

Career history
- 2009–2015: Kouvot
- 2015–2016: Bisons Loimaa
- 2016: Kouvot
- 2016–2019: Kataja
- 2019–2021: Aix Maurienne
- 2021–2022: Argeș Pitești
- 2022–2024: Saint-Chamond
- 2024–2026: Kecskemét
- 2026–present: Aix Maurienne

Career highlights
- 2x Finnish Korisliiga champion (2016, 2017)

Ilari Seppälä (born 27 March 1993) is a Finnish professional basketball player for Aix Maurienne Savoie Basket of the French Élite 2. He is a point guard and has represented the Finnish national team internationally.

== Professional career ==
Born in Lapua, Seppälä played in youth teams of local Korikobrat, and started his professional career with Kouvot in Korisliiga in 2009. After a stint with Bisons Loimaa, where they also competed in VTB United League, Seppälä returned to Kouvot in 2016 and won the Finnish championship there. Next season he joined Kataja and repeated as Finnish champion. He also played with Kataja in Basketball Champions League and FIBA Europe Cup.

In 2019, he joined Aix Maurienne in French LNB Pro B, and averaged nearly 15 points per game in his second year with the team.

During the 2021–22 season, Seppälä played for Argeș Pitești in Romanian Liga Națională, averaging 10.3 points and 4.8 assists per game.

In 2022, he returned to France and joined Saint-Chamond in Pro B, where he spent two seasons.

On 24 October 2024, Seppälä signed for Kecskeméti TE in Hungarian Nemzeti Bajnokság I/A, averaging 17.6 points and 4.7 assists per game.

== National team career ==
A former youth international, Seppälä has played for the Finland national team regularly since 2017. He was named in the Finland squad for the EuroBasket 2022, 2023 FIBA World Cup and EuroBasket 2025 tournaments.

== Personal life ==
His older brother Arttu is a cartoon drawer and former professional footballer, who also won the 11th edition of Diili, the Finnish version of The Apprentice reality television competition.

== Career statistics ==
Legend
GP	Games played	GS	Games started	MPG	Minutes per game
FG%	Field goal percentage	3P%	3-point field goal percentage	FT%	Free throw percentage
RPG	Rebounds per game	APG	Assists per game	SPG	Steals per game
BPG	Blocks per game	PPG	Points per game	**Bold**	Career high

=== FIBA Champions League ===
Year	Team	GP	GS	MPG	FG%	3P%	FT%	RPG	APG	SPG	BPG	PPG
2016–17	Kataja	16	16	16.0	.371	.349	.750	1.5	2.1	.2	.0	4.5

=== National team ===
Team	Tournament	Pos.	GP	PPG	RPG	APG
Finland	EuroBasket 2022	7th	5	3.2	0.4	2.4
Finland	2023 FIBA World Cup	21st	4	5.5	0.8	3.0
Finland	EuroBasket 2025	4th	5	1.0	0.4	1.8
