= Uolevi Manninen =

Finnish basketball player and businessman

Uolevi Manninen (7 April 1937 – 10 November 2009) was a Finnish Olympic basketball player and businessman.

Born in Äänekoski, Uolevi Manninen was involved in Finland's most successful basketball team, which participated in the Tokyo Olympics in 1964 and finished in 11th place, and Finland finished sixth place in the European Championships held in 1967.

The 202 cm (6 ft 7.5 inch) Manninen also competed in the EM-Cup a total of four times and won the gold medal three times. Internationally, he played 106 times for the Finnish national basketball team.

He later became a businessman, working as Kalle Anttila's Managing Director for Anttila from 1976 to 1993 and in wholesale from 1993–1996.
