= Shawn Huff =

Finnish basketball player

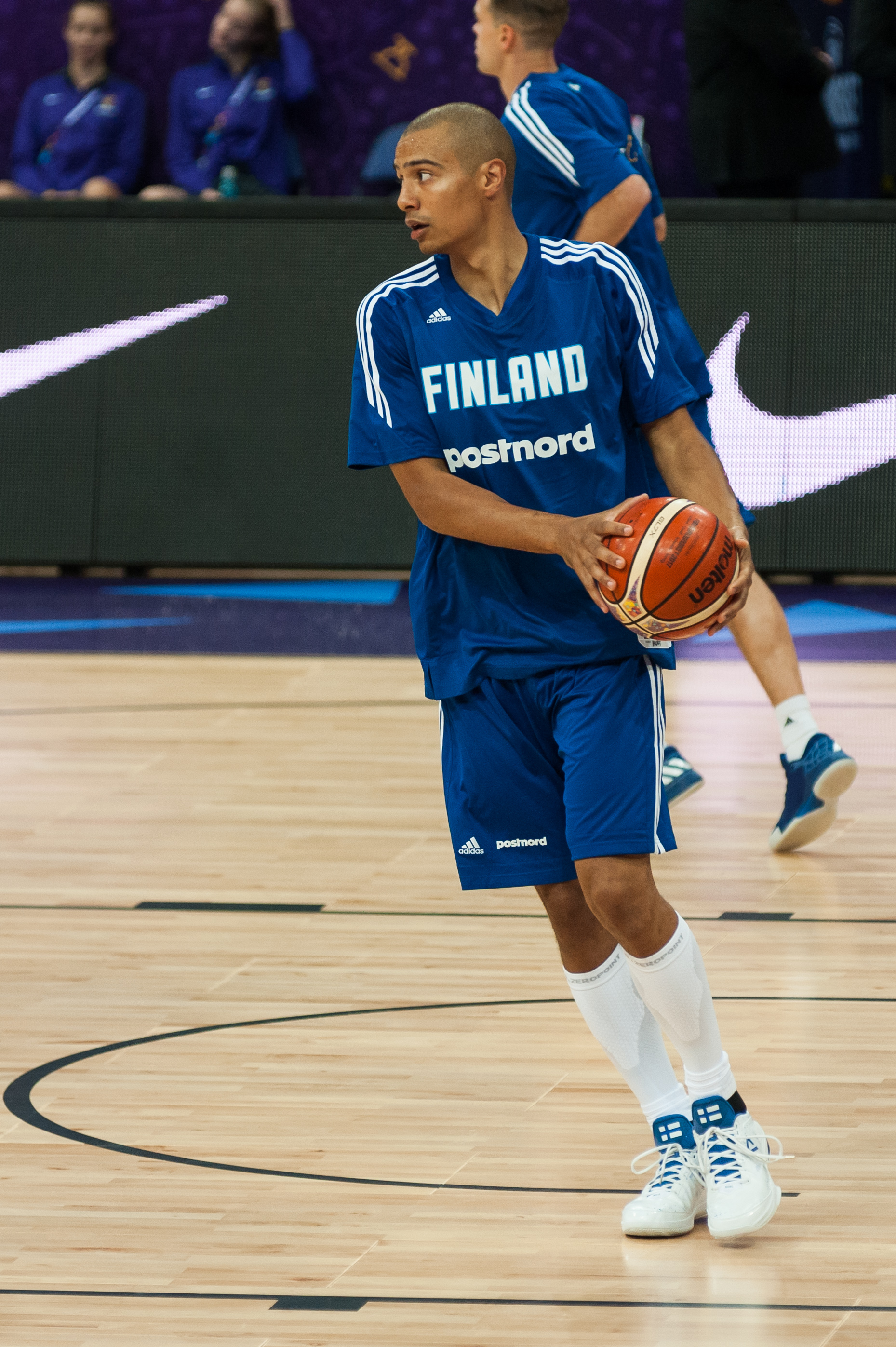
- Huff with Finland during EuroBasket 2017

Personal information
- Born: May 5, 1984 (age 42) Helsinki, Finland
- Listed height: 1.98 m (6 ft 6 in)
- Listed weight: 95 kg (209 lb)

Career information
- High school: Mäkelänrinne (Helsinki, Finland)
- College: Valparaiso (2004–2008)
- NBA draft: 2008: undrafted
- Playing career: 2000–2022
- Position: Small forward

Career history
- 2000–2001: Torpan Pojat
- 2001–2004: Espoon Honka
- 2008–2009: Maroussi
- 2009–2011: Kavala
- 2011–2012: Fulgor Libertas Forlì
- 2012–2013: Vanoli Cremona
- 2013: Orlandina
- 2013–2016: Riesen Ludwigsburg
- 2016–2017: ESSM Le Portel
- 2017–2019: Skyliners Frankfurt
- 2019–2022: Helsinki Seagulls

Career highlights
- 2× Finnish League champion (2002, 2003); 3x Finnish Cup winner (2020, 2021, 2022)

Shawn Christopher Huff (born May 5, 1984) is a Finnish politician and a former professional basketball player. He played college basketball at Valparaiso from 2004 to 2008. Shawn Huff played for Finland national basketball team, serving as the team captain.

== College career ==
Huff played college basketball at Valparaiso University from 2004 to 2008. Huff played as a true freshman but did not become a full-time starter until his junior season. As a senior, he started all 36 games.

== Professional career ==
Huff went undrafted in the 2008 NBA draft and went on to play internationally. Signed with the MHP RIESEN Ludwigsburg team on September 20, 2013, and recently played for them since till the end of the 2015–16 season.

On January 5, 2017, Huff signed with the German team Fraport Skyliners.

Shawn Huff retired from professional basketball after the EuroBasket 2022.

== Outside basketball ==
In the 2021 Finnish municipal elections, Huff became a member of the Helsinki city council for Green League. Huff was a candidate in the 2023 Finnish parliamentary election, but was not elected.

== Personal life ==
Huff is the son of African-American professional basketball player Leon Huff who played college basketball at Drake University and professionally in Finland. Leon Huff, was named to Drake's All-Decade team for the 1970s. Once Leon Huff was done playing basketball he managed some professional basketball teams in Finland. Leon Huff had three children including Dawn Huff (born 1972), Shawn Huff (born 1984), and Michael Huff (born 1987). His Finnish mother is named Kristina. Through his sister, Dawn, who married Stacy Elliott, he is the uncle of Ezekiel Elliott, who was a running back for the Dallas Cowboys of the National Football League (NFL).

Shawn and his father Leon are part of the 2023 Finnish documentary movie Suomeen juurtuneet (Home and Away), directed by Arto Halonen.

Huff has two children with Finnish high jumper Tilda Huff (née Hämäläinen), to whom he was married until 2025. Tilda's sister Ida is married to Finnish basketball player Gerald Lee.

Huff is a vegetarian. He participated in the 16th season of Tanssii tähtien kanssa (Finnish version of Strictly Come Dancing) in 2023.

== Career statistics ==
Legend
| GP | Games played | GS | Games started | MPG | Minutes per game |
| FG% | Field goal percentage | 3P% | 3-point field goal percentage | FT% | Free throw percentage |
| RPG | Rebounds per game | APG | Assists per game | SPG | Steals per game |
| BPG | Blocks per game | PPG | Points per game | **Bold** | Career high |

=== EuroCup ===
| Year | Team | GP | GS | MPG | FG% | 3P% | FT% | RPG | APG | SPG | BPG | PPG | PIR |
|---|---|---|---|---|---|---|---|---|---|---|---|---|---|
| 2008–09 | Maroussi | 12 | 0 | 9.3 | **.450** | .357 | **.750** | .6 | .4 | .2 | .0 | 2.2 | 1.7 |
| 2015–16 | Riesen Ludwigsburg | **16** | 1 | 17.4 | .429 | **.409** | **.750** | 2.9 | .2 | .4 | .1 | **8.1** | **6.2** |
| 2018–19 | Skyliners Frankfurt | 15 | **7** | **23.4** | .367 | .308 | .706 | **3.5** | **1.1** | **.6** | **.4** | 5.7 | 6.0 |
| Career | | 43 | 8 | 17.3 | .407 | 0.364 | 0.730 | 2.4 | .6 | .4 | .2 | 5.6 | 4.9 |

=== National team ===
| Team | Tournament | Pos. | GP | PPG | RPG | APG |
|---|---|---|---|---|---|---|
| Finland | EuroBasket 2011 | 9th | 8 | 9.0 | 3.6 | 0.9 |
| Finland | EuroBasket 2013 | 9th | 8 | 8.8 | 4.8 | 1.0 |
| Finland | 2014 FIBA World Cup | 22nd | 5 | 10.8 | 3.4 | 0.0 |
| Finland | EuroBasket 2015 | 16th | 6 | 8.5 | 2.7 | 1.0 |
| Finland | EuroBasket 2017 | 11th | 6 | 5.3 | 5.5 | 0.8 |
| Finland | EuroBasket 2022 | 7th | 7 | 4.9 | 2.3 | 1.0 |
