= Kauko Jämsén =

Finnish ambassador

Kauko Jämsén (born 22 July 1943, in Helsinki) served as the Finnish ambassador to Bulgaria from 2005 to 2009. Prior to that he was Finland's General-Consul in St. Petersburg in 2001–2005. He is a Master of Political Science degree. At the Ministry for Foreign Affairs he started in 1975.

As a diplomat, Jämsén has also acted as a basketball coach and journalist. He was the head coach of the Finnish basketball team in 1974–1976, and he has also trained Helsinki YMCA and Porvoo Tarmo. Between 1970 and 1973 he worked as a labor market and political editor at Ilta-Sanomat and from 1973 to 1975 as a financial editor of Helsingin Sanomat.

Jämsén is married to Hannele Eerola-Jämsén. He has five children.
