= Andre Gustavson =

Finnish basketball player (born 1999)

Free Agent
- Position: Shooting guard / point guard

Personal information
- Born: 7 May 1999 (age 27) Helsinki, Finland
- Listed height: 1.97 m (6 ft 6 in)
- Listed weight: 95 kg (209 lb)

Career information
- High school: Helsinki Basketball Academy (Helsinki, Finland)
- College: Richmond (2018–2023)
- NBA draft: 2023: undrafted
- Playing career: 2016–present

Career history
- 2016–2018: HBA-Märsky
- 2024–2025: Kauhajoki Karhu
- 2025–2026: Oostende

Andre Gustavson (born 7 May 1999), is a Finnish professional basketball player who last played for the Oostende of the BNXT League and for the Finland national team.

== Youth career ==
Born in Helsinki, Gustavson started playing basketball in a local club Wartti Basket. Later he joined the Helsinki Basketball Academy and played for the academy team HBA-Märsky in Finnish second-tier Koripallon I-divisioona.

== College career ==
In April 2018, Gustavson committed to University of Richmond basketball team.

== Professional career ==
During his last college season, Gustavson suffered from chronic hip problems which resulted in surgeries. After a one-year hiatus due to injuries after finishing college, Gustavson turned professional for the 2024–25 season when he signed with Kauhajoki Karhu Basket in Finnish top-tier Korisliiga. He averaged 13.4 points, 5.4 rebounds, 1.8 assists and 2.1 steals. He also shot 45.6% from the field, as the team finished 2nd in the league and won the silver medal.

On 4 December, 2025, Gustavson signed for Oostende of the BNXT League and the FIBA Champions League.

== International career ==
Gustavson has played for Finland U16 and U18 national teams. He was also part of the Finland U17 roster at the 2016 FIBA U17 World Cup in Zaragoza, Spain, where he averaged 11 points and 3.7 rebounds in seven games.

Currently Gustavson plays for the Finland men's national basketball team. He was named in the Finland roster for the 2024 FIBA Olympic qualifying tournament in Valencia, Spain, for matches against Bahamas, Poland and Spain.

Gustavson was named in the Finland squad for the EuroBasket 2025 final tournament.

== Career statistics ==
Legend
GP	Games played	GS	Games started	MPG	Minutes per game
FG%	Field goal percentage	3P%	3-point field goal percentage	FT%	Free throw percentage
RPG	Rebounds per game	APG	Assists per game	SPG	Steals per game
BPG	Blocks per game	PPG	Points per game	**Bold**	Career high

=== FIBA Champions League ===
Year	Team	GP	GS	MPG	FG%	3P%	FT%	RPG	APG	SPG	BPG	PPG
2025–26	Oostende	2	2	22.2	.250	.000	.500	7.0	.5	1.0	.0	2.5

=== National team ===
Team	Tournament	Pos.	GP	PPG	RPG	APG
Finland	EuroBasket 2025	4th	9	1.3	1.0	0.9

=== College ===
Year	Team	GP	GS	MPG	FG%	3P%	FT%	RPG	APG	SPG	BPG	PPG
2018–19	Richmond	31	19	21.9	.471	.340	.625	2.3	**1.5**	**1.1**	**.3**	4.8
2019–20	Richmond	31	6	19.4	.450	.162	**.769**	2.7	.8	.7	.2	4.4
2020–21	Richmond	18	1	17.2	**.509**	.320	.722	2.2	.7	.4	**.3**	4.4
2021–22	Richmond	28	20	24.5	.390	.308	.692	2.5	1.1	**1.1**	.2	4.5
2022–23	Richmond	**33**	**33**	**29.4**	.496	**.373**	.650	**3.1**	1.2	1.0	.2	**4.9**
Career		141	79	23.0	.461	.309	.696	2.6	1.1	.9	.2	4.6
