= Lassi Tuovi =

Finnish professional basketball coach (born 1986)

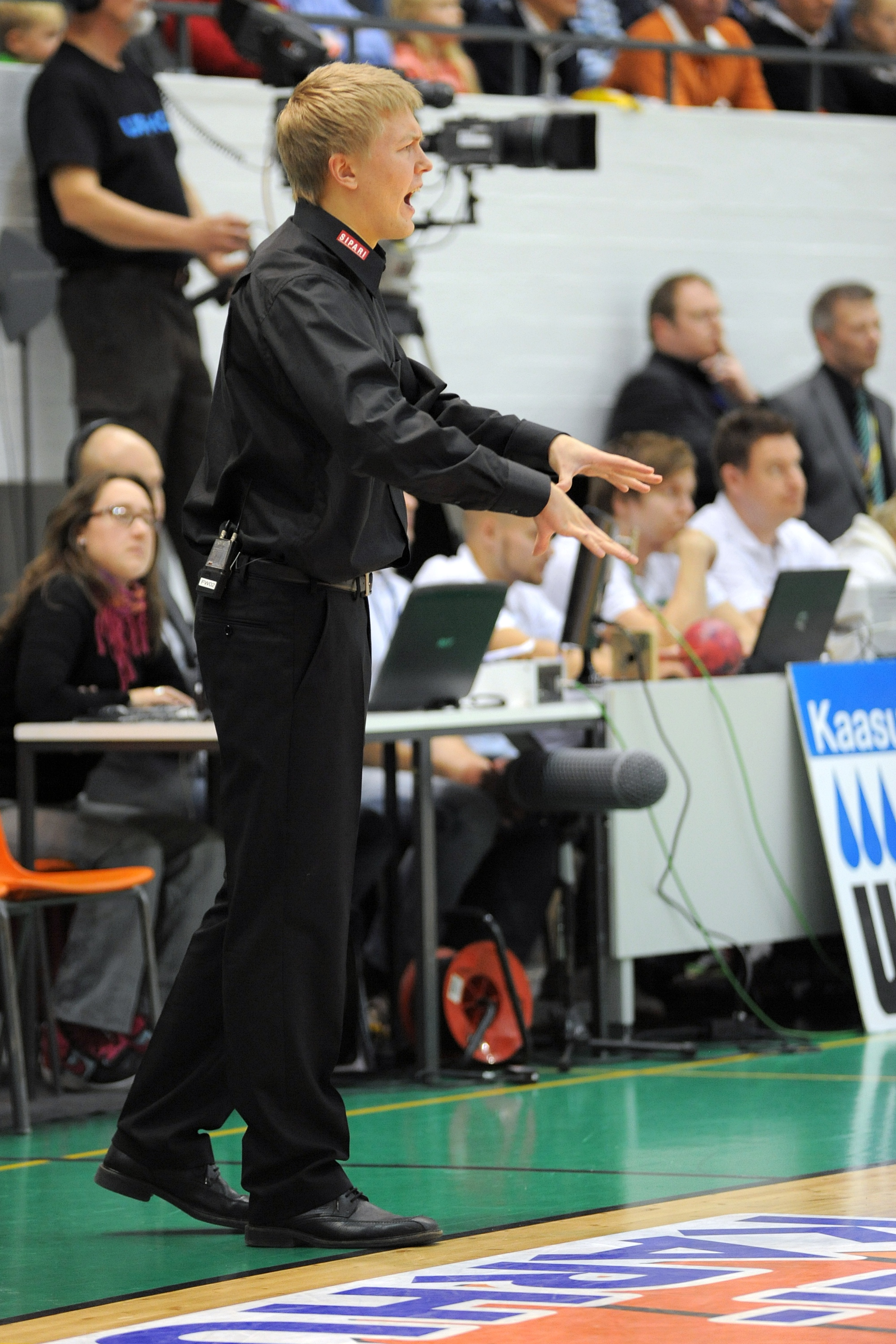
- Tuovi coaching Lappeenrannan NMKY in 2011.

Yokohama B-Corsairs
- Position: Head coach
- League: B.League

Personal information
- Born: 31 December 1986 (age 39) Lappeenranta, Finland

Career history

Coaching
- 2010–2022: Finland (assistant)
- 2011–2014: Lappeenrannan NMKY
- 2014–2016: Beşiktaş (assistant)
- 2016–2017: SIG Strasbourg (assistant)
- 2017–2018: BCM Gravelines (assistant)
- 2018–2020: SIG Strasbourg (assistant)
- 2020–2022: SIG Strasbourg
- 2022–present: Finland
- 2023–2024: Virtus Bologna (assistant)
- 2024–present: Yokohama B-Corsairs

Lassi Tuovi (born 31 December 1986) is a Finnish professional basketball coach who currently serves as the head coach for Yokohama B-Corsairs and the Finland national team.

== Career ==
Tuovi guided the Finland national team in EuroBasket 2022, in his first international tournament as a head coach. Finland ultimately finished in the 7th place, as they reached to their first quarterfinal appearance in 55 years, the last being in 1967.

On 29 June 2023, Tuovi was appointed as the assistant coach of the Utah Jazz of the National Basketball Association (NBA), for the 2023 NBA Summer League.

He led the Finland national team to the 2023 FIBA Basketball World Cup, which was their second-ever appearance in the FIBA World Cup tournament.

On 29 September 2023, Tuovi was appointed as the assistant head coach of Virtus Bologna in LBA and EuroLeague.

On 16 June 2024, Tuovi was named the head coach of Yokohama B-Corsairs in Japan's B.League.

Tuovi coached Finland national team at the EuroBasket 2025, where they historically reached the semi-finals by beating Serbia led by Nikola Jokić, and finished 4th in the tournament. Tuovi also became the youngest coach since 2003 to lead his team to EuroBasket semi-finals.
