= Kalevi Tuominen =

Finnish basketball coach, player, and sports executive (1927–2020)

Personal information
- Born: 9 August 1927 Vesilahti, Finland
- Died: 23 January 2020 (aged 92) Helsinki, Finland
- Listed height: 5 ft 8.5 in (1.74 m)

Career history

Playing
- 1952–1963: Tampereen Pyrintö

Coaching
- 1955–1969: Finland
- 1956: Finland (women)
- 1959–1960: Finland (women)
- 1960–1964: Tampereen Pyrintö

Career highlights
- As player: Finnish Basketball Hall of Fame; No. 15 retired by the Tampereen Pyrintö

Kalevi Vilho Tapio ”Kallu” Tuominen (9 August 1927 – 23 January 2020) was a Finnish basketball coach and player and sports executive, who also played handball and football at the national top-tier level as well as practiced many other sports. He worked as the overall head coach of the Finnish Olympic Committee between 1969 and 1992. In basketball, the 174-centimetre-tall (5 ft 9 in) Jantunen played his whole SM-sarja career for Tampereen Pyrintö and also coached the team between 1960 and 1964. He was capped 11 times as a player and was a long-time head coach of Finland men's national team in its peak era. During Tuominen's coaching years 1955–1969 Finland qualified for the 1964 Summer Olympics in Tokyo (the only Finnish ball game team still in 2016 that has advanced to the Olympics through qualification), where it placed 11th, and played in seven EuroBaskets (1955 [Tuominen as player-coach], 1957, 1959, 1961, 1963, 1965 and 1967). In EuroBasket 1967 arranged in Finland, the host team placed sixth, which is still in 2016 Finland's best position in EuroBasket. Finland women's national basketball team placed 11th with Tuominen's guidance in EuroBasket 1956 Women. He also worked as a FIBA-licensed referee. Tuominen was inducted to the Finnish Basketball Hall of Fame as one of its first members in 2009. Pyrintö has retired Tuominen's jersey but allows players to use his number 15.

Tuominen died after a long illness at Suursuo Hospital in Helsinki on 23 January 2020, aged 92.

== Trophies, awards and achievements ==
- Inducted in Finnish Basketball Hall of Fame
- Jersey #15 retired by Tampereen Pyrintö

=== Basketball (player) ===
- 10th place in EuroBasket 1955
- SM-sarja silver medal in 1958

=== Basketball (coach) ===
- Finland national team
  - 1964 Summer Olympics (11th)
  - six EuroBaskets, 6th place in 1967
- Finland women's national team
  - 11th in EuroBasket 1956 Women

== Sources ==
- Urheilumme Kasvot Osa 3 Palloilu (in Finnish). Oy Scandia Kirjat Ab. 1973.
- "Kalevi Tuominen". Finnish Basketball Association. Archived from the original on 5 March 2016.
- "National Team Statistics". Finnish Basketball Association. Archived from the original on 4 March 2016.
- "Kalevi Tuominen profile". archive.fiba.com. Archived from the original on 20 May 2018.
