= Arto Koivisto (basketball) =

Finnish basketball player (1930–2016)

Personal information
- Born: 12 April 1930 Sääminki, Finland
- Died: 6 March 2016 (aged 85) Espoo, Finland
- Listed height: 5 ft 9.5 in (1.77 m)

Career history
- 1951–1958: Karhun Pojat
- 1959–1961: Työväen Maila-Pojat
- 1963–1966: Karhun Pojat

Career highlights
- SM-sarja top scorer in 1953; EuroBaskets 1951 (9th) and 1957 (11th)

Erkki Arto Juhani Koivisto (12 April 1930 – 6 March 2016) was a Finnish basketball player.

The 177-centimetre-tall (5 ft 10 in) Koivisto played his SM-sarja career for Karhun Pojat and Työväen Maila-Pojat. He was the top scorer of the league in 1953 season. Koivisto also capped 21 times for Finland men's national team and represented his country at the EuroBasket tournaments in 1951 and 1957 where Finland placed ninth and 11th, respectively. After his career as a player Koivisto worked as a headmaster. Koivisto died on 6 March 2016 in Espoo at 85 years of age.

== Sources ==
- "Aro Koivisto". Finnish Basketball Association.
- "National Team Statistics". Finnish Basketball Association. Archived from the original on 4 March 2016.
