= Kauko Kauppinen =

Finnish basketball player (1940–2023)

Personal information
- Nationality: Finnish
- Born: 12 January 1940; Vihti, Finland
- Died: 27 March 2023 (aged 83)

Sport
- Sport: Basketball

Kauko Kauppinen (12 January 1940 – 27 March 2023) was a Finnish basketball player. He competed in the men's tournament at the 1964 Summer Olympics in which Finland placed 11th.
