= Raine Nuutinen =

Finnish basketball player (1931–2012)

Personal information
- Nationality: Finnish
- Born: 8 June 1931; Helsinki, Finland
- Died: 5 August 2012 (aged 81); Helsinki, Finland

Sport
- Sport: Basketball

Raine Nuutinen (8 June 1931 – 5 August 2012) was a Finnish basketball player. He competed in the men's tournament at the 1952 Summer Olympics.
