= Basketball Finland =

Governing body of basketball in Finland

- Founded: 1939; 87 years ago
- Affiliation: FIBA Europe
- Headquarters: Espoo
- President: Timo Elo

Official website
- www.basket.fi

Basketball Finland (Finnish: Suomen Koripalloliitto ry, Swedish: Finska Basketbollförbund) is the governing body of basketball in Finland. It was founded and became members of FIBA in 1939.

Basketball Finland operates the Finland men's national team and Finland women's national team. They organize national competitions in Finland, for both the men's and women's senior teams and also the youth national basketball teams. They also organize the Helsinki Basketball Academy through a cooperative agreement with Mäkelänrinne Upper Secondary School.

The top professional league in Finland is the men's Korisliiga. The national championship basketball league for women is Naisten Korisliiga.

== National teams ==
=== Senior ===
- Finland men's national basketball team
- Finland women's national basketball team

=== U20 ===
- Finland men's national under-20 basketball team
- Finland women's national under-20 basketball team

=== U18 ===
- Finland men's national under-18 basketball team
- Finland women's national under-18 basketball team

=== Youth ===
- Finland men's national under-17 basketball team
- Finland women's national under-16 basketball team

== Leagues ==
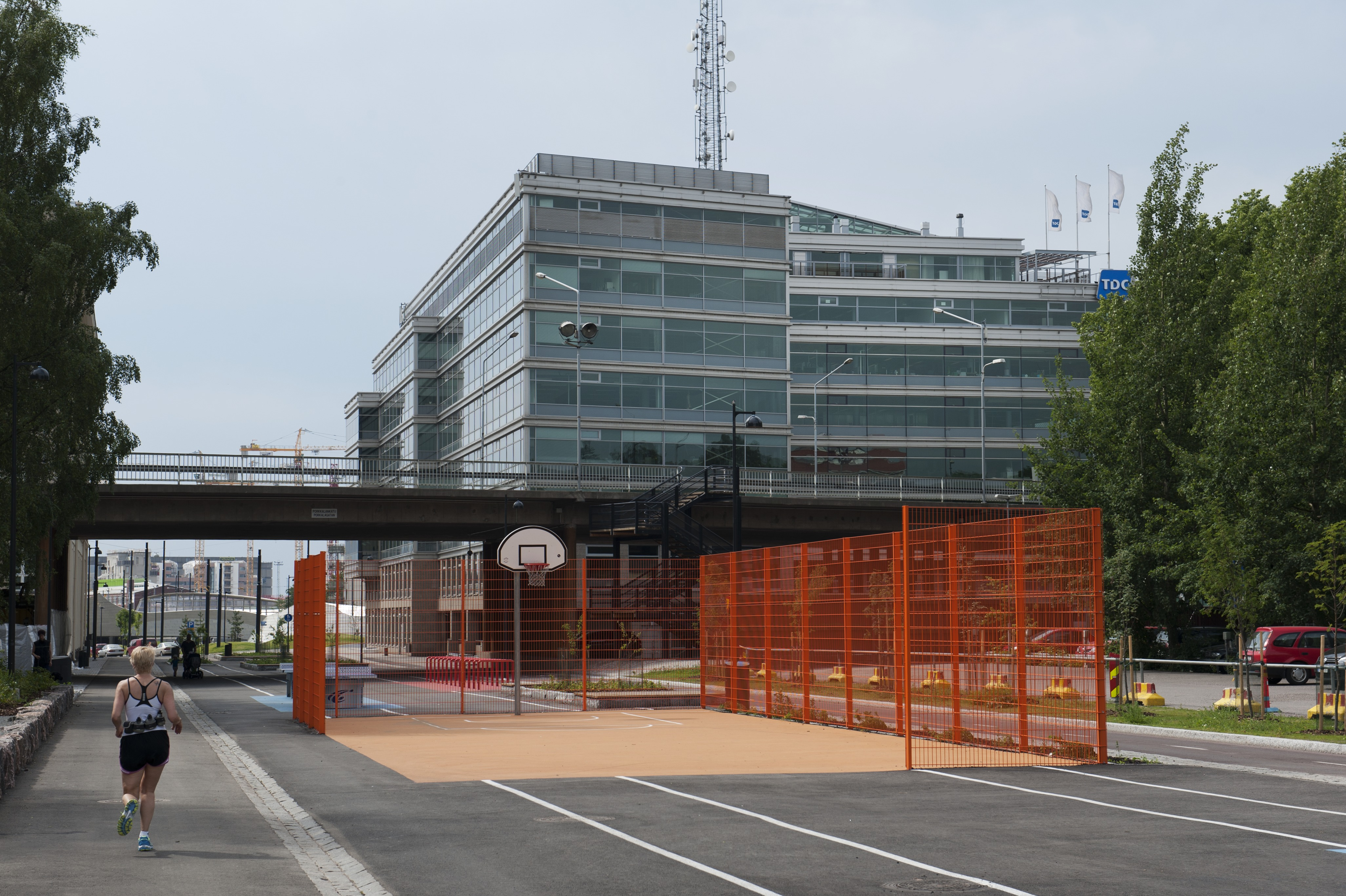
Public basketball court in Baana

=== Men ===
Tier	League
1	Korisliiga; 12 teams
2	I-divisioona; 12 teams

National cup
Finnish Cup

=== Women ===
Tier	League
1	Naisten Korisliiga; 9 teams
2	Naisten I-divisioona; 16 teams

National cup
Women's Finnish Cup
