= Kalevi Heinänen =

Finnish basketball player (1927–2008)

Personal information
- Nationality: Finnish
- Born: 13 March 1927; Helsinki, Finland
- Died: 27 June 2008 (aged 81); Helsinki, Finland

Sport
- Sport: Basketball

Kalevi Heinänen (13 March 1927 – 27 June 2008) was a Finnish basketball player. He competed in the men's tournament at the 1952 Summer Olympics.
