= Pertti Laanti =

Finnish basketball player (born 1939)

Personal information
- Nationality: Finnish
- Born: 24 April 1939 (age 86); Turku, Finland

Sport
- Sport: Basketball

Pertti Laanti (born 24 April 1939) is a Finnish basketball player. He competed in the men's tournament at the 1964 Summer Olympics.
