= Tapio Pöyhönen =

Finnish basketball player (1927–2011)

Personal information
- Nationality: Finnish
- Born: 19 November 1927; Helsinki, Finland
- Died: 27 August 2011 (aged 83); Helsinki, Finland

Sport
- Sport: Basketball

Tapio ("Tappari") Pöyhönen (19 November 1927 – 27 August 2011) was a Finnish basketball player. He was born in Helsinki and grew up in Isku. He competed in 1950 World Cup qualifiers in Nice, the 1951 European Championships in Paris, and the men's tournament at the 1952 Summer Olympics in Helsinki. He later served on the Finnish Olympic Committee.
