= Teijo Finneman =

Finnish basketball player (born 1944)

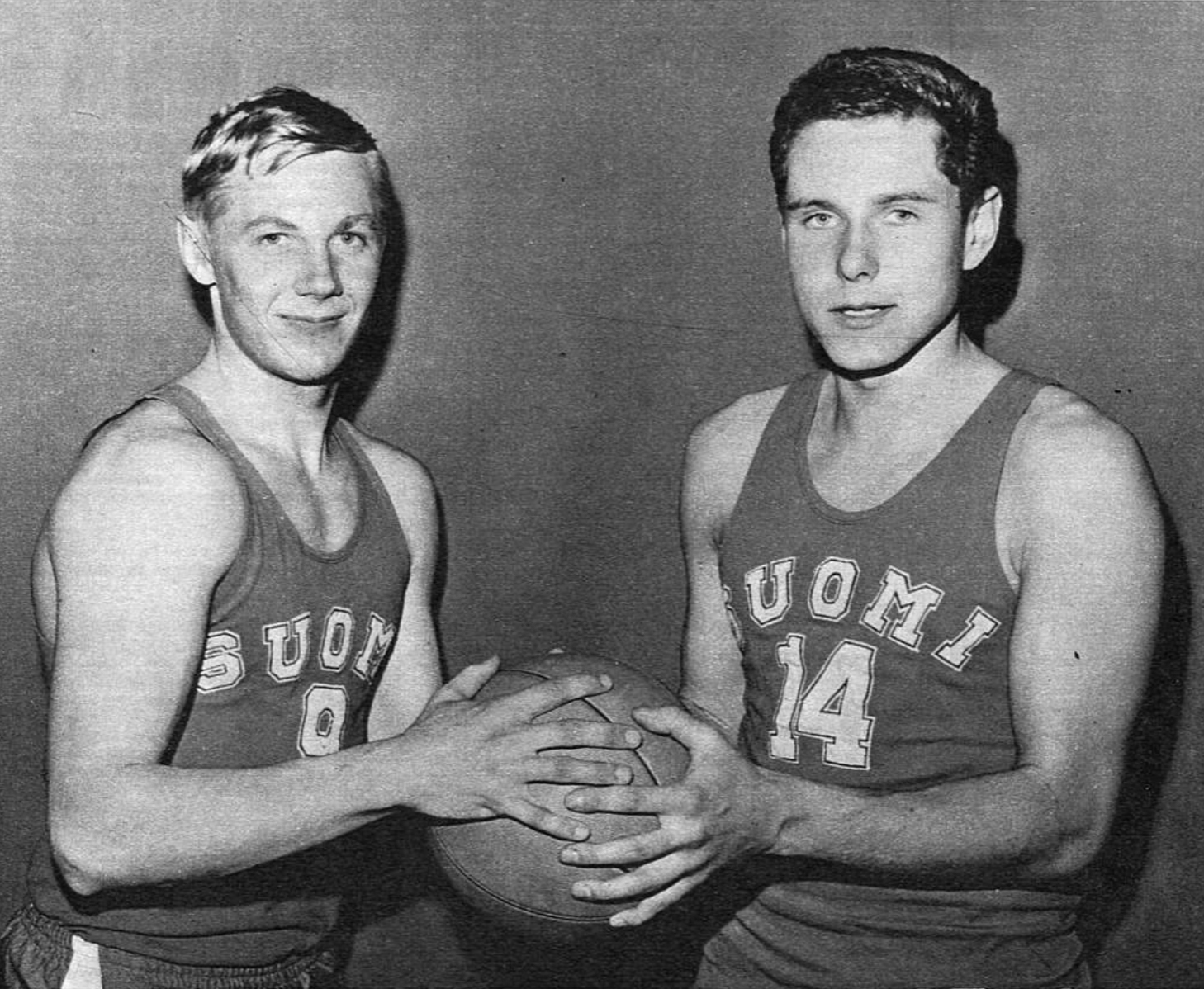

Personal information
- Nationality: Finnish
- Born: 9 September 1944 (age 80); Helsinki, Finland

Sport
- Sport: Basketball

Teijo Finneman (born 9 September 1944) is a Finnish basketball player. He competed in the men's tournament at the 1964 Summer Olympics.
