= Juha Harjula =

Finnish basketball player (1942–2020)

Personal information
- Nationality: Finnish
- Born: 20 June 1942; Helsinki, Finland
- Died: 12 March 2020 (aged 77)

Sport
- Sport: Basketball

Juha Harjula (20 June 1942 – 12 March 2020) was a Finnish basketball player. He competed in the men's tournament at the 1964 Summer Olympics.
