= Pentti Laaksonen =

Finnish basketball player (1929–2005)

Personal information
- Nationality: Finnish
- Born: 13 January 1929; Helsinki, Finland
- Died: 29 April 2005 (aged 76); Montebello, Spain

Sport
- Sport: Basketball

Pentti Laaksonen (13 January 1929 – 29 April 2005) was a Finnish basketball player. He competed in the men's tournament at the 1952 Summer Olympics. Laaksonen lived his last years in Spain.
