= Raimo Vartia =

Finnish basketball player (1937–2018)

Personal information
- Born: 15 January 1937; Helsinki, Finland
- Died: 17 December 2018 (aged 81)
- Listed height: 5 ft 11 in (1.80 m)
- Position: Point guard

Career history
- 1953–1968: Helsingin Kisa-Toverit

Raimo Veikko Vartia (15 January 1937 – 17 December 2018) was a Finnish basketball player. He competed in the men's tournament at the 1964 Summer Olympics.

In addition, Vartia represented Finland in three EuroBasket tournaments (1959, 1961, 1963). Domestically, he won five Finnish championships. Vartia died on 17 December 2018 at 81 years of age.

== Sources ==
- "Raimo Vartia". Finnish Basketball Association.
- "National Team Statistics". Finnish Basketball Association.
