= Oiva Virtanen =

Finnish basketball player (1929–1992)

Personal information
- Nationality: Finnish
- Born: 5 August 1929; Helsinki, Finland
- Died: 26 September 1992 (aged 63); Helsinki, Finland

Sport
- Sport: Basketball

Oiva Virtanen (5 August 1929 – 26 September 1992) was a Finnish basketball player. He competed in the men's tournament at the 1952 Summer Olympics.
