= Raimo Lindholm =

Finnish basketball player (1931–2017)

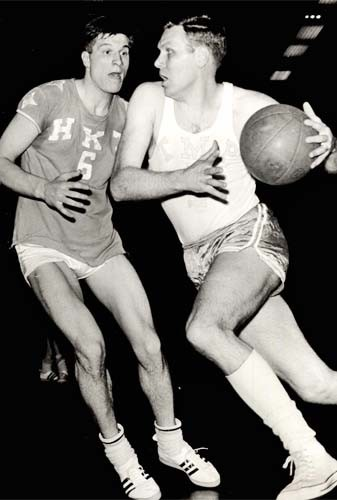

Personal information
- Nationality: Finnish
- Born: 17 November 1931; Helsinki, Finland
- Died: 20 November 2017 (aged 86)

Sport
- Sport: Basketball

Raimo Lindholm (17 November 1931 – 20 November 2017) was a Finnish basketball player. He competed in the men's tournament at the 1952 Summer Olympics and the 1964 Summer Olympics, the only Finnish basketball player to do so. He was the first player to earn more than 100 caps for the Finland national basketball team.
