= Pertti Mutru =

Finnish basketball player (1930–1964)

Personal information
- Nationality: Finnish
- Born: 18 September 1930 Viipuri, Finland
- Died: 30 October 1964 (aged 34)

Sport
- Sport: Basketball

Pertti Mutru (18 September 1930 – 30 October 1964) was a Finnish basketball player. He competed in the men's tournament at the 1952 Summer Olympics.
