= Aho (name) =

- Language: Finnish

Origin
- Meaning: "glade", from aho ("glade")
- Region of origin: Finland

Other names
- Variant form: Ahonen

Aho is a Finnish Laine type surname meaning "glade". Notable people with the surname include:

- Aimo Aho (1951–2014), Finnish javelin thrower
- Alfred Aho (born 1941), Canadian computer scientist
- Bill Aho (born 1957), American businessman
- Claire Aho (1925–2015), Finnish photographer
- Eero Aho (born 1968), Finnish actor
- Eric Aho (born 1966), American painter
- Esko Aho (born 1954), former prime minister of Finland
- Ethan Aho, American politician
- Heikki Aho (filmmaker) (1895–1961), Finnish film director, of Aho & Soldan film production company
- Heikki Aho (footballer) (born 1983), Finnish footballer
- Joni Aho (born 1986), Finnish footballer
- Juhana Aho (born 1993), Finnish ice hockey player
- Juhani Aho (1861–1921), Finnish writer
- Junior Aho (born 1999), French American football player
- Jussi Halla-aho (born 1983), Finnish politician
- Jussi Hauta-aho, Finnish rapper known as Kube
- Jyrki Aho (born 1974), former Finnish ice hockey player
- Kaarina Aho (1925–1990), Finnish ceramist and designer
- Kalevi Aho (born 1949), Finnish composer
- Matti Aho (1934–1984), Finnish boxer
- Matti Luoma-aho (1885–1943), Finnish politician
- Martti Johannes Aho (1896–1986), Finnish colonel
- Martti Korkia-Aho (1930–2012), Finnish politician
- Ninos Aho (1945–2013), Assyrian poet and activist
- Paavo Aho (1891–1918), Finnish athlete
- Pascal Aho, Beninese sprinter
- Peter Aho, (born 2003), Nigerian cricketer
- Petri Aho, Finnish guitarist
- Raila Aho (born 1937), Finnish politician
- Sebastian Aho, Finnish ice hockey player
- Sebastian Aho (ice hockey, born 1996), Swedish ice hockey player
- Seppo Aho, (born 1944), Finnish pentathlete
- Susan Aho (born 1974), Finnish singer-songwriter and member of Värttinä
- Teppo Hauta-aho (1941–2021), Finnish musician
- Tommy Mansikka-Aho, Finnish musician
- Tuomas Aho (born 1981), Finnish footballer
- Viljo Aho, (1932–2013), Finnish boxer
- Wayne Sulo Aho (1916–2006), American contactee
