= Ahonen =

- Language: Finnish

Origin
- Meaning: derived from aho ("glade") and -nen (surname-derivation suffix)
- Region of origin: Finland

Other names
- Variant form: Aho

Ahonen is a Finnish surname, a Virtanen type derivation from the word aho, "glade". Notable people with the surname include:

- Anders Ahonen, Finnish engineer and diplomat
- Ari Ahonen (born 1981), Finnish professional hockey goalie
- Arvo Ahonen (1918–1991), Finnish politician
- Derek Ahonen (born 1980), Finnish/American Playwright
- Elise Ahonen (born 1960s), Finnish figure skater
- Esko Ahonen (1955–2025), Finnish politician, member of the parliament
- Heidi Ahonen (born 1984), Finnish footballer
- Janne Ahonen (born 1977), Finnish professional and Olympic ski jumper
- Kati Ahonen (born 1966), Finnish ice hockey goaltender
- Kirsi Ahonen (born 1976), Finnish javelin thrower
- Leo Ahonen (born 1944), Finnish rower
- Olavi Ahonen (1923–2000), Finnish film actor
- Olavi Ahonen (basketball) (1941–1995), Finnish basketball player
- Pirjo Ahonen (born 1970), Finnish ice hockey defenseman and bandy player
- Rony Ahonen (born 1987), Finnish ice hockey player
- Roope Ahonen (born 1990), Finnish basketball player
- Veli-Matti Ahonen, Finnish ski jumper
- Ville Ahonen (born 1994), Finnish cross-country skier

== Fictional characters ==
- Mika Ahonen, a character from the anime/manga Strike Witches
