= Korkia =

Korkia is a surname. Notable people with the surname include:

- Martti Korkia-Aho (1930–2012), Finnish businessman and politician
- Mikheil Korkia (1948–2004), Georgian basketball player
- Nastia Korkia (fl. 2013), Russian filmmaker
- Otar Korkia (1923–2005), Georgian basketball player and coach
