= 2018–19 Finnish Basketball Cup =

- Season: 2018–19
- Games played: 27
- Teams: 16
- TV partner(s): Elisa Viihde

Finals
- Champions: Salon Vilpas (1st title)
- Runners-up: Tampereen Pyrintö
- All statistics correct as of 8 January 2019.

The 2018–19 of the Finnish Basketball Cup is at its 33rd edition.

The competition was interrupted in 2013 and resumed for the season 2018–19. The Opening match was played on 30 October 2018.

== Format ==
Every Finnish basketball team from any league could join voluntarily the Finnish Basketball Cup. The competition is structured in single game play-off series, with the exception that the teams that lose at the first and second round have a second chance to qualify by playing an additional play-out round.

== Teams ==
Location of teams in the 2018–19 Finnish Basketball Cup

Team	City	Tier	Affiliation
BC Lepi	Nokia	Over 35 Championship	BC Nokia
Espoo Basket Team	Espoo	I Division B	
Forssan Koripojat	Forssa	I Division A	
Jyväskylä Basketball Academy	Jyväskylä	I Division A	
Koiviston Kipinä	Äänekoski	II Division South East Area	
KTP Basket	Kotka	Korisliiga	
Lahti Basketball	Lahti	I Division A	
LoKoKo Bisons	Loimaa	I Division A	
Munkkiniemen Kisapojat	Helsinki	I Division B	
Porvoon Tarmo	Porvoo	I Division A	
Pyrintö Akatemia	Tampere	I Division A	Tampereen Pyrintö
Tampereen Pyrintö	Tampere	Korisliiga	
Raiders Basket	Järvenpää	I Division B	
Roosters	Nokia	III Division Western Area	BC Nokia
Räppäkäpälät	Porvoo	II Division Southern Area	Porvoon Tarmo
Salon Vilpas	Salo	Korisliiga	

== First round ==
In the first round all the teams qualify to the second round, no matter what the result is. But the winners from the first round play against each other in a single game play-off format, while the losers go in a play-out round.

10 November 2018
17:00

Porvoon Tarmo	99–80	Roosters

9 November 2018
19:30

BC Lepi	98–71	Espoo Basket Team

10 November 2018
14:30

Räppäkäpälät	118–80	Pyrintö Akatemia

2 November 2018
18:30

Tampereen Pyrintö	98–84	LoKoKo Bisons

10 November 2018
12:30

Koiviston Kipinä	83–104	Raiders Basket

21 November 2018
18:30

Lahti Basketball	86–82	KTP Basket

8 November 2018
19:00

Munkkiniemen Kisapojat	80–120	Salon Vilpas

30 October 2018
18:30

Jyväskylä Basketball Academy	81–89	Forssan Koripojat

== Second round ==
The second round play-offs are played amongst the teams that won in the first round. The winning teams go directly to the fourth round, while the losing teams play an extra third round with the chance to qualify to the fourth round.

The play-outs are played amongst the teams that lost the first play off round. The losing teams are out from the competition, while the winning teams play in the additional round against the losing team from the play-offs of the second round, with a chance to qualify to the fourth round.

=== Play off ===
20 December 2018
19:30

Porvoon Tarmo	65–119	BC Lepi

2 December 2018
14:30

Räppäkäpälät	88–136	Tampereen Pyrintö

4 December 2018
19:00

Raiders Basket	99–94	Lahti Basketball

4 December 2018
18:30

Forssan Koripojat	84–109	Salon Vilpas

=== Play out ===
15 December 2018
18:30

Roosters	92–75	Espoo Basket Team

4 December 2018
18:30

LoKoKo Bisons	85–70	Pyrintö Akatemia

8 January 2019
18:30

KTP Basket	138–90	Koiviston Kipinä

4 December 2018
18:30

Jyväskylä Basketball Academy	82–106	Munkkiniemen Kisapojat

== Third round ==
In the third round the teams who won the play-outs play against the teams that lost the second round of play-offs. The winners will qualify to the fourth round and will play against the teams that won the second round of play-offs

9 January 2019
19:00

Munkkiniemen Kisapojat	120–47	Porvoon Tarmo

15 January 2019
18:30

KTP Basket	108–85	Räppäkäpälät

9 January 2019
18:30

LoKoKo Bisons	76–80	Lahti Basketball

20 January 2019
17:00

Forssan Koripojat	103–83	Roosters

== Bracket ==
The final stage is played in single match quarters, semifinals and final.

Quarter-finals
6 February 2019
Raiders Basket	64
Munkkiniemen Kisapojat	68
22 February 2019
Tampereen Pyrintö	115
Forssan Koripojat	90
29 January 2019
Lahti Basketball	102
BC Lepi	83
6 February 2019
Salon Vilpas	98
KTP Basket	86

Semi-finals
5 March 2019
Munkkiniemen Kisapojat	89
Tampereen Pyrintö	99
5 March 2019
Lahti Basketball	79
Salon Vilpas	104

Final
16 March 2019
Tampereen Pyrintö	93
Salon Vilpas	106

== Final ==
16 March 2019 Final	Tampereen Pyrintö	93–106	Salon Vilpas	Tampere
19:00 (EET)	Scoring by quarter: 26–27, 21–25, 23–29, 23–25
Elisa Viihde	Pts: Osku Heinonen 20; Rebs: Kenneth Manigault 8 Asts: Kenneth Manigault 6	Boxscore	Pts: Jack Gibbs 31; Rebs: Juho Nenonen 9 Asts: Teemu Rannikko 5	Arena: Pyynikin Palloiluhalli

Starters:			Pts	Reb	Ast
G	2	(United States) Jaylon Tate	19	3	5
F	3	(United States) Kenneth Manigault	19	8	6
F	10	(Finland) Osku Heinonen	20	4	2
C	65	(United States) Kevin Johnson Jr.	10	8	0
F	93	(Finland) Joonas Cavén	9	0	0
Reserves:					
G	9	(Finland) Lassi Kilpinen	3	0	1
F	11	(Finland) Ville Haapoja	3	2	0
G	13	(Finland) Tuomas Flinck	0	0	0
F	40	(Finland) Justus Kilpinen	10	1	3
Head coach:
(Finland) Sami Toiviainen

Tampereen Pyrintö	Salon Vilpas

Pyrintö	Statistics	Vilpas
26/46 (57%)	2 point field goals	22/42 (52%)
9/21 (43%)	3 point field goals	12/23 (52%)
14/16 (88.0%)	Free throws	26/29 (90%)
29	Rebounds	36
17	Assists	22

Game rules
Game played under FIBA rules.

2018-2019 Finnish Cup Winners

Salon Vilpas
1st title

Starters:			Pts	Reb	Ast
F	7	(Finland) Juho Nenonen	17	9	4
F	8	(United States) Antonio Ballard	25	9	2
G	9	(Finland) Teemu Rannikko	5	0	5
F	10	(United States) Brandon Taylor	8	4	0
G	15	(United States) Jack Gibbs	31	2	2
Reserves:					
F	4	(Finland) Mikko Koivisto	9	3	3
F	5	(Finland) Henri Kantonen	6	4	4
G	11	(Finland) Leevi-Matias Taimela	DNP		
G	12	(Finland) Aatu Kivimäki	0	0	1
F	21	(Finland) Riku Laine	5	0	1
Head coach:
(Finland) Joonas Iisalo
