= Raho =

Raho is a surname. Notable people with the surname include:

- Alessandro Raho (born 1971), British artist
- Pipi Raho (born 1988), Papua New Guinean cricketer
- Slimane Raho (born 1975), Algerian footballer
- Umberto Raho (1922–2016), Italian stage, film, and television actor

== See also ==
- Aho (name)
