= Alajärvi Library =

Library in Finland

- Alajärven kaupunginkirjasto
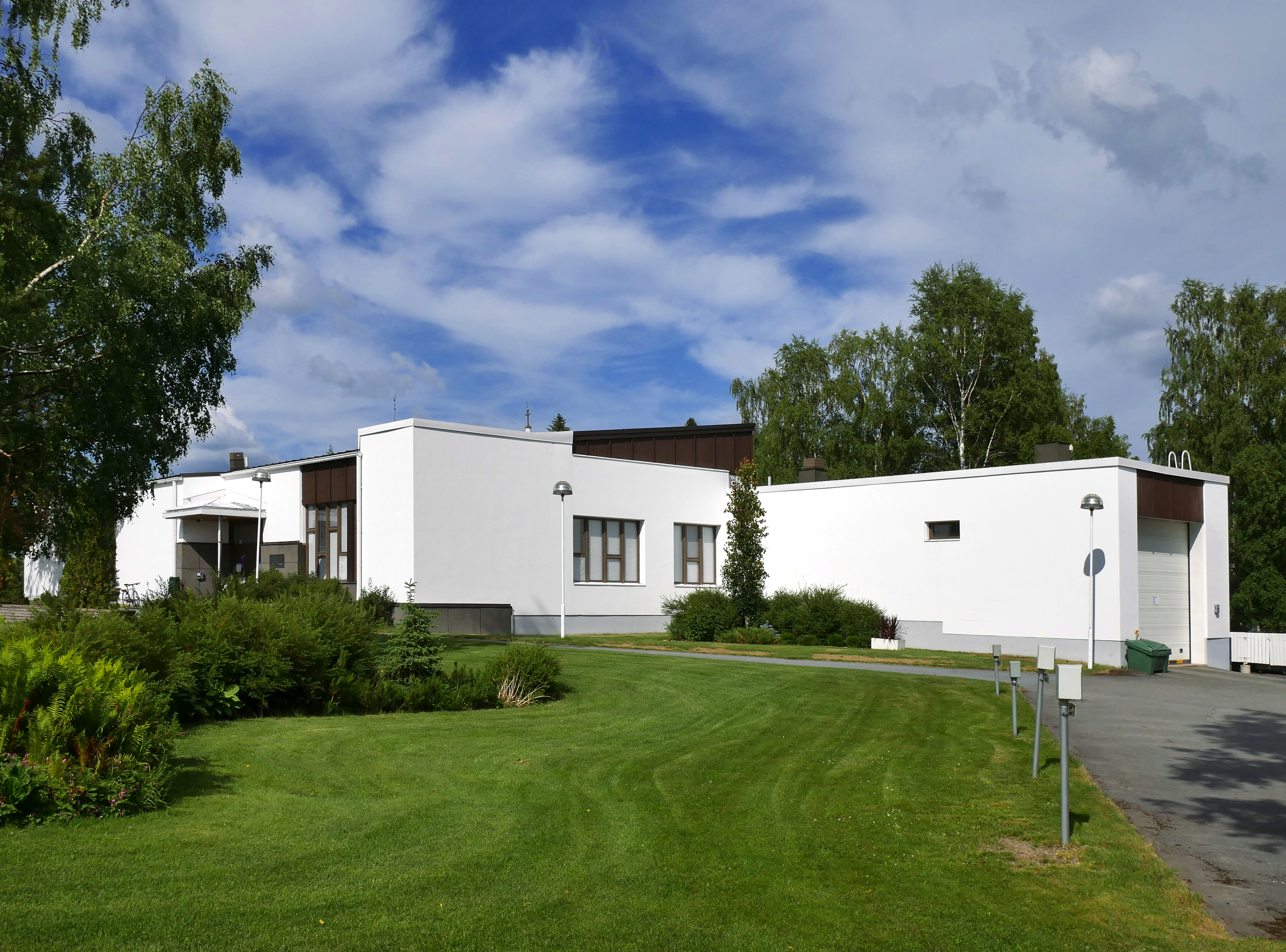
- 62.99914°N 23.82408°E
- Location: Alajärvi, Finland
- Type: Public library
- Established: 1866
- Architects: Alvar Aalto, Elissa Aalto, Heikki Tarkka, Varpu Lönnström

Collection
- Size: 112,000

Other information
- Website: https://www.alajarvi.fi/index.php/en/kirjasto

The Alajärvi Library is the municipal public library of the town of Alajärvi in Finland.

The first public library in Alajärvi was established in 1866, and operated as an adjunct to the Alajärvi Church.

The current library was built in 1991 and opened to public in 1992. It is notable for being based on an original 1966 design by the Finnish architect Alvar Aalto, although it was only completed after his death in 1976 by architects working in the Aalto design bureau. Alajärvi is home to eight buildings designed by Aalto, with the library forming part of the Aalto-designed public and administrative buildings complex.

== See also ==
- Alajärvi administrative centre
- List of libraries in Finland
