= Valtteri Mervola =

Finnish basketball player (born 2002)

Tampereen Pyrintö
- Position: Point guard
- League: Korisliiga

Personal information
- Born: 12 January 2002 (age 24) Finland
- Listed height: 1.85 m (6 ft 1 in)
- Listed weight: 79 kg (174 lb)

Career information
- Playing career: 2019–present

Career history
- 2019–2022: Kataja
- 2022–2023: Tapiolan Honka
- 2023–2024: Ehingen Urspring
- 2024–present: Tampereen Pyrintö

Valtteri Mervola (born 12 January 2002) is a Finnish professional basketball player who plays as a point guard for Tampereen Pyrintö in the Korisliiga.

== Career ==
Mervola started playing basketball with Kataja in Joensuu. He debuted with the first team in top-tier Korisliiga in March 2019, when aged 17. After one season with Tapiolan Honka, he signed with Ehingen Urspring in German ProB for the 2023–24 season. After a season in Germany, he returned to Finland and signed with Tampereen Pyrintö.

== National team career ==
Mervola has played for Finland U16, U18 and U20 national teams.
