= Trey Niemi =

Finnish basketball player (born 1998)

No. 2 – Helsinki Seagulls
- Position: Point guard
- League: Korisliiga

Personal information
- Born: 21 March 1998 (age 28) Finland
- Listed height: 1.85 m (6 ft 1 in)

Career information
- Playing career: 2016–present

Career history
- 2016–2017: Pussihukat
- 2017–2021: Ura Basket
- 2021–2022: Salon Vilpas
- 2022–2023: Korihait
- 2023: Saskatchewan Rattlers
- 2023: Basket Lumezzane
- 2023–2024: Tampereen Pyrintö
- 2024–2025: KTP Basket
- 2025: Bisbal Bàsquet
- 2025–present: Helsinki Seagulls

Career highlights
- Korisliiga Rookie of the Year (2019); Korisliiga Most Improved Player (2023)

Trey Niemi (born 21 March 1998) is a Finnish professional basketball player who plays as a point guard for Helsinki Seagulls in Finnish Korisliiga.

== Early life ==
Niemi was born to a Finnish mother and an English father, James Roberts, a dancer, dance teacher and personal trainer, who was born in England to Jamaican-born parents.
