= Kyle Fogg =

American basketball player

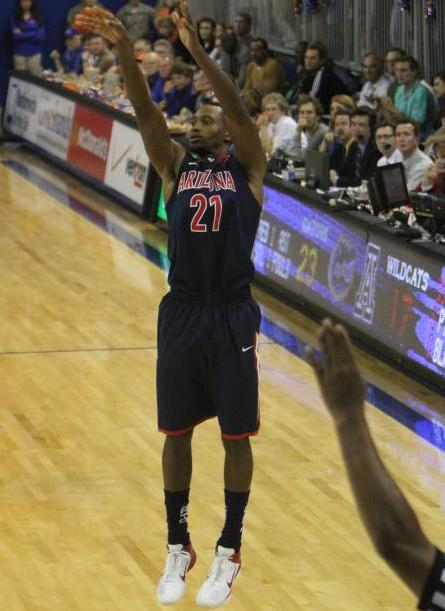

No. 12 – Guangdong Southern Tigers
- Position: Point guard
- League: CBA

Personal information
- Born: January 27, 1990 (age 36) Brea, California, U.S.
- Listed height: 6 ft 3 in (1.91 m)
- Listed weight: 188 lb (85 kg)

Career information
- High school: Brea Olinda (Brea, California)
- College: Arizona (2008–2012)
- NBA draft: 2012: undrafted
- Playing career: 2012–present

Career history
- 2012–2013: Rio Grande Valley Vipers
- 2013–2014: Lapuan Korikobrat
- 2014–2015: Antwerp Giants
- 2015–2016: Eisbären Bremerhaven
- 2016–2017: Unicaja
- 2017–2019: Guangzhou Long-Lions
- 2019–2020: Beijing Royal Fighters
- 2021–2025: Liaoning Flying Leopards
- 2025–2026: Shanghai Sharks
- 2026–present: Guangdong Southern Tigers

Career highlights
- 3× CBA champion (2022–2024); CBA Club Cup champion (2026); CBA Finals MVP (2024); EuroCup champion (2017); CBA All-International Team (2023); All-EuroCup Second Team (2017); Bundesliga scoring champion (2016); Korisliiga MVP (2014); Korisliiga scoring champion (2014); NBA D-League champion (2013); First-team All-Pac-12 (2012)

Kyle Edward Fogg (born January 27, 1990) is an American professional basketball player for the Guangdong Southern Tigers of the Chinese Basketball Association (CBA). He played college basketball for the Arizona Wildcats.

== Professional career ==
After going undrafted in the 2012 NBA draft, Fogg joined the Houston Rockets for the 2012 NBA Summer League. On September 25, 2012, he signed with the Rockets, but was later waived on October 12. In November 2012, he was acquired by the Rio Grande Valley Vipers of the NBA Development League as an affiliate player.

On September 30, 2013, Fogg signed with the Denver Nuggets. However, he was later waived on October 16. In December 2013, he signed with Lapuan Korikobrat of Finland for the rest of the 2013–14 Korisliiga season, going on to earn league MVP honors after averaging 27.0 points and 6.4 rebounds in 29 games.

On June 11, 2014, Fogg signed with the Antwerp Giants of Belgium for the 2014–15 season.

In September 2015, Fogg signed with Eisbären Bremerhaven in Germany.

In June 2016, Fogg signed with Unicaja Málaga of the Spanish Liga ACB. In April 2017, Fogg won the EuroCup with Unicaja after beating Valencia BC in the Finals.

On July 4, 2017, Fogg signed with the Guangzhou Long-Lions of the Chinese Basketball Association. He re-signed with the team on July 2, 2018.

On August 15, 2019, Fogg signed with Beijing Royal Fighters, and left the team after the season.

In 2021, Fogg joined Liaoning Flying Leopards for the rest of the 2020–21 season, the signing was officially announced in April. He extended the contract with the team for the 2021–22 season.

On May 22, 2024, Fogg and Liaoning won their third consecutive CBA championship after defeating Xinjiang Flying Tigers in the finals. Fogg was named the CBA Finals Most Valuable Player.

== The Basketball Tournament ==
Fogg joined the inaugural Overseas Elite roster for The Basketball Tournament (TBT) during the summer of 2015. Overseas Elite defeated Team 23 in the TBT 2015 championship game, 67–65, to claim the $1 million prize.

Overseas Elite and Fogg repeated as champions in August 2016, winning TBT 2016 with a 77–72 victory over Team Colorado, earning them another $2 million. In six games, Fogg averaged 21.8 points per game, and was subsequently named tournament MVP and a member of the All-Tournament team.

In August 2017, Fogg and Overseas Elite again returned as champions, winning TBT 2017 with an 86–83 victory over Team Challenge ALS, televised on ESPN. Fogg finished with a game-high 29 points, and received MVP and All-Tournament honors for the second straight year.

As of August 2018, Fogg and Overseas Elite won the TBT 2018.

== Career statistics ==
Legend
GP	Games played	GS	Games started	MPG	Minutes per game
FG%	Field goal percentage	3P%	3-point field goal percentage	FT%	Free throw percentage
RPG	Rebounds per game	APG	Assists per game	SPG	Steals per game
BPG	Blocks per game	PPG	Points per game	**Bold**	Career high

=== College ===
Year	Team	GP	GS	MPG	FG%	3P%	FT%	RPG	APG	SPG	BPG	PPG
2008–09	Arizona	35	27	24.1	**.450**	.383	.786	2.5	1.7	0.9	0.1	6.1
2009–10	Arizona	31	24	28.8	.415	.417	.755	3.1	2.2	0.9	0.3	11.1
2010–11	Arizona	**38**	**34**	25.5	.373	.355	.747	1.8	**2.6**	0.8	0.2	8.1
2011–12	Arizona	35	**34**	**32.1**	.420	**.444**	**.789**	**3.7**	2.2	**1.1**	**0.4**	**13.5**
Career		139	119	27.5	.411	.404	.771	2.8	2.2	0.9	0.2	9.6

=== G League ===
==== Regular season ====
Year	Team	GP	GS	MPG	FG%	3P%	FT%	RPG	APG	SPG	BPG	PPG
2012–13	Rio Grande	37	10	18.0	.368	.336	.805	2.6	1.6	0.8	0.1	6.4
Career		37	10	18.0	.368	.336	.805	2.6	1.6	0.8	0.1	6.4

==== Playoffs ====
Year	Team	GP	GS	MPG	FG%	3P%	FT%	RPG	APG	SPG	BPG	PPG
2012–13	Rio Grande	6	0	10.1	.222	.333	.778	1.0	0.8	0.8	0.2	2.2
Career		6	0	10.1	.222	.333	.778	1.0	0.8	0.8	0.2	2.2

=== European leagues ===
Year	Team	GP	GS	MPG	FG%	3P%	FT%	RPG	APG	SPG	BPG	PPG	PIR
2014–15 EuroChallenge	(Belgium) Antwerp Giants	12	12	31.9	.446	.438	.755	3.2	2.8	0.9	0.2	16.4	-
2016–17 EuroCup	(Spain) Unicaja Malaga	22	9	19.7	.481	.415	.754	3.0	2.4	0.8	0.0	11.9	-

==== Domestic leagues ====
Year	Team	League	GP	MPG	FG%	3P%	FT%	RPG	APG	SPG	BPG	PPG
2013-14	(Finland) Kobrat	Korisliiga	29	37.4	.481	.397	.842	6.4	4.6	1.3	0.2	27.0
2014-15	(Belgium) Antwerp Giants	PBL	29	29.4	.420	.388	.820	3.4	2.4	1.1	0.2	16.5
2015-16	(Germany) Bremerhaven	Basketball Bundesliga	34	29.8	.421	.357	.897	3.6	3.3	1.0	0.1	18.2
2016-17	(Spain) Unicaja Malaga	ACB	32	16.1	.471	.447	.849	2.4	2.2	0.8	0.1	10.2

==== Domestic Playoffs ====
Year	Team	League	GP	MPG	FG%	3P%	FT%	RPG	APG	SPG	BPG	PPG
2014-15	(Belgium) Antwerp Giants	PBL	3	22.3	.200	.111	.750	2.0	1.3	1.0	0.0	4.7
2016-17	(Spain) Unicaja Malaga	ACB	5	11.6	.333	.333	.750	1.2	1.4	0.4	0.0	4.0

=== CBA statistics ===
==== Regular season ====
Year	Team	GP	GS	MPG	FG%	3P%	FT%	RPG	APG	SPG	BPG	PPG
2017-18	Guangzhou	21	21	**41.5**	.452	.382	.857	6.0	5.6	1.8	0.1	**35.6**
2018-19	Guangzhou	45	**44**	39.1	.471	.387	.868	**8.4**	**7.6**	2.1	0.4	34.4
2019-20	Beijing	42	42	36.5	.478	.367	.852	6.3	6.3	**3.0**	0.3	34.4
2020-21	Liaoning	5	0	19.8	.472	**.435**	**.921**	3.8	5.8	2.0	0.2	19.0
2021-22	Liaoning	31	30	25.1	**.516**	.399	.866	3.9	2.8	2.3	0.5	19.4
2022-23	Liaoning	40	37	28.2	.449	.383	.819	5.1	3.7	2.1	**0.6**	21.1
2023-24	Liaoning	**51**	7	24.3	.421	.361	.846	3.6	3.9	1.5	0.4	19.4
2024-25	Liaoning	41	30	32.2	.473	.391	.850	4.9	4.0	1.4	0.4	23.2
Career		276	211	31.6	.464	.381	.854	5.4	4.9	2.0	0.4	25.0

==== Playoffs ====
Year	Team	GP	GS	MPG	FG%	3P%	FT%	RPG	APG	SPG	BPG	PPG
2017-18	Guangzhou	2	2	**44.0**	.467	**.476**	.800	3.5	6.0	2.0	0.0	**38.0**
2019-20	Beijing	2	2	39.5	.426	.063	**.879**	4.5	**7.0**	**4.0**	**0.5**	35.0
2020-21	Liaoning	6	6	27.9	.397	.227	.870	**6.0**	3.2	1.8	0.3	17.0
2021-22	Liaoning	9	**9**	19.8	**.511**	.333	.759	3.0	1.1	1.6	0.3	13.8
2022-23	Liaoning	11	7	24.3	.441	.416	.828	4.5	2.5	1.5	0.4	20.6
2023-24	Liaoning	**12**	2	23.8	.438	.394	.838	3.9	2.9	1.7	0.3	18.8
Career		42	28	25.5	.447	.362	.835	4.2	2.8	1.8	0.3	19.6

Source: basketball-stats.de (Date: 27. March 2022)
