= Antero Lehto =

Finnish basketball player (born 1984)

No. 4 – Tampereen Pyrintö
- Position: Point guard
- League: Korisliiga

Personal information
- Born: 2 April 1984 (age 42) Tampere, Finland
- Listed height: 6 ft 1 in (1.85 m)
- Listed weight: 188 lb (85 kg)

Career information
- NBA draft: 2006: undrafted
- Playing career: 2000–present

Career history
- 2000–2006: Tampereen Pyrintö/Pyrbasket
- 2006–2007: Korihait
- 2007–2015: Tampereen Pyrintö
- 2015: Varese
- 2015–2020: Tampereen Pyrintö
- 2020–2023: Nokia
- 2023–2025: Tampereen Pyrintö

Career highlights
- 3x Finnish Korisliiga champion (2010, 2011, 2014); Korisliiga MVP (2014); Korisliiga Defensive Player of the Year (2012); Korisliiga Most Improved Player (2004, 2014)

Antero Juhani Lehto (born 2 April 1984) is a Finnish basketball player. 185 cm tall point guard Lehto plays for Tampereen Pyrintö in Korisliiga. Alongside Finnish competitions, Lehto has represented Pyrintö in EuroChallenge and Baltic Basketball League.

Lehto won Finnish championship with Tampereen Pyrintö in 2010, 2011 and 2014. Moreover, he has achieved Finnish cup championship in 2013, cup silver medal in 2009 and 2012 and Korisliiga bronze medal in 2009. Lehto was elected Korisliiga's Player of the Year in 2014, Defensive player of the Year in 2012 and Most developed player of the Year in 2004 and 2014. In 2014 he was elected first time in Finland's national team rink.

== Trophies and awards ==
- Korisliiga's Player of the Year in 2014
- Korisliiga's Defensive player of the Year in 2012
- Korisliiga's Most Developed Player of the Year in 2004 and 2014
- Finnish Championship in 2010, 2011 and 2014
  - Bronze in 2009
- Finnish Cup in 2013
- Finnish Cup runner-up in 2009 and 2012
- Baltic League: Fourth in 2014

== Career statistics ==
=== National team ===
Team	Tournament	Pos.	GP	PPG	RPG	APG
Finland	2014 FIBA World Cup	22nd	3	0.0	0.0	0.0
