= Ura Basket =

- Nickname: Ura
- Leagues: Korisliiga
- Founded: 2005; 20 years ago
- Arena: Kupittaan palloiluhalli
- Capacity: 3,760
- Location: Kaarina, Finland
- Head coach: Kristian Palotie
- Website: urabasket.fi
Home	Away

Ura Basket, also known as Ura, is a basketball club based in Kaarina, Finland. The club made its debut in the top tier Korisliiga in 2018, after winning the First Division championship.

== Honours ==
First Division

- Winners (1): 2017–18

== Notable players ==
- Set a club record or won an individual award as a professional player.
- Played at least one official international match for his senior national team at any time.

- (Finland) Fiifi Aidoo
- (Finland) Trey Niemi
