= Pieti Poikola =

Finnish basketball coach (born 1977)

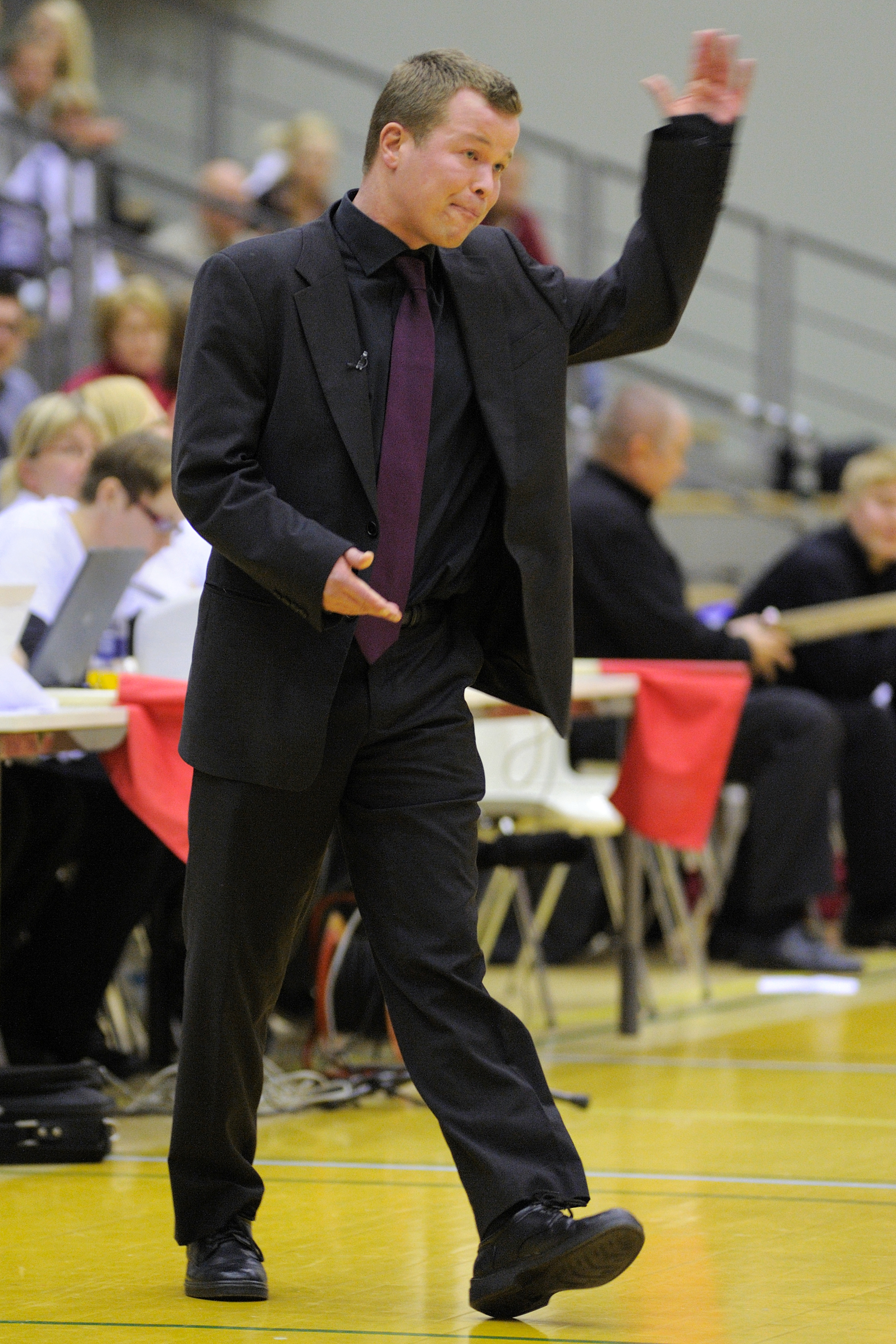
- Poikola coaching Tampereen Pyrintö in 2011

Košice Wolves
- Position: Head coach
- League: Slovak Basketball League

Personal information
- Born: 5 December 1977 (age 48) Oulu, Finland
- Coaching career: 1998–present

Career history

Coaching
- 1998–2002: Tampereen Pyrintö (women)
- 2003–2004: Aura Basket
- 2004–2005: Turun Riento (women)
- 2005–2006: FoKoPo
- 2007–2008: Turun NMKY
- 2008–2015: Tampereen Pyrintö
- 2013–2016: Denmark
- 2015: Tindastóll
- 2016–2017: Kouvot
- 2017: Finland Universiade
- 2020–2022: Lahti Basketball
- 2024–2025: Lučenec
- 2025–: Košice Wolves

Career highlights
- As head coach: 3x Korisliiga champion (2010, 2011, 2014); 3x Korisliiga Coach of the Year (2010, 2011, 2014)

Pieti Ilari Poikola (born 5 December 1977) is a Finnish basketball coach. He is currently working as the head coach of Košice Wolves in Slovak Basketball League.

== Coaching career ==
Poikola has won three Finnish championship titles as the head coach of Tampereen Pyrintö.

Between 2013 and 2016, he was the head coach of the Denmark men's national basketball team. In 2015, a fellow Finnish coach Harri Mannonen joined him as an assistant coach.

In 2015, Poikola was named the head coach of Tindastóll in Úrvalsdeild karla, becoming the first Finnish coach in the Icelandic league. Mannonen followed him to Iceland. Poikola was fired after four games with a record of two wins and two losses. The reason for sacking was that his coaching style was too demanding for a semi-professional team and the players couldn't adjust to the changing of the training culture.

In 2016, he returned to Finland and was appointed the head coach of Kouvot in Korisliiga. After Kouvot were eliminated in the play-offs, Poikola announced he will not continue with the team next season, but left to India to yoga. In August 2017, he coached Finland Universiade team at the 2017 Summer Universiade tournament in Taipei, Taiwan, where Finland team finished in 7th place.

Poikola had a hiatus from coaching until 2020. He travelled in Uganda, Myanmar, Indonesia, India and Sri Lanka concentrating on his mind control by meditations. He returned to coaching in 2020 as the head coach of Korisliiga team Lahti Basketball. He was sacked on 21 November 2022 after a five-game losing streak.

On 4 June 2024, Poikola moved to Slovakia after he was named the head coach of BKM Lučenec in Slovak Basketball League.

On 27 June 2025, Poikola was named the head coach of Košice Wolves in Slovak Basketball League.

== Personal life ==
Poikola is a Master of Science by education.

In the 2011 Finnish parliamentary election, Poikola was a candidate for the Green League but was not elected.

Poikola has been married since late 2013.
