= Eino Ojajärvi =

Finnish politician

Eino Ojajärvi (22 November 1911, Alajärvi - 14 April 1992) was a Finnish Lutheran clergyman and politician. He was a member of the Parliament of Finland, representing the People's Party of Finland from 1962 to 1965 and the Liberal People's Party from 1965 to 1966. He was later active in the Finnish Christian League.
