= 2013–14 Korisliiga season =

2013-14 Korisliiga season - Finnish professional basketball championship

Korisliiga
- Season: 2013–14
- Games played: 44
- Teams: 12

Regular season
- Top seed: Tampereen Pyrintö
- Season MVP: (Finland) Antero Lehto (United States) Kyle Fogg

Finals
- Champions: Tampereen Pyrintö (3rd title)
- Runners-up: Kataja
- Third place: Nilan Bisons Loimaa
- Fourth place: KTP
- Finals MVP: (United States) Damon Williams

Awards
- Defensive Player: (Finland) Tuukka Kotti
- Rookie of the Year: (Finland) Anton Odabasi
- Coach of the Year: (Finland) Pieti Poikola
- Sixth Man: (Finland) Ville Mäkäläinen
- Most Improved: (Finland) Antero Lehto

Statistical leaders
Points	(United States) Kyle Fogg	27.0
Rebounds	(Finland) Ville Kaunisto	10.6
Assists	(United States) Sharaud Curry	6.1

Records
- Highest attendance: 4,557; Pyrintö 81–62 Kataja
- Average attendance: 862 ▲
- All statistics correct as of 12 September 2014.

The 2013–14 Korisliiga season was the 74th season of the Finnish national championship named Korisliiga, the highest professional basketball league in Finland. The defending champion was Bisons Loimaa. Kyle Fogg was both scoring champion and league MVP, while Antero Lehto was named Player of the Year. Tampereen Pyrintö took the title, its third in history.

== Regular season ==
Pos	Team	Pld	W	L	PF	PA	PD	Qualification or relegation
1	Tampereen Pyrintö	44	38	6	3916	3339	+577	Playoffs
2	Nilan Bisons	44	37	7	3948	3035	+913	Playoffs
3	Joensuun Kataja	44	32	12	3737	3300	+437	Playoffs
4	KTP-Basket	44	25	19	3791	3561	+230	Playoffs
5	Kauhajoen Karhu	44	23	21	3508	3588	−80	Playoffs
6	Tapiolan Honka	44	20	24	3664	3695	−31	Playoffs
7	Kouvot	44	19	25	3714	3817	−103	Playoffs
8	Namika Lahti	44	19	25	3412	3598	−186	Playoffs
9	Salon Vilpas	44	17	27	3382	3449	−67	
10	Korikobrat	44	16	28	3527	3859	−332	
11	Lappeenrannan NMKY	44	12	32	3317	3660	−343	
12	Korihait	44	6	38	3462	4027	−565	Relegation to I Division A

== Playoffs ==
Quarterfinals
1	Tampereen Pyrintö	3
8	Namika Lahti	1
4	KTP-Basket	3
5	Kauhajoen Karhu	1
2	Nilan Bisons	3
7	Kouvot	1
3	Joensuun Kataja	3
6	Tapiolan Honka	0

Semifinals
1	Tampereen Pyrintö	3
4	KTP-Basket	2
2	Nilan Bisons	2
3	Joensuun Kataja	3

Finals
1	Tampereen Pyrintö	3
3	Joensuun Kataja	1
Third place
2	Nilan Bisons	1
4	KTP-Basket	0

== Awards ==
- Most Valuable Player:
  - Domestic Player: (Finland) Antero Lehto
  - Foreign Player: (United States) Kyle Fogg
- Finals MVP: (United States) Damon Williams
- Defensive Player: (Finland) Tuukka Kotti
- Rookie of the Year: (Finland) Anton Odabasi
- Most Improved Player: (Finland) Antero Lehto
- Sixth Man of the Year: (Finland) Ville Mäkäläinen
- Coach of the Year: (Finland) Pieti Poikola
- Referee of the Year: (Finland) Petri Mäntylä
