= Anton Odabasi =

Finnish-Turkish basketball player

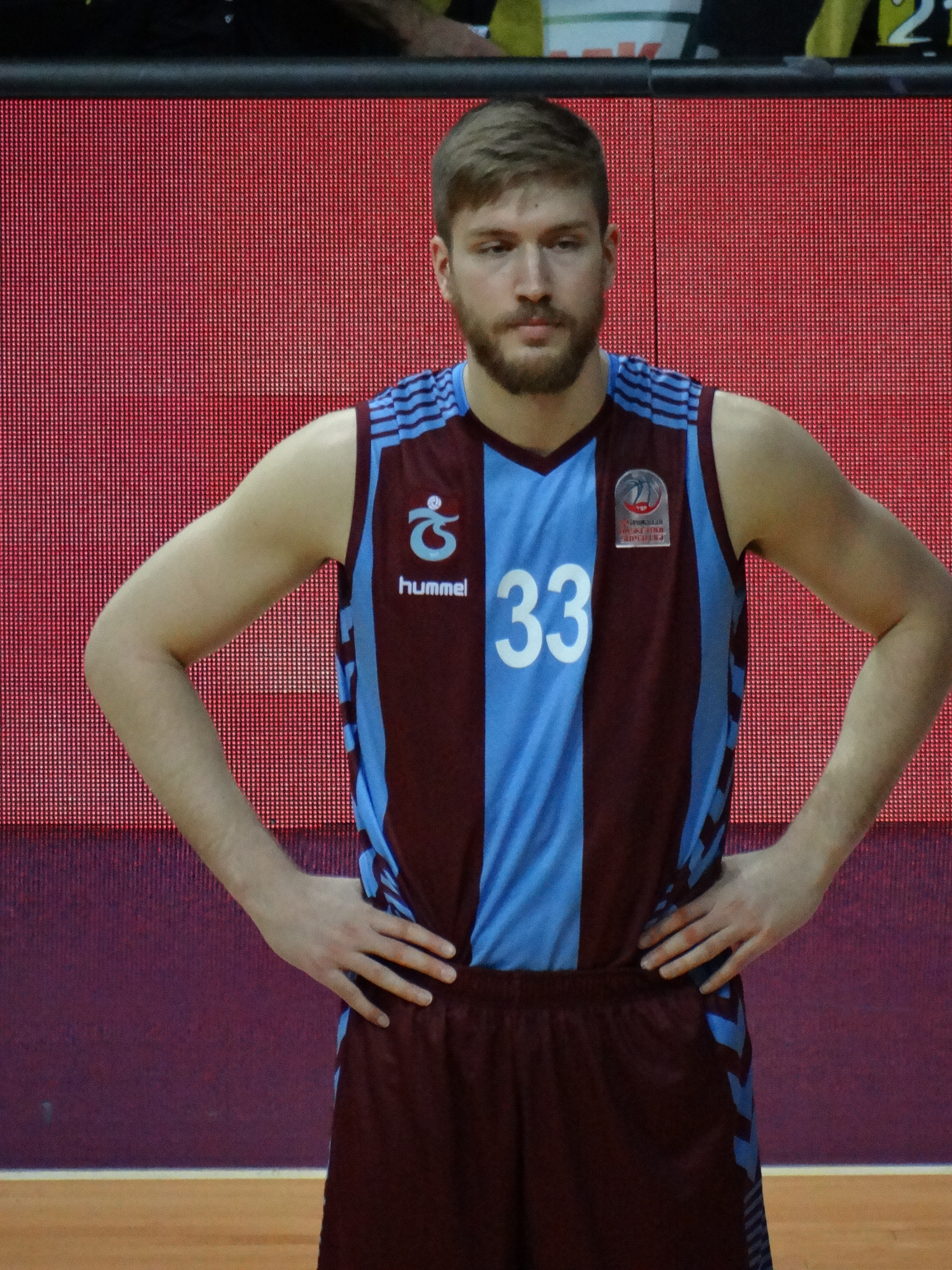

Personal information
- Born: August 8, 1995 (age 31) Espoo, Finland
- Listed height: 6 ft 10 in (2.08 m)
- Listed weight: 230 lb (104 kg)

Career information
- NBA draft: 2017: undrafted
- Playing career: 2012–2018
- Position: Power forward

Career history
- 2012–2013: Fenerbahçe
- 2013–2015: Tapiolan Honka
- 2015: Helsinki Seagulls
- 2015–2016: Denizli Basket
- 2016–2018: Trabzonspor

Career highlights
- Finnish League Rookie of the Year (2014); FIBA Europe Under-20 Championship Division B MVP (2015)

Ozan Anton Odabasi (Turkish: Odabaşı; born 8 August 1995) is a Finnish-Turkish former professional basketball player.

Odabasi grew up with the Tapiolan Honka. He moved to Fenerbahçe Ülker in summer 2012 but in 2013 he returned to Honka. He was named Korisliiga Rookie of the Year in season 2013–14, finishing with averages of 8,0 points and 3,9 rebounds per game.

He played in the Adidas Nations tournament for Team Europe in Los Angeles, 2012. He averaged 13,8 points and 8,5 rebounds per game.

Odabasi transferred from Tapiolan Honka to Helsinki Seagulls during the 2014–15 season of Korisliiga. He played 12 games in Honka before the transfer, averaging 13,3 points and 6,8 rebounds per game.

In the summer of 2018, Odabasi became a free agent after his contract expired. Despite receiving offers, he chose to take a year away from professional basketball to consider his future.

In the summer of 2019, he announced his retirement, stating that a professional basketball career did not align with his personal values.

== Finnish national team ==
He has been member of the Finnish Under-16, Under-18 and Under-20 national team. He scored team high 15,7 points per game in 2011 European U-16 Championship. Playing for Finland, Odabasi was named MVP of the FIBA Europe Under-20 Championship Division B held in 2015, where he averaged 17.7 points and 9.4 rebounds per game.

== Personal life ==
He has a Finnish mother and Turkish father.
