= Osku Heinonen =

Finnish basketball player (born 1992)

No. 10 – Helsinki Seagulls
- Position: Forward
- League: Korisliiga

Personal information
- Born: 4 September 1992 (age 34) Tampere, Finland
- Listed height: 6 ft 4.5 in (1.94 m)
- Listed weight: 210 lb (95 kg)

Career information
- Playing career: 2009–present

Career history
- 2009–2016: Tampereen Pyrintö
- 2010–2011: →BC Nokia
- 2011–2014: →Tampereen Pyrintö II
- 2016–2017: Kouvot
- 2017–2023: Tampereen Pyrintö
- 2023–2024: Haukar
- 2024: San Giobbe
- 2024–2025: JuveCaserta
- 2025–present: Helsinki Seagulls

Career highlights
- Korisliiga champion (2014)

Osku Simana Heinonen (born 4 September 1992) is a Finnish basketball player for Helsinki Seagulls of the Finnish Korisliiga. In 2014, he won the Finnish championship with Tampereen Pyrintö. Alongside Finnish competitions, Heinonen represented Pyrintö in EuroChallenge and Baltic Basketball League. He has also represented Pyrintö's reserve team and Kouvot.

== Club career ==
Heinonen injured his knee in February 2014 and therefore missed the end of the season.

Pyrintö achieved national silver medals in 2016 losing to Kouvot at the finals. In June 2016 Heinonen signed a one-year contract with Kouvot. In June 2017 he returned to Pyrintö.

In June 2023, Heinonen signed with Haukar of the Icelandic Úrvalsdeild karla. On 26 October, he scored 29 points, including nine three pointers, in a win against Hamar.

On 24 March 2024, Heinonen signed with San Giobbe of the Italian Serie A2.

On 27 July 2024, Heinonen signed with JuveCaserta of the Italian Serie B.

== National team career ==
Heinonen has played for Finland's national youth teams.

== Trophies and awards ==
- Finnish Championship 2014
  - Runner-up 2016
- Finnish Cup runner-up 2012
- Fourth place in Baltic League 2014

== Personal life ==
Heinonen grew up in Hallila, Tampere. He studied computer science at the University of Tampere and is married.

Heinonen was diagnosed with type 1 diabetes before he turned one year old and has spoken publicly about controlling diabetes in the life of a top athlete.
