= Alajärvi =

- Town
- Alajärven kaupunki Alajärvi stad
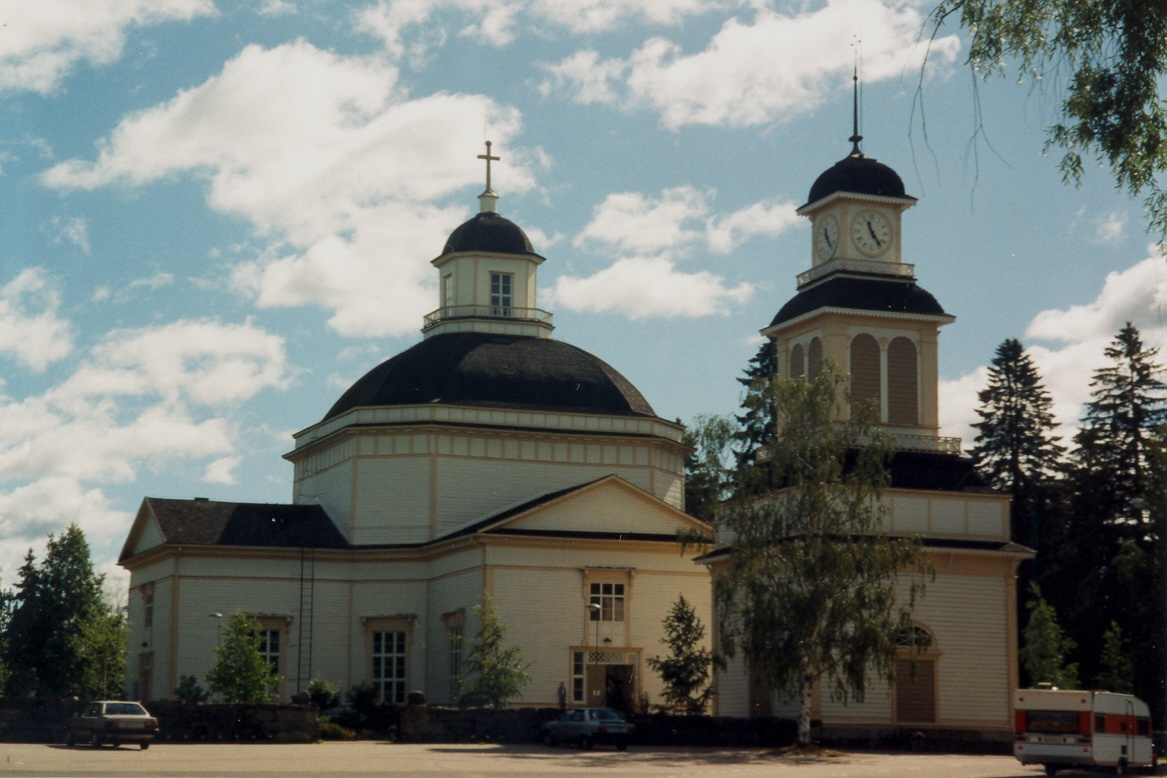
- Alajärvi Church

- Coat of arms

- Location of Alajärvi in Finland
- Interactive map of Alajärvi
- Coordinates: 63°00′N 023°49′E
- Country: Finland
- Region: South Ostrobothnia
- Sub-region: Järviseutu
- Charter: 1869
- Town privileges: 1986

Government
  - Town manager: Vesa Koivunen

Area (2018-01-01)
  - Total: 1,056.74 km^{2} (408.01 sq mi)
  - Land: 1,008.77 km^{2} (389.49 sq mi)
  - Water: 47.99 km^{2} (18.53 sq mi)
  - Rank: 78th largest in Finland

Population (2025-12-31)
  - Total: 8,982
  - Rank: 106th largest in Finland
  - Density: 8.9/km^{2} (23/sq mi)

Population by native language
  - Finnish: 94.7% (official)
  - Swedish: 0.1%
  - Others: 5.2%

Population by age
  - 0 to 14: 17.4%
  - 15 to 64: 54.3%
  - 65 or older: 28.3%
- Time zone: UTC+02:00 (EET)
  - Summer (DST): UTC+03:00 (EEST)
- Website: alajarvi.fi

Alajärvi (Finnish pronunciation: [ˈɑlɑˌjærʋi]; lit. 'lower lake') is a town and municipality of Finland. It is located in the South Ostrobothnia region. The town has a population of 8,982 (31 December 2025) and covers an area of 1,056.74 square kilometres (408.01 sq mi) of which 47.99 km^{2} (18.53 sq mi) is water. The population density is 8.9 inhabitants per square kilometre (23/sq mi). The town is unilingually Finnish.

The municipality of Lehtimäki was consolidated with Alajärvi on 1 January 2009.

== Geography ==
The neighboring municipalities of Alajärvi are Alavus, Kuortane, Kyyjärvi, Lappajärvi, Lapua, Perho, Soini, Vimpeli and Ähtäri.

=== Villages ===
In 1967, Alajärvi had eight legally recognized villages (henkikirjakylät):

- Alajärvi
- Hoisko
- Kurejoki
- Menkijärvi
- Möksy
- Savonkylä
- Tarvolankylä
- Päällysaho
- Vimpeli

== Economy ==
In 2018, 11.2% of the workforce of Alajärvi worked in primary production (agriculture, forestry and fishing), 29.9% in secondary production (e.g. manufacturing, construction and infrastructure), and 57.1% in services. In 2019, the unemployment rate was 9.3%, and the share of pensioners in the population was 33.0%.

Though a small town, Alajärvi has a few shops, namely K-Supermarket, Tokmanni, Lidl and a few others. In 2013 a public natatorium was opened, which also includes a weight room.

=== Urban areas ===
In 2019, out of the total population of 9,562, 5,846 people lived in urban areas and 3,641 in sparsely populated areas, while the coordinates of 75 people were unknown. This made Alajärvi's degree of urbanization 61.6%. The urban population in the municipality was divided among three urban areas as follows:

#	Urban area	Population
1	Alajärvi central locality	5,029
2	Lehtimäki	570
3	Luoma-aho	247

=== Climate ===
Alajärvi has a subarctic climate (Dfc).

Climate data for Alajärvi Möksy (1991-2020 normals, records 1959-present)
Month	Jan	Feb	Mar	Apr	May	Jun	Jul	Aug	Sep	Oct	Nov	Dec	Year
Record high °C (°F)	7.8 (46.0)	10.0 (50.0)	14.1 (57.4)	23.2 (73.8)	29.8 (85.6)	32.1 (89.8)	33.6 (92.5)	30.8 (87.4)	27.0 (80.6)	19.8 (67.6)	11.2 (52.2)	8.1 (46.6)	33.6 (92.5)
Daily mean °C (°F)	−7.4 (18.7)	−7.9 (17.8)	−4.0 (24.8)	2.0 (35.6)	8.3 (46.9)	13.2 (55.8)	15.9 (60.6)	13.8 (56.8)	8.7 (47.7)	3.0 (37.4)	−1.4 (29.5)	−4.9 (23.2)	3.3 (37.9)
Record low °C (°F)	−42.0 (−43.6)	−45.5 (−49.9)	−36.0 (−32.8)	−22.2 (−8.0)	−10.0 (14.0)	−6.6 (20.1)	−2.7 (27.1)	−6.8 (19.8)	−9.5 (14.9)	−23.4 (−10.1)	−32.1 (−25.8)	−37.2 (−35.0)	−45.5 (−49.9)
Average precipitation mm (inches)	42 (1.7)	33 (1.3)	34 (1.3)	34 (1.3)	48 (1.9)	72 (2.8)	79 (3.1)	75 (3.0)	61 (2.4)	64 (2.5)	54 (2.1)	50 (2.0)	646 (25.4)
Average precipitation days	11	9	8	8	8	10	11	11	10	12	11	12	121
Source: https://www.ilmatieteenlaitos.fi/ilmastollinen-vertailukausi https://kilotavu.com/fmi-tilastot.php?taulukkomoodi=true

== Demographics ==
In 2020, 17.4% of the population of Alajärvi was under the age of 15, 54.3% were aged 15 to 64, and 28.3% were over the age of 64. The average age was 46.1, above the national average of 43.4 and regional average of 44.7. Speakers of Finnish made up 96.8% of the population and speakers of Swedish made up 0.1%, while the share of speakers of foreign languages was 3.0%. Foreign nationals made up 2.8% of the total population.

The chart below, describing the development of the total population of Alajärvi from 1975 to 2020, encompasses the municipality's area as of 2021.

Historical population

Year	Pop.	±% p.a.
1975	10,771	—
1980	11,089	+0.58%
1985	11,683	+1.05%
1990	11,963	+0.47%
1995	11,890	−0.12%

Year	Pop.	±% p.a.
2000	11,503	−0.66%
2005	10,910	−1.05%
2010	10,487	−0.79%
2015	10,006	−0.93%
2020	9,419	−1.20%

Source: Statistics Finland

== Culture ==
The Alajärvi Church, also known as the Church of Gabriel, was designed by Carl Ludvig Engel and completed in 1836.

There are several buildings in the town and surrounding area designed by architect Alvar Aalto, both from the very early and later stages of his career: the Youth Association building (1919), Myllykangas farmhouse alterations (1920), Villa Väinölä (1926), Villa Flora (Aino Aalto, 1926), Municipal Hospital (1928), Grave memorials in the Church of Gabriel cemetery (1918, 1940, 1944), and the Administrative Centre (1965-1970) and Library (design 1966, built 1991).

The town is home to the Nelimarkka Museum. The museum was built by the painter Eero Nelimarkka. It was designed by his friend, the architect Hilding Ekelund.

The men's pesäpallo club Alajärven Ankkurit competes in the Superpesis national league, playing at Kitro Stadium.

== Notable people ==
- Reijo Hongisto
- Martti Korkia-Aho
- Matti Luoma-aho
- Eero Nelimarkka
- Eino Ojajärvi
- Jesse Salmenautio
- Verner Thomé
- Reijo Vähälä

Also, Alvar Aalto spent summers in Alajärvi in his youth and even lived there until his marriage in 1925.

== Gallery ==
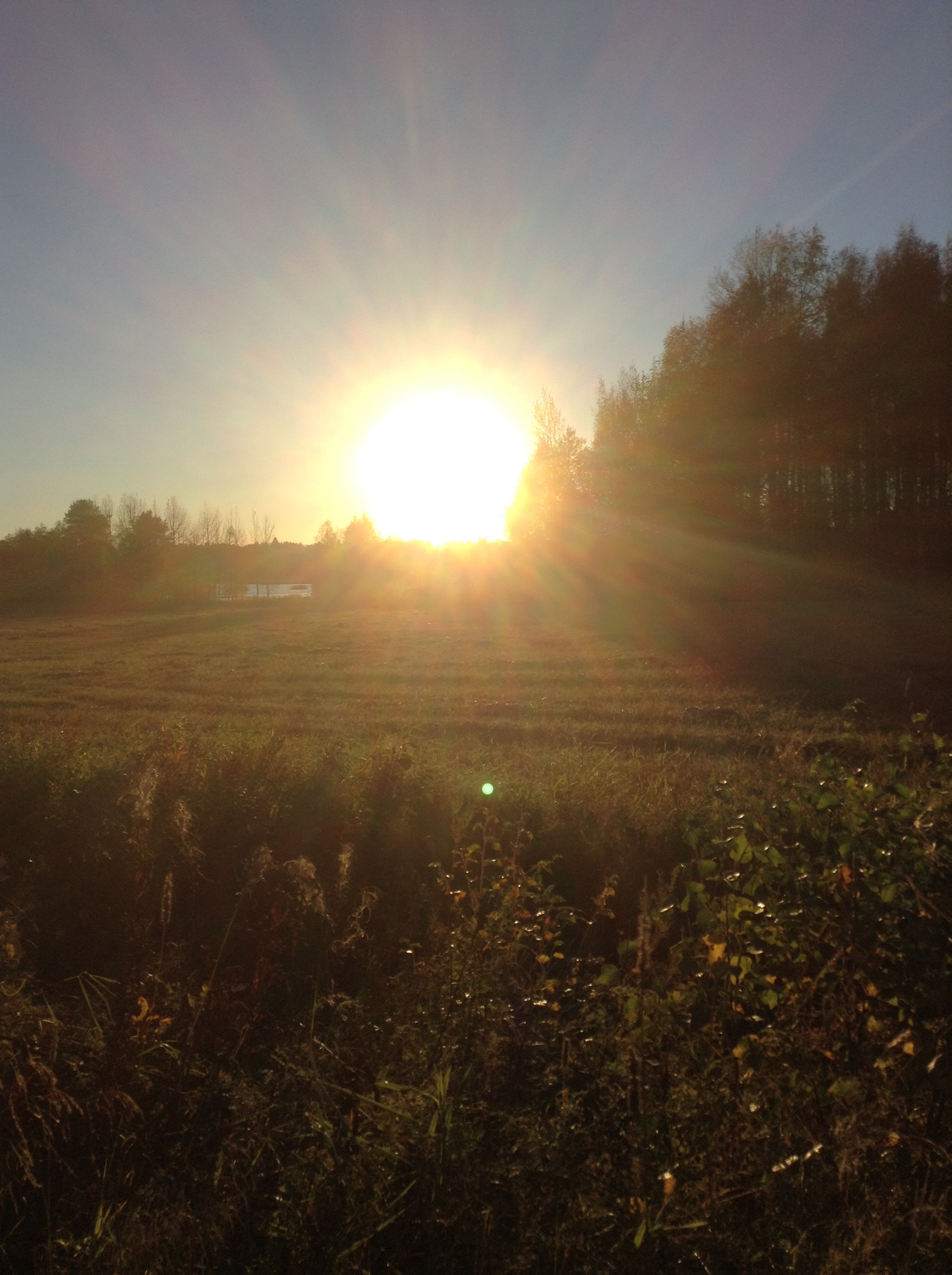
The sun in Alajärvi, Finland.

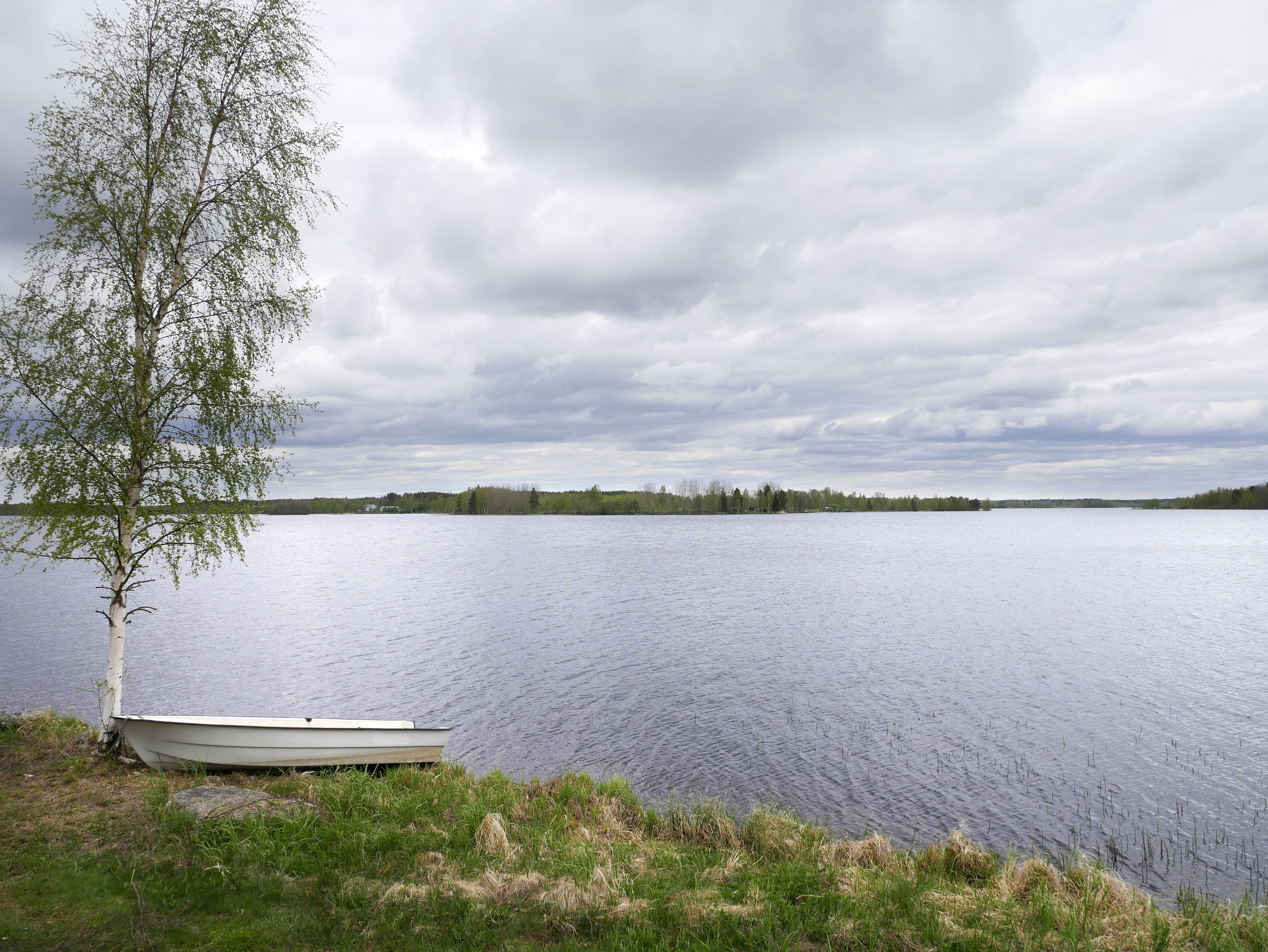
Lake Alajärvi, 2017

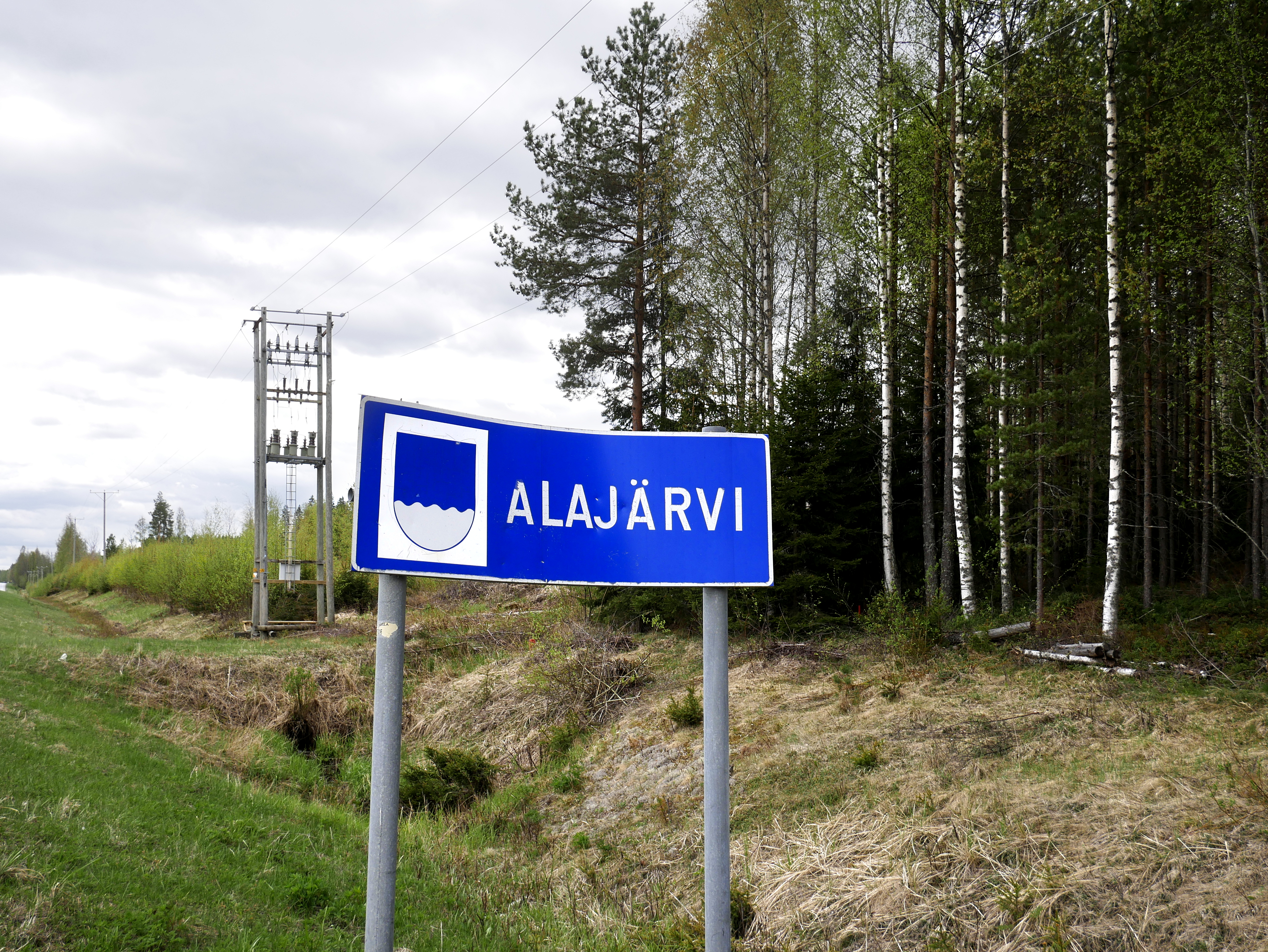
Alajärvi municipal border sign

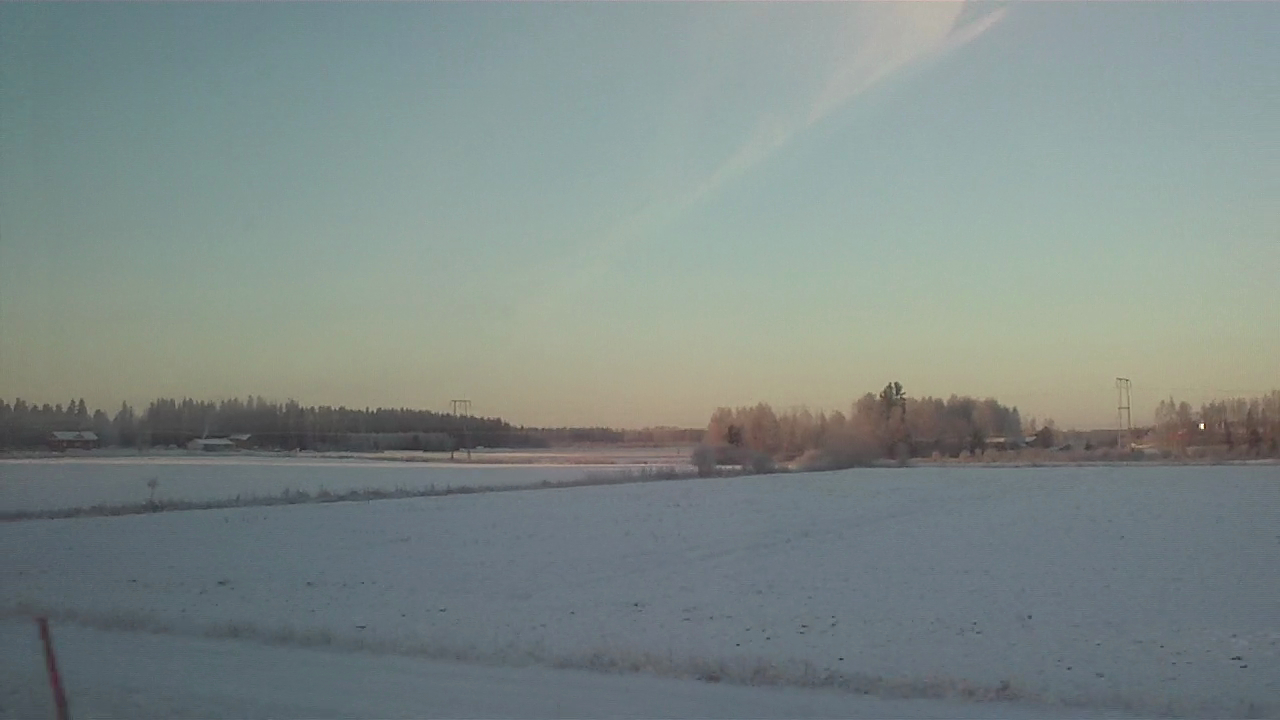
Alajärvi plains

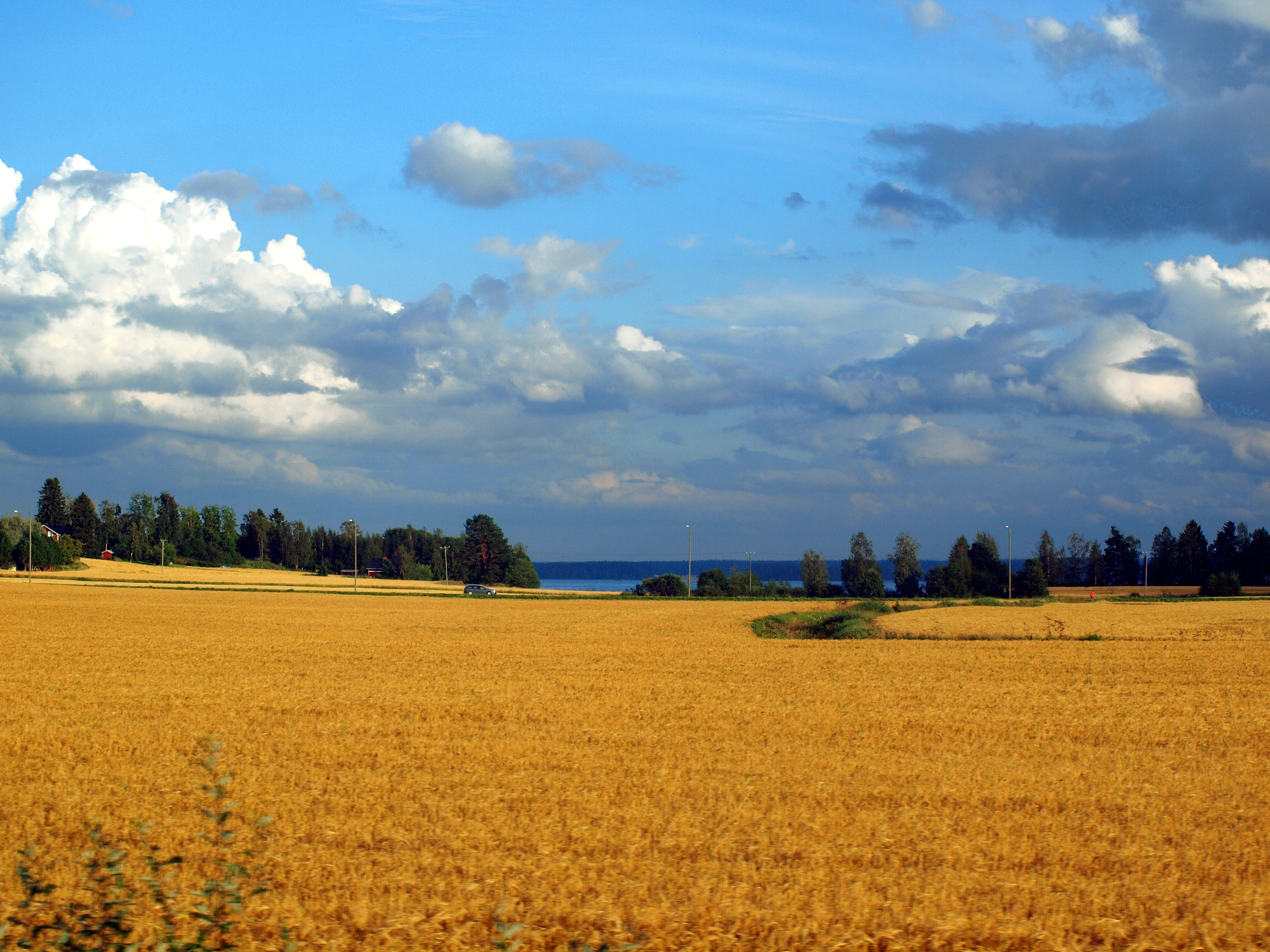
field in Alajärvi, 2014

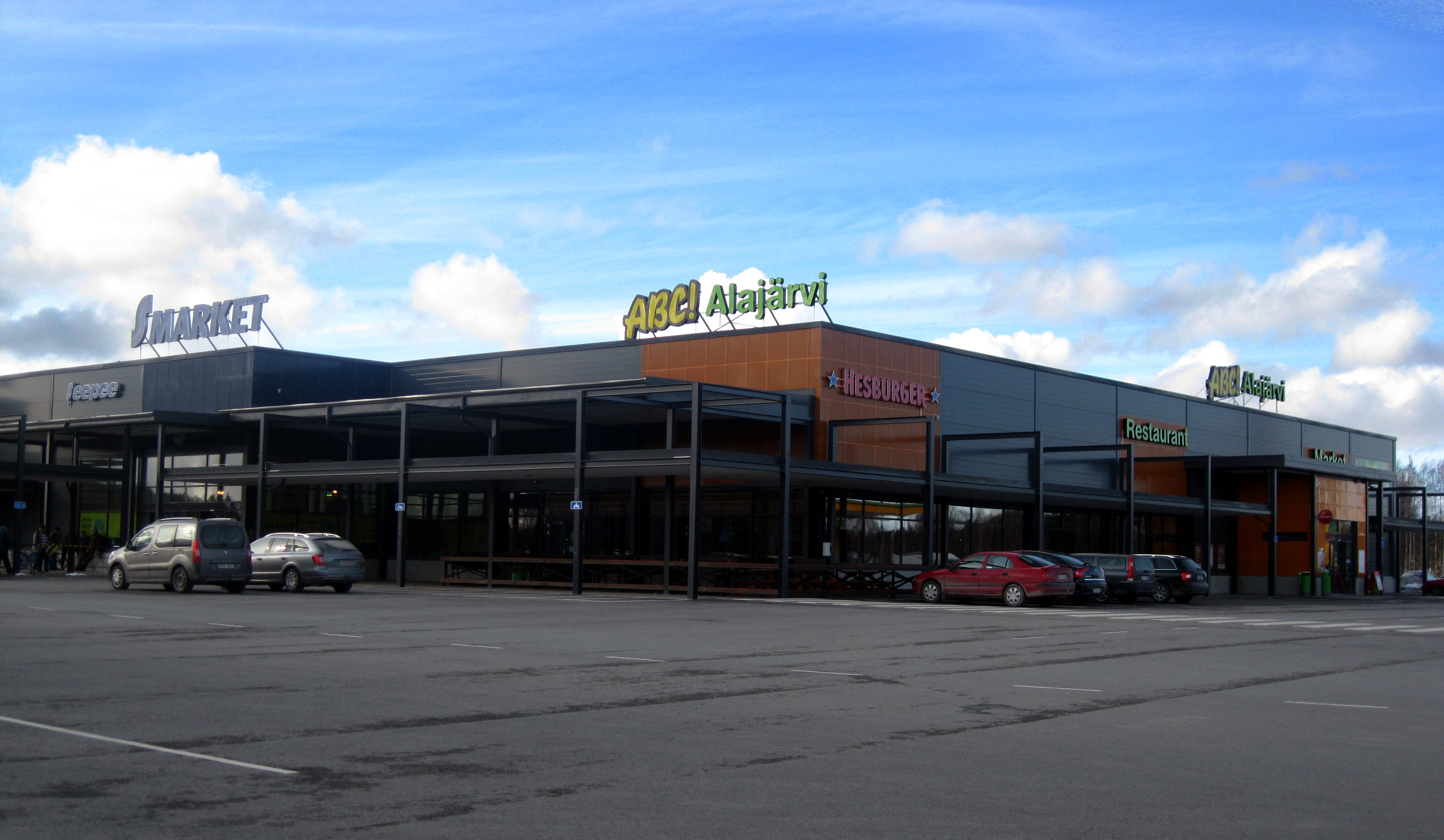
Supermarket in Alajärvi
