= Antti Nikkilä =

Finnish basketball player (born 1978)

Personal information
- Born: 25 August 1978 (age 46); Tampere, Finland
- Listed height: 6 ft 11 in (2.11 m)
- Listed weight: 264 lb (120 kg)

Career information
- College: Valparaiso (1999–2003)
- NBA draft: 2003: undrafted
- Playing career: 1997–2016
- Position: Center
- Number: 8

Career history
- 1997–1999: Tampereen Pyrintö
- 2003–2004: Aris Thessaloniki
- 2004–2005: Ionikos
- 2005: BCM Gravelines
- 2005–2006: Pepsi Caserta
- 2006–2007: ČEZ Nymburk
- 2007–2008: Dinamo Sassari
- 2008–2009: Tampereen Pyrintö
- 2009–2010: Girona
- 2010: Mitteldeutscher BC
- 2010–2014: Tampereen Pyrintö
- 2015–2016: Nokia

Antti Nikkilä (born 25 August 1978) is a Finnish retired basketball player. He stands 2.10 m (6 ft 11 in) tall and weighs 122 kg (269 lb).

He played college basketball at Valparaiso University from 1999 until 2003, and in the season 2006–2007, played for ČEZ Basketball Nymburk in the Czech basketball league. In June 2007, he was signed by Dinamo Banco di Sardegna Sassari (Italian Legadue basketball league). He also played for ARIS BC.

== Career statistics ==
=== National team ===
Team	Tournament	Pos.	GP	PPG	RPG	APG
Finland	EuroBasket 2011	9th	8	2.0	1.5	0.3
Finland	EuroBasket 2013	9th	4	1.0	0.8	0.3

== Awards ==
- Korisliiga Rookie of the Year: 1997–98
- Greek Cup Winner: (2004)
