= Eero Nelimarkka =

Finnish painter (1891–1977)

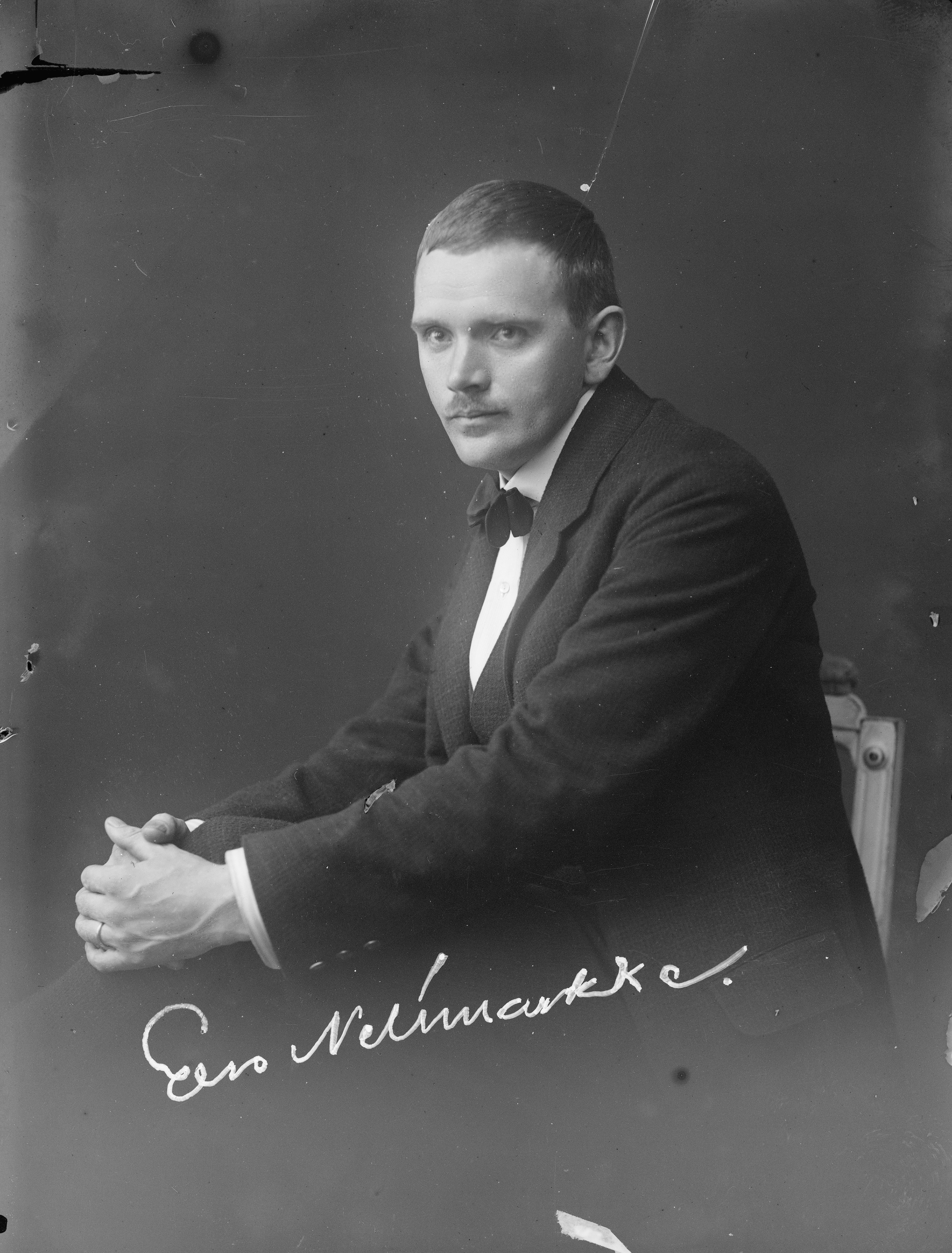
- Born: 10 October 1891; Vaasa, Grand Duchy of Finland
- Died: 27 January 1977 (aged 85); Helsinki, Finland
- Known for: Painting, drawing, sculpture
- Awards: Pro Finlandia 1956

Eero Aleksander Nelimarkka (10 October 1891 – 27 January 1977) was a Finnish painter. He is best known for depicting the plain landscapes of Ostrobothnia but he also produced portraits of notable Finns and family members.

== Biography ==
Nelimarkka was born in Finland on 10 October 1891, at Vaasa, the son of Erkki Nelimarkka, a tailor, and Maria Nelimarkka (née Koivukangas). In 1912, Nelimarkka studied at Académie de la Grande Chaumière and in Académie Julian.

In 1945, Nelimarkka established "The Nelimarkka Foundation". The founders also included J. A. Hollo. The mission of the Nelimarkka Foundation is to preserve and promote Eero Nelimarkka's production and life's work. In 1964, he built the Nelimarkka Museum on his father's farm at Alajärvi in southern Ostrobothnia. Its core collection of some 1700 works is owned by the Nelimarkka Foundation.

Nelimarkka died on 27 January 1977, aged 85, in Helsinki. He is buried in the Hietaniemi Cemetery in Helsinki.

== Personal life ==
Nelimarkka's son Antti Nelimarkka founded Neles. Antti Nelimarkka's daughter is artist Riitta Nelimarkka-Seeck, mother of writer Max Seeck.
