= Alajärvi Church =

- Church of Gabriel
- Alajärven kirkko
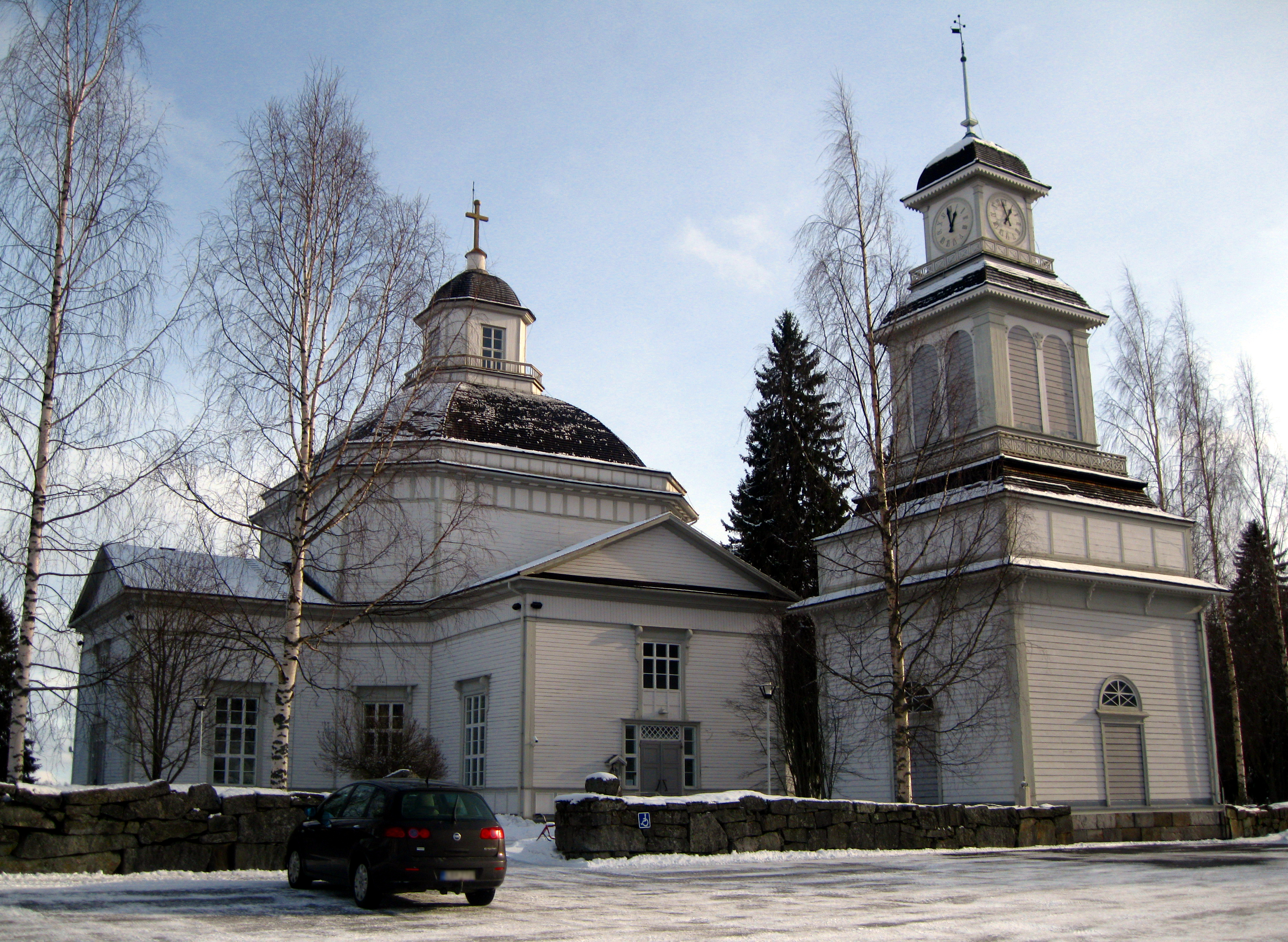
- Alajärvi Church in 2015
- Alajärvi Church
- 63.000556°N 23.825556°E
- Location: Alajärvi
- Country: Finland
- Denomination: Lutheran
- Website: https://www.alajarvenseurakunta.fi/kirkot-ja-tilat/alajarven-kirkko

History
- Status: Parish church
- Dedication: Archangel Gabriel
- Consecrated: 21 March 1841

Architecture
- Functional status: Active
- Heritage designation: protected
- Architect: Carl Ludvig Engel
- Architectural type: neoclassical
- Completed: 1836

Specifications
- Capacity: 1,000
- Materials: timber

Administration
- Parish: Alajärvi parish (Alajärven seurakunta)

Alajärvi Church, also known as the Church of Gabriel (Finnish: Gabrielin kirkko), is the main Lutheran church in the city of Alajärvi, Finland.

== Architecture ==
The church was designed by the leading architect operating in Finland at the time, Carl Ludvig Engel, completed in 1836 and consecrated in 1841. It is designed in the neoclassical style, and constructed of timber, under a tarred wood shingle roof. There is a standalone bell tower next to the church.

The main altarpiece was created in 1907 by the Finnish, Alajärvi-born post-impressionist artist Verner Thomé, and depicts Jesus's agony in the Gethsemane.

In 1896, the church was refurbished, adding an internal balcony with seating, bringing the total seating capacity to 1,200, although in its current configuration it seats c. 1,000.

The church, along with the city centre public and administrative buildings complex designed by the Finnish architect Alvar Aalto, has been designated and protected by the Finnish Heritage Agency as a nationally important built cultural environment (Valtakunnallisesti merkittävä rakennettu kulttuuriympäristö).

== Gallery ==
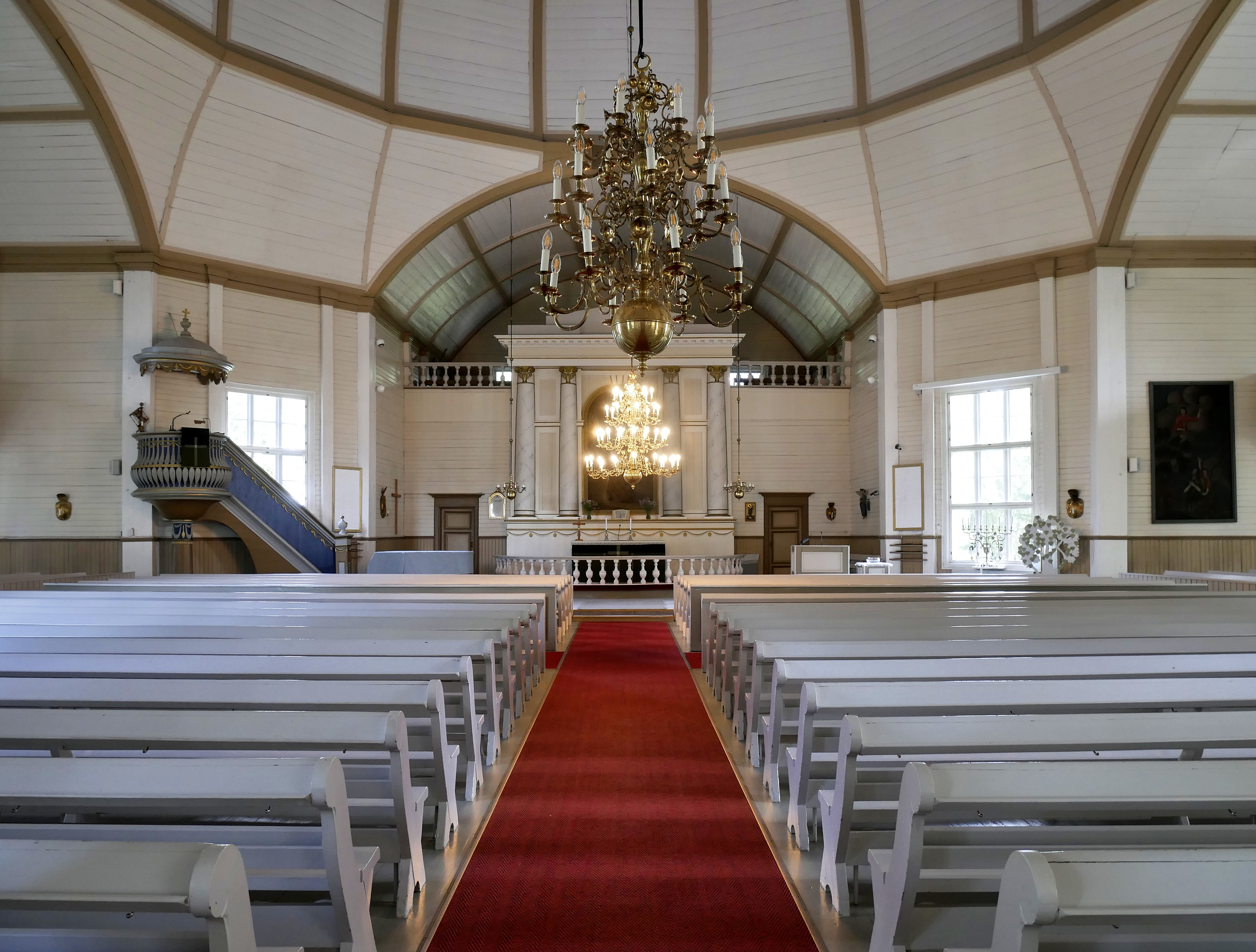
Interior view towards the chancel

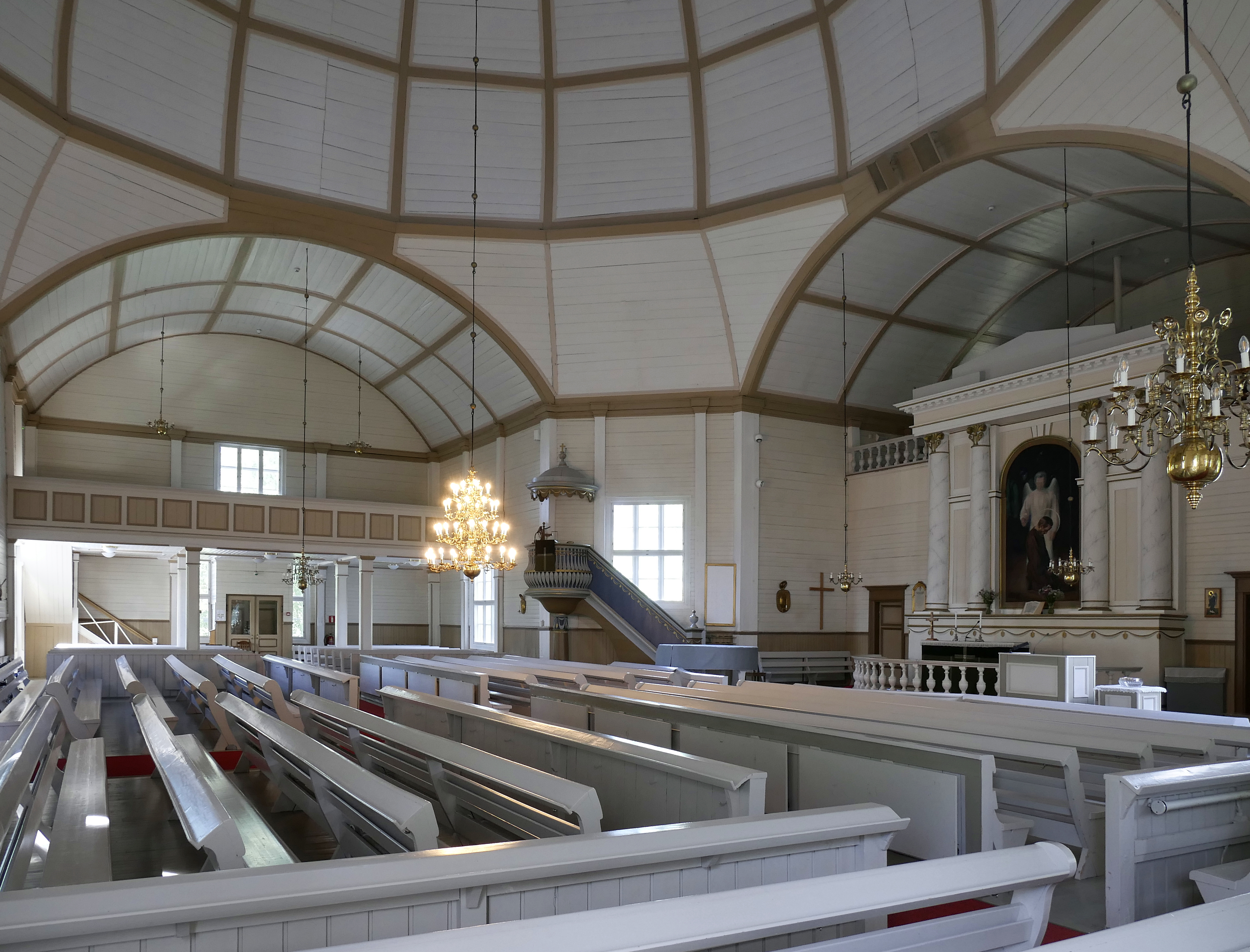
Interior view with the altarpiece and pulpit visible

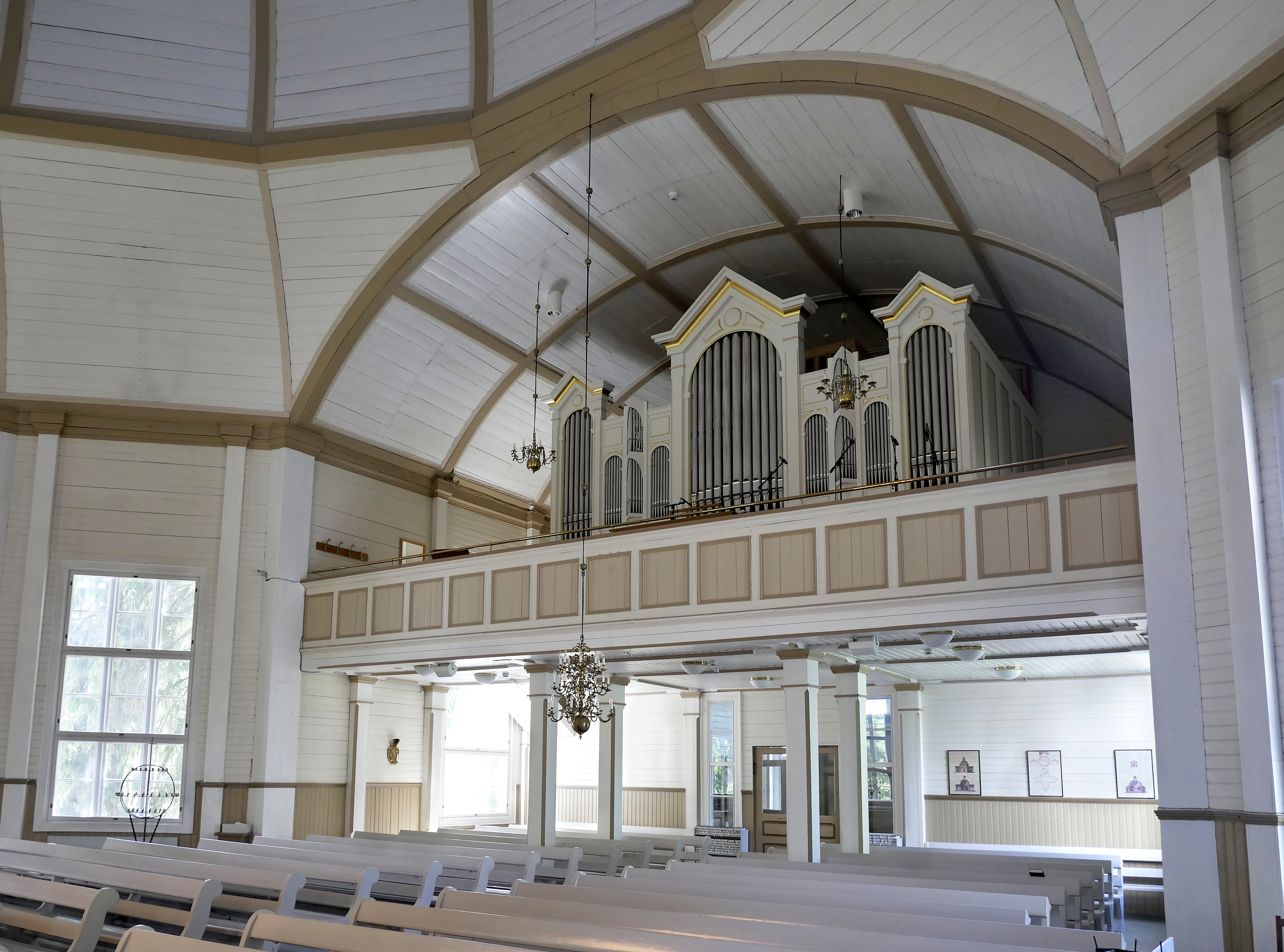
Interior view towards the church organ
