= Olavi Ahonen (basketball) =

Finnish basketball player (1941–1995)

Personal information
- Born: January 31, 1941 Tampere, Finland
- Died: April 16, 1995 (aged 54) Tampere, Finland
- Listed height: 6 ft 0 in (1.83 m)

Career information
- Playing career: 1960–1977

Career history
- 1960–1970: Tampereen Pyrintö
- 1970–1977: Pispalan Tarmo

Career highlights
- No. 7 retired by the Tampereen Pyrintö; Sixth place in EuroBasket 1967; Finnish Cup 1969; Nordic Championship 1966

Olavi Antero Ahonen (January 31, 1941 – April 16, 1995) was a Finnish basketball player. 184 cm tall Ahonen played for Tampereen Pyrintö and Pispalan Tarmo in Korisliiga. Pyrintö has retired Ahonen's jersey but allowes players to use his number 7.

Ahonen had also 51 caps in Finland national basketball team and belonged to the Finnish squad in EuroBasket 1967 that achieved the sixth place, country's best position in men's international basketball competitions until then. With the national team he also won the Nordic championship in 1966.

== Trophies and awards ==
- Jersey #7 retired by Tampereen Pyrintö
- Sixth place in EuroBasket 1967
- Nordic Championship 1966
- Finnish Cup 1969
