= Alajärvi administrative centre =

Municipal buildings in Alajärvi, Finland

Coordinates: 62.999957°N 23.823153°E

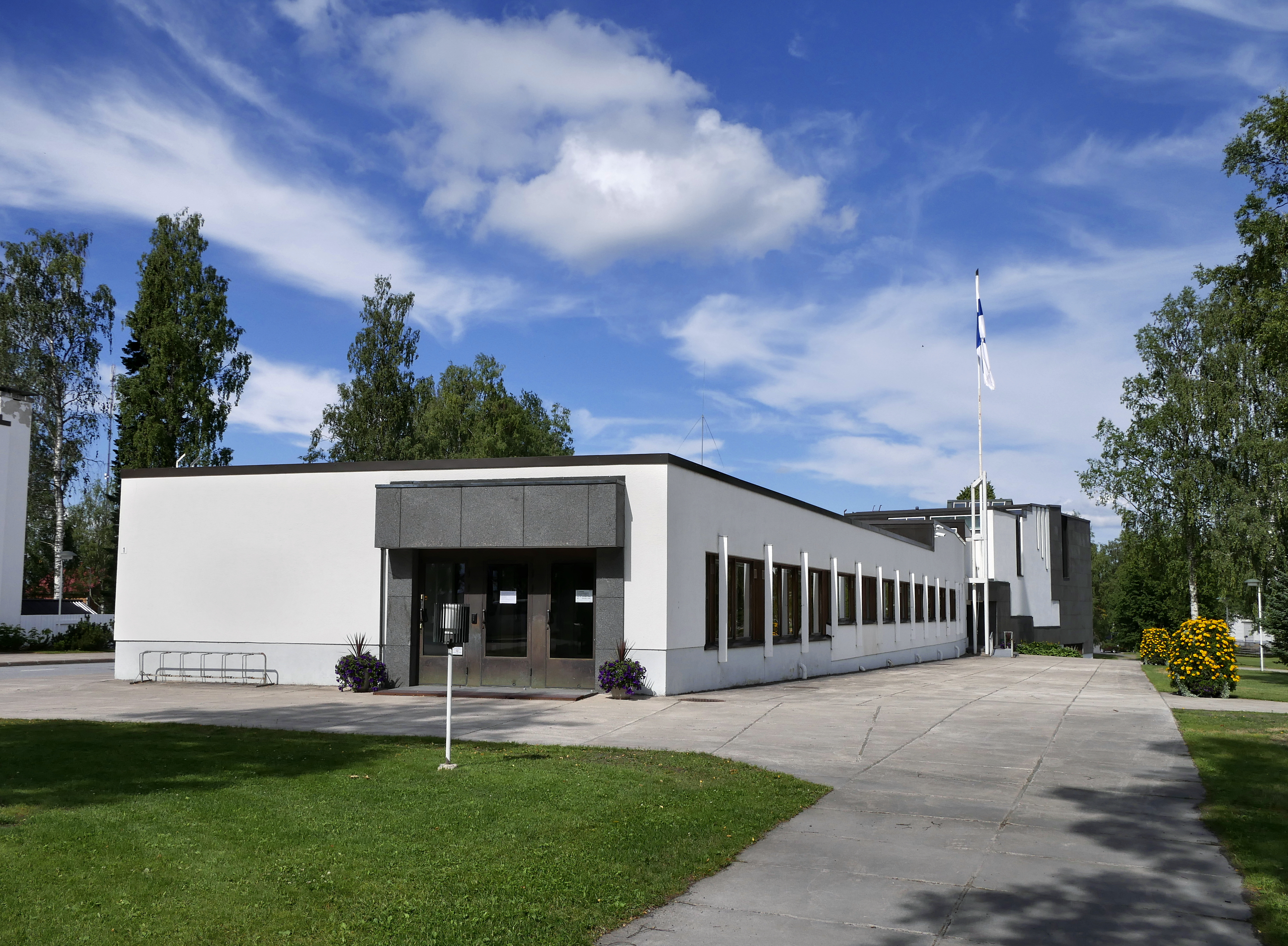
Alajärvi city hall

The Alajärvi administrative centre (Finnish: Alajärven hallintokeskus) is a buildings complex in the town of Alajärvi, Finland, comprising the town hall and related offices, health centre, parish hall and other buildings. It was designed by Finnish architect Alvar Aalto, who also designed the adjacent library building.

== Details ==
The town hall and health centre were completed in 1967; the parish hall became ready in 1970.

The complex has been designated and protected by the Finnish Heritage Agency as a nationally important built cultural environment (Valtakunnallisesti merkittävä rakennettu kulttuuriympäristö).

Aalto was born and raised near Alajärvi and had a close connection with the area, and consequently designed several buildings there. The Museovirasto has classified the administrative center as a cultural site of national interest in Finland.

== See also ==
- Alajärvi Library
