= Juhana Aho =

Finnish ice hockey goaltender

- Born: September 30, 1993 (age 33) Jyväskylä, Finland
- Height: 5 ft 10 in (178 cm)
- Weight: 163 lb (74 kg; 11 st 9 lb)
- Position: Goaltender
- Catches: Left
- Liiga team Former teams: Jukurit; Dornbirner EC
- Playing career: 2013–present

Juhana Aho (born September 30, 1993) is a Finnish professional ice hockey goaltender currently playing for Jukurit of the Liiga.

Aho made his Liiga debut for Jukurit during the 2017–18 Liiga season. He previously played in the Mestis for Jukurit as well as JYP-Akatemia, SaPKo and Imatran Ketterä. He also had a spell in the Erste Bank Eishockey Liga (EBEL) in Austria in 2019 for Dornbirner EC.
