= Matti Luoma-aho =

Finnish politician

Matti Luoma-aho (26 December 1885 - 27 December 1943) was a Finnish farmer and politician, born in Alajärvi. He was a member of the Parliament of Finland from 1939 until his death in 1943, representing the Agrarian League.
