= Eric Aho =

American painter

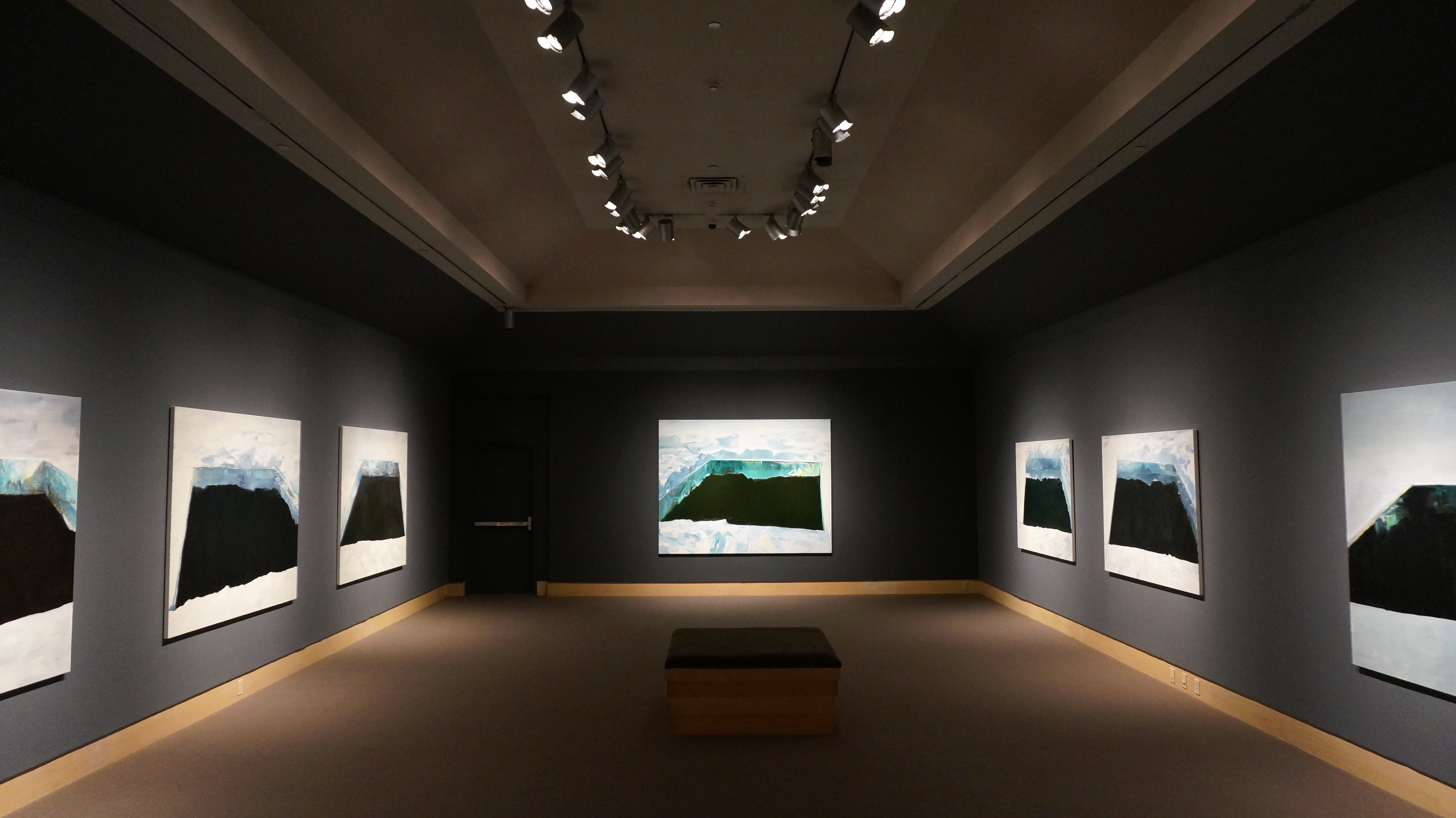
Eric Aho's "Ice Cuts" series of paintings installed at the Hood Museum of Art, Dartmouth (2016). Photo by Alison Palizzolo.

Eric Aho (born 1966) is an American painter living in Vermont. DC Moore Gallery in New York City represents his work.

== Early life and education ==
Aho was born in Melrose, Massachusetts and moved to New Hampshire with his family in 1974. His father, whose parents had emigrated from Finland, worked for the Boston and Maine Railroad.

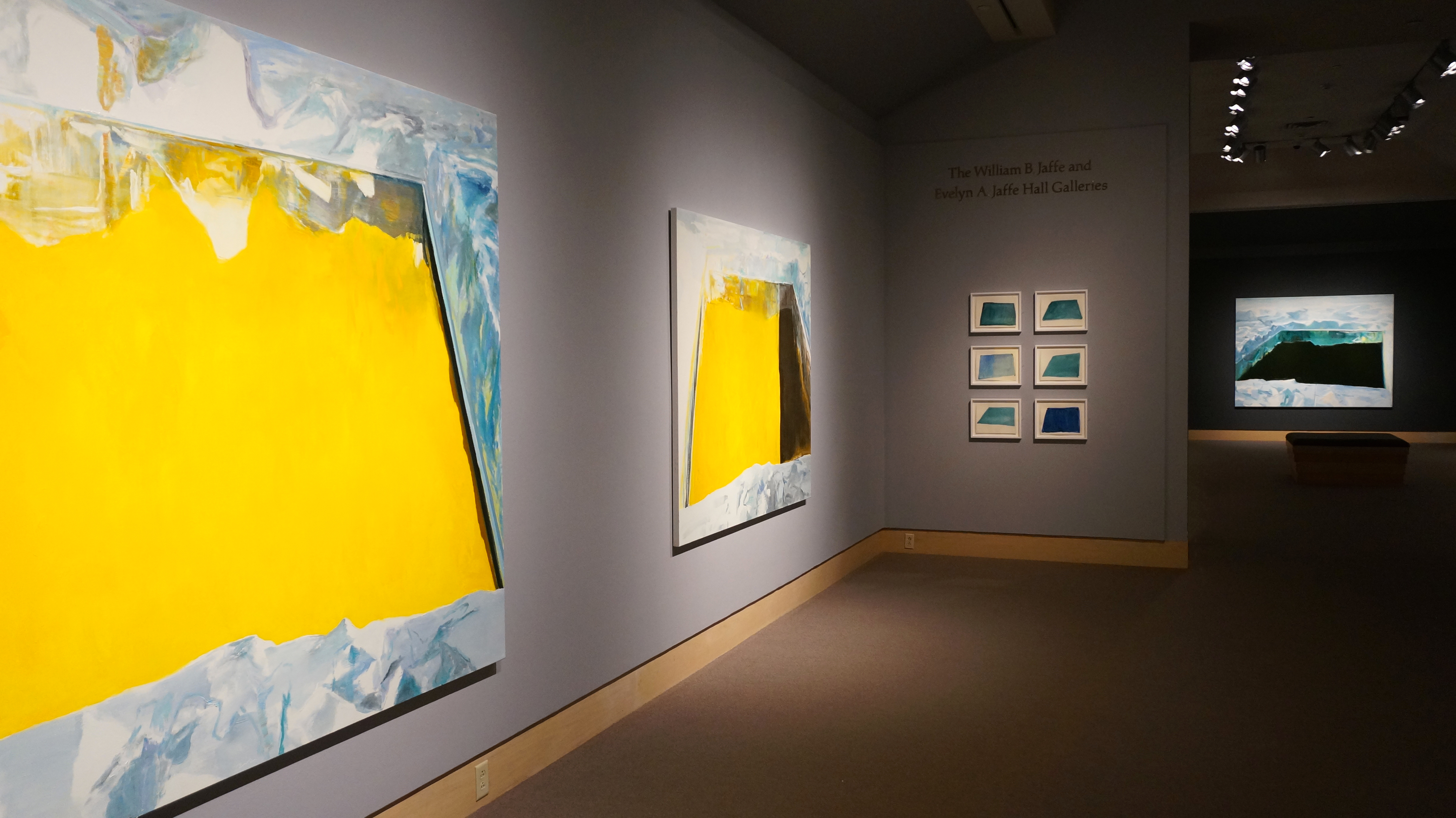
Eric Aho's "Ice Cuts" series of paintings installed at the Hood Museum of Art, Dartmouth (2016). Photo by Alison Palizzolo.

Aho studied at the Central School of Art and Design in London (1986–87), and received a BFA from the Massachusetts College of Art and Design in 1988. In 1989, he participated in the first exchange of scholars in over thirty years between the U.S. and Cuba. He completed his graduate work at the Lahti Art Institute (now the Lahti University of Applied Sciences) in Finland supported by a Fulbright Scholarship in 1991-92 and an American-Scandinavian Foundation grant in 1993.

== Career ==
Aho's paintings are noted for the way they simultaneously convey the power and fragility of nature. In an essay about Aho's painting, Donald Kuspit wrote: "He is a master of the natural sublime, but he realizes that intensely experienced nature becomes uncannily abstract, with no loss of concreteness. Aho puts the sublime back in nature, suggesting its abstract structure without denying its concrete fullness." He adds, "Aho regenerates abstraction by returning to its roots in the boundless generativity of nature, and with that gives us a fresh aesthetic consciousness of it."

From 1989 to 1998 Aho taught painting at the Putney School in Putney, Vermont. Since 1998, Aho has held an adjunct position as visiting lecturer in the Graduate Light Design Program at the University of the Arts in Helsinki, Finland, and has taught at the University of Lapland in Rovaniemi, Finland. He has been a visiting artist and critic at the Burren College of Art in County Clare, Ireland; the Ballinglen Arts Foundation in County Mayo Ireland; the Weir Farm National Historic Trust in Connecticut; Colgate University in Hamilton, New York; the National College of Art in Oslo, Norway; the University of Art and Design in Helsinki, Finland; the St. Paul's School, Concord, New Hampshire and the Harvard Graduate School of Design.

Aho's exhibitions include the Portland Museum of Art in Portland, Maine; the Aldrich Museum of Contemporary Art in Ridgefield, CT; the Ogunquit Museum of American Art; the McMullen Museum at Boston College; the Nagoya/Boston Museum of Fine Arts, Nagoya, Japan; the National Academy of Design and the American Academy of Arts and Letters in New York City. The Oulu Museum of Art in Oulu, Finland; the Fleming Museum at the University of Vermont; The Currier Museum of Art, Manchester, NH; the Hood Museum of Art, Hanover, NH and the New Britain Museum of American Art, CT have presented solo exhibitions.

His paintings can be found in public collections throughout the country and abroad including the permanent collections of the Fine Arts Museum of San Francisco, the Springfield Art Museum, the Currier Museum of Art, the Hood Museum of Art, the Metropolitan Museum of Art, and the Museum of Fine Arts, Boston.

=== Ice Cuts ===
In the winter of 2016, the Hood Museum of Art presented Eric Aho: Ice Cuts curated by Katherine W. Hart. Aho's paintings of stark holes cut into a frozen pond prompted Hart to call Aho "One of the leading painters of landscape and the environment of his generation." Ice Cuts also brought praise from Sebastian Smee of The Boston Globe, who wrote: "Aho’s paintings enact an answer to mysterious, counterintuitive questions. The dynamic between black water and white ice is also a correlative — natural, not forced or contrived — of the much-masticated tension in 20th-century art between abstract and representational imagery, between the real and the reproduced." Smee concluded by declaring the work "a major accomplishment." In December 2016, Smee included Eric Aho: Ice Cuts in his "year-end round up," writing, "Eric Aho’s paintings of plunge pools cut out of ice at the Hood at Dartmouth College were fresh, bold, subtle, and urgent."

== Solo exhibitions ==
=== 2017 ===
- 2017: Eric Aho: Inflection Point, DC Moore Gallery, New York
- 2016
  - Eric Aho: An Unfinished Point in a Vast Surrounding, New Britain Museum of American Art, CT
  - Eric Aho: Ice Cuts, Hood Museum of Art, Hanover, NH
- 2015: Eric Aho: Wilderness Studio, DC Moore Gallery, New York
- 2013
  - Eric Aho: Translation, DC Moore Gallery, New York
  - Eric Aho: In the Landscape, Federal Reserve Board, Washington
- 2012: Transcending Nature: Paintings by Eric Aho, Currier Museum of Art, Manchester, NH
- 2011: Eric Aho: Covert, DC Moore Gallery, New York
- 2010
  - Occurrence, Tory Folliard Gallery, Milwaukee
  - Eric Aho: Memory and Invention, Hidell Brooks Gallery, Charlotte, NC
- 2009
  - Eric Aho: Red Winter, DC Moore Gallery, New York
  - Eric Aho: Ice Box, Brattleboro Museum, VT
- 2008
  - Wilderness, Alpha Gallery, Boston
  - Outermost, Brickwalk Fine Art, West Hartford, CT
- 2007
  - Quarry, Reeves Contemporary, New York
  - New Paintings, Tory Folliard Gallery, Milwaukee
- 2006
  - The Becoming Line: Pastel Drawings, Brickwalk Fine Art, West Hartford, CT
  - Copper Field Suite: New Monotypes, Center for Contemporary Printmaking, Norwalk, CT
  - Geography IV, Alpha Gallery, Boston
  - Paintings, Hidell Brooks Gallery, Charlotte, NC
- 2005
  - New Paintings, Reeves Contemporary, New York
  - Paintings, Tory Folliard Gallery, Milwaukee
  - Monotypes, Devin Borden Hiram Butler Gallery, Houston
- 2004
  - Paintings, Spheris Gallery, Bellows Falls, VT
  - New Paintings, Alpha Gallery, Boston
  - Texas Papers, Devin Borden Hiram Butler Gallery, Houston
- 2003
  - The Overstory, Reeves Contemporary, New York
  - Paintings, Gallery BE’19, Helsinki
  - Recent Work, Paesaggio Gallery, West Hartford, CT
  - The Overhead Lake: New Paintings, Hargate Art Center, St. Paul's School, Concord, NH
  - Tremaine Gallery, Hotchkiss School, Lakeville, CT
- 2002
  - New Paintings, Munson Gallery, Santa Fe
    - Watershed: Paintings of the Connecticut River Valley, Saint-Gaudens National Historic Site, Cornish, NH
      - Distances: Paintings of New England and Ireland, Alpha Gallery, Boston
- 2001
  - Three Counties, Spheris Gallery, Walpole, NH
  - The River, Field and Sky: New Paintings, Susan Conway Gallery, Washington
- 2000
  - Standing Still, New Paintings, Munson Gallery, Santa Fe
  - Pure Geography, Barton-Ryan Gallery, Boston
- 1999
  - The Distant Landscape: New Paintings, Spheris Gallery, Walpole, NH
  - New Helsinki Views, Galleria Pintura, Helsinki
  - A Passion for Winter: The Landscapes of Eric Aho, Susan Conway Gallery, Washington
- 1998
  - Recent Paintings, Spheris Gallery, Walpole, NH
  - The Qualities of Heaven and Earth, Oulu City Art Museum, Finland; Vermont College, Montpelier; Embassy of Finland, Washington
- 1996: Nocturnes: Recent Paintings by Eric Aho, Fleming Museum, University of Vermont, Burlington
- 1994: Paintings, Gallery Pelin, Helsinki
- 1991: Paintings from the Hemlock Ravine, Tyler Gallery, Marlboro College, VT

== Reviews and Press Mentions ==
- Spiegelman, Willard. "In Connecticut, Discovering American Art’s First Home," The Wall Street Journal, August 8, 2016
- Dunne, Susan. "Eric Aho’s Wartime-Inspired Abstract Landscapes At NBMAA," Hartford Courant, June 27, 2016
- Butler, Sharon. "Eric Aho Shadows His Father at the New Britain," Two Coats of Paint (Internet), July 26, 2016
- O’Shaughnessy, Tracey. "The Private Power of Landscapes," Waterbury Republican American, June 5, 2016
- Vermont Public Radio, 2016, "Looking Into The Ice, Saxtons River Artist Meditates On Winter"
- Valley News, February 2016, "Art Notes: Painter Eric Aho Looks Deep Into a Hole in the Ice"
- Art New England, March 2016, "Eric Aho, Ice Cuts"
- American Art Collector, 2016
- DC Moore Gallery Art New England, July/August 2012
- Art News, December 2011 "Eric Aho: DC Moore Gallery
- Art in America, December 2009
- Art Daily, October 2009, "First Presentation of Eric Aho's Work at DC Moore Gallery"
