= Tampereen Pyrintö (basketball) =

Pyrintö
- Leagues: Korisliiga
- Founded: 1941; 85 years ago
- History: Tampereen Pyrintö (1941–present)
- Arena: Pyynikin Palloiluhalli
- Location: Tampere, Finland
- Team colors: White and Red
- Head coach: Tero Vasell
- Championships: 3 Finnish Championships; 2 Finnish Cups
- Website: www.pyrinto.fi
| Home | Away |

Tampereen Pyrintö, more commonly referred to as shortly Pyrintö, is a Finnish basketball team from Tampere. It is the basketball section of a club with the same name. Pyrintö's men's and women's teams play in Korisliiga, the highest tier of Finnish basketball.

After 2010 Pyrintö has participated internationally in the EuroChallenge and the Baltic Basketball League.

== Achievements ==
- Korisliiga: 3

Champions: 2010, 2011, 2014
Runner-up: 1958, 1980, 1981, 2001, 2016
Third–place: 2009

- Finnish Basketball Cup: 2

Champions: 1969, 2013
Runner-up: 2000, 2009, 2011, 2019, 2021

- Baltic Basketball League

Fourth–place: 2014

== Current roster ==
Note: Flags indicate national team eligibility at FIBA-sanctioned events. Players may hold other non-FIBA nationalities not displayed.

Tampereen Pyrintö roster
Players
Coaches

| Pos. | No. | Nat. | Name | Ht. |
|---|---|---|---|---|
| SG | 5 | (Finland) | Tomas Pihlajamäki | 1.94 m (6 ft 4 in) |
| PG | 7 | (Finland) | Valtteri Leppänen | 1.87 m (6 ft 2 in) |
| PG | 9 | (Finland) | Lassi Kilpinen | 1.85 m (6 ft 1 in) |
| G/F | 10 | (Finland) | Osku Heinonen | 1.94 m (6 ft 4 in) |
| G | 12 | (United States) | David Gonzalvez | 1.93 m (6 ft 4 in) |
| F | 14 | (Finland) | Eero Lehtonen | 1.95 m (6 ft 5 in) |
| F/C | 16 | (Finland) | Panu Peltokangas | 2.01 m (6 ft 7 in) |
| PG | | (Finland) | Valtteri Mervola | 1.85 m (6 ft 1 in) |
| PG | | (Finland) | Antero Lehto | 1.85 m (6 ft 1 in) |
| PG | | (Finland) | Trey Niemi | 1.87 m (6 ft 2 in) |
| G/F | | (Greece) | Ioannis Chatzinikolas | 1.96 m (6 ft 5 in) |

Head coach

(Finland) Miikka Sopanen

Assistant coach(es)

(Finland) Damon Williams
(Finland) Santeri Liljeberg

Legend

- (C) Team captain
- Injured

- Roster
Updated: 24 July 2021

=== Retired numbers ===
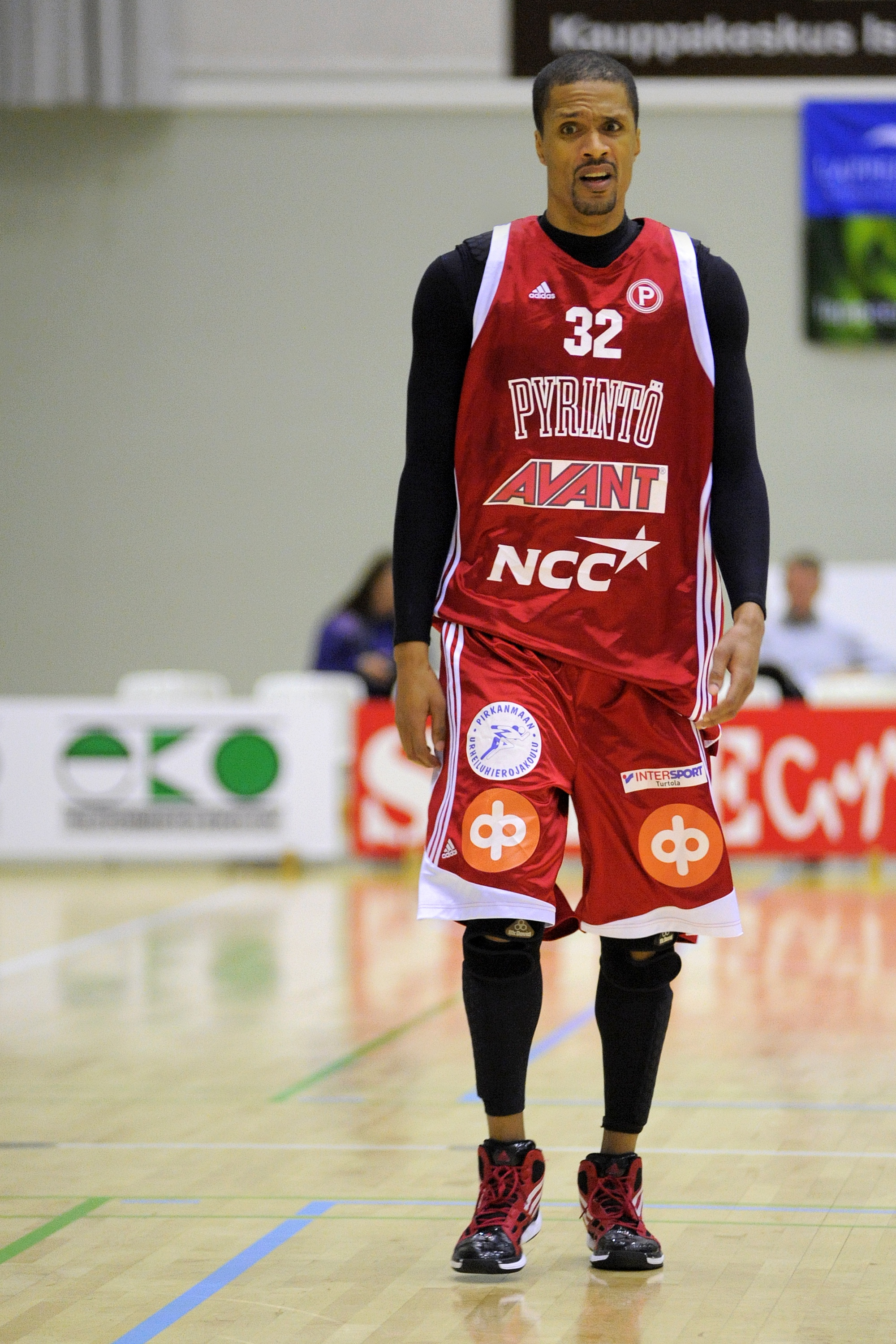
Damon Williams, Pyrintö all-time statistical leader in multiple categories.

All numbers are hanging in the rafters of the home arena, but current players can still play with them excluding Williams′ #32.

Tampereen Pyrintö retired numbers
| N° | Nat. | Player | Position | Tenure |
| 4 | (Finland) | Antero Lehto | G | 2000–2006, 2007-2020, 2023-2025 |
| 5 | (Finland) | Arvo Jantunen | N/A | 1949–1966 |
| 7 | (Finland) | Olavi Ahonen | G | 1960–1970 |
| 7 | (Finland) | Ismo Niemi | N/A | 1978–1987 |
| 8 | (Finland) | Jarmo Laitinen | N/A | As player: 1979–1989; As head coach: 1985–2008 |
| 8 | (Finland) | Antti Nikkilä | N/A | 1996–2014 |
| 15 | (Finland) | Kalevi Tuominen | N/A | 1952–1963 |
| 32 | (United States) | Damon Williams | F | 1999–2016 |

=== Notable players ===
To appear in this section a player must have either: played at least one season for the club, set a club record or won an individual award while at the club, played at least one official international match for their national team at any time or performed very successfully during period in the club or at later/previous stages of his career.

- (Finland) Olavi Ahonen ◆◆
- (Finland) Olli Ahvenniemi ◆
- (Finland) Joonas Cavén ◆◆
- (Finland) Petri Heinonen ◆◆
- (Finland) Shawn Hopkins ◆◆
- (Finland) Arvo Jantunen ◆◆
- (Finland) Pentti Kaivonen ◆
- (Finland) Mikko Koskinen ◆◆◆
- (Finland) Jarmo Laitinen ◆◆◆
- (Finland) Antero Lehto ◆◆◆
- (Finland) Tero Minetti ◆
- (Finland) Antti Nikkilä ◆◆◆
- (Finland) Topias Palmi ◆◆
- (Finland) Kalevi Tuominen ◆◆
- (New Zealand) Jordan Ngatai
- (New Zealand) Ethan Rusbatch
- (Soviet Union) / (Estonia) Heino Enden ◆◆
- (United States) Ashante Johnson ◆
- (United States) Carl Kilpatrick ◆
- (United States) Edmund Lawrence ◆
- (United States) Kelvin Lewis ◆
- (United States) Kenneth Lowe ◆
- (United States) Ricky Minard ◆
- (United States) / (United Kingdom) Shawn Myers ◆
- (United States) Marcus Norris ◆◆
- (United States) B.J. Raymond ◆
- (United States) Eric Washington ◆
- (United States) Damon Williams ◆◆

Notes
◆ Played at least one official international match for their national team at any time.
◆ Set a club record or won an individual award while at the club.
◆ To perform very successfully during period in the club or at later/previous stages of his career.

== Women's team ==
Pyrintö's women's team currently plays in Women's Korisliiga, the highest tier of basketball for women in Finland, and has won eight Finnish titles and the Finnish Cup once. Among club's women's team, Pyrintö has retired the jersey of Seija Leino.

== Former coaches ==
- (Finland) Pieti Poikola
