= Anders Ahonen =

Finnish diplomat and railroad engineer

Anders Ahonen (1865–1932) was a railroad engineer, the Director of the Railway Board 1908–1917 and a diplomat. He was an expert at the Tartu peace negotiations in 1920.

In his time a new railway station was built in Helsinki. He was appointed as representative to Moscow on 21 January 1921 when the diplomatic relations between Finland and Soviet Russia had come into force at the end of the year. His post was half a year.
