= Martti Korkia-Aho =

Finnish politician

Martti Einar Korkia-Aho (12 September 1930, Alajärvi – 19 January 2012) was a Finnish businessman and politician. He was a member of the Parliament of Finland from 1987 to 1991, representing the National Coalition Party.
