= Finnish Basketball Player of the Year =

The Finnish Basketball Player of the Year is an annual award that is given to the best basketball player (male or female) with Finnish citizenship. Finnish players that are playing anywhere in the world, qualify for the award. The award is voted on by Finnish sports journalists. The award was first given in 1948. Hanno Möttölä and Lauri Markkanen have won the most player of the year awards, with eight.

A female player has been chosen for the award three times. The first female selection was Hilkka Hakola, who won the player of the year award in 1956. Pekka Markkanen and Lauri Markkanen are the only father and son combination to win the award. The most recent player of the year winner is Lauri Markkanen, his eighth win in a row. He is the only Finnish player to be an NBA All Star.

== Finnish Players of the Year ==
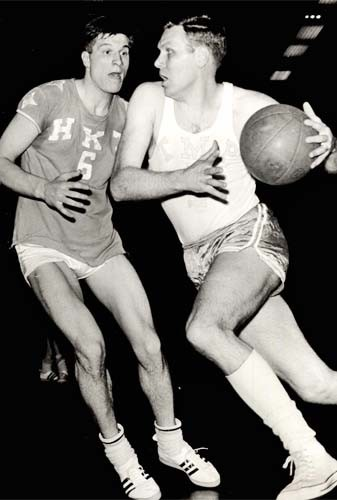
Raimo Lindholm (on the right) was a six time Player of the Year.

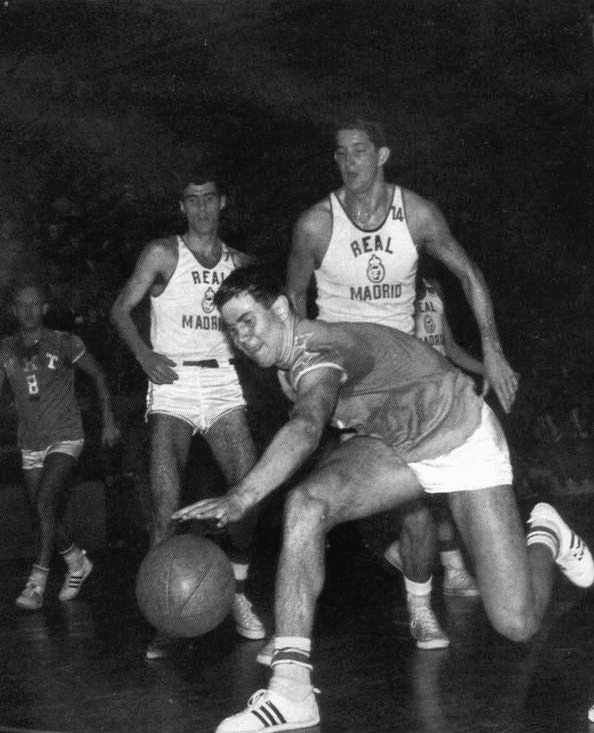
Kari Liimo was a six time Player of the Year

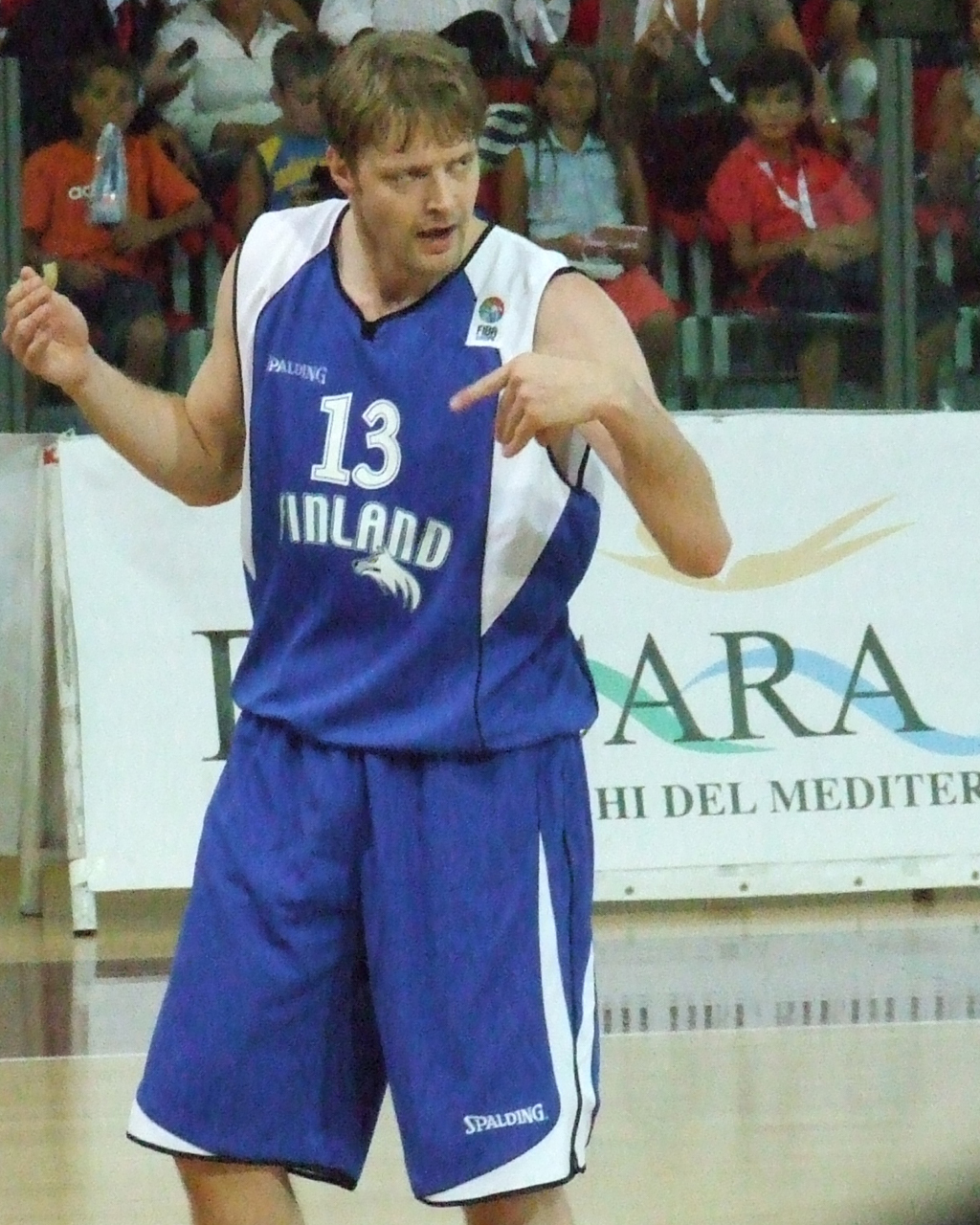
Hanno Möttölä was an eight time Player of the Year.

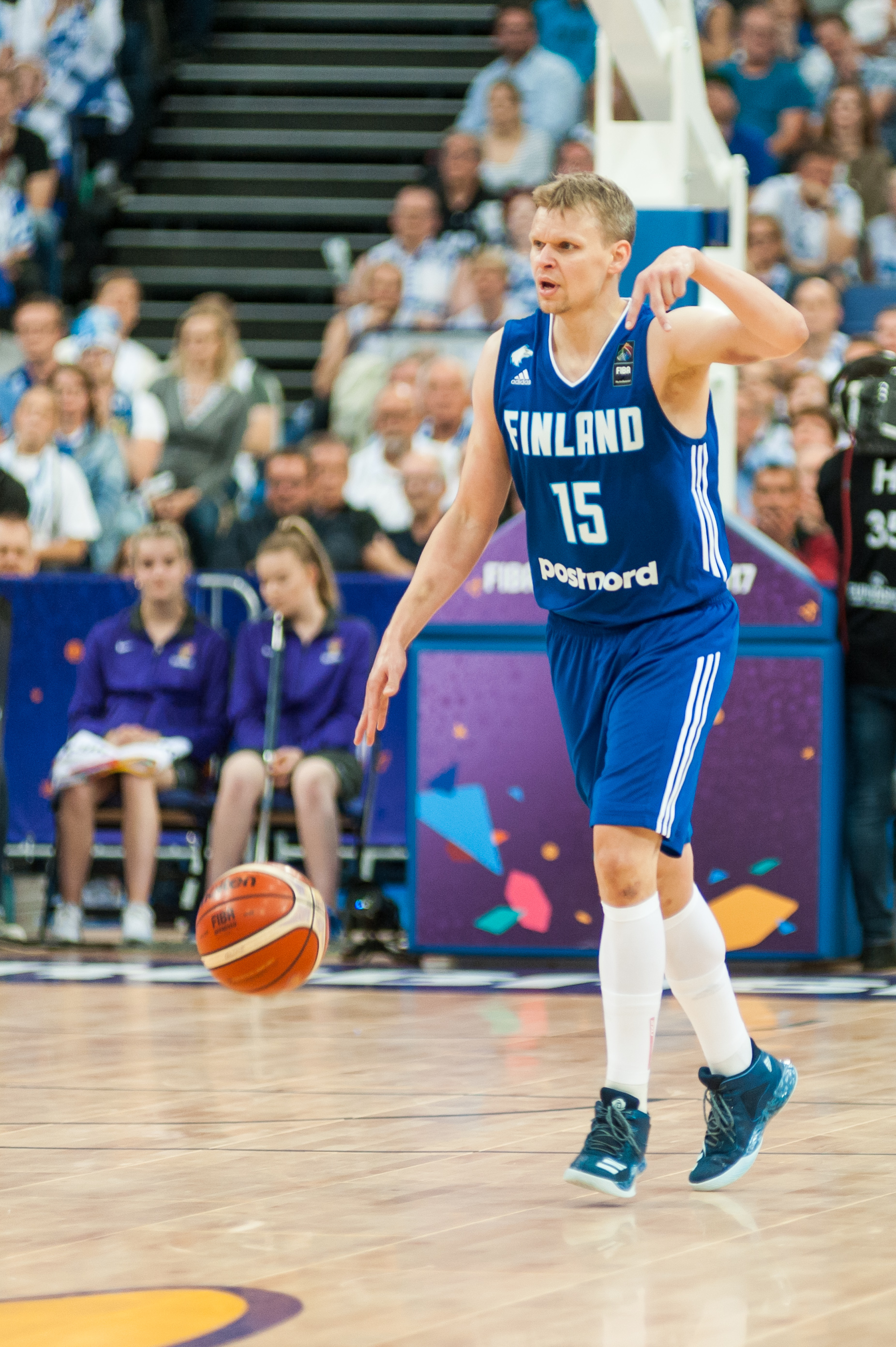
Teemu Rannikko was a five time Player of the Year.

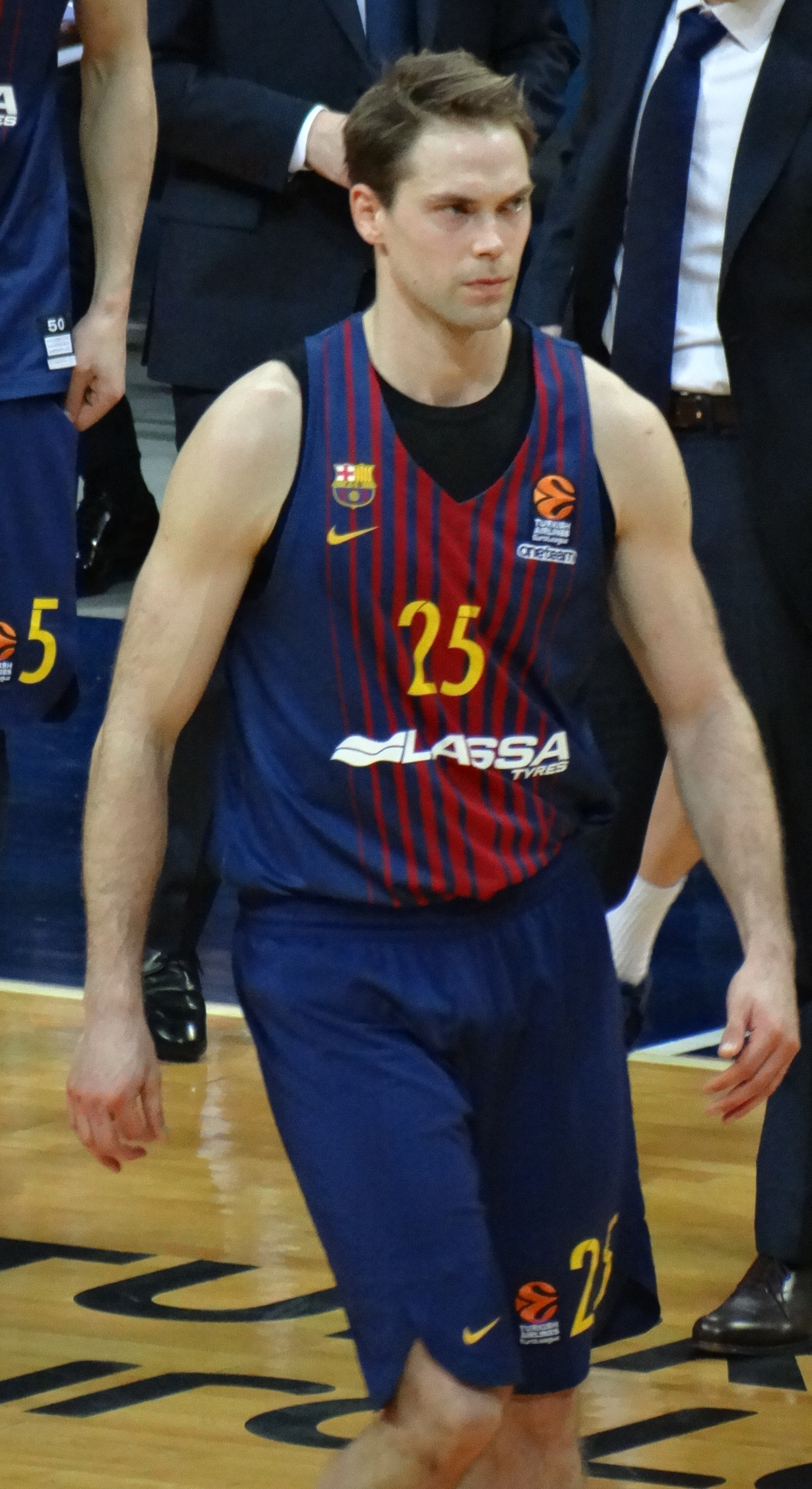
Petteri Koponen was a seven time Player of the Year.

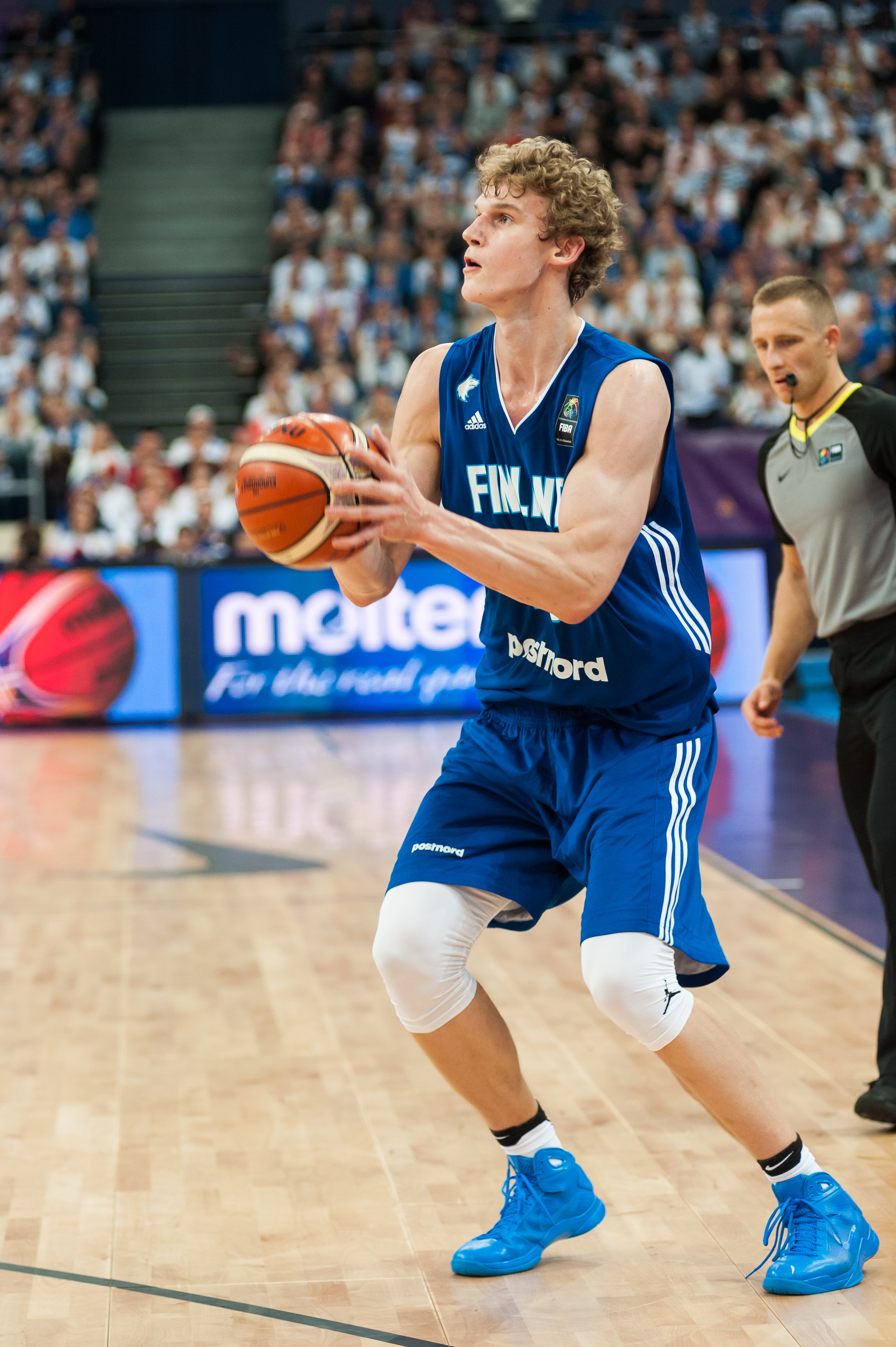
Lauri Markkanen won the award first time in 2017, and since then has won it eight consecutive times.

Year	Player of the Year	Team
1948	Kalevi Heinänen	Elannon Isku
1949	Kalevi Heinänen	Elannon Isku
1950	Raimo Lindholm	Työväen Maila-Pojat
1951	Raimo Lindholm	Työväen Maila-Pojat
1952	Timo Suviranta	Pantterit
1953	Raimo Lindholm	Työväen Maila-Pojat
1954	Timo Suviranta	Pantterit
1955	Raimo Lindholm	Työväen Maila-Pojat
1956	Hilkka Hakola	Helsingin Visa
1957	Raimo Lindholm	Työväen Maila-Pojat
1958	Raimo Lindholm	Työväen Maila-Pojat
1959	Seppo Kuusela	Pantterit
1960	Seppo Kuusela	Pantterit
1961	Timo Lampen	Lahden NMKY
1962	Timo Lampen	Lahden NMKY
1963	Kari Liimo	Helsingin Kisa-Toverit
1964	Kari Liimo	Helsingin Kisa-Toverit
1965	Kari Liimo	Helsingin Kisa-Toverit
1966	Jorma Pilkevaara	Torpan Pojat
1967	Jorma Pilkevaara	Torpan Pojat
1968	Jorma Pilkevaara	Torpan Pojat
1969	Kari Liimo	Helsingin Kisa-Toverit
1970	Kari Liimo	Turun Riento
1971	Kari Liimo	Helsingin Kisa-Toverit
1972	Kalevi Sarkalahti	Helsingin Kisa-Toverit
1973	Jorma Pilkevaara	Turun NMKY
1974	Kalevi Sarkalahti	Playboys
1975	Kalevi Sarkalahti	Playboys
1976	Kalevi Sarkalahti	Playboys
1977	Anssi Rauramo	Torpan Pojat
1978	Anssi Rauramo	Torpan Pojat
1979	Risto Lignell	Pantterit
1980	Risto Lignell	Pantterit
1981	Lea Hakala	Lahden Sampo
1982	Heikki Kasko	Hyvinkään Tahko
1983	Jouko Heikkinen	Hongikon Nuorisoseuran Urheilijat
1984	Heikki Kasko	Torpan Pojat
1985	Pertti Marttila	Kotkan TP
1986	Kari-Pekka Klinga	Torpan Pojat
1987	Sakari Pehkonen	Helsingin NMKY
1988	Larry Pounds	Kotkan TP
1989	Pekka Markkanen	Hongikon Nuorisoseuran Urheilijat
1990	Larry Pounds	Kotkan TP
1991	Larry Pounds	Kotkan TP
1992	Anja Bordt	Karhun Pojat
1993	Pekka Markkanen	Hongikon Nuorisoseuran Urheilijat
1994	Kari-Pekka Klinga	Torpan Pojat
1995	Martti Kuisma	Helsingin NMKY
1996	Pekka Markkanen	Torpan Pojat
1997	Hanno Möttölä	University of Utah
1998	Hanno Möttölä	University of Utah
1999	Hanno Möttölä	University of Utah
2000	Hanno Möttölä	Atlanta Hawks
2001	Hanno Möttölä	Atlanta Hawks
2002	Hanno Möttölä	Atlanta Hawks / TAU Cerámica
2003	Teemu Rannikko	Roseto Basket / Scavolini Pesaro
2004	Hanno Möttölä	Skipper Bologna / Scavolini Pesaro
2005	Hanno Möttölä	Scavolini Pesaro / Dynamo Moscow
2006	Teemu Rannikko	Olimpija Ljubljana
2007	Teemu Rannikko	Olimpija Ljubljana / Khimki
2008	Petteri Koponen	Espoon Honka / Virtus Bologna
2009	Teemu Rannikko	Khimki / CB Granada
2010	Teemu Rannikko	CB Granada / Pallacanestro Varese
2011	Petteri Koponen	Virtus Bologna
2012	Petteri Koponen	Virtus Bologna / Khimki
2013	Petteri Koponen	Khimki
2014	Petteri Koponen	Khimki
2015	Petteri Koponen	Khimki
2016	Petteri Koponen	Khimki / FC Barcelona
2017	Lauri Markkanen	University of Arizona / Chicago Bulls
2018	Lauri Markkanen	Chicago Bulls
2019	Lauri Markkanen	Chicago Bulls
2020	Lauri Markkanen	Chicago Bulls
2021	Lauri Markkanen	Chicago Bulls / Cleveland Cavaliers
2022	Lauri Markkanen	Cleveland Cavaliers / Utah Jazz
2023	Lauri Markkanen	Utah Jazz
2024	Lauri Markkanen	Utah Jazz

== Number of awards won by player ==
Rank	Player	Awards won	Years Won
1.	Hanno Möttölä	8	1997–2002, 2004–2005
1.	Lauri Markkanen	8	2017–2024
2.	Petteri Koponen	7	2008, 2011–2016
3.	Kari Liimo	6	1963–1965, 1969–1971
3.	Raimo Lindholm	6	1950–1951, 1953, 1955, 1957–1958
6.	Teemu Rannikko	5	2003, 2006–2007, 2009–2010
7.	Kalevi Sarkalahti	4	1972, 1974–1976
7.	Jorma Pilkevaara	4	1966-1968, 1973
8.	Pekka Markkanen	3	1989, 1993, 1996
8.	Larry Pounds	3	1988, 1990–1991
11.	Kalevi Heinänen	2	1948, 1949
11.	Heikki Kasko	2	1982, 1984
11.	Kari-Pekka Klinga	2	1986, 1994
11.	Seppo Kuusela	2	1959–1960
11.	Timo Lampén	2	1961–1962
11.	Risto Lignell	2	1979–1980
11.	Anssi Rauramo	2	1977–1978
11.	Timo Suviranta	2	1952, 1954
18.	Anja Bordt	1	1992
18.	Lea Hakala	1	1981
18.	Hilkka Hakola	1	1956
18.	Jouko Heikkinen	1	1983
18.	Martti Kuisma	1	1995
18.	Pertti Marttila	1	1985
18.	Sakari Pehkonen	1	1987

== See also ==
- Finnish Basketball Hall of Fame
- Finnish League MVP
- Finnish League Finals MVP
