= Lauri Markkanen =

Finnish basketball player (born 1997)

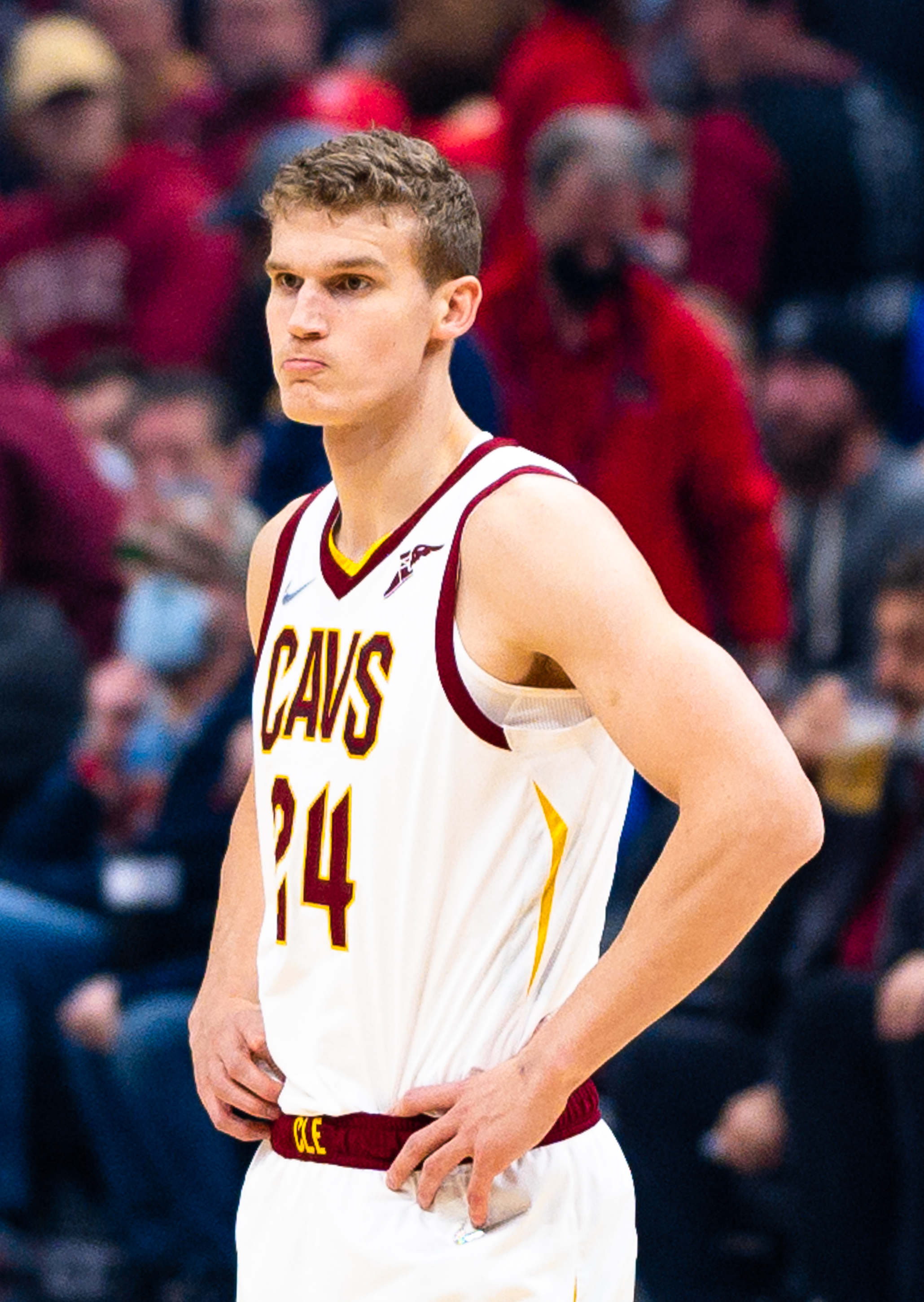
- Markkanen with the Cleveland Cavaliers in 2021

No. 23 – Utah Jazz
- Position: Power forward / center
- League: NBA

Personal information
- Born: 22 May 1997 (age 29) Vantaa, Finland
- Listed height: 7 ft 1 in (2.16 m)
- Listed weight: 240 lb (109 kg)

Career information
- High school: Helsinki Basketball Academy (Helsinki, Finland)
- College: Arizona (2016–2017)
- NBA draft: 2017: 1st round, 7th overall pick
- Drafted by: Minnesota Timberwolves
- Playing career: 2014–present

Career history
- 2014–2016: HBA-Märsky
- 2017–2021: Chicago Bulls
- 2021–2022: Cleveland Cavaliers
- 2022–present: Utah Jazz

Career highlights
- NBA All-Star (2023); NBA Most Improved Player (2023); NBA All-Rookie First Team (2018); Finnish Athlete of the Year (2023); 8× Finnish Player of the Year (2017–2024); Third-team All-American – AP, NABC, SN (2017); First-team All-Pac-12 (2017); Pac-12 All-Freshman team (2017)
- Stats at NBA.com
- Stats at Basketball Reference

Lauri Elias Markkanen (/ˈlaʊri ˈmɑːrkənɛn/; born 22 May 1997) is a Finnish professional basketball player for the Utah Jazz of the National Basketball Association (NBA) and the Finland national team. Nicknamed "the Finnisher", he is the son of Finnish basketball players Pekka and Riikka Markkanen, and the younger brother of footballer Eero Markkanen.

Starting his career with HBA-Märsky in the Finnish second-tier league, Markkanen represented Finland at the FIBA U18 EuroBasket in 2015 and the FIBA U20 EuroBasket in 2016, and was the top scorer in both tournaments. He moved to the United States and played college basketball for the Arizona Wildcats in the 2016–17 season, where he earned first-team All-Pac-12 honours in his lone year with the team. He was selected seventh overall in the 2017 NBA draft by the Minnesota Timberwolves before being included in a draft-night trade to the Chicago Bulls for Jimmy Butler. Following a stint with the Cleveland Cavaliers, Markkanen experienced a career resurgence in his first year with the Jazz, earning his first All-Star selection and winning the Most Improved Player Award in 2023. He also led Finland in the 2023 FIBA Basketball World Cup tournament. After two successful seasons with the Jazz, Markkanen signed a five-year contract extension with the franchise.

Markkanen was named the Finnish Athlete of the Year in 2023, as the first basketball player ever to win the award.

== Early life and career ==
Markkanen was born in Vantaa, but grew up in Jyväskylä. He played his junior years in the local team HoNsU (Hongikon Nuorisoseuran Urheilijat). In 2014, Markkanen moved to Helsinki and joined Helsinki Basketball Academy. He played for the academy team HBA-Märsky in the Finnish second-tier league from 2014 to 2016. He attended the Basketball Without Borders camp in 2015.

== College career ==
On 17 October 2015, Markkanen verbally committed to the NCAA Division I squad Arizona Wildcats prior to the 2016–17 season. Lauri signed a letter of intent to Arizona on 11 November. ESPN.com reported that the seven-foot Finn was considered "a possible one-and-done candidate for the NBA draft." He became the first Wildcats player since Mike Bibby to wear the jersey number 10. In January 2017, SB Nation regarded him as "the best shooting 7-footer college basketball has ever seen". Within the same month Markkanen was selected as Pac-12 Player of the Week as well as the Oscar Robertson National Player of the Week. He has also been named to the pre-season Karl Malone Award Watchlist, Naismith Award Watchlist, Wooden Award Watchlist, Wooden Award Midseason Top 25, Wayman Tisdale Award Midseason watch list, Oscar Robertson Award Midseason watch list, Karl Malone Award Finalist, Naismith Top 30 Finalist. Markkanen was among the 15 finalists for the John R. Wooden Award.

He recorded a career-high 30 points on 12 Jan against rival Arizona State. Also recording a career-high 13 rebounds three times against Northern Colorado, Washington State, and Washington. His career-high three blocks came against Arizona State in the regular season finale on 4 March 2017.

Markkanen was selected to the third team All-American team by the Associated Press, NBC Sports, USA Today, and the Sporting News on 6 March 2017. He was a first team All-Pac-12 selection, as well as first team All-Pac-12 Freshman team and first team All-Pac-12 team in Associated Press.

At the conclusion of his freshman season, Markkanen announced his intention to forgo his final three years of collegiate eligibility and enter the 2017 NBA draft.

== Professional career ==
=== Chicago Bulls (2017–2021) ===
Markkanen was drafted by the Minnesota Timberwolves with the seventh pick of the first round of the 2017 NBA draft. On draft night, his rights were traded to the Chicago Bulls along with Zach LaVine and Kris Dunn for Jimmy Butler and the rights to Justin Patton. On 5 July 2017, Markkanen signed with the Bulls on a four-year rookie scale contract worth $20.4 million.

==== 2017–18 season ====
On 19 October 2017, Markkanen made his NBA debut with the Bulls and scored 17 points. Markkanen then set an NBA record on 24 October, for most 3-pointers in the first three games of an NBA career with ten 3-pointers. Markkanen also asked former NBA player Brian Scalabrine to use his number 24, which Brian allowed. On 30 December, Markkanen scored a career-high 32 points and seven rebounds in a 119–107 win against the Indiana Pacers. On 10 January 2018, Markkanen played a career-high 46 minutes, scored a career-high 33 points along with a career-high eight 3-pointers in a double overtime 122–119 win against the New York Knicks. This made him the second seven-foot player to make eight three-pointers in a game (the first being Dirk Nowitzki). On 22 January, he grabbed a career-high 17 rebounds against the New Orleans Pelicans. Four days later, Markkanen blocked a career-high three shots against the Los Angeles Lakers.

After scoring seventeen points against the Milwaukee Bucks on 28 January 2018, Markkanen surpassed Hanno Möttölä (715) as the career leading scorer among NBA players from Finland. On 22 May 2018, he was named to the NBA All-Rookie First Team. He ended his rookie season leading the Bulls in rebounds with 7.5 and fourth in scoring with 15.2; his 14 double-doubles was third among rookies behind Kyle Kuzma and Ben Simmons.

==== 2018–19 season ====
Markkanen missed the first 23 games of the season. He had a career-high 19 rebounds in a loss to the Brooklyn Nets on 28 January. He also had 31 points and 18 rebounds in a win over Brooklyn on 8 February; a career-high 35 points along with 15 rebounds in a win over the Boston Celtics on 23 February; and 31 points and 17 rebounds in win over the Atlanta Hawks on 1 March. On 28 March, Markkanen was ruled out for the rest of the season after undergoing tests for his health problems, which he experienced in a 26 March game against the Toronto Raptors. In the 52 games he did play, he was second on the team with 18.7 points and first with 9.0 rebounds and 20 double-doubles (fourth in the NBA).

==== 2019–20 season ====
Markkanen began the season tying a career-high with 35 points along with 17 rebounds in a one-point loss to the Charlotte Hornets, the most opening-day points by a Chicago Bull since Michael Jordan in 1995.

==== 2020–21 season ====
On 30 January 2021, Markkanen scored a season-high 31 points on 12-of-18 shooting from the field and 6-of-11 from three in a 122–123 loss to the Portland Trail Blazers. After the Bulls added veteran big men Daniel Theis and Nikola Vučević to their roster to fortify their frontcourt, Markkanen lost his starting spot. On 29 March, Markkanen came off the bench for the first time during the season and the second in his 194 career games, he finished with 13 points, six rebounds and an assist across 22 minutes in a 102–116 loss to the Golden State Warriors. Since Markkanen moved to the second unit, he had been given a limited time and had been playing the small forward position. In a game against the Memphis Grizzlies on 12 April, Markkanen went scoreless for the first time in his career.

=== Cleveland Cavaliers (2021–2022) ===
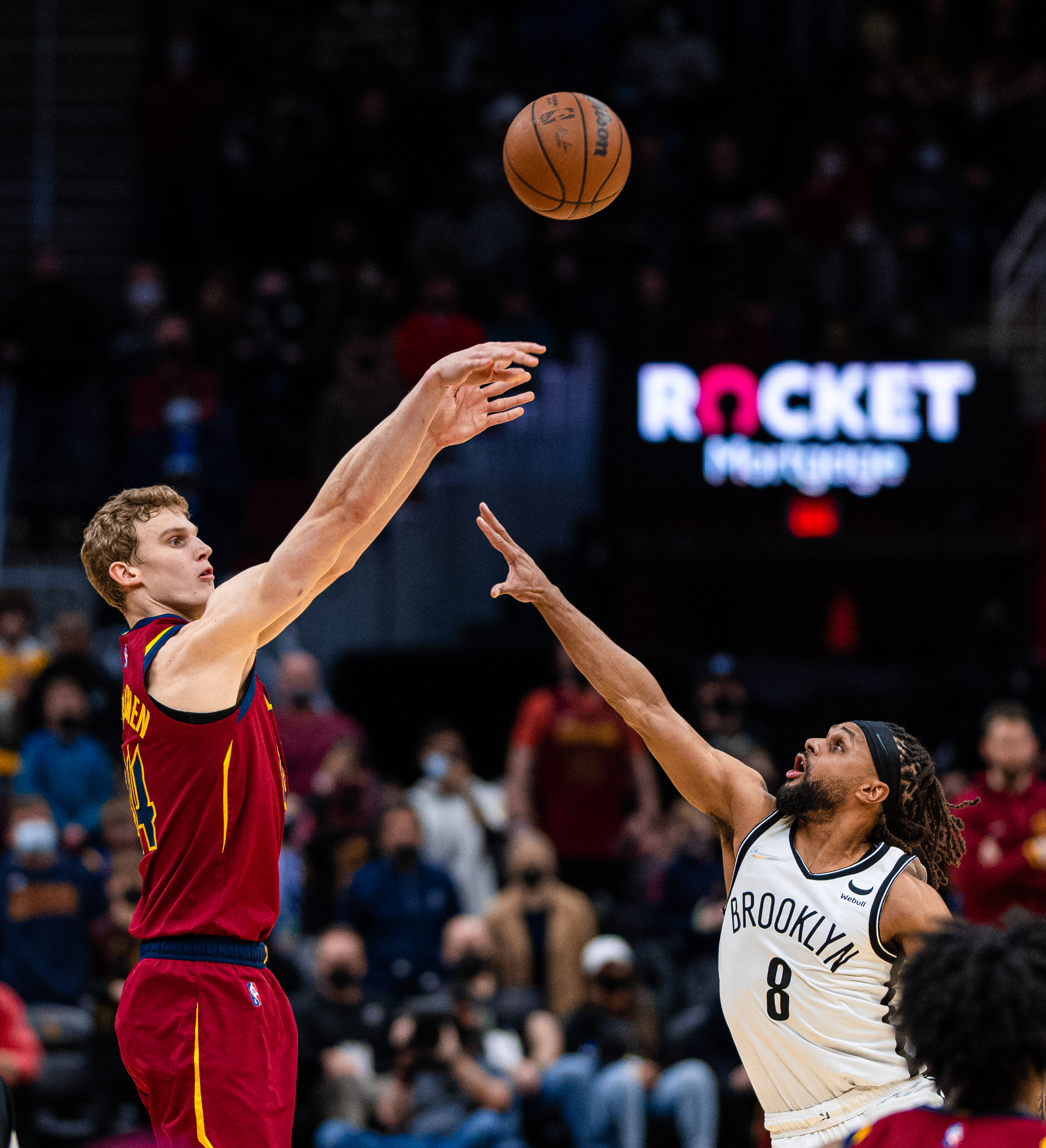
Markkanen attempts a 3-pointer over Patty Mills in a January 2022 game

On 28 August 2021, Markkanen was acquired by the Cleveland Cavaliers in a three-team sign-and-trade also involving the Portland Trail Blazers. Markkanen reportedly signed a four-year contract worth $67.5 million to complete the deal.

He made his Cavaliers debut on 20 October, recording ten points and nine rebounds in a 132–121 loss to the Memphis Grizzlies. On 18 March 2022, he scored a season-high 31 points, alongside ten rebounds and four steals, in a 119–116 overtime win over the Denver Nuggets.

During his lone season in Cleveland, Markkanen averaged 14.8 points, 5.7 rebounds, and 1.3 assists on 45% from the field and 36% on 3-point shots. Markkanen was the starting small forward for the Cavs for the majority of the season, and he along with rookie starting power forward Evan Mobley and starting center Jarrett Allen formed "Tower City" (a reference to the Cleveland RTA hub of the same name) going against the widely accepted NBA small ball strategy and instead using 3 big men in the starting lineup. The strategy paid off, as the Cavs ended the year 7th in defensive rating and Markkanen put up career highs in defensive metrics.

=== Utah Jazz (2022–present) ===
On 1 September 2022, Markkanen was traded, alongside Ochai Agbaji, Collin Sexton, three first-round picks, and two pick swaps, to the Utah Jazz in exchange for Donovan Mitchell.

==== 2022–23 season ====
On 18 November, Markkanen scored a then career-high 38 points on 15-of-18 shooting from the field, in a 134–133 win over the Phoenix Suns. On 22 December, Markkanen set a career-high with nine three-pointers on 13 attempts while also tying his then career-high 38 points in a 126–111 win over the Detroit Pistons.

On 5 January 2023, Markkanen put up a then career-high with 49 points, alongside eight rebounds, in a 131–114 win against the Houston Rockets. On 2 February, Markkanen was named to his first ever NBA All-Star game as a reserve for the Western Conference. Markkanen also become the first NBA All-Star born in a Nordic country. On 10 February, it was announced that Markkanen had been named a starter in the All-Star game as a result of injuries to Stephen Curry and Zion Williamson. On February 23, Markkanen scored 18 of his 43 points in the fourth quarter and grabbed 10 rebounds in a 120–119 overtime win over the Oklahoma City Thunder.

On April 24, 2023, Markkanen was named the 2022–23 NBA Most Improved Player, winning over Shai Gilgeous-Alexander and Jalen Brunson. During the season, Markkanen recorded 28 double-doubles in 66 games played, making it his single-season's record.

==== 2023–24 season ====
On 19 November 2023, Markkanen played his career's second-highest 50 minutes in a 140–137 double-overtime loss against the Phoenix Suns, scoring a season-high 38 points and grabbing another season-high 17 rebounds in the game. Markkanen suffered a hamstring injury and missed eight games, before returning to line-up on 14 December 2023.

On 15 December 2023, it was reported that Markkanen appeared to no longer be an off-limits, "untouchable" figure on the Jazz, concerning any trade possibilities, as the interest in him grew around the league. On 15 January 2024, Markkanen was named the NBA Western Conference Player of the Week, for the first time in his career. On 18 January 2024, it was reported that the Jazz are determined to build around Markkanen long-term as their franchise player, and are expected to re-negotiate and extend his current deal in summer 2024. He missed the last part of the season partly due to a shoulder injury and partly due to tanking.

On 7 August 2024, after Markkanen had been linked with trade speculations to the Golden State Warriors the whole summer, he signed a contract extension with the Jazz, on a five-year deal worth $238 million, surpassing Kimi Räikkönen to become the highest earning Finnish athlete ever.

==== 2024–25 season ====
On 23 October, in the first game of the season, Markkanen recorded 35 points and nine rebounds, in a 126–124 home loss against Memphis Grizzlies, the team coached by his fellow-countryman Tuomas Iisalo. For the rest of the season, he was mostly sidelined due to tanking, for which the Jazz were fined $100,000 by the league.

==== 2025–26 season ====
On 27 October, Markkanen put up a new career-high 51 points, along with 14 rebounds, in a 138–134 overtime win over the Phoenix Suns. He became the first Jazz player to break the 50-point mark in a regular season game since Karl Malone on 7 April 1998. On 16 November, Markkanen scored 47 points in a 150–147 double-overtime win over the Chicago Bulls. He had his second consecutive 40-point game for the Jazz, hitting that mark in back-to-back games for the first time in his NBA career. Towards the end of the regular season, the franchise continued tanking by sitting Markkanen and some other star players. On 12 February 2026, the Jazz were fined $500,000 by the NBA for sitting out Markkanen and Jaren Jackson Jr.. Markkanen played 42 games and averaged a career-high 26.7 points, 2.1 assists and 1 steal.

== National team career ==
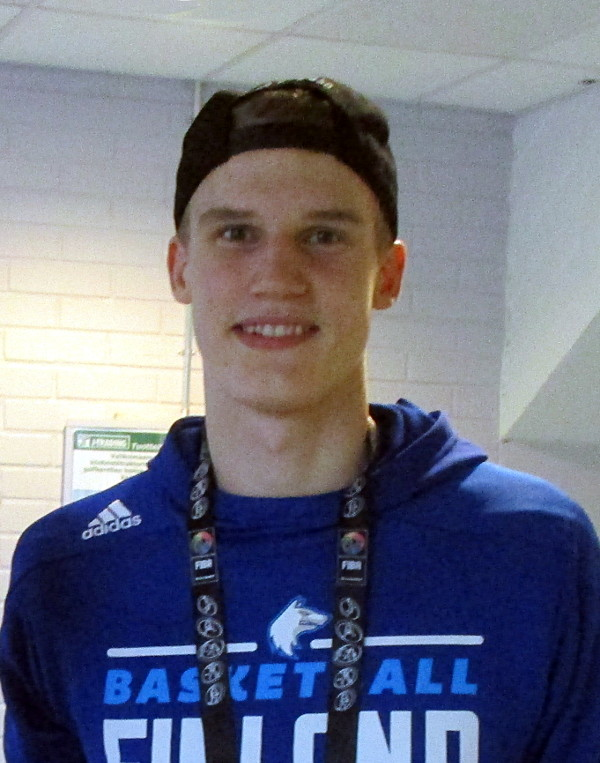
Markkanen with Finland U20 in 2016.

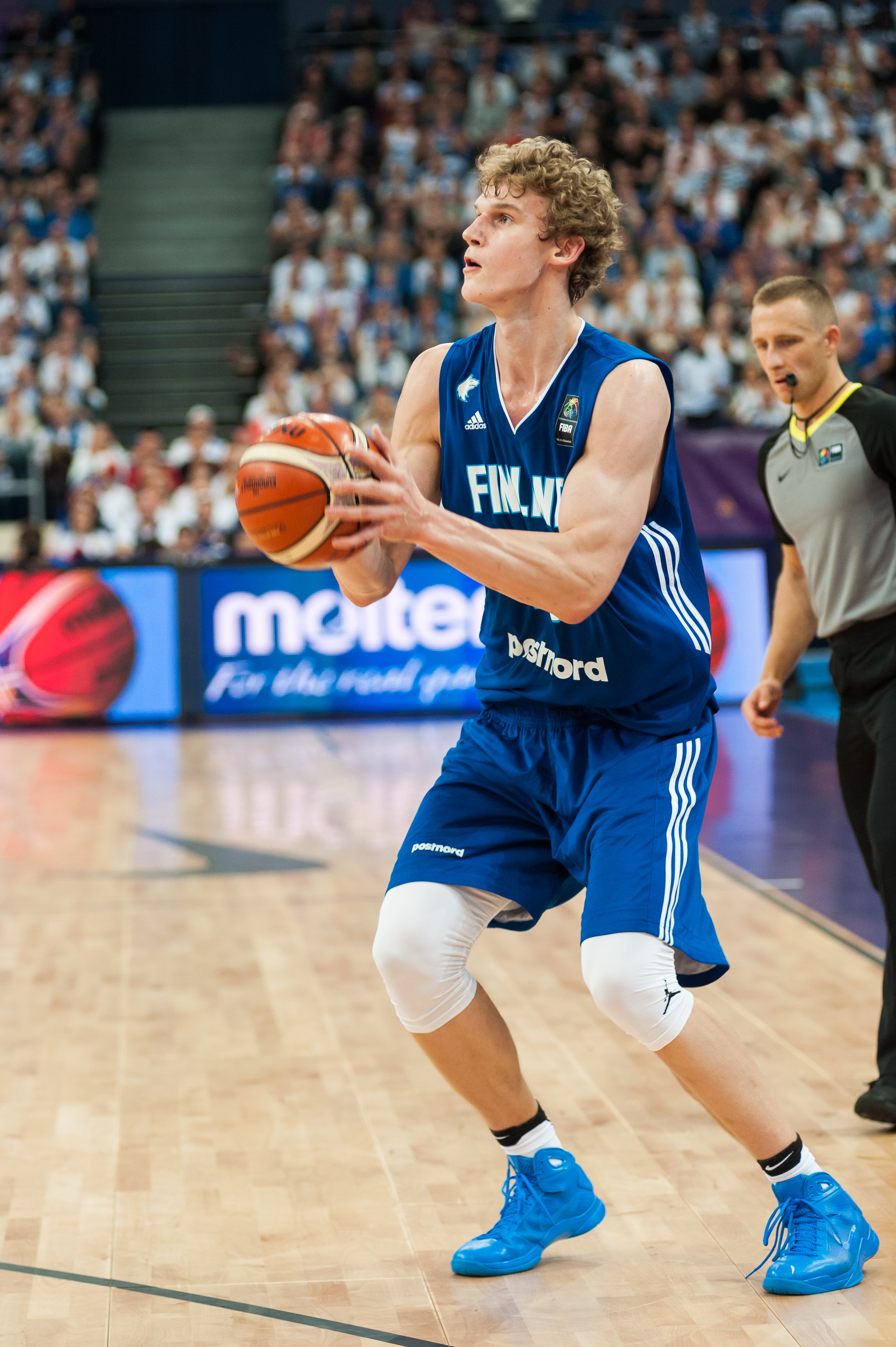
Markkanen in 2017 Eurobasket

=== Junior national team ===
Markkanen made his international debut with the Finnish U-18 national team at the 2015 FIBA Europe Under-18 Championship. Markkanen averaged 18.2 points per game and was the top scorer in the tournament. He was the top scorer also in 2016 FIBA Europe Under-20 Championship tournament for Finland U20 with an average of 24.9 points per game and was named to the All-Tournament Team.

=== Senior national team ===
Markkanen played with the Finland senior national team at EuroBasket 2017, which was partly held in his home country. He led his team to the round of 16 by averaging 19.5 points and 5.7 rebounds over 6 games.

He played his second EuroBasket tournament in 2022. In the Round of 16, Markkanen scored 43 points to lead Finland to a 94–86 win over Croatia, setting a new all-time record for a Finnish player at the EuroBasket. The win also led to Finland's first quarterfinal appearance in 55 years, the last being in 1967. Finland eventually lost in the following quarterfinals to Spain 100–90. Markkanen averaged 27.9 points on 54.2 per cent shooting and eight rebounds over seven games.

Markkanen was named in the Finnish national team roster to play 2023 FIBA World Cup. In the tournament, he averaged 24.8 points and 8 rebounds over five games, but after the losses in the group stage, Finland finished in 21st place out of 32 teams.

On August 8, 2025, Markkanen scored a career-high 48 points, going 17-from-23 from the field, in a 105–62 friendly win over Belgium in the preparation for EuroBasket 2025. He set a Finland national team record, surpassing his own previous record from 2022.

At the EuroBasket 2025, Markkanen averaged 23.1 points and 8.1 rebounds per game, leading Finland to a historic semi-final appearance. Finland ultimately finished 4th, making it the best result in the country's history. During the tournament, Markkanen surpassed 500 points scored in EuroBasket career, as the second Finnish player behind Timo Lampén. He was also named in the All-Tournament Second Team.

== Career statistics ==
Legend
GP	Games played	GS	Games started	MPG	Minutes per game
FG%	Field goal percentage	3P%	3-point field goal percentage	FT%	Free throw percentage
RPG	Rebounds per game	APG	Assists per game	SPG	Steals per game
BPG	Blocks per game	PPG	Points per game	**Bold**	Career high

=== NBA ===
==== Regular season ====
Year	Team	GP	GS	MPG	FG%	3P%	FT%	RPG	APG	SPG	BPG	PPG
2017–18	Chicago	**68**	**68**	29.7	.434	.362	.843	7.5	1.2	.6	**.6**	15.2
2018–19	Chicago	52	51	32.3	.430	.361	.872	**9.0**	1.4	.7	**.6**	18.7
2019–20	Chicago	50	50	29.8	.425	.344	.824	6.3	1.5	.8	.5	14.7
2020–21	Chicago	51	26	25.8	.480	**.402**	.826	5.3	.9	.5	.3	13.6
2021–22	Cleveland	61	61	30.8	.445	.358	.868	5.7	1.3	.7	.5	14.8
2022–23	Utah	66	66	**34.4**	**.499**	.391	.875	8.6	1.9	.6	**.6**	25.6
2023–24	Utah	55	55	33.1	.480	.399	**.899**	8.2	2.0	.9	.5	23.2
2024–25	Utah	47	47	31.4	.423	.346	.876	5.9	1.5	.7	.4	19.0
2025–26	Utah	42	42	**34.4**	.477	.355	.896	6.9	**2.1**	**1.0**	.5	**26.7**
Career		492	466	31.3	.458	.370	.871	7.1	1.5	.8	.5	18.9
All-Star		1	1	25.9	.462	.167	—	7.0	.0	.0	.0	13.0

=== College ===
Year	Team	GP	GS	MPG	FG%	3P%	FT%	RPG	APG	SPG	BPG	PPG
2016–17	Arizona	37	37	30.8	.492	.423	.835	7.2	.9	.4	.5	15.6

=== National team ===
Team	Tournament	Pos.	GP	PPG	RPG	APG
Finland	EuroBasket 2017	11th	6	19.5	5.7	0.7
Finland	EuroBasket 2022	7th	7	27.9	8.1	2.4
Finland	2023 FIBA World Cup	21st	5	24.8	8.0	1.2
Finland	EuroBasket 2025	4th	9	23.1	8.1	2.2

== NBA records ==
- Most consecutive games with a made three by a seven-footer (48 games)
- The only player in NBA history with 100 dunks and 200 threes in a single season

== Personal life ==
He is the son of Pekka and Riikka Markkanen (née Ellonen), who both were professional basketball players, and has two brothers, former professional basketball player Miikka and professional footballer Eero. In February 2018, Markkanen and his wife Verna Aho had a son together. In October 2020, their second child was born. In late-November 2024, Markkanen revealed on social media that their third child was born.

After he was drafted in 2017, Markkanen signed a multi-year sponsorship shoe deal with Nike. In December 2023, Markkanen signed an extended and upgraded deal with Nike, including customized personal edition shoes, featuring "LM23" and "Finnisher" on each heel.

Markkanen began his compulsory military service on 17 April 2023, at the military base of Santahamina in Helsinki, Finland. He finished his service on 29 September 2023.

Markkanen is a fan of ice hockey, having played the sport casually with friends multiple times a week while growing up, and attends National Hockey League games when he is able to on the road. On 8 October 2024, Markkanen was a featured guest during the NHL expansion team Utah Mammoth's (then Utah Hockey Club) inaugural game and joined owner Ryan Smith on the ice for the ceremonial opening puck drop.

== See also ==
- List of NBA career free throw percentage leaders
