= Finnish Basketball Hall of Fame =

Finnish Basketball Academy
- Established: 2009
- Location: Finland
- Type: Hall of Fame

The Finnish Basketball Hall of Fame is a hall of fame that is the highest honor that is bestowed upon people that have impacted the sport of basketball in Finland. New Hall of Fame members are chosen by the Hall's board of experts, coming from the Finnish Basketball Federation, the Finnish Basketball Foundation, the Sports Museum of Finland, among others. The first members were inducted in 2009.

In both August 2015, and 2016, four new people were inducted. In 2017, there were six new inductees, in 2018, four, and in 2019, eight.

== Members ==
Members of Finnish Basketball Hall of Fame
Induction Year	Name
2009	Kari Liimo
2009	Raimo Lindholm
2009	Kalevi Tuominen
2010	Jouko Heikkinen
2010	Gerald Lee Sr.
2010	Risto Lignell
2010	Anssi Rauramo
2010	Kalevi Sarkalahti
2010	Tapio Sten
2012	Hilkka Hakola
2012	Esko Karhunen
2012	Pentti Salmi
2013	Timo Lampén
2013	Lea Hakala
2013	Robert Petersen
2013	Jorma Pilkevaara
2014	Erkki Hiltunen
2014	Kari-Pekka Klinga
2014	Pertti Laanti
2014	Eero Saarinen
2015	Terhi Airas-Järventaus
2015	Teijo Finneman
2015	Larry Pounds
2015	Juhani Salmenkylä
2016	Martti Liimo
2016	Heikki Kasko
2016	Petri Kärkäinen
2016	Leena Martin (née Vestala)
2017	Martti Huhtamäki
2017	Mikko Koskinen
2017	Sakari Pehkonen
2017	Anja Suomalainen (née Hellsten)
2017	Timo Suviranta
2017	Veikko Vainio
2018	Hillevi Eskelinen
2018	Risto Kala
2018	Jarmo Laitinen
2018	Eino Ojanen
2019	Niilo Tammisalo
2019	Vilho Nuoreva
2019	Nils Fabricius
2019	Seppo Kuusela
2019	Tom Hynninen
2019	Risto Piipari
2019	Seija Leino
2019	Reija Vesa
2025	Leon Huff
2025	Minna Myllylä
2025	Mikael Salmi
2025	Oiva Virtanen
2026	Henrik Dettmannin
2026	Annamaija Keturi
2026	Juha Luhtanen
2026	Virpi Leino (née Juntunen)
2026	Alarik Vihersola

== See also ==
- Finnish Basketball Player of the Year
- College Basketball Hall of Fame
- Basketball Hall of Fame
  - List of members of the Naismith Memorial Basketball Hall of Fame
  - List of players in the Naismith Memorial Basketball Hall of Fame
  - List of coaches in the Naismith Memorial Basketball Hall of Fame
- FIBA Hall of Fame
  - List of members of the FIBA Hall of Fame
- EuroLeague Hall of Fame
- Italian Basketball Hall of Fame
- Spanish Basketball Hall of Fame
- Greek Basket League Hall of Fame
- French Basketball Hall of Fame
- VTB United League Hall of Fame
- Australian Basketball Hall of Fame
- Philippine Basketball Association Hall of Fame
- Women's Basketball Hall of Fame

== Sources ==
- Finnish Basketball Hall of Fame Official Site Finnish Basketball Museum (in Finnish)
