= Basketball Hall of Fame (disambiguation) =

The Naismith Memorial Basketball Hall of Fame is an American history museum and hall of fame for the sport of basketball.

Basketball Hall of Fame may also refer to:

- Australian Basketball Hall of Fame
- EuroLeague Hall of Fame
- FIBA Hall of Fame in Alcobendas, Spain
- Finnish Basketball Hall of Fame
- French Basketball Hall of Fame
- Greek Basket League Hall of Fame
- Indiana Basketball Hall of Fame in New Castle, Indiana
- Italian Basketball Hall of Fame
- National Collegiate Basketball Hall of Fame in Kansas City, Missouri
- Philippine Basketball Association Hall of Fame
- Spanish Basketball Hall of Fame
- VTB United League Hall of Fame
- Women's Basketball Hall of Fame in Knoxville, Tennessee
