= Krešimir Ćosić =

Croatian basketball player and coach

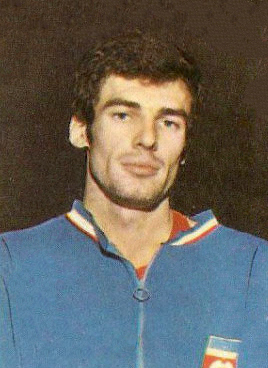
- Ćosić with the Yugoslavian basketball team in 1970

Personal information
- Born: 26 November 1948 Zagreb, PR Croatia, Yugoslavia
- Died: 25 May 1995 (aged 46) Baltimore, Maryland, U.S.
- Listed height: 211 cm (6 ft 11 in)
- Listed weight: 96 kg (212 lb)

Career information
- College: BYU (1970–1973)
- NBA draft: 1973: 5th round, 84th overall pick
- Drafted by: Los Angeles Lakers
- Playing career: 1964–1983
- Position: Center
- Coaching career: 1976–1991

Career history

Playing
- 1964–1969; 1973–1976: Zadar
- 1976–1978: AŠK Olimpija
- 1978–1980: Sinudyne Bologna
- 1980–1983: Cibona

Career highlights
- As player: 2× EuroBasket MVP (1971, 1975); 6× FIBA European Selection (1968, 1970–1974); FIBA Saporta Cup champion (1982); 2× Italian League champion (1979, 1980); 6× Yugoslav League champion (1965, 1967, 1968, 1974, 1975, 1982); 3× Yugoslav Cup winner (1981–1983); Croatian Sportsman of the Year (1980); 50 Greatest EuroLeague Contributors (2008); Croatian Lifetime Achievement in Sport (2002); FIBA Order of Merit (1994); FIBA's 50 Greatest Players (1991); Third-team All-American – UPI (1972); 2× Fourth-team All-American – NABC (1972, 1973); 3× First-team All-WAC (1971–1973); No. 11 retired by BYU Cougars
- Stats at Basketball Reference
- Basketball Hall of Fame
- FIBA Hall of Fame
- Collegiate Basketball Hall of Fame
Medals
Men's basketball
Representing Yugoslavia
Summer Olympic Games
| Gold medal – first place | 1980 Moscow |
| Silver medal – second place | 1968 Mexico City |
| Silver medal – second place | 1976 Montreal |
FIBA World Cup
| Gold medal – first place | 1970 Yugoslavia |
| Gold medal – first place | 1978 Philippines |
| Silver medal – second place | 1967 Uruguay |
| Silver medal – second place | 1974 Puerto Rico |
FIBA Eurobasket
| Gold medal – first place | 1973 Spain |
| Gold medal – first place | 1975 Yugoslavia |
| Gold medal – first place | 1977 Belgium |
| Silver medal – second place | 1969 Italy |
| Silver medal – second place | 1971 West Germany |
| Silver medal – second place | 1981 Czechoslovakia |
| Bronze medal – third place | 1979 Italy |
Mediterranean Games
| Gold medal – first place | 1967 Tunis |
| Gold medal – first place | 1971 Izmir |
European U-18 Championship
| Silver medal – second place | 1966 Italy | Under-18 |

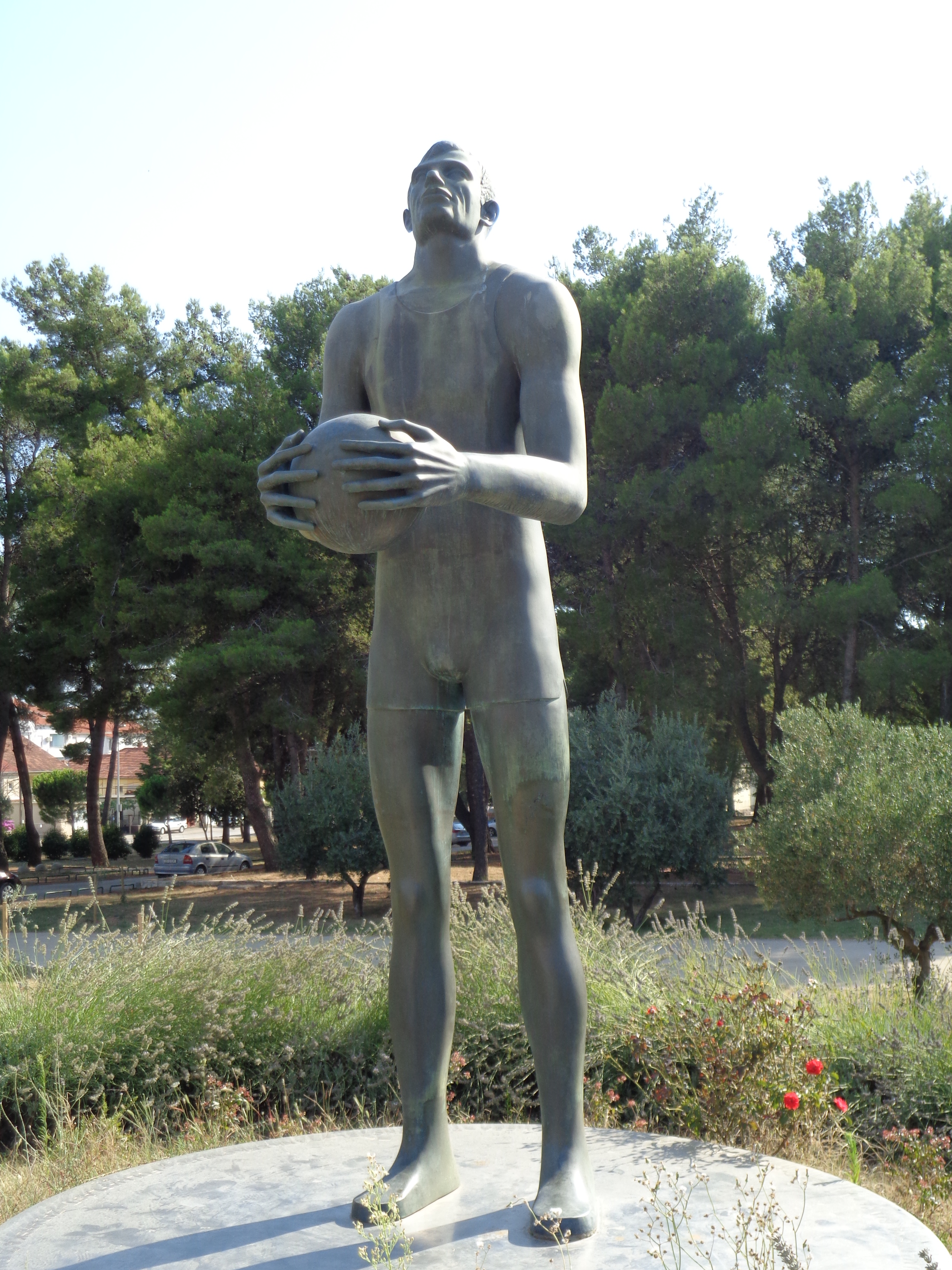
Ćosić statue at Višnjik Sports Centre in Zadar

Krešimir "Krešo" Ćosić (Croatian pronunciation: [krěʃimir t͡ɕɔ̌ːsit͡ɕ]; 26 November 1948 – 25 May 1995) was a Croatian professional basketball player and coach. He was a collegiate All-American at Brigham Young University. He was the first basketball player in the world to play all five positions.

In 1996, Ćosić became only the third international player ever elected to the Naismith Memorial Basketball Hall of Fame (the second male player). He is one of 62 people in the world that received the FIBA Order of Merit. In 2006, he was inducted into the College Basketball Hall of Fame, and in 2007, he was also an inaugural member of the FIBA Hall of Fame. The Croatian Basketball Cup, and KK Zadar's home arena, are named after him. Ćosić was voted best Croatian athlete of the 20th century twice; by Croatian Sports News and by Croatian National Television.

Ćosić was a notable church leader and missionary of the Church of Jesus Christ of Latter-day Saints, as well as the deputy ambassador of Croatia to the U.S., in Washington, D.C.

== Early club career ==
Ćosić was born in Zagreb (PR Croatia, FPR Yugoslavia), on 26 November 1948, to Ante and Darinka Ćosić. He was raised in Zadar, and in 1965, he started his club basketball playing career, by playing with KK Zadar. While with Zadar, he won three Yugoslav League titles: in 1965, 1967, and 1968.

== College career and NBA draft ==
In the summer of 1968, Ćosić was in a European team with Finnish player Veikko Vainio. Vainio, a student at Brigham Young University (BYU), told him about life in college, and invited him to play for the BYU Cougars. Ćosić accepted this invitation, and moved to the United States, in 1969. In his freshman year, he played in 12 games for the freshman team, averaging 17.4 points and 12.6 rebounds per game. In his sophomore year, he averaged 15.1 points and 12.6 rebounds per game, leading BYU to the 1971 WAC Championship.

In his junior year, he again led his team to the WAC Championship, averaging 22.3 points and 12.8 rebounds per game, and being awarded All-American Honors by the United Press International, making him the first non-American player to achieve that. In the 1972 NBA draft, he was picked by the Portland Trail Blazers, in the 10th round (144th overall), but he opted to stay with BYU.

As a senior, he averaged 20.2 points and 9.5 rebounds per game, and again was given All-American Honors, by the United Press International. His career college basketball averages were 18.9 points, and 11.8 rebounds per game.

The Marriott Center, at BYU, was built during Ćosić's career at BYU, as the Smith Field House could not accommodate the growing number of fans, so there is a saying about the Marriott Center – Stan Watts built it, Marriott paid for it, and Krešo filled it.

== Late club career ==
At the 1973 NBA draft, Ćosić was picked by the Los Angeles Lakers, in the 5th round (84th overall). He rejected several professional offers from the NBA and ABA, and returned home to Croatia, where he again played with KK Zadar, from 1973 to 1976. He was responsible for bringing the first American to play for a Yugoslav club team. He brought Doug Richards to Zadar.

After that, he played with AŠK Olimpija (1976–1978), with Virtus Bologna (1978–1980), and with Cibona Zagreb (1980–1983). Ćosić helped lead Cibona to their first European Cup.

== National team career ==
Ćosić made his national team debut for Team Yugoslavia, at the age of 17, after being called up to the senior team by head coach Ranko Žeravica. He won a silver medal at the 1967 FIBA World Championship. At the 1968 Summer Olympics, he won another silver medal.

Ćosić holds the record for playing the most games for a national team (303) and was part of three generations and holds the most basketball awards/medals in Croatia. In total, Ćosić played in four Summer Olympic Games: 1968, 1972, 1976, and 1980 in Moscow, when he led his team as captain to the gold medal. He previously had led Yugoslavia to a pair of FIBA World Cup gold medals, at the 1970 FIBA World Championship, and at the 1978 FIBA World Championship.

== Coaching career ==
He first coached the Zadar team upon returning from BYU in 1973. However, he found it too exhausting being a coach, club director and player. In 1976 he coached the Ljubljana Brest team and was at the same time a player for Zadar (both teams played in the same league). Following his playing days, Ćosić returned to coaching, and he led the senior Yugoslav national team to a silver medal at the 1988 Summer Olympics in Seoul, and two bronze medals at the 1986 FIBA World Championship, and the 1987 EuroBasket. Even though no one agreed with him, Ćosić insisted on including young players in the national team and was the first to give them a chance, they included: Dino Rađa, Vlade Divac and Toni Kukoč.

He also recognized a young talent in Dejan Bodiroga, whom he helped set off his career.

== Off the basketball court ==
=== Diplomacy ===
Ćosić turned down coaching offers so that he could help Croatia during war-time in the early 1990s. He was positioned in the embassy of Croatia to the USA, as the deputy ambassador in Washington D.C. He was the only person at the time able to help in fixing misconceptions about the war. His strong connections helped Croatia and he received the Freedom Award for contributing to advancing peace and reconciliation to all ethnic groups in Croatia.

=== Church life ===
During his time at Brigham Young University, Ćosić converted to the Church of Jesus Christ of Latter-day Saints, and he later served as the presiding priesthood holder in post-communist Croatia. He was baptized by Hugh Nibley, one of the Church's most celebrated scholars. Ćosić also introduced the Church to Yugoslavia. He translated the Book of Mormon and Doctrine and Covenants into Croatian. According to Nibley, Ćosić told him, "There are a hundred reasons why I should not join the Church, and only one reason why I should - because it is true."

=== Writer ===
Ćosić was known to carry a suitcase full of books wherever he traveled. He was an atypical athlete, reading, analyzing and noting. He always had the latest gadget at hand and was obsessed with technology. He listened to classical music and loved the theater and arts. In the 1980s, he started writing his autobiography which was never completed. His daughter, Ana, published his writings in May 2019 in Croatian under the book name Play, Believe, Live. The book gives an inside view of Ćosić's sports career and his theories about sports in general.

== Death ==
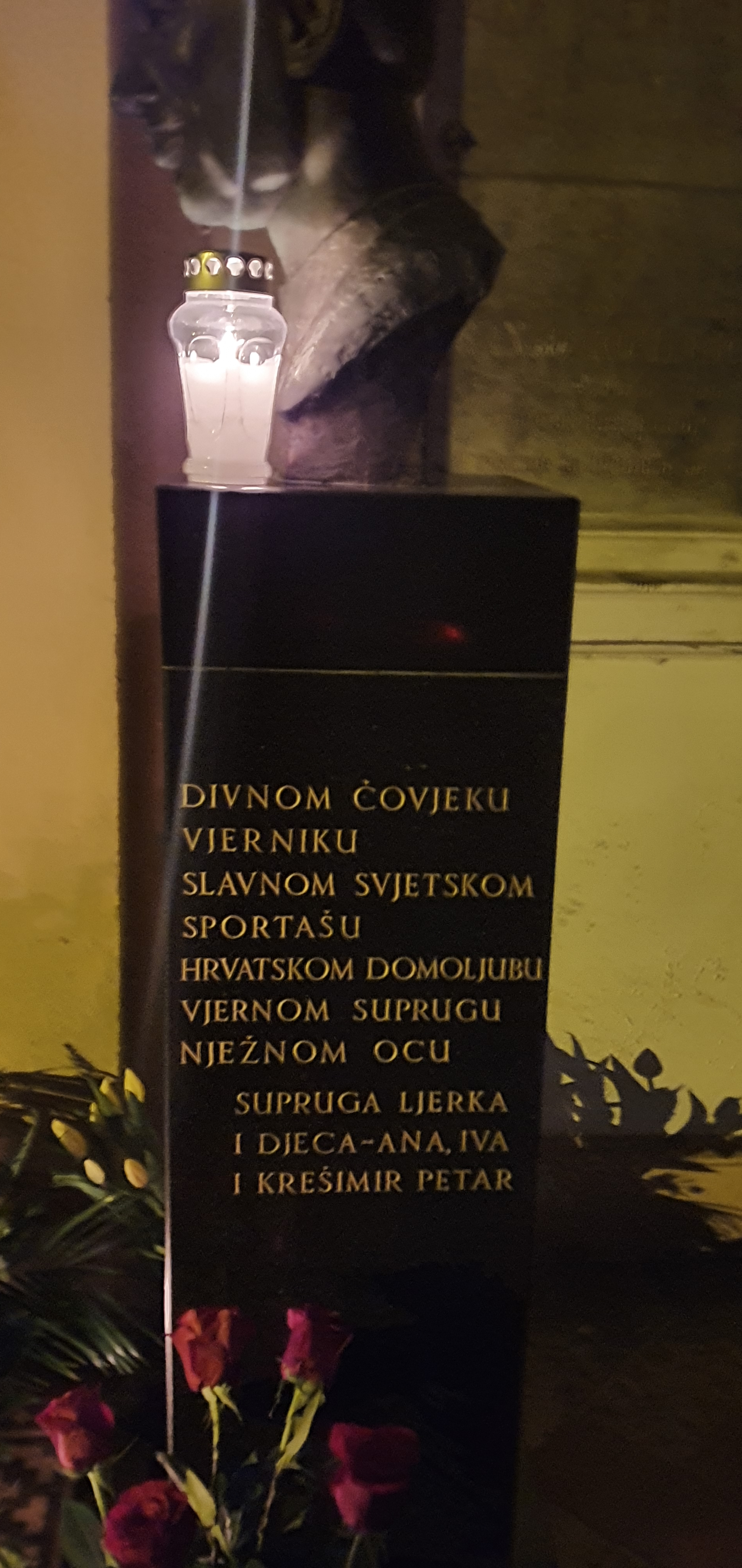

In the years following his career in basketball, Ćosić worked in the United States, as a diplomat, at the Croatian embassy in Washington, D.C., having helped secure the land where the embassy now stands. Ćosić died in Baltimore, Maryland, in 1995, of non-Hodgkin lymphoma. He was buried in the Mirogoj Cemetery, under the Arcades, in Zagreb, Croatia. People came from all over former Yugoslavia to his funeral, even though there was a war at the time. He was survived by his wife, Ljerka, his two daughters, and his son, Krešimir.

== Honors ==
- The Croatian National Basketball Cup and KK Zadar's Home Arena are named after him.
- He was a 6× participant of FIBA All-Star Games, playing on the side of European Selection roster.
- He is one of top medalists of the FIBA World Cup, with 4 medals.
- He was named the FIBA EuroBasket MVP, in 1971 and 1975.
- He was named the Croatian Sportsmen of the Year, in 1980.
- He was inducted into the BYU Hall of Fame, in 1983.
- He was named one of FIBA's 50 Greatest Players, in 1991.
- He received the Freedom Award, in Utah, 1993.
- He was awarded the FIBA Order of Merit, in 1994.
- He was enshrined into the Basketball Hall of Fame, in 1996.
- He was inducted into Utah Basketball Hall of Fame, in 2001.
- He was awarded with the Croatian Lifetime Achievement in Sport, in 2002.
- On 4 March 2006, Ćosić became just the second men's Basketball player to have his jersey retired by BYU (the other was Danny Ainge).
- In 2006, he was enshrined into the College Basketball Hall of Fame.
- In 2007, he was enshrined into the FIBA Hall of Fame.
- He was named one of the 50 Greatest EuroLeague Contributors, in 2008.

== Landmarks ==
- The Croatian landmark formerly known as Califfi Castle now bears his name in his honor.
- The Krešimir Ćosić Sports Arena in Zadar, the most versatile Sports Hall in Croatia.
- There is a statue looking at the Krešimir Ćosić Sports Arena in Zadar.
- There is a square in Zagreb, Croatia, that bears his name (Trg Krešimira Ćosića).
- There is a street in Zadar that bears his name.
- There is a street in Vukovar that bears his name.
- There is a street in Dobropoljana, Island Pašman that bears his name.
- There is a Memorial Basket in Zadar where he started his Basketball Career as a child.

== See also ==
- Yugoslav First Federal Basketball League career stats leaders
