= Risto Kala =

Finnish basketball player (1941–2021)

Personal information
- Nationality: Finnish
- Born: 24 July 1941; Helsinki, Finland
- Died: 25 November 2021 (aged 80); Vantaa, Finland

Sport
- Sport: Basketball

Risto Kala (24 July 1941 – 25 November 2021) was a Finnish basketball player. He competed in the men's tournament at the 1964 Summer Olympics. Kala was SM-sarja top scorer in 1968–1969 season. Representing Pantterit he won two Finnish championships. In 2018, Kala was inducted to Finnish Basketball Hall of Fame. Kala died in November 2021, at the age of 80.
