= Kari Liimo =

Finnish basketball player (born 1944)

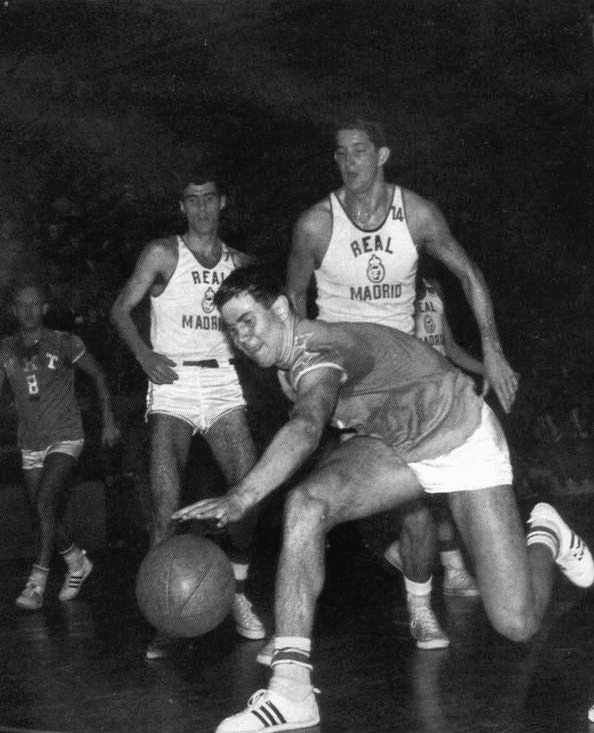
- Liimo (in the front, with the ball), playing in a EuroLeague game against Real Madrid, in 1965.

Personal information
- Born: 6 March 1944 (age 82) Lappeenranta, Finland
- Listed height: 6 ft 8 in (2.03 m)
- Listed weight: 210 lb (95 kg)

Career information
- College: BYU (1965–1969)
- NBA draft: 1969: 7th round, 97th overall pick
- Drafted by: Los Angeles Lakers
- Playing career: 1959–1976
- Position: Power forward
- Coaching career: 1975–2007

Career history

Playing
- 1959–1966: HKT
- 1970–1971: Turun Riento
- 1971–1973: HKT
- 1973–1976: Honka Playboys

Coaching
- Playhonka
- KTP

Career highlights
- As a player: 7× Finnish SM Championship Series champion (1961–1965, 1974, 1976); 2× Finnish Cup winner (1974, 1975); 3× Finnish SM Championship Series Top Scorer (1965, 1970, 1971); 6× Finnish Player of the Year (1963–1965, 1969–1971); Finnish Basketball Hall of Fame (2009); All-WAC First Team (1967); All-WAC Second Team (1968); All-WAC Honorable Mention (1969); As a head coach: 6× Finnish SM Championship Series champion (1976, 1979, 1988, 1991, 1993, 1994); 4× Finnish Cup winner (1977, 1987, 1990, 1993); 3× Finnish SM Championship Series Coach of the Year (1988, 1991, 1993)
- Stats at Basketball Reference
Medals
Men's Basketball
Representing Finland
FIBA European Olympic Qualifying Tournament
Gold medal – first place	1964 Switzerland
Nordic Championship
Gold medal – first place	1962
Gold medal – first place	1964
Gold medal – first place	1970
Head coach for Finland
Nordic Championship
Gold medal – first place	1983

Kari Tapani Liimo (born 6 March 1944) is a Finnish former basketball player and coach. During his playing career, liimo was named the Finnish Player of the Year six times. He was inducted into the Finnish Basketball Hall of Fame in 2009.

== College playing career ==
Liimo attended Brigham Young University, where he played college basketball with the BYU Cougars, from 1965 to 1969. While at BYU, he was an All-Western Athletic Conference First Team selection in 1967, an All-Western Athletic Conference Second Team selection in 1968, and All-Western Athletic Conference Honorable Mention selection in 1969.

== Club playing career ==
Liimo won the Finnish SM Championship Series championship with HKT, in the years 1961, 1962, 1963, 1964, and 1965. After that, he moved to the United States, to play college basketball.

After he finished his college career, Liimo was selected in the 1969 ABA draft, by the Minnesota Pipers of the American Basketball Association (ABA). Liimo became the first Finnish basketball player that was drafted by the National Basketball Association (NBA), after he was selected by the Los Angeles Lakers in the 1969 NBA draft, with the 12th pick of the 7th round (the 97th pick overall). However, Liimo never played in the NBA, as doing so would have prevented him from playing for Finland's national team. So, he decided to keep playing club basketball in Finland instead.

Liimo went on to win two more Finnish championships, with the Honka Playboys, in 1974 and 1976, with the 1976 championship coming as a player-coach. He was the Finnish SM Championship's Top Scorer, in the years 1965, 1970, and 1971. Liimo played in a total of 251 games in the SM series, in which he scored a total of 4,742 points, for a career scoring average of 18.9 points per game. His highest single season scoring average was in the 1964–65 season, when averaged was 30.7 points per game. His career single game scoring record was 46 points, which happened during a game in 1965.

== National team playing career ==
Liimo was a member of the senior men's Finnish national team. With Finland, he competed at the following major FIBA tournaments: the 1961 FIBA EuroBasket, the 1963 FIBA EuroBasket, the 1964 FIBA European Olympic Qualifying Tournament, the 1964 Tokyo Summer Olympics, the 1965 FIBA EuroBasket, the 1967 FIBA EuroBasket, and the 1968 FIBA European Olympic Qualifying Tournament.

While representing Finland, he won the Nordic Championship in 1962, 1964, and 1970. With Finland, Liimo had a total of 154 caps, in which he scored a total of 2,462 points, for a scoring average of 16.0 points per game. Liimo holds the senior Finnish national team's record for the most career points scored.

== Coaching career ==
=== Club coaching career ===
After he finished his playing career, Liimo worked as a basketball coach. He began coaching first as a player-coach with the Finnish basketball club Honka Playboys. As a player-coach with Honka Playboys, he won the Finnish SM Championship Series championship in 1976. While working as just the team's head coach, he won the Finnish championship again in the year 1979.

He went on to win four more Finnish championships with KTP, in the years 1988, 1991, 1993, and 1994. With KTP, he also won the Finnish Cup title four times, in the years 1977, 1987, 1990, and 1993. He was named the Finnish Championship's Coach of the Year three times, in the years 1988, 1991, and 1993.

=== National team coaching career ===
Liimo was the head coach of the senior men's Finnish national team, from 1982 to 1984. He led Finland to the Nordic Basketball Championship title in 1983.

== Personal life ==
Liimo's older brother, Martti Liimo, was also a basketball player, and the two brothers were teammates.
