= Esko Karhunen =

Finnish basketball player (1928–2016)

Personal information
- Born: 4 January 1928 Helsinki, Finland
- Died: 8 March 2016 (aged 88) Helsinki, Finland
- Listed height: 6 ft 0 in (1.83 m)

Career history
- 1944–1960: Kiri-Veikot / HOK-Veikot / Pantterit

Career highlights
- Member of Finnish Basketball Hall of Fame; 1952 Summer Olympics (15th); 13 SM-sarja championships

Esko Ensio ”Sir Emal” Karhunen (4 January 1928 – 8 March 2016) was a Finnish basketball player and contributor.

The 183-centimetre-tall (6 ft 0 in) Karhunen spent his whole SM-sarja career at Pantterit basketball club, and its predecessors, in Helsinki, and was in a record 13 Finnish championship-winning teams. He was also capped eight times for the Finland men's national team and represented his country at the 1952 Summer Olympics in Helsinki.

After his career as a player, Karhunen was a basketball contributor in Pantterit. He organized a practice tournament which was played between 1971–2000 and brought the Harlem Globetrotters to Finland.

Karhunen was inducted into the Finnish Basketball Hall of Fame in 2012. Karhunen died on 8 March 2016 in Helsinki at 88 years of age.
