= Seppo Kuusela =

Finnish basketball player/coach and handball player

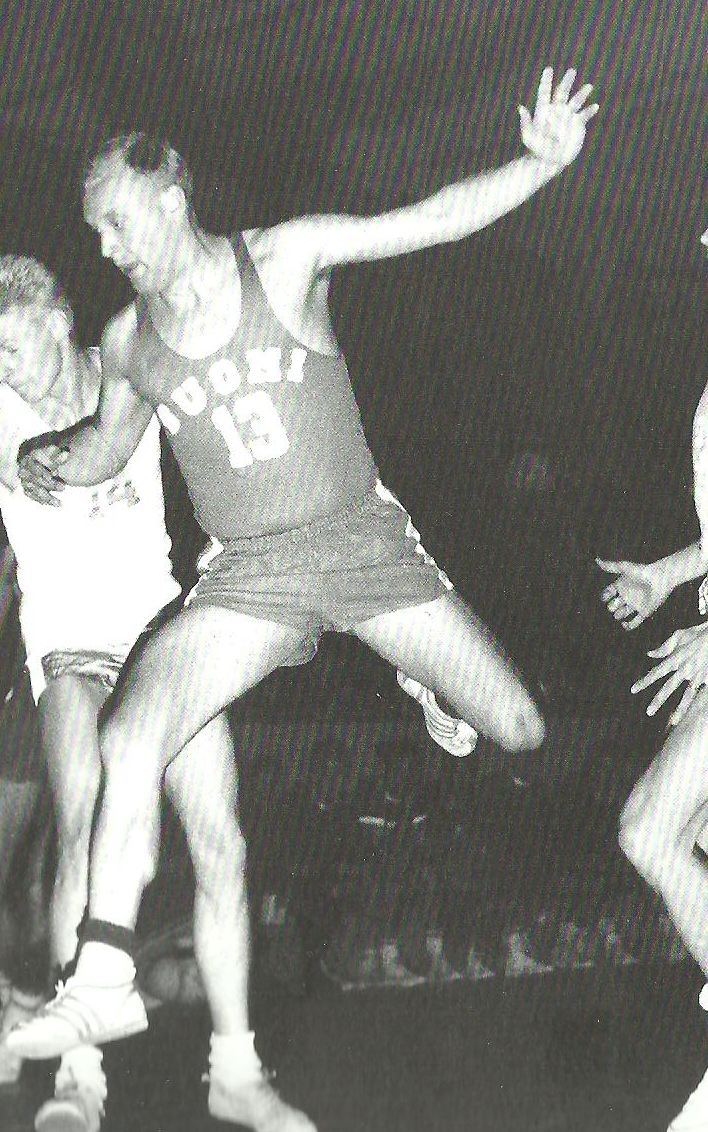

Personal information
- Born: 25 February 1934; Helsinki, Finland
- Died: 16 October 2014 (aged 80)
- Listed height: 6 ft 0 in (1.83 m)
- Position: Point guard / shooting guard

Career history
- 1952–1963: Pantterit
- 1963–1969: Tapion Honka

Career highlights and awards
- As basketball player: 9× Finnish League champion (1952–1957, 1959, 1968, 1969); Finnish Cup winner (1968); 2× Finnish League Top Scorer (1960, 1961); 2× Finnish Player of the Year (1959, 1960); As basketball coach: 3× Finnish League champion (1970, 1971, 1972)

Seppo Kuusela (25 February 1934 – 16 October 2014) was a Finnish basketball player, basketball coach, and handball player. At 182 cm tall, he played at the point guard and shooting guard positions, as a basketball player. He was twice voted the Finnish Basketball Player of the Year, in 1959 and 1960, by Finnish sports journalists.

== Club basketball career ==
Kuusela played in the top-tier level Finnish basketball league, the SM-sarja, winning multiple Finnish League championships during his club career.

== National basketball team career ==
Alongside club competitions, Kuusela also represented the senior Finnish national basketball team, at five EuroBasket tournaments (1955, 1957, 1959, 1961, and 1963).

== Trophies and awards ==
=== Basketball player ===
- 9× Finnish League Champion: (1952, 1953, 1954, 1955, 1956, 1957, 1959, 1968, 1969)
  - Finnish League Runner-up: (1967)
  - Finnish League 3rd Place: (1973)
- 2× Finnish Player of the Year: (1959, 1960)
- 2× Finnish League Top Scorer: (1960, 1961)
- Finnish Cup Winner: (1968)

=== Handball player ===
- 2× Finnish Handball Championship Champion: (1953, 1955)

=== Basketball coach ===
- 3× Finnish League Champion: (1970, 1971, 1972)

=== Other ===
- Finnish Basketball Hall of Fame inductee 2019

== Sources ==
- Seppo Kuusela Finnish Basketball Association
- National Team Stats Finnish Basketball Association
