= Pekka Markkanen =

Finnish basketball player (born 1967)

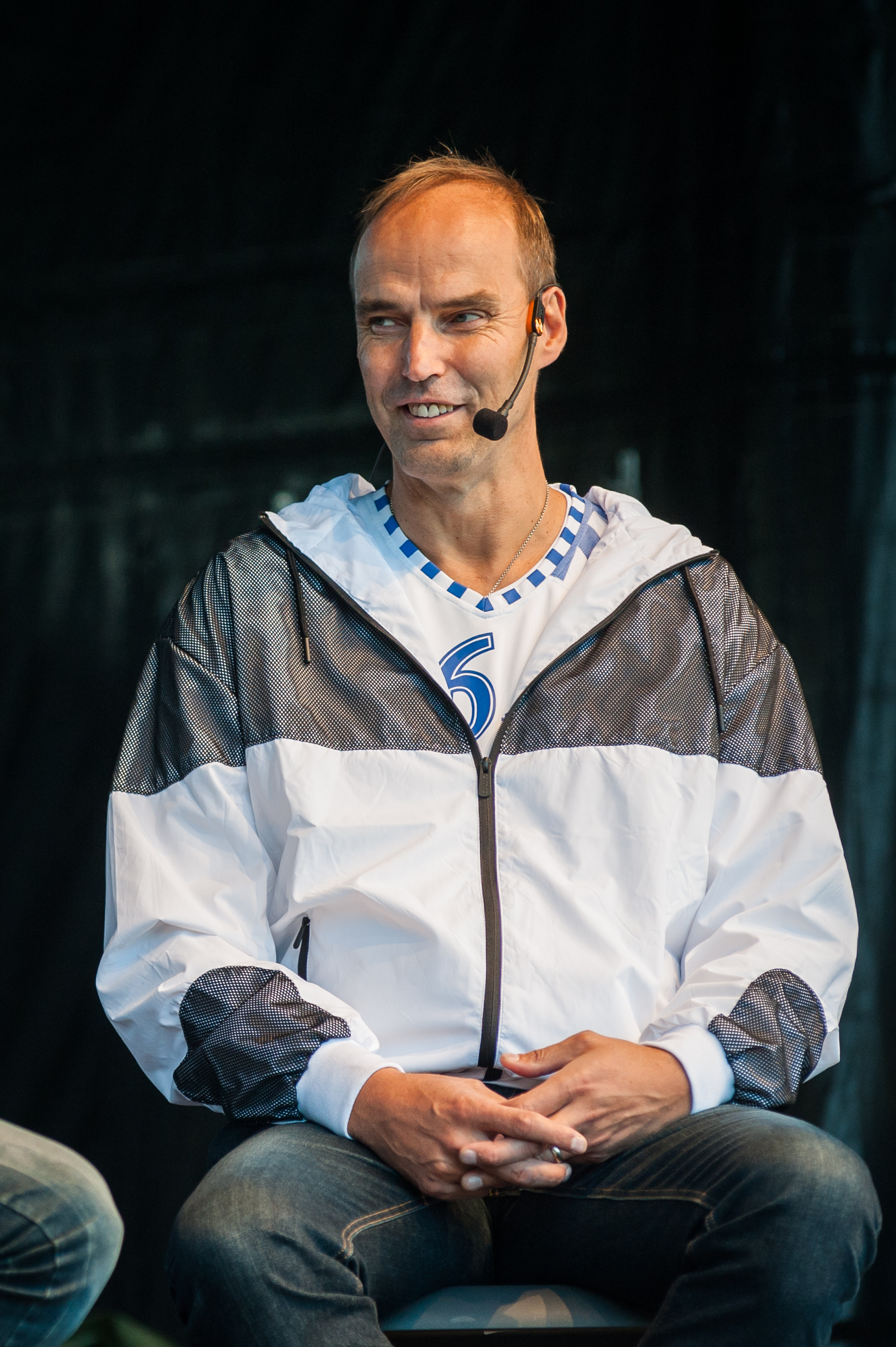
- Markkanen, in September 2017.

Personal information
- Born: 28 May 1967 (age 59) Pori, Finland
- Listed height: 6 ft 11 in (2.11 m)
- Listed weight: 242 lb (110 kg)

Career information
- College: Kansas (1989–1990)
- Playing career: 1985–2007
- Position: Center

Career history
- 1985–1988: Helsingin NMKY
- 1988–1989; 1990–1993: Hongikon Nuorisoseuran Urheilijat
- 1993–1994: Sant Josep
- 1994–1995: ZTE
- 1995–1996: Bamberg TSK
- 1996–1998: Torpan Pojat
- 1998–2000: SLUC Nancy
- 2000: HoNsU
- 2000–2001: Säynätsalon Riento
- 2001–2002: BC Jyväskylä
- 2007: Kataja

Career highlights
- 3× Finnish Basketball Player of the Year (1989, 1993, 1996); 3× Finnish League champion (1987, 1997, 1998); Finnish League Finnish Player of the Year (1989)

Pekka Juha Markkanen (born 28 May 1967) is a Finnish former professional basketball player. He was named the Finnish Basketball Player of the Year, by Finnish sports journalists, in 1989, 1993, and 1996.

== College career ==
Markkanen played college basketball at the University of Kansas, with the Kansas Jayhawks (1989–1990).

== Professional career ==
During his pro club career, Markkanen won three Finnish League championships, in 1987, 1997, and 1998. He was named the Finnish League's Finnish Player of the Year, in 1989.

== National team career ==
Markkanen had 129 caps (games played) with the senior Finnish national basketball team, in which he scored a total of 1,432 points.

== Personal life ==
Markkanen is the father of Utah Jazz basketball player Lauri Markkanen and professional football player Eero Markkanen, formerly on Real Madrid Castilla. His third son Miikka, also played basketball, before retiring early due to injuries. The boys' mother and Markkanen's ex-wife Riikka (née Ellonen), was also a basketball player.
