= Petteri Koponen =

Finnish basketball player

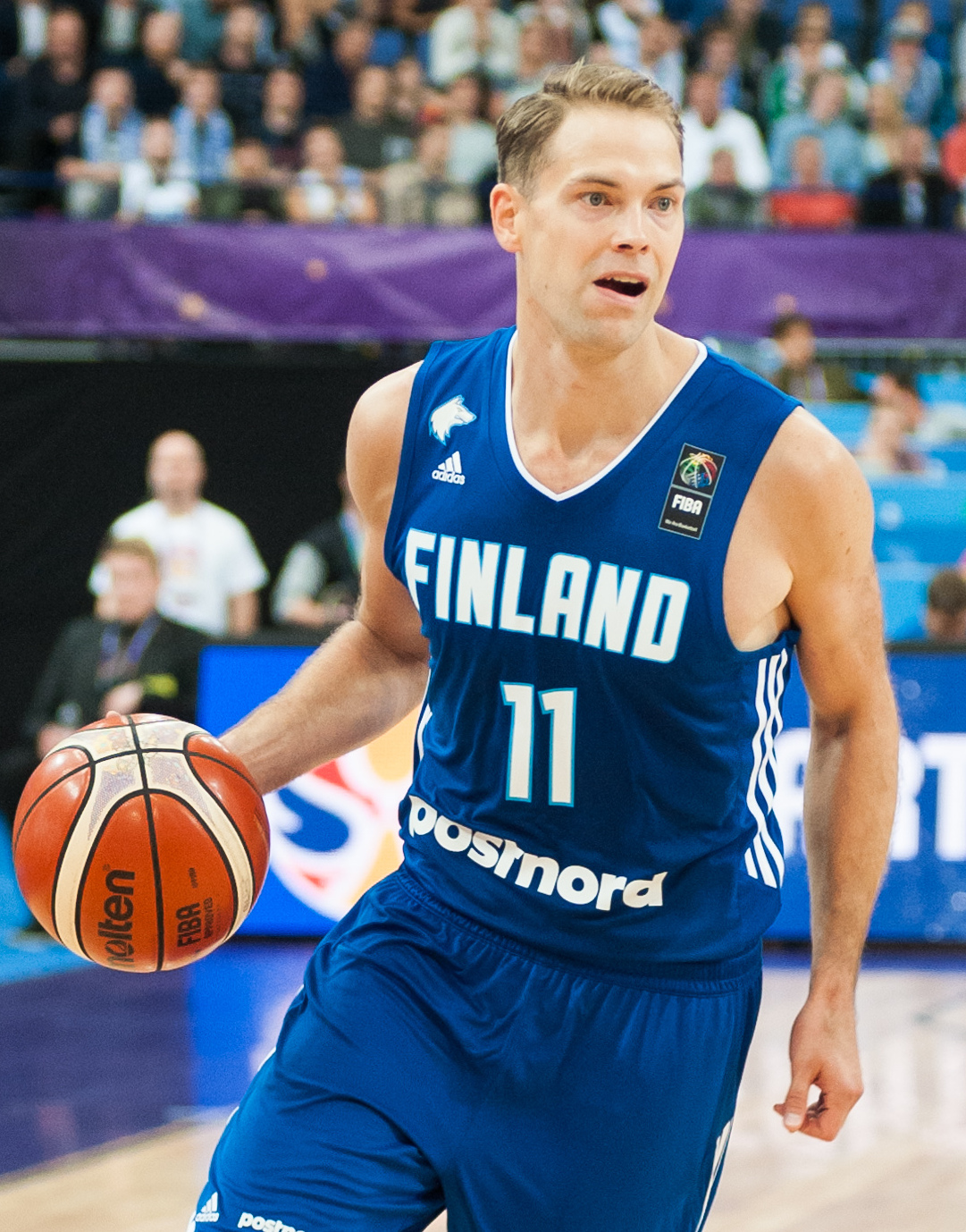
- Koponen with Finland at the EuroBasket 2017

Personal information
- Born: 13 April 1988 (age 38) Helsinki, Finland
- Listed height: 1.94 m (6 ft 4 in)
- Listed weight: 88 kg (194 lb)

Career information
- NBA draft: 2007: 1st round, 30th overall pick
- Drafted by: Philadelphia 76ers
- Playing career: 2004–2022
- Position: Point guard / shooting guard
- Coaching career: 2024–present

Career history

Playing
- 2004–2008: Tapiolan Honka
- 2008–2012: Virtus Bologna
- 2012–2016: Khimki
- 2016–2018: Barcelona
- 2018–2020: Bayern Munich
- 2021: Pallacanestro Reggiana
- 2021–2022: Helsinki Seagulls

Coaching
- 2024–2026: New Zealand Breakers

Career highlights
- As player: EuroCup champion (2015); All-EuroCup First Team (2015); 2× EuroLeague 50–40–90 club (2018, 2019); FIBA EuroChallenge champion (2009); Spanish Cup winner (2018); Bundesliga winner (2019); VTB United League Sixth Man of the Year (2015); All-VTB United League Second Team (2015); 7× Finnish Player of the Year (2008, 2011–2016); 2× Finnish Korisliiga champion (2007, 2008); Finnish Cup winner (2022); EuroBasket steals leader (2013); FIBA World Cup assists leader (2014); Korisliiga MVP (2008); As coach: NBL Ignite Cup winner (2026)
- Stats at Basketball Reference

Petteri Johannes Koponen (born 13 April 1988) is a Finnish professional basketball coach and former player who most recently served as the head coach of the New Zealand Breakers in the Australian National Basketball League (NBL). Standing at 1.94 m (6 ft 4 1/2 in), he played both point guard and shooting guard positions. He was drafted as the 30th pick by the Philadelphia 76ers in the 2007 NBA draft.

== Professional career ==
=== Tapiolan Honka (2004–2008) ===
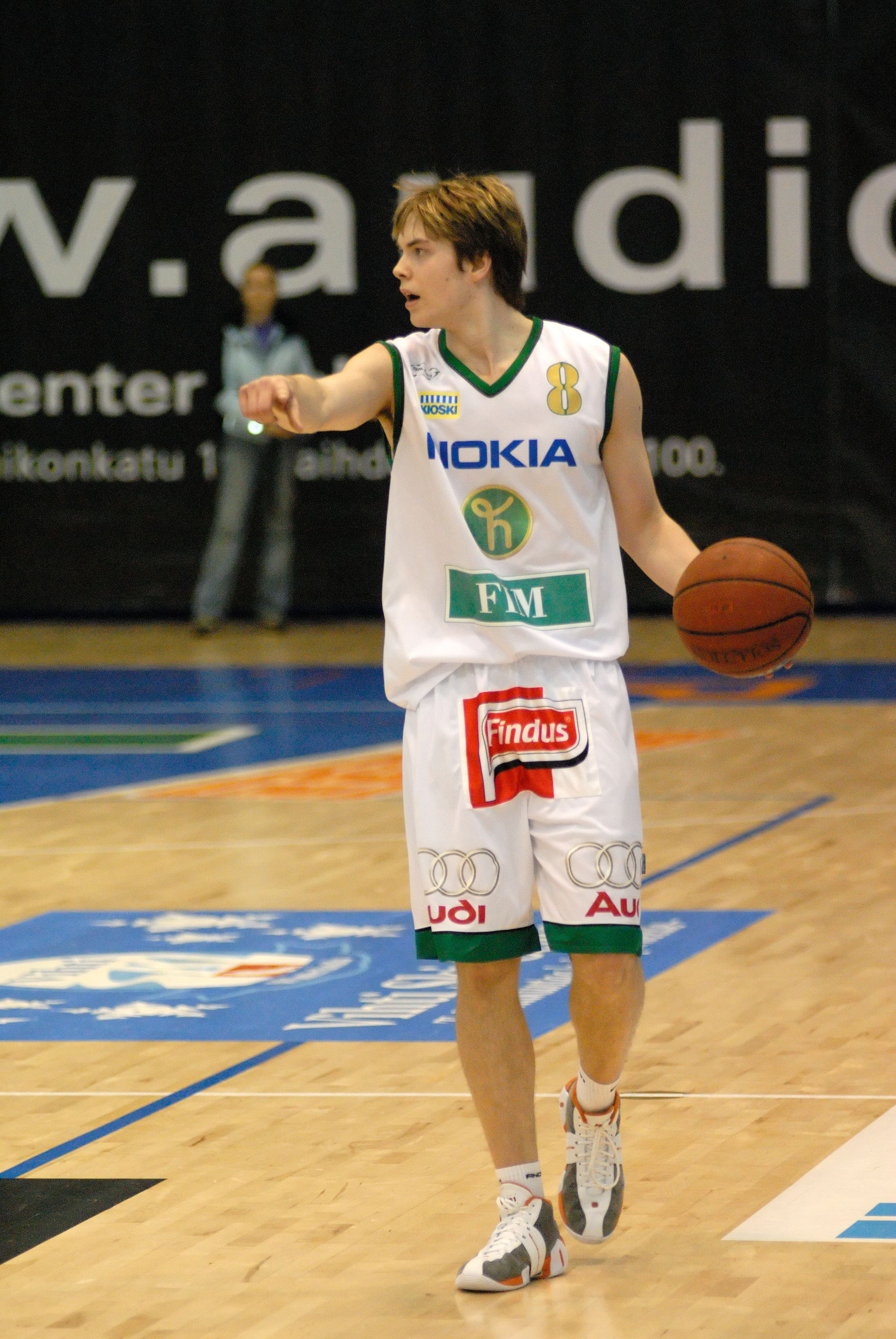
Koponen with Honka in 2007

His first club was Malmi Super-Koris ("Malmi super-basketball"), from where he joined one of Finland's top clubs, Espoo Honka in 2004–05 season. Under the guidance of coach Mihailo Pavićević, he quickly developed into a key component of Honka's Finnish League championship-winning side in 2006–07. During the 2006–07 campaign Koponen averaged 12.4 points, 2.4 rebounds and 3.7 assists per game.

Koponen played in the World All-Star team at the Nike Hoop Summit in 2007. He recorded 7 points and 6 assists with only one turnover, playing against future NBA super star, MVP Derrick Rose.

Koponen began his mandatory military service in the Lahti Military Academy in October 2007, participating in a special military service built for professional athletes such as Finnish tennis player Jarkko Nieminen. The 2007–08 Finnish League season began slowly, with Koponen trying to adapt to the military recruit training. Koponen struggled a lot in the opening month of the season, but found his rhythm in November, recording 21.4 points, 4.1 assists, 3.9 rebounds and 2.1 steals a game while draining 55.6% of his 2-point attempts, 45.8% of his 3-point attempts and 81.0% of his free throws. In the first game of December, Koponen played through a concussion and led the Honka Playboys to an overtime victory over Team Componenta, scoring 32 points, grabbing six rebounds and dishing out five assists. After the game, the concussion forced Koponen to be sidelined for a week.

On 14 July 2008, in the NBA Summer League game against the Washington Wizards, Koponen scored 19 points, shooting 4-for-6 on three-point attempts.

=== Virtus Bologna (2008–2012) ===
In August 2008, Koponen signed a four-year deal with the Italian team Virtus Bologna. At the end of his first season with Bologna, the team won the FIBA EuroChallenge championship in 2009.

=== Khimki (2012–2016) ===
On 31 May 2012, Koponen signed a three-year contract with the Russian team Khimki in the EuroLeague. On 27 March 2015, he re-signed with Khimki for two more years. With Khimki he won the 2014–15 EuroCup season, and was also named to the All-EuroCup First Team.

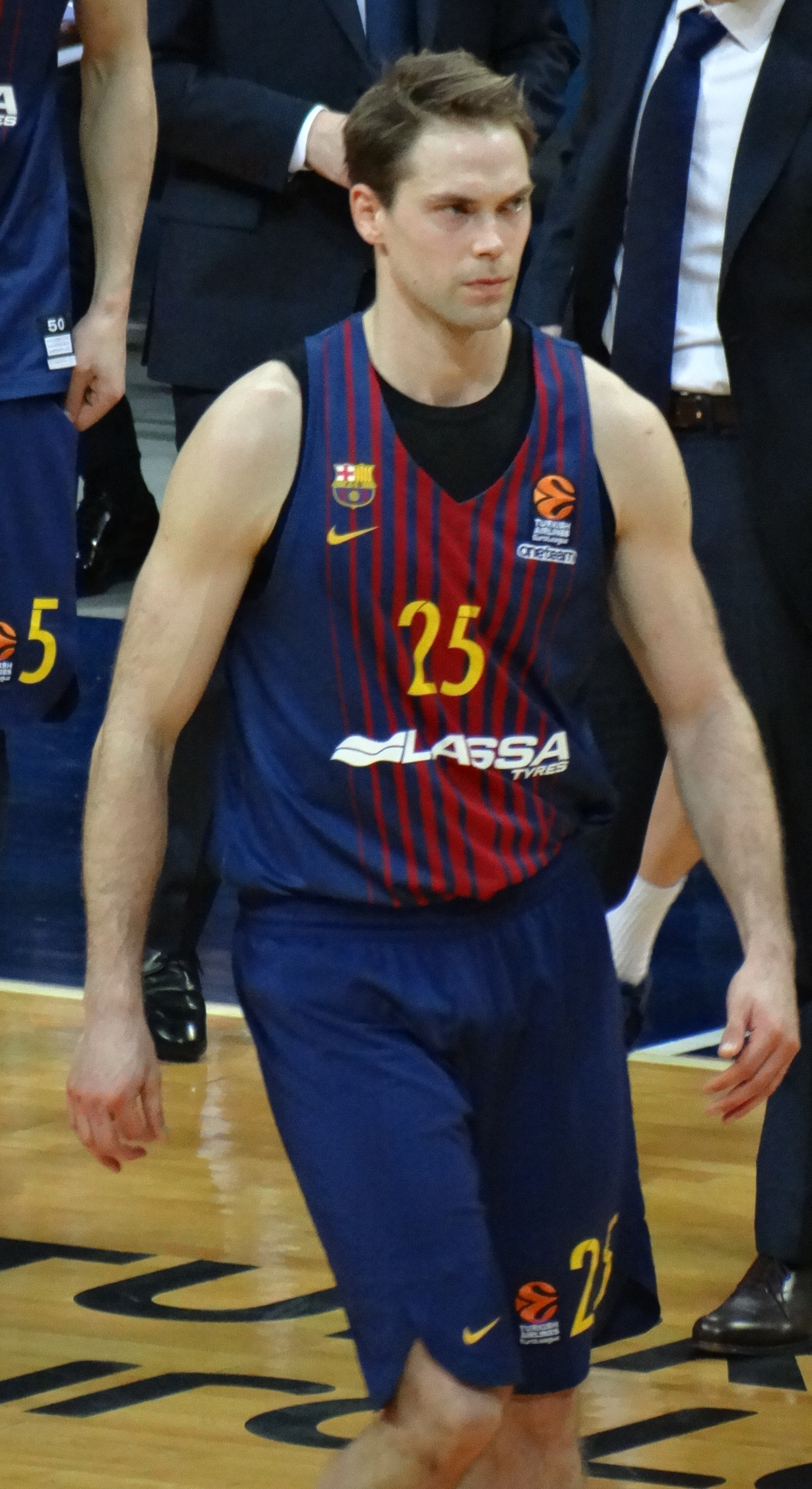
Koponen with Barcelona in 2018

=== Barcelona (2016–2018) ===
On 16 August 2016, Koponen signed a three-year contract with Spanish powerhouse Barcelona. One month later, he would suffer a traffic accident that caused him a head injury. He parted ways with Barcelona on 29 June 2018.

=== Bayern Munich (2018–2020) ===
On 24 July 2018, Koponen signed a three-year contract with Bayern Munich of the German Basketball Bundesliga (BBL).

=== Pallacanestro Reggiana (2021) ===
On 12 January 2021, Koponen signed with Pallacanestro Reggiana of the Italian Lega Basket Serie A (LBA).

=== Helsinki Seagulls (2021–2022) ===
On 13 August 2021, Koponen returned to Finland in the Korisliiga, signing for Helsinki Seagulls. He retired from his professional club career after the 2021–22 season due to consecutive hip problems.

=== NBA draft rights ===
On 28 June 2007, Koponen was taken 30th overall in the 2007 NBA draft by the Philadelphia 76ers. He was the final first-round pick in the draft. Philadelphia then traded Koponen to the Portland Trail Blazers in exchange for Derrick Byars and cash considerations. On 23 June 2011, Koponen's rights were traded to the Dallas Mavericks for the Mavericks' second-round pick in the 2011 draft (57). On 27 June 2024, Koponen's rights were traded to the New York Knicks.

== National team career ==
Koponen played for the Finnish national youth teams in 2004, 2005 and 2006.

He debuted for the Finnish senior men's team in 2007. He played for Finland at the 2014 FIBA Basketball World Cup. He also represented his country at the EuroBasket 2011, EuroBasket 2013, EuroBasket 2015, EuroBasket 2017, and retired along with Shawn Huff after the EuroBasket 2022 tournament, where Finland historically advanced to the quarter-finals.

== Coaching career ==
Between 2022 and 2024, Koponen worked as a junior coach in the EuroLeague Next Generation invitational tournament and was with the coaching staff of Helsinki Basketball Academy team HBA-Märsky in Finland.

Koponen joined the coaching staff of the San Antonio Spurs for the 2024 NBA Summer League.

On 4 July 2024, Koponen was named the head coach of the New Zealand Breakers in the Australian National Basketball League (NBL) on a two-year deal. Koponen led Breakers to a flying start in the league, and at the start of November after the 113–79 away win over Melbourne United, they were sitting in the top spot with a 6–2 record. The away win against Melbourne marked also the team's first away victory at the John Cain Arena since 2018. The Breakers went on to finish in second-to-last place with a 10–19 record.

On 7 April 2025, Koponen was confirmed by the new ownership group as the Breakers' head coach for the 2025–26 NBL season. The Breakers finished outside the finals spots in seventh at the end of the regular season but won the inaugural NBL Ignite Cup Final. On 28 February 2026, he parted ways with the Breakers.

== Career statistics ==
Legend
GP	Games played	GS	Games started	MPG	Minutes per game
FG%	Field-goal percentage	3P%	3-point field-goal percentage	FT%	Free-throw percentage
RPG	Rebounds per game	APG	Assists per game	SPG	Steals per game
BPG	Blocks per game	PPG	Points per game	PIR	Performance index rating
**Bold**	Career high

=== EuroLeague ===
Year	Team	GP	GS	MPG	FG%	3P%	FT%	RPG	APG	SPG	BPG	PPG	PIR
2012–13	Khimki	21	5	16.2	.465	.429	**.957**	1.0	2.1	.1	**.1**	6.5	6.6
2015–16	Khimki	24	7	19.5	.426	.381	.879	1.6	**2.3**	.5	.0	8.5	7.8
2016–17	Barcelona	27	3	**22.6**	.429	.462	.915	**1.7**	1.9	**.7**	.0	**10.1**	**8.9**
2017–18	Barcelona	29	9	20.2	.491	**.511**	.938	1.6	1.5	.5	.0	7.9	7.3
2018–19	Bayern München	**30**	3	18.3	**.516**	.468	.923	1.6	1.9	.3	.0	9.0	8.8
2019–20	Bayern München	24	**10**	17.1	.450	.500	.765	1.2	1.5	.2	.0	6.8	4.9
Career		155	37	19.1	.463	.462	.901	1.5	1.8	.4	.0	8.3	7.5

=== EuroCup ===
†	Denotes season in which Koponen won the EuroCup

Year	Team	GP	GS	MPG	FG%	3P%	FT%	RPG	APG	SPG	BPG	PPG	PIR
2013–14	Khimki	18	3	**27.2**	.500	**.471**	**.889**	2.8	2.8	**1.1**	.0	11.3	12.8
2014–15†	Khimki	**24**	**10**	27.1	**.532**	.454	.700	**2.9**	**3.3**	.9	.0	**13.5**	**15.0**
Career		42	13	27.2	.520	.462	.776	2.9	3.1	1.0	.0	12.6	14.0

=== National team ===
*	Led the tournament

Team	Tournament	Pos.	GP	PPG	RPG	APG
Finland	EuroBasket 2011	9th	8	13.3	1.9	3.1
Finland	EuroBasket 2013	9th	8	13.3	3.4	4.8
Finland	2014 FIBA World Cup	22nd	5	15.8	3.0	5.8*
Finland	EuroBasket 2015	16th	6	11.5	2.0	6.0
Finland	EuroBasket 2017	11th	6	13.2	2.5	6.3
Finland	EuroBasket 2022	7th	7	5.4	0.0	2.6

== Coaching record ==
Team	Year	G	W	L	W–L%	Result
New Zealand Breakers	2024–25	29	10	19	.345	9th
New Zealand Breakers	2025–26	34	14	20	.412	7th
Career		63	24	39	.381	

== Personal life ==
Koponen and his wife have three sons.
