= Jorma Pilkevaara =

Finnish basketball player (1945–2006)

Personal information
- Born: 24 October 1945 Helsinki, Finland
- Died: 12 July 2006 (aged 60) Hamina, Finland
- Listed height: 6 ft 2 in (1.88 m)
- Listed weight: 190 lb (86 kg)

Career highlights
- FIBA European Selection (1967); 7× Finnish League champion; 4× Finnish Player of the Year (1966, 1967, 1968, 1973); Finnish Basketball Hall of Fame (2013)

Jorma Kalevi "Pilkku" Pilkevaara (24 October 1945, Helsinki – 12 July 2006, Hamina) was a Finnish professional basketball player. During his playing career, he was listed at 1.88 m (6 ft 2 in) tall, and 86 kg (190 lb). He was elected to the Finnish Basketball Hall of Fame, in 2013.

== Professional career ==
Pilkevaara was a member of the FIBA European Selection, in 1967. He won four Finnish League championships, with Torpan Pojat, in 1965–66, Espoon Honka, in 1967–68 and 1968–69, and with Turun NMKY, in 1981–82.

== National team career ==
Pilkevaara was a member of the senior Finnish national basketball team. He played at the 1964 Summer Olympics, and the EuroBasket 1967.
