= Veikko Vainio =

Finnish basketball player (born 1948)

Personal information
- Born: 1 April 1948 (age 78) Kotka, Finland
- Listed height: 6 ft 9 in (2.06 m)
- Listed weight: 220 lb (100 kg)

Career information
- College: BYU (1968–1971)
- NBA draft: 1971: undrafted
- Playing career: 1964–1974
- Position: Center

Career history
- 1964–1967: KTP
- 1971–1974: Pantterit

Career highlights
- FIBA European Selection (1968); Finnish League champion (1967); Finnish Basketball Hall of Fame (2017)

Veikko Vainio (born April 1, 1948) is a retired Finnish professional basketball player. At 6 ft 9 in (2.06 m) tall, he played at the center position. He earned All-Tournament Team honors at EuroBasket 1967.

== College career ==
Vainio played college basketball at Brigham Young University (BYU), with the Cougars.

== Playing career ==
=== Club career ===
In his club career, Vainio won one Finnish League championship, in 1967, while playing with KTP.

=== Finnish national team ===
Vainio was a regular member of the senior Finnish national team, with whom he played in 68 games. He helped lead Finland to a sixth-place finish at the EuroBasket 1967, averaging 7.1 points per game. He was selected to the All-Tournament Team.
