= Lea Hakala =

Finnish basketball player and coach (born 1960)

Personal information
- Born: 15 March 1960 (age 65) Helsinki, Finland
- Listed height: 1.83 m (6 ft 0 in)

Career information
- College: Maryland (1982–1983)
- Playing career: 1975–2009
- Position: Small forward/power forward

Career history
- 1975–1982: Lahden Sampo
- 1983–1984: Pescara
- 1984–1988: Lahden Sampo
- 1988–1989: El Almendro
- 1989–1990: Real Canoe
- 1990–1991: Ensino
- 1991–1992: UB-Barça
- 1992–1999: Forssan Alku
- 1999–2000: Pussihukat
- 2000–2005: Pantterit
- 2008–2009: Pantterit

Lea Helena Hakala (born 15 March 1960) is a Finnish basketball coach and former player. Standing at 1.83 m (6 ft 0 in) tall, she played as a power forward and a small forward. Hakala played basketball for nine different teams in Finland, Italy and Spain.

== Professional career ==
Hakala is considered to be the best Finnish women's basketball player ever. She won 16 women's Finnish championships. In the Finnish national team she played a total of 26 years and 251 matches with 4138 points. She was part of the Finnish team that played in EuroBasket Women in 1980 (Score average 16.7 points/match), 1981 (18.9) and 1987 (21.2).

== Post-playing career ==
Hakala is a member of the Women's Committee of the International Basketball Federation FIBA and the Finnish Top Sports Development Group. In addition, she is the team leader of the Finnish women's national team. She works as an assistant principal and coach at Pohjois-Haagan yhteiskoulu. In 1995, Hakala was among the first four team athletes to receive the stamp. Hakala also has a daughter who has played basketball. Hakala's mother Eila Koiso-Kanttila also played basketball and was part of the 1952 Finnish team.

In 2013, Hakala was inducted to the Finnish Basketball Hall of Fame. She was invited to the FIBA Europe Legends match played at the 2015 Women's European Championships. In January 2019, Hakala was named the second person with a basketball background in history inducted to the Finnish Sports Hall of Fame.
