= Hanno Möttölä =

Finnish basketball player

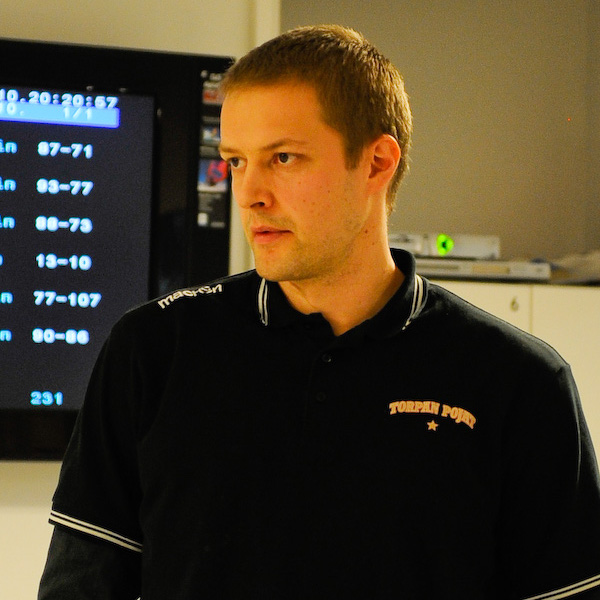
- Möttölä in 2009

Brisbane Bullets
- Title: Assistant coach
- League: NBL

Personal information
- Born: 9 September 1976 (age 50) Helsinki, Finland
- Listed height: 6 ft 10 in (2.08 m)
- Listed weight: 250 lb (113 kg)

Career information
- College: Utah (1996–2000)
- NBA draft: 2000: 2nd round, 40th overall pick
- Drafted by: Atlanta Hawks
- Playing career: 1994–2014
- Position: Power forward
- Number: 13

Career history

Playing
- 1994-1996: Helsingin NMKY
- 2000–2002: Atlanta Hawks
- 2002–2003: TAU Cerámica
- 2003–2004: Fortitudo Bologna
- 2004–2005: Scavolini Pesaro
- 2005–2006: Dynamo Moscow
- 2006–2007: Žalgiris Kaunas
- 2007–2008: Aris Thessaloniki
- 2009–2012: Torpan Pojat
- 2013: Torpan Pojat

Coaching
- 2014–2024: HBA-Märsky
- 2026–present: Brisbane Bullets (assistant)

Career highlights
- EuroCup champion (2006); Lithuanian League LKL champion (2007); Lithuanian Cup winner (2007); 8× Finnish Player of the Year (1997–2002, 2004, 2005); Finnish League Best Young Player (1995); First-team All-WAC (1999)
- Stats at NBA.com
- Stats at Basketball Reference

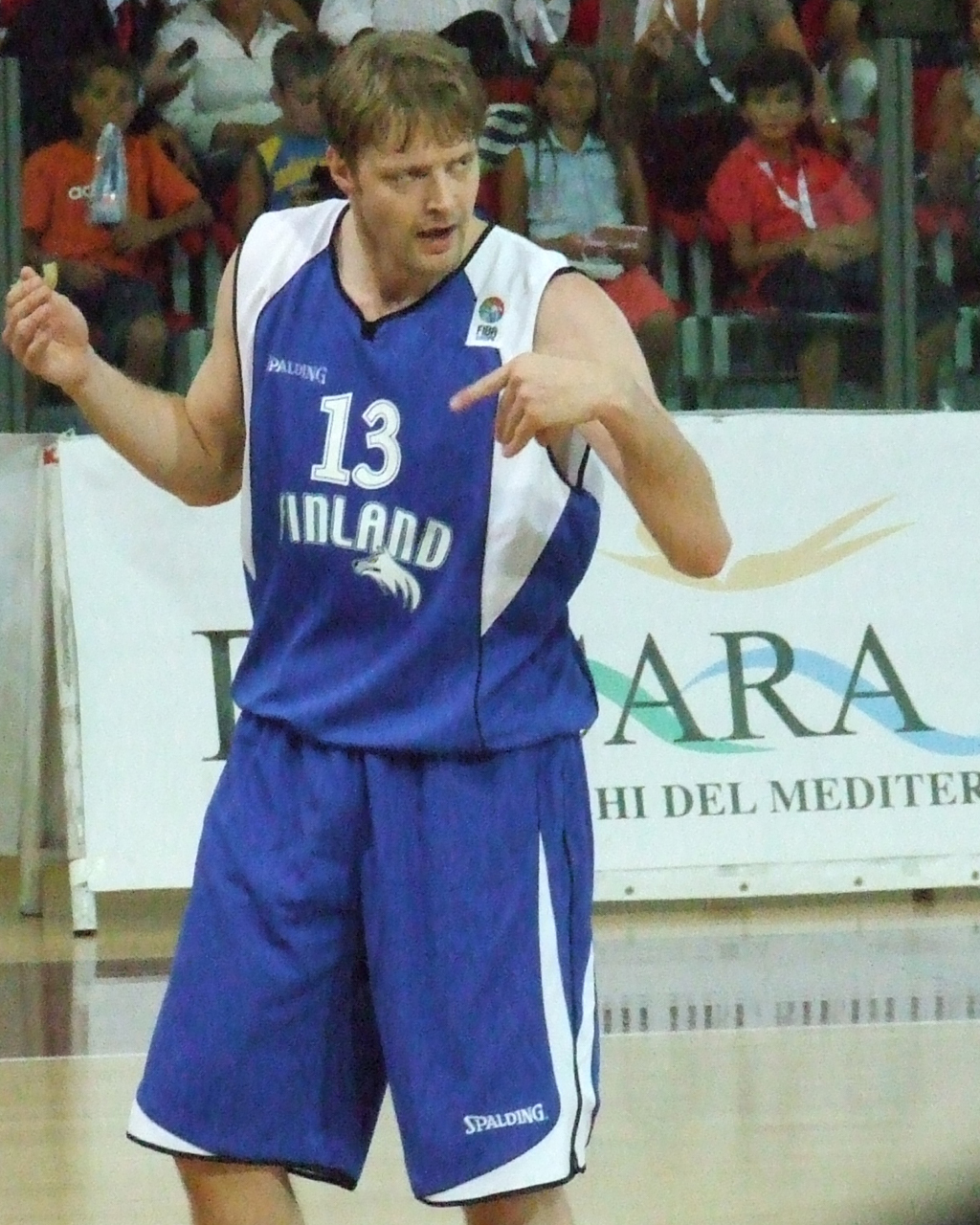
Möttölä playing for Finland in 2008

Hanno Aleksanteri Möttölä (born 9 September 1976) is a Finnish professional basketball coach and former player who is currently an assistant coach for the Brisbane Bullets of the Australian National Basketball League (NBL). He played college basketball for the Utah Utes before playing two seasons in the National Basketball Association (NBA) for the Atlanta Hawks between 2000 and 2002, becoming the first player from Finland to play in the NBA.

== College career ==
Möttölä attended the University of Utah, in the United States, where he played college basketball under head coach Rick Majerus. He was a starter on the Utah Utes team that played in the final of the 1998 NCAA national championship tournament, which they lost to Kentucky.

Möttölä was named in the Utah Athletics Hall of Fame in September 2023.

== Professional career ==
After college, Möttölä was selected in the second round, with the 40th overall pick, in the 2000 NBA draft, by the Atlanta Hawks. He played two seasons in the NBA with the Hawks. He played in all 82 games during his sophomore (and final) season. His final NBA game was on April 17, 2002, in an 81–89 loss to the Boston Celtics where he recorded 1 steal and 2 rebounds.

After his time with the Hawks, he returned to Europe to play in the EuroLeague. He played in Spain with TAU Cerámica of the Liga ACB, where he suffered an ankle injury. Then he played in Italy with Skipper Bologna (in the 2003–04 season, his team reached the Italian League finals and EuroLeague Final). He also played in Italy with Scavolini Pesaro (from 2004 to 2005).

Möttölä also played in the Russian Super League with Dynamo Moscow, in the Lithuanian LKL League with Žalgiris Kaunas, and in the Greek Basket League (GBL) with Aris, after signing with the team on 26 July 2007.

Möttölä announced his retirement from playing basketball on 26 September 2008, but decided to return to basketball just nine months later. In September 2009, Möttölä signed with the Finnish team Torpan Pojat. He played in the team for four seasons, during which the team was the runner-up in the Finnish League championship (2009–10), in the Finnish Cup (2010–11), and finished in third-place in Finnish League (2011–12).

== International career ==
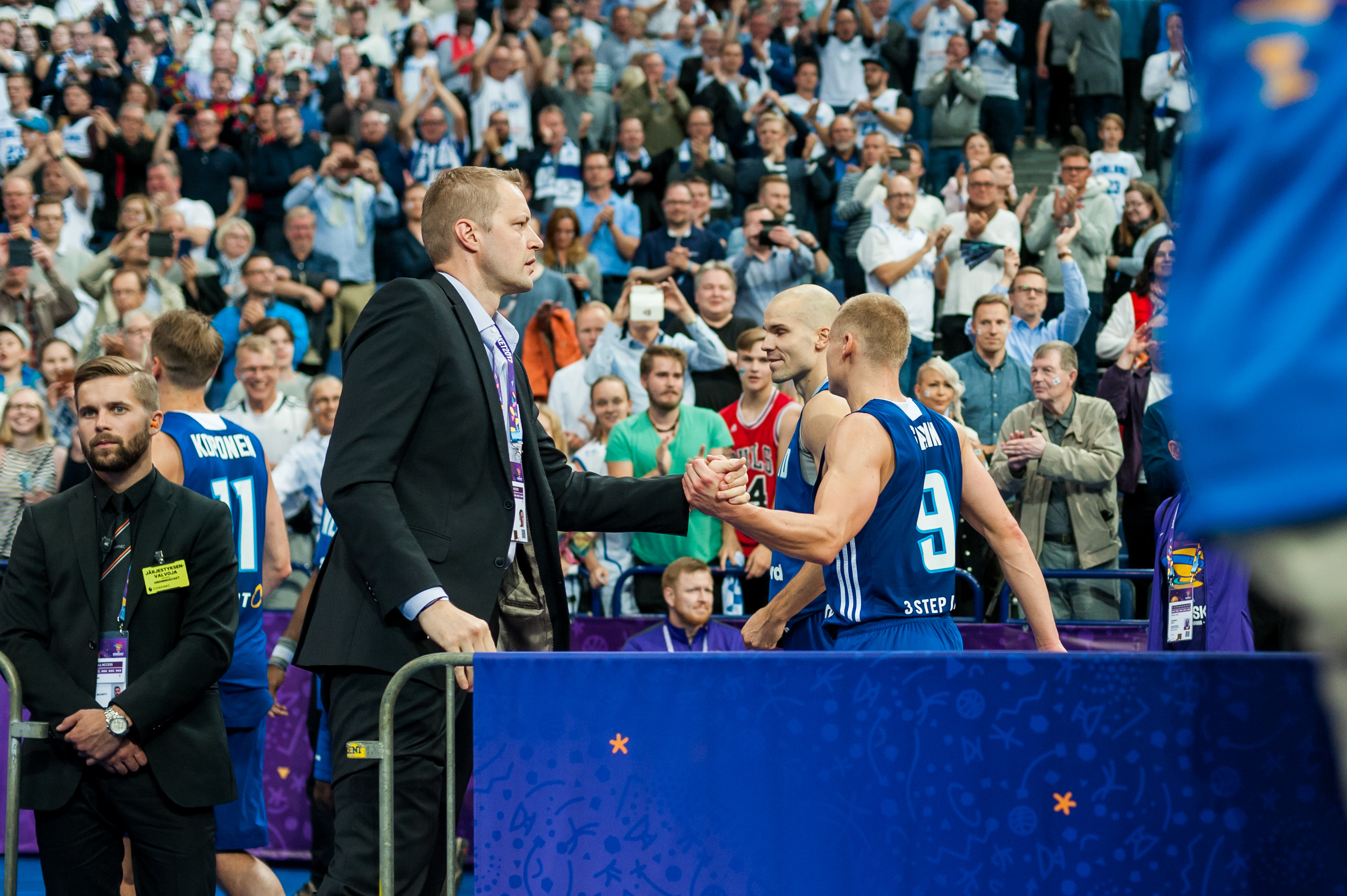
Möttölä at the EuroBasket 2017

Möttölä was a long-time member of the senior Finnish national basketball team. With Finland, he played at the 1995 EuroBasket, the 2011 EuroBasket, the 2013 EuroBasket, and the 2014 FIBA World Cup.

== Coaching career ==
After ending his playing career, Möttölä has worked as the head coach of Helsinki Basketball Academy team HBA-Märsky in second-tier Koripallon I-divisioona, and an assistant coach of Finland national team since 2019.

In May 2024, Möttölä was invited to coach at NBA G League Elite Camp and at the 2024 NBA draft combine event.

In August 2025, it was announced that Möttölä would join the coaching staff of the Canada men's national basketball team after the EuroBasket 2025 tournament with Finland.

In May 2026, Möttölä was appointed an assistant coach for the Brisbane Bullets of the Australian National Basketball League (NBL).

== Personal life ==
Finnish ice hockey players, Jarkko Ruutu and Tuomo Ruutu, are Möttölä's second cousins.

== Career statistics ==
Legend
GP	Games played	GS	Games started	MPG	Minutes per game
FG%	Field-goal percentage	3P%	3-point field-goal percentage	FT%	Free-throw percentage
RPG	Rebounds per game	APG	Assists per game	SPG	Steals per game
BPG	Blocks per game	PPG	Points per game	PIR	Performance index rating
**Bold**	Career high

=== NBA ===
Year	Team	GP	GS	MPG	FG%	3P%	FT%	RPG	APG	SPG	BPG	PPG
2000-01	Atlanta	72	3	13.5	**.444**	.000	**.811**	2.4	.3	**.2**	.1	4.5
2001-02	Atlanta	**82**	**14**	**16.7**	.440	**.077**	.750	**3.3**	**.6**	**.2**	**.2**	**4.8**
Career		154	17	15.2	.442	.063	.783	2.9	.5	.2	.2	4.6

=== EuroLeague ===
Year	Team	GP	GS	MPG	FG%	3P%	FT%	RPG	APG	SPG	BPG	PPG	PIR
2002–03	TAU Cerámica	7	3	**30.4**	**.569**	.444	.774	3.4	1.0	.7	.3	**15.1**	**13.6**
2003–04	Skipper Bologna	**22**	**16**	21.8	.520	.348	**.879**	3.8	.4	.8	.4	10.8	9.2
2004–05	Scavolini Pesaro	**22**	**16**	28.6	.497	.375	.833	**5.1**	.9	**1.0**	**.5**	13.7	12.2
2006–07	Žalgiris	12	5	22.6	.547	**.500**	.806	3.9	**1.3**	.5	**.5**	10.9	9.8
2007–08	Aris	20	**16**	19.7	.488	.459	.824	2.8	.7	.4	.1	8.0	6.0
Career		83	56	23.9	.516	.406	.833	3.9	.8	.7	.3	11.3	9.7

=== EuroCup ===
†	Denotes season in which Möttölä won the EuroCup

Year	Team	GP	GS	MPG	FG%	3P%	FT%	RPG	APG	SPG	BPG	PPG	PIR
2005–06†	Dynamo Moscow	14	4	16.54	.397	.444	.167	3.0	.5	.7	.6	6.4	4.2

=== College ===
Year	Team	GP	GS	MPG	FG%	3P%	FT%	RPG	APG	SPG	BPG	PPG
1996–97	Utah	32	1	17.5	**.586**	.000	.623	2.8	.9	.3	.3	6.4
1997–98	Utah	**34**	**34**	28.2	.489	.291	.754	5.3	.8	**.4**	.5	12.5
1998–99	Utah	33	33	**31.0**	.482	**.354**	**.833**	**5.4**	1.4	**.4**	.4	15.3
1999–00	Utah	21	19	27.6	.498	.350	.827	4.8	**1.7**	.2	**.6**	**17.0**
Career		120	87	26.0	.500	.333	.774	4.6	1.2	.3	.4	12.4

=== National team ===
Team	Tournament	Pos.	GP	PPG	RPG	APG
Finland	EuroBasket 1995	13th	6	4.2	4.2	0.5
Finland	EuroBasket 2011	9th	5	6.0	1.2	0.0
Finland	EuroBasket 2013	9th	5	6.2	1.8	0.4
Finland	2014 FIBA World Cup	22nd	4	2.8	0.5	0.0
