= Timo Suviranta =

Finnish basketball player (1930–1994)

Personal information
- Nationality: Finnish
- Born: 9 June 1930; Helsinki, Finland
- Died: 21 January 1994 (aged 63); Helsinki, Finland

Sport
- Sport: Basketball

Timo Suviranta (9 June 1930 – 21 January 1994) was a Finnish basketball player. He competed in the men's tournament at the 1952 Summer Olympics.
