= Timo Lampén =

Finnish basketball player (1934–1999)

Personal information
- Nationality: Finnish
- Born: 5 September 1934; Lahti, Finland
- Died: 27 May 1999 (aged 64); Lahti, Finland

Sport
- Sport: Basketball

Timo Lampén (5 September 1934 – 27 May 1999) was a Finnish basketball player. He competed in the men's tournament at the 1964 Summer Olympics.
