= Mykhaylychenko =

Mykhaylychenko is a Ukrainian surname (Михайличенко) formed out of personal name Michael (Mykhailo). Its Russian-language transliteration is Mikhailichenko or Mikhaylichenko.

The surname may refer to:

- Larisa Mikhalchenko (born 1963), retired Ukrainian discus thrower
- Oleksiy Mykhaylychenko (born 1963), Ukrainian football coach and former player
- Ivan Mikhailichenko (1920–1982), Soviet Ukrainian World War II pilot, twice Hero of the Soviet Union
- Khrystyna Mykhailichenko (born 2006), Ukrainian pianist
- Yevgeniy Mikhailichenko, Russian athlete

== See also ==
- Mykhaylenko
- Mikhaylov (disambiguation)
- Mikhaylovsk
- Mikhaylovsky (disambiguation)
- Mikhaylovka (disambiguation)
