= Mikhaylovsky District =

Federal subjects of Russia which currently have an entity called Mikhaylovsky District

Mikhaylovsky District is the name of several administrative and municipal districts in Russia. The name is generally derived from or is related to the male first name Mikhail.

== Districts of the federal subjects ==
- Mikhaylovsky District, Altai Krai, an administrative and municipal district of Altai Krai
- Mikhaylovsky District, Amur Oblast, an administrative and municipal district of Amur Oblast
- Mikhaylovsky District, Primorsky Krai, an administrative and municipal district of Primorsky Krai
- Mikhaylovsky District, Ryazan Oblast, an administrative and municipal district of Ryazan Oblast
- Mikhaylovsky District, Volgograd Oblast, an administrative district of Volgograd Oblast

== Renamed districts ==
- Mikhaylovsky District, name of Lesnoy District of Moscow Oblast (currently in Tver Oblast) between 1929 and 1930.

== See also ==
- Mikhaylovsky (disambiguation)
- Mikhaylovsk
- Mikhaylov (disambiguation)
