= Mikhail Minenkov =

Russian politician (25 July 1977)

Mikhaul Anatolyevich Minenkov

Advisor governor of Belgorod Oblast
- Incumbent
- Assumed office 30 August 2026
- President: Vladimir Putin
- Governor: Alexander Shuvaev

Mayor city Nevinnomyssk
- In office 16 November 2016 – 29 May 2026
- Governor: Vladimir Vladimirov
- Preceded by: Nadezhda Bogdanova
- Succeeded by: Victoria Sokolyuk (acting)

Mayor of city Mikhailovsk
- In office 20 june 2014 – 20 October 2016
- Preceded by: Alexander Lunin; Natalia Polyakova (Acting); Andrey Solovyov (Acting)
- Succeeded by: Igor Serov

Member of the Stavropol city Duma
- In office 14 April 2004 – 7 April 2014
- Chairman of the Duma: Georgy Kolyagin
- Constituency: Stavropol

Personal details
- Born: 25 jule 1977 Aleysk, Altai Territory, RSFSR, USSR
- Party: United Russia (from 2019); Movement of the First (from 2023)
- Education: Stavropol State University; Yekaterinburg Suvorov Military School; Ryazan Guards Higher Airborne Command School; Combined Arms Academy of the Armed Forces of the Russian Federation
- Profession: lawyer

Military service
- Allegiance: Russia
- Branch/service: Russian Airborne Troops
- Years of service: 1994—2006
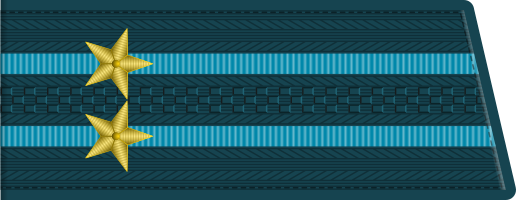
- Rank: Lieutenant Colonel
- Battles/wars: Dagestan War; Second Chechen War

Mikhaul Anatolyevich Minenkov (born 25 July 1977, Aleysk, Altai Territory, RSFSR, USSR) Russian statesman and politician. Advisor governor of Belgorod Oblast from 30 August 2026 year. Hero of the Russian Federation (2000).

Mayor city of Nevinnomyssk (from 16 November 2016 to 29 May 2026 year). Mayor of Mikhailovsk (June 20, 2014 — October 20, 2016). Member of the Stavropol city Duma (April 14, 2004 — April 7, 2014).

== Biography ==
Mikhail Anatolyevich Minenkov was born on July 25, 1977, in Altai Territory, city Aleysk.

By education, Mikhail Minenkov is a lawyer.

Father Anatoly is military, mother Lyubov worked in the field of healthcare, as an emergency medical doctor.

Grandfather on the father's side Mikhail Panteleevich, a participant in The Great Patriotic War. On my mother's side — Pavel Dmitrievich, Hero of Socialist Labor, three Orders of Lenin.

In 1994, he graduated from the Yekaterinburg Suvorov Military College.

In 1994, he began serving in the Armed Forces of the Russian Federation.

From 1994 to 1998 — cadet of the Ryazan Higher Airborne Command School named after Army General V.F.Margelov.

Since 1998, commander of the reconnaissance platoon 247th Guards Parachute Regiment.

In his youth, Minenkov practiced hand—to-hand combat - sambo.

Since August 1999, he participated in the fighting in Dagestan the gangs. as a serviceman of the Russian Army.

On October 14, 1999, Senior Lieutenant Minenkov's group was returning from another reconnaissance mission. The soldiers were ordered to help the Airborne special forces group, which was surrounded by large enemy forces. The scouts attacked the enemy from the rear, approaching with two infantry fighting vehicles. One of the cars was blown up by a land mine. With a severe leg injury, Mikhail Minenkov continued to command the group. In a matter of minutes, the soldiers broke through the encirclement. Mikhail Minenkov led the withdrawal and evacuation. The soldiers carried him out of the battlefield. The leg had to be amputated in the hospital. But he persevered and returned to his regiment. According to Minenkov, he served in the Russian army with the famous military commander Yunus-Bek Yevkurov and is familiar with the former commander of the Russian Airborne Forces, Vladimir Shamanov.

In 1999-2001 — Assistant Chief of Intelligence of the Airborne Regiment.

On January 17, 2000, by decree of the acting President of the Russian Federation Vladimir Putin Mikhail Anatolyevich Minenkov was awarded the title Hero of the Russian Federation.

In 2002, he graduated from Faculty of Law Stavropol State University.

In 2004, he graduated from the Combined Arms Academy of the Armed Forces of the Russian Federation.

Since 2004, Minenkov — Deputy Military Commissar Shpakovsky district Stavropol Territory.

From April 14, 2004, to April 7, 2014 — Deputy of the Stavropol city Duma.

From 2006 to 2014, he was the Commercial Director, executive director of Magnat-2002 LLC and Premiere LLC in the Stavropol Territory of Russia.

From March 28, 2011, to April 7, 2014, he was Chairman of the Stavropol City Duma Committee on Construction Urban Economy and Ecology, and also served as Deputy Chairman of the Standing Committee on Legality and Local Government of the Stavropol City Duma.

From April 8 to June 20, 2014 — First Deputy Mayor of Mikhailovsk, was also the interim mayor of the city.

From June 20, 2014, to October 20, 2016, he was the mayor of Mikhailovsk.

From October 26 to November 16, 2016 – first deputy head of the Nevinnomyssk city administration.

From November 16, 2016 to 29 May 2026 year – mayor of city Nevinnomyssk.

Since November 28, 2019, he has been a member of the United Russia Party.

On December 28, 2019 year, Minenkov received a party ticket and a badge.

From February 26, 2020 to 29 May 2026 year — Secretary of the Nevinnomyssk local branch of the «United Russia» party, member of the Presidium of the Regional Political Council «United Russia» party, member of the Local Political Council, Secretary of the Primary Branch of the United Russia Party Number 2 in city Nevinnomyssk.

On November 16, 2021, he was re-elected mayor of Nevinnomyssk for a second term.

On December 20, 2023, he joined the Russian Movement of Children and Youth, became a participant and mentor of the youth movement.

29 May 2026 year Minenkov resigned as mayor of Nevinnomyssk. He led the city for 10 years. Victoria Sokolyuk was appointed acting mayor city.

== Awards ==
- Hero of the Russian Federation (2000).
- Medal "For Services to the Stavropol Territory" (2021).
- Medal "For Services to the Republic of Dagestan" (2024).
- Commendation from the First Deputy Head of the Presidential Administration of the Russian Federation (2023).
- Letter of Thanks from the President of the Russian Federation (2024).
- Letter of Thanks from the President of the Russian Federation (2026).
