= Mikhaylovskoye Urban Settlement =

Mikhaylovskoye Urban Settlement is the name of several municipal formations in Russia.

- Mikhaylovskoye Urban Settlement, a municipal formation which the work settlement of Mikhaylovka and the village of Subbotina in Cheremkhovsky District of Irkutsk Oblast are incorporated as
- Mikhaylovskoye Urban Settlement, a municipal formation which the town of district significance of Mikhaylov in Mikhaylovsky District of Ryazan Oblast is incorporated as
- Mikhaylovskoye Urban Settlement, a municipal formation which the Town of Mikhaylovsk and ten rural localities in Nizhneserginsky District of Sverdlovsk Oblast are incorporated as

== See also ==
- Mikhaylovsky (disambiguation)
