= Mikhaylovka =

Mikhaylovka or Mikhailovka (Russian: Михайловка) stands for Mykhailivka culture (3600—3000 BCE). It may refer to:

== Armenia ==
- Mikhailovka, alternative spelling of Mikhayelovka, a town in Lori Province
- Mikhaylovka, former name of Chambarak, a town in Gegharkunik Province
- Mikhaylovka, former name of Hankavan, a village in Kotayk Province

== Azerbaijan ==
- Mixaylovka (Mikhaylovka), a village in Goygol District
- Mikhaylovka, alternative name of Niyazoba, a village in Khachmaz District

== Kyrgyzstan ==
- Mikhaylovka, Issyk Kul, a village in Issyk-Kul Region
- Mikhaylovka, Jalal-Abad, a village in Jalal-Abad Region

== Russia ==
- Mikhaylovka, Russia, several inhabited localities

== Ukraine ==
- Mykhailivka, Chernivtsi Raion, Chernivtsi Oblast, a village in Chernivtsi Oblast
- Mikhaylivka, Vinnytsia Oblast (Mikhaylovka), a village in Vinnytsia Oblast
- Mykhailivka culture (3600—3000 BCE)

== See also ==
- Michael (disambiguation)
- Mikhaylov (disambiguation)
- Mikhaylovsk
- Mikhaylovsky (disambiguation)
- Mykhailivka
