= Pronya (disambiguation) =

Pronya may refer to several rivers:

- Pronya, a tributary of the Oka in Russia
- Pronia, a tributary of the Sozh in Belarus
