= Nevinnomyssk =

City in Stavropol Krai, Russia

Nevinnomyssk Невинномысск
- City
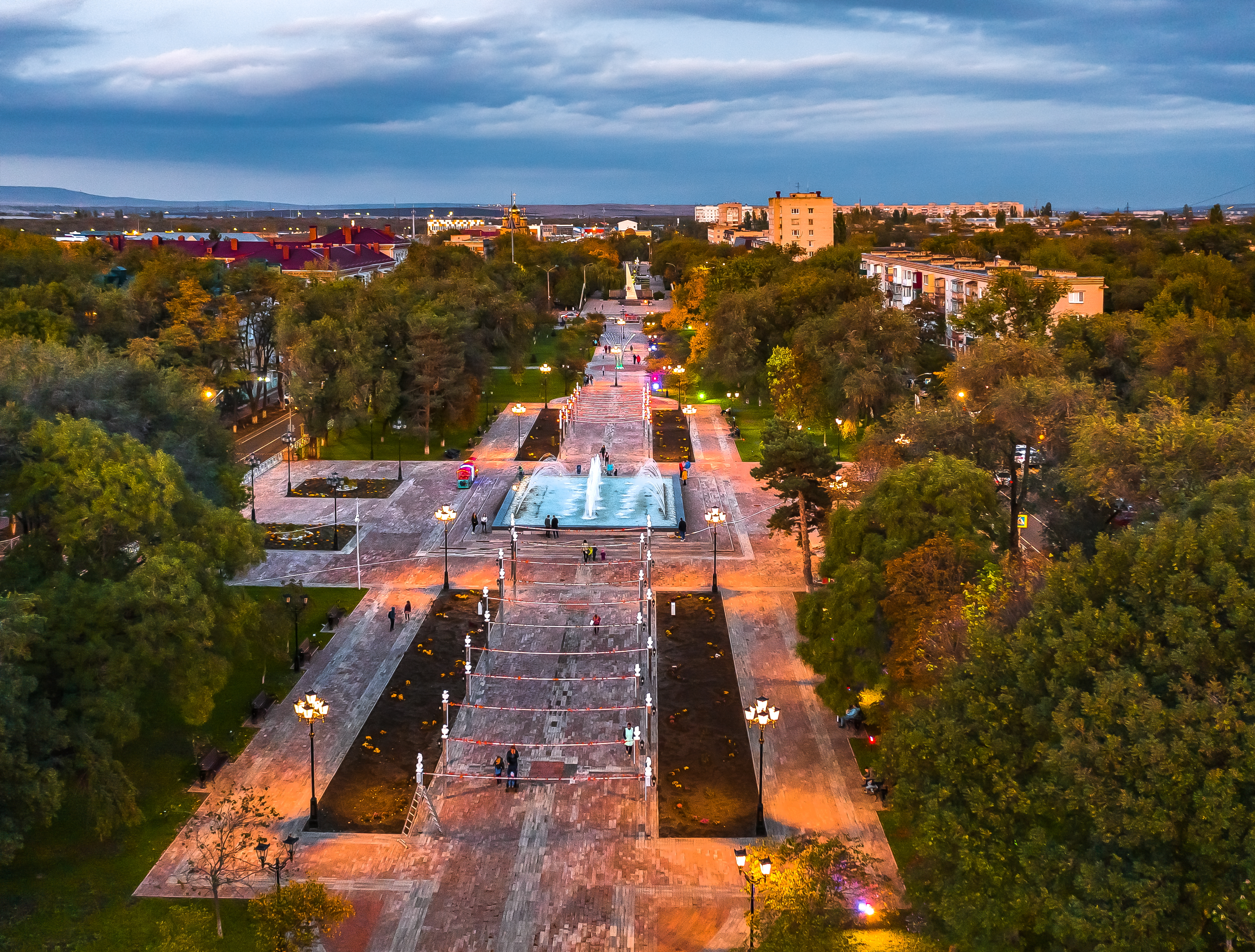

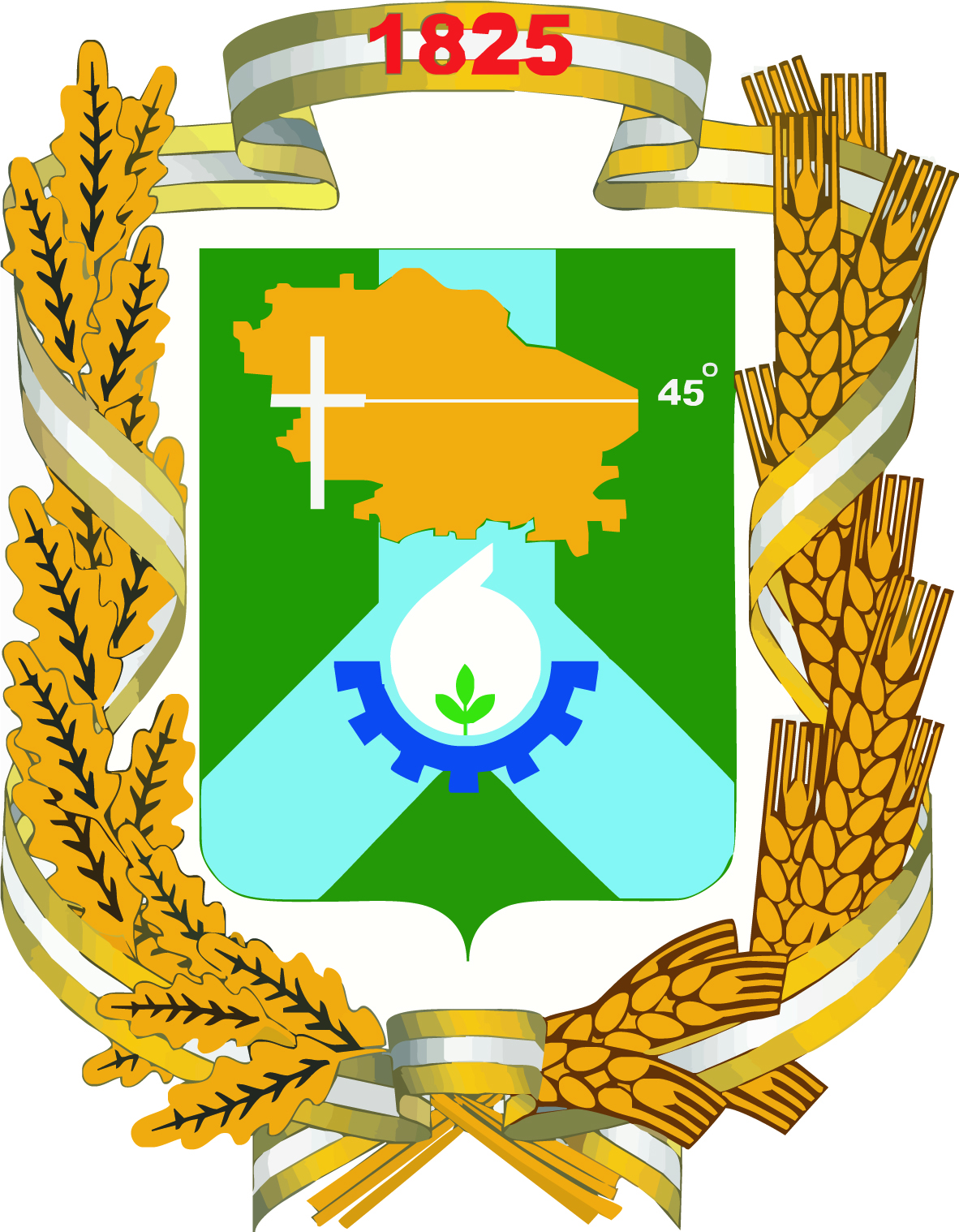
- Flag Coat of arms
- Interactive map of Nevinnomyssk
- Location of Nevinnomyssk Nevinnomyssk (Europe)
- Coordinates: 44°38′N 41°56′E
- Country: Russia
- Federal subject: Stavropol Krai
- Founded: 1825
- City status since: 1939

Government
  - Body: The Council of the city of Nevinnomyssk
  - Mayor to the city: Victoria Sokolyuk (acting)
  - Chairman of the City Council: Tatiana Oleshkevich

Area
  - Total: 100.397 km^{2} (38.763 sq mi)
- Elevation: 320 m (1,050 ft)

Population
  - Estimate (2019): 116 884 )

Administrative status
  - Subordinated to: city of krai significance of Nevinnomyssk
  - Capital of: city of krai significance of Nevinnomyssk

Municipal status
  - Urban okrug: Nevinnomyssk Urban Okrug
  - Capital of: Nevinnomyssk Urban Okrug
- Time zone: UTC+3 (MSK)
- Postal code: 357100
- Dialing code: +7 86554
- OKTMO ID: 07724000001
- Website: nevadm.ru

Nevinnomyssk (Russian: Невинномысск) is a city in Stavropol Krai, Russia, located on both banks of the Kuban River at its confluence with the Bolshoy Zelenchuk River, 54 kilometers (34 mi) south of Stavropol.

== History ==
The city of Nevinnomyssk originated from stanitsa Nevinnomysskaya.

Military historian Vasily about 100 years ago, I found a file from 1784 in the Mozdok archive, from which I learned that "a certain small river flowing into the Kuban was henceforth ordered to be called Innocent".

Stavropol local historian Kolesnikov in his monograph "The Past of the Innocent Cape" (2011) puts forward a version of the origin of the city's name, according to which in 1784 Pavel Potemkin the area was given the name "Innocent Cape" by the prevailing.

In 1787, the Nevinnomyssky Redoubt was built on a high hill near the Nevinka River, which flows into the Kuban River. In 1784, the river was renamed the Nevinnaya River.

According to the first version, the name originated from the death of an innocent girl who was forced to marry someone she did not love.

According to the second version, the name of the river and the cape originated from the death of 70 innocent Russian women, old people, and children. In their memory, the place was named Cape Innocent, and the tributary of the Kuban River was named the Innocent River.

In 1825, by order of General Aleksey Yermolov, commander of the Caucasian Military Corps, a Cossack village of the same name was founded near the fortress of Nevinnaya Mys, where the Bolshoy Zelenchuk River flows into the Kuban River.

The new village became part of the Batalpashinsky Department of the Kuban Cossack Army. After that, the rapid development of the village of Nevinnomysskaya began.

The village received 36,817 acres of land, including 26,847 acres suitable for agricultural activities. In the late 1870s, there were 11 officer's and 1,597 Cossack plots in Nevinnomysskaya. On average, each person had 16.6 acres of land.

On the small village square, there was a village government building, an ataman's house, a store, and watchtowers at the village gates. The village was governed by a regimental commander and a village chief.

As of 1849, the village had an apothecary, a barber shop, a telegraph, and a water supply system. Administratively, the village was divided into twelve quarters.

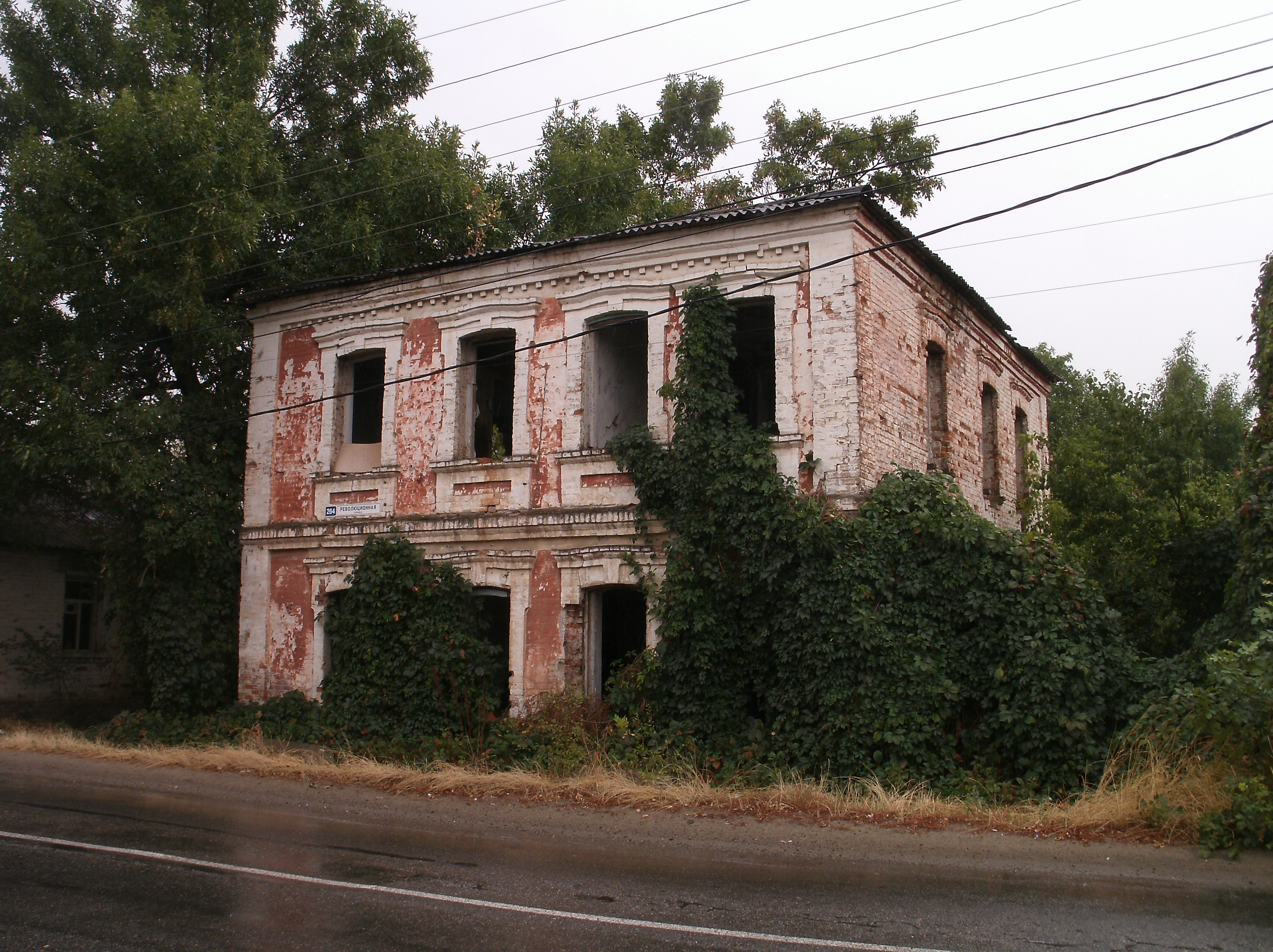
A dilapidated 19th-century house

Until 1861, the influx of non-local residents was insignificant. However, with the abolition of serfdom, the situation changed. In 1876, there were 1,700 non-local residents for every 4,000 Cossacks. The construction of the Vladikavkaz Railway had a significant impact on the village's fate.

The presence of large reserves of agricultural raw materials, the availability of cheap labor, and the proximity of the railway contributed to the rapid economic development of the village of Nevinnomysskaya.

The village of Otradnaya, where the son-in-law of the Ataman of Nevinnomysskaya, I. A. Baranov, began construction of a steam mill. In 1894, it was put into operation, becoming the largest mill in the North Caucasus.

In 1889, a tannery was built by the merchant Lapin. In 1895, the largest wool-processing factory in Russia was built in the village.

The favorable climatic conditions, such as mild winters, plenty of sunshine, and windy weather, as well as the availability of soft water in the Zelenchuk River, the presence of a well-developed sheep farming industry in the region, and the availability of cheap labor, as well as the proximity of the railway, all contributed to the development of the wool-washing industry. Initially, wool was processed manually, using methods such as raft washing and outdoor drying. The soft water from the Zelenchuk River helped to soften and whiten the wool, and the use of detergents was significantly reduced during the washing process.

In 1900, Lapin's ever-expanding wool-washing factory produced goods worth 280,740 rubles. At the beginning of the 20th century, the factory employed approximately 300 workers. Moreover, the factory's equipment was in line with the latest advancements in scientific and technological development.

In 1912, Nevinnomyssk entrepreneurs established a small mechanical factory called "Muravey" based on the principles of a joint-stock company. This factory consisted of a foundry, a turning shop, a blacksmith shop, and a locksmith shop. The plant focused on producing products needed in the local market, parts for agricultural machinery, agricultural tools, and mill equipment.

Handicraft production, such as shoe-making, saddlery, and cooperage, developed in the village. Carpenters, artisans, and glaziers were mostly from other cities. In the 1890s, the village of Nevinnomyssk became a major trading center. Merchants from Moscow, Nizhny Novgorod, and Warsaw came to the village. The trade turnover at the Nevinnomyssk fairs and bazaars reached several million rubles.

At the turn of the 19th and 20th centuries, the village's agriculture achieved significant success. The number of livestock, the production of agricultural products and animal husbandry are growing. New agricultural machinery and equipment are increasingly being used. At the beginning of the 20th century, the village had 57 horse-drawn threshing machines and 160 improved ploughs. 4 In general, the Cossacks of the village harvested a good harvest, especially grain crops, which allowed them to profitably sell some of their products for export abroad and to the industrial regions of Russia. The spread of various forms of cooperation played a major role in the intensification of agriculture in the village.

By 1896, the village had a population of 7,500, indicating a rapid increase in the population of Nevinnomyssk.

The favorable climatic conditions allowed the Cossacks to actively engage in horticulture, viticulture, and gardening, which undoubtedly influenced the dietary patterns of the population in Nevinnomyssk and the Kuban region as a whole. The local population consumed a significant amount of fruits and berries, including garden and wild apples, pears, plums, grapes, blackberries, and more. At the turn of the 19th and 20th centuries, many families began to focus on growing strawberries. Fruits were dried for the winter, and "jams" were increasingly being made from them. Among the Cossacks' drinks, kvass, dried fruit compote, beer, wine, and vodka were prevalent. One indicator of the growth of prosperity was the fact that in the mid-19th century, almost all alcoholic beverages were produced by the Cossacks themselves.

At the beginning of the 20th century, the village's educational system expanded, and new educational institutions were established in addition to the existing parish schools.

In 1901, the Vladikavkaz Railway Board opened a two-year school at the Nevinnomysskaya station, accommodating up to 90 railway workers' [[children]0. Four years later, the school was transformed into a three-year school. In the same year, a non-resident partnership purchased two buildings from Lapin, the owner of a wool-washing establishment, for 6,000 rubles and opened a two-year school for non-resident children.

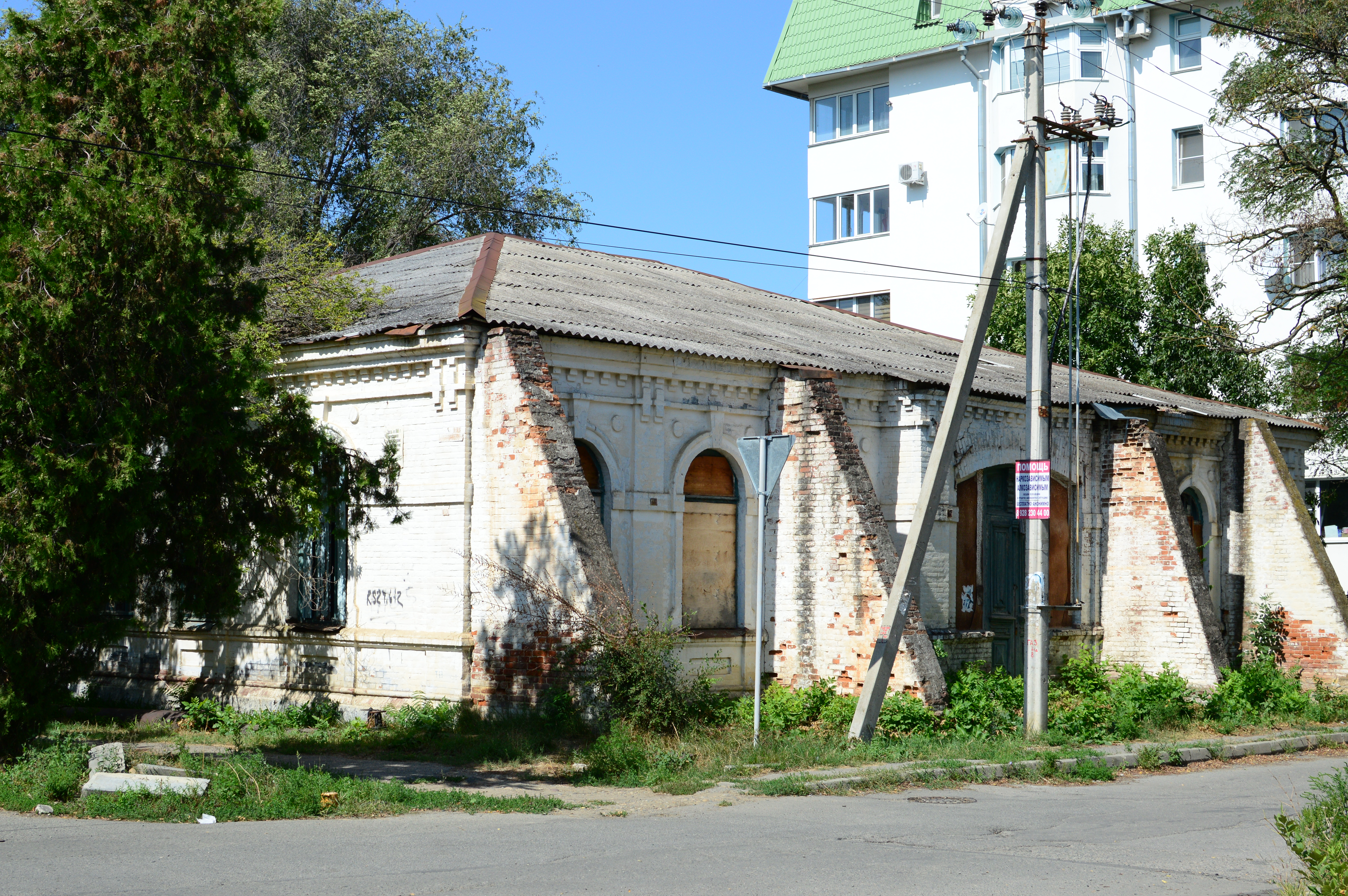
Former village administration building

By the beginning of the 20th century, the village faced a severe shortage of primary education. In 1904, there were at least 3,500-4,000 school-age children in Nevinnomysskaya, but only 300-450 of them were enrolled, including 25-30 girls.

In 1908, two one-class schools in the village were transformed into two-class schools with a five-year term of study. By the same year, the village board had built 2 more single-class schools: "Northern" (near the current dairy) and on "Nizki".

In 1916, a higher primary school with a four-year course was opened on the basis of the Cossack two-year college with a five-year term of study. They were accepted into the first grade here after graduating from the third grade of primary school 7..

In 1917, a gymnasium was opened in Nevinnomysskaya (in the early 20s it was transformed into an ordinary nine-year—old school for peasant youth), which served as an indicator of the interest of the residents and authorities of the village in creating a full-fledged gymnasium in the future.. Stolypin's agrarian reform is had a limited impact on the village of Nevinnomysskaya. The village's industry continued to develop..

In February 1917, on the territory Nevinnomysskaya lacked fuel, steam locomotives, and wagons. Traffic jams on the tracks have become commonplace. Cargo turnover has been sharply reduced. Later in people, were preparing to form territory Nevinnomysskaya their own trade union.

In May 1917, the board of the union was elected at the general meeting of workers. At the same time, in May, the woolmashers teamed up with the workers of the Baranov mill and created a professional wool-washing, leather-milling union, of which 546 workers and employees were members.

As soon as it appeared, the union immediately presented the factory and mill owners with demands to introduce an eight-hour workday and increase wages. The entrepreneurs were forced to make concessions to the workers. In August 1917, a "New Life" circle was established at the wool washery with the aim of creating a workers' club and library.

On October 28, 1917, the news of the Bolshevik victory reached the village of Nevinnomysskaya by telegraph.

On November 18, 1917, the Government of the South-Eastern Union of Cossack Troops. The village of Nevinnomysskaya, along with the entire Batalpashinsky district, became part of the Union.

Thanks to the hard work of the workers, the wool-washing factory was restored, and by 1921, it was processing several tens of thousands of poods of wool, producing 55,000 yards of cloth and 1,500 poods of yarn.

During the 1920s, the village's economy was restored, and the consequences of the civil war and famine were eliminated. Peasants and Cossacks increased their plowing, and the number of livestock on their farms increased. More goods were available on the market, but the pre-revolutionary standard of living was not achieved. At the same time, legal barriers between Cossacks and peasants were eliminated, although they still existed on a daily basis.

On June 2, 1924, the village of Nevinnomysskaya was transformed from a volost center into a district center within the North Caucasus Territory. A district party committee was established in the village. Hart was elected as the secretary, and the district council and executive committee were established. Baranov was elected as the first chairman of the Nevinnomyssky district executive committee. The Nevinnomyssky district covered an area of 1,923.5 square versts and included 15 village councils: Barsukovsky, Belometsky, Kalininsky, Velikoknyazhesky, Kazminsky, Ivanovsky, Krasno-Derevensky, Malorossiysky, Nevinnomyssky, Novo-Derevensky, Novo-Yekaterininskiy and others.

According to the 1926 census, the population was 55.9% Russian and 34.4% Ukrainian. In February 1928, the first collective farm was established in the village, however, the vast majority of the villagers preferred to keep their own farms.

On October 11, 1939, the Presidium of the Supreme Soviet of the Russian Soviet Federative Socialist Republic issued a decree transforming Nevinnomysskaya into the city of Nevinnomyssk.

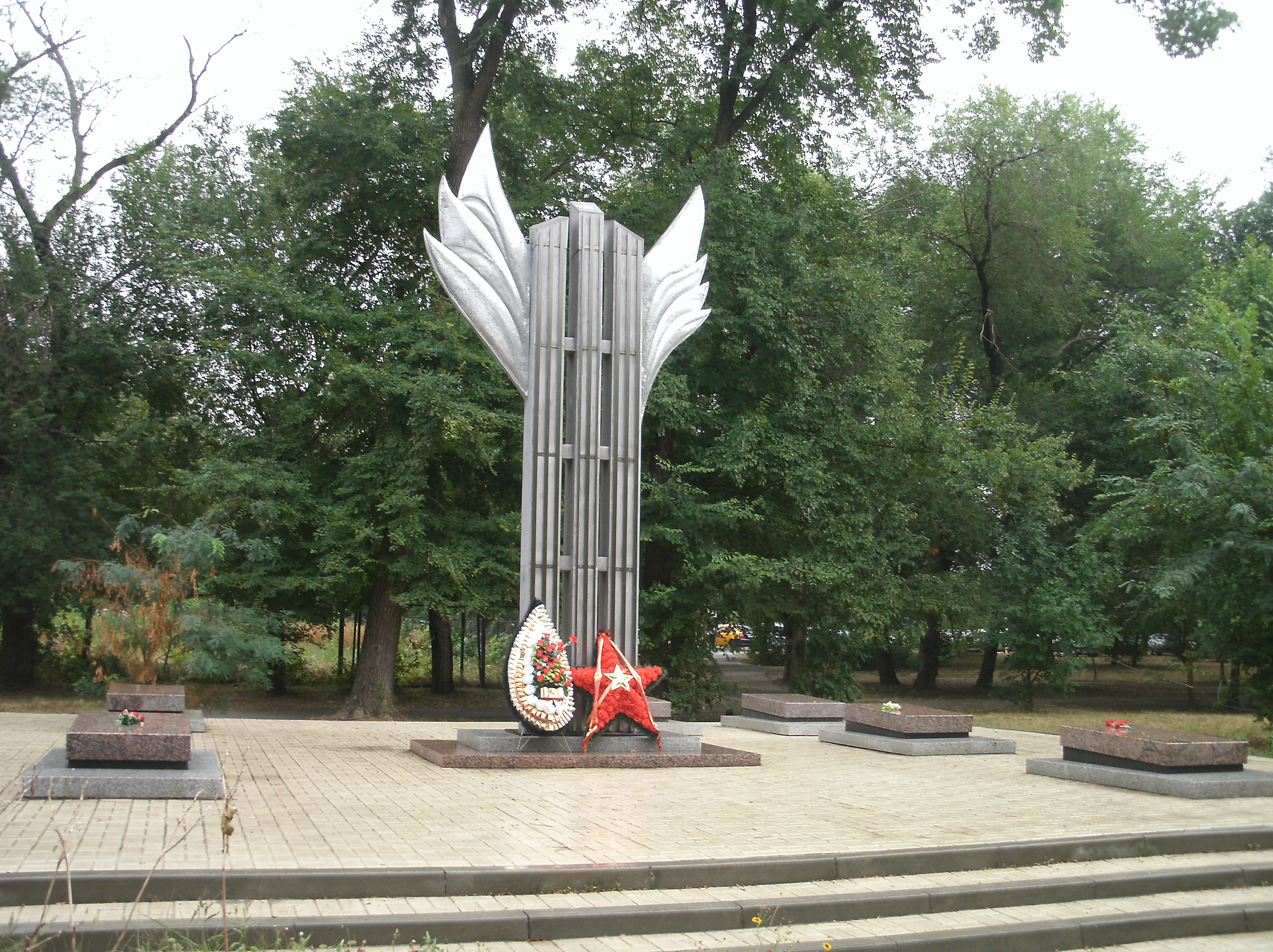
Mass grave of Soviet soldiers fallen in World War II

1,499 people were conscripted to the Soviet army and sent to the front from the city during the first week of the German invasion of the Soviet Union during World War II, and 15,670 were drafted by the local military office from 1941 to 1945. Local residents fought on all fronts and in all branches of the Soviet Armed Forces. For geographic reasons, the city was not well defended, so it was easily captured by the Germans in mid-1942. Over 800 civilians were killed in the city during the German occupation. Almost all of the city's industrial enterprises, institution, and agricultural facilities were destroyed and looted. In January 1943, the Soviets recaptured the city. Several thousand Nevinnomyssk residents did not return from the war. Despite this, the city was rebuilt in record time.

However, the city truly came to life in the second half of the 1950s and early 1970s.

Many residents of Nevinnomyssk achieved significant success in the public and political sphere in the 1960s and 1980s, thus making their hometown famous. Among them, Marshal Kulikov stands out.

In the 1960s and 1980s, the city's cultural and social spheres developed rapidly. During this period, the Sherstyanik House of Culture and Park, the Khimikov House of Culture and Recreation, the Gorky House of Culture, the Khimtekhnikum House of Culture, the Mir and Ogonek cinemas, the Central Library with 10 branches, the city's local history museum, more than 50 monuments and memorial sites, the No. 1 and No. 2 Music Schools, the Art School, and several other facilities were constructed. The Rodina cinema, which later became a modern cultural institution, also saw significant development.

In Nevinnomyssk, 16 club formations, 41 clubs, and amateur associations were established and operated (1998), with a total of 1,680 participants. In 1991, the local organization of the Russian Union of Youth began operating in the city, and in 2005, a youth policy committee was established within the city administration, promoting the development and support of local youth. Various sports and youth events were actively organized in the city, and efforts were made to support the younger generation.

In the last third of the 20th century, the city established an extensive and well-functioning network of educational institutions. In 1998, there were 20 municipal educational institutions, 4 primary schools, 16 secondary schools, 1 basic school, 2 gymnasiums, 2 lyceums, a Children's House, 4 additional education institutions, and 32 preschool institutions in the city.

The city is home to the Nevinnomyssk Energy College, the Chemical College, the Technical University, the Nevinnomyssk Regional Institute of Continuing and Professional Education, the Polytechnic College, and the Agricultural Lyceum 11. Later, the city established the Medical College and the Nevinnomyssk Medical Institute, a branch of the North Caucasus Federal University, and the Institute of Economics, Management, and Law. Currently, modern schools and kindergartens are being actively constructed.

Today, the city has a fairly wide network of medical and preventive facilities, including a city hospital and polyclinic, a branch of a diagnostic medical center, an infectious disease hospital, a tuberculosis dispensary, a skin and venereal disease dispensary, a narcology dispensary, a health dispensary, dental clinics, the Zhuravlik sanatorium, and an ambulance station.

In 2002, Nevinnomyssk experienced one of the most devastating natural disasters in the city's history. The flood was caused by heavy rainfall, leading to a sharp increase in water levels in the Kuban River and its tributaries. The water pressure destroyed the coastal fortifications, which led to the flooding of large areas of the city. Residential buildings, social facilities, and agricultural land were flooded. Some houses were almost in the middle of the raging river, with water reaching their roofs. Most of the city's Zakubanskaya zone was flooded, leaving residents without electricity, drinking water, or gas. The water overflowed the bridges over the Kuban River, cutting off the flooded part of the city from Nevinnomyssk. Heavy military equipment and helicopters were used to rescue people, and people were taken off rooftops and trees. The flood also caused significant damage to the city's and the region's economy, with agricultural land, commercial facilities, and service industries being damaged or destroyed.

On October 11, 2008, a monument dedicated to the heroic deeds of the residents of the city of Nevinnomyssk, who participated in the elimination of the consequences of the Chernobyl disaster nuclear power plant accident in the city of Pripyat in the Ukrainian Soviet Socialist Republic, was erected on Belovo Street Nevinnowyssk. 180 residents of Nevinnomyssk took part in the elimination of the consequences of this accident.

In 2015, Nadezhda Mikhailovna Bogdanova, a former employee of the city's education sector, was elected mayor of Nevinnomyssk. She is the first and only woman in the history of Nevinnomyssk to hold the position of mayor.

On November 16, 2016, Mikhaul Minenkov, a Hero of Russia, was elected as the new mayor of Nevinnomyssk. He has been in this position for 10 years.

On December 22, 2017, the Government of the Russian Federation adopted a resolution establishing a territory for advanced socioeconomic development within the city limits. The corresponding resolution was signed by Russian Prime Minister Dmitry Medvedev.

In 2020-2022, the city of Nevinnomyssk actively fought against the coronavirus pandemic, a dead virus, that came to Russia from China. The city's epidemiological situation was monitored, volunteers delivered medicines to the population and provided assistance to doctors, medical professionals treated people, and information was disseminated about the importance of wearing masks and getting vaccinated. Medical workers received 10,000 reusable masks, 5,000 pairs of gloves, and 1,000 non-woven overalls to protect themselves from the coronavirus. In addition, during the lockdown, volunteers from the city of Nevinnomyssk brought food packages to those in need. They visited single mothers, large families, and low-income individuals. After the lockdown ended, volunteers distributed protective masks to citizens on the streets.

The city's participation in Russia's National Projects

For many years, the city of Nevinnomyssk has been an active participant in the federal project "Creating a Comfortable Urban Environment" as part of the Housing and Urban Environment National Project. As part of this project, the city has improved its parks, including the park near the Olympic Ice Palace, the park in the old town, the public spaces on Mira Boulevard, the recreation area in the Pravokubansky district, the park on Mayakovsky Street, and others. Other national projects of the Russian Federation, such as "Youth and Children," "Education," and "Safe and High-Quality Roads," are also being actively implemented in Nevinnomyssk. As part of the national project on youth policy, much attention is being paid to supporting local youth.

== Administrative and municipal status ==
Within the framework of administrative divisions, it is incorporated as the city of krai significance of Nevinnomyssk— an administrative unit with the status equal to that of the districts. As a municipal division, the city of krai significance of Nevinnomyssk is incorporated as Nevinnomyssk Urban Okrug.

The city consists of the central part on the right bank of the Kuban, as well as microdistricts with informal names: Mill, microdistricts Factory, Rozhdestvenskoye, Krasnaya Derevnya, Nizki, PRP, MZhK, Pravokubansky, ZIP, Golovnoye, Old City, House of Life, settlement, BAN, as well as Garden Associations.

== Symbols of the city ==
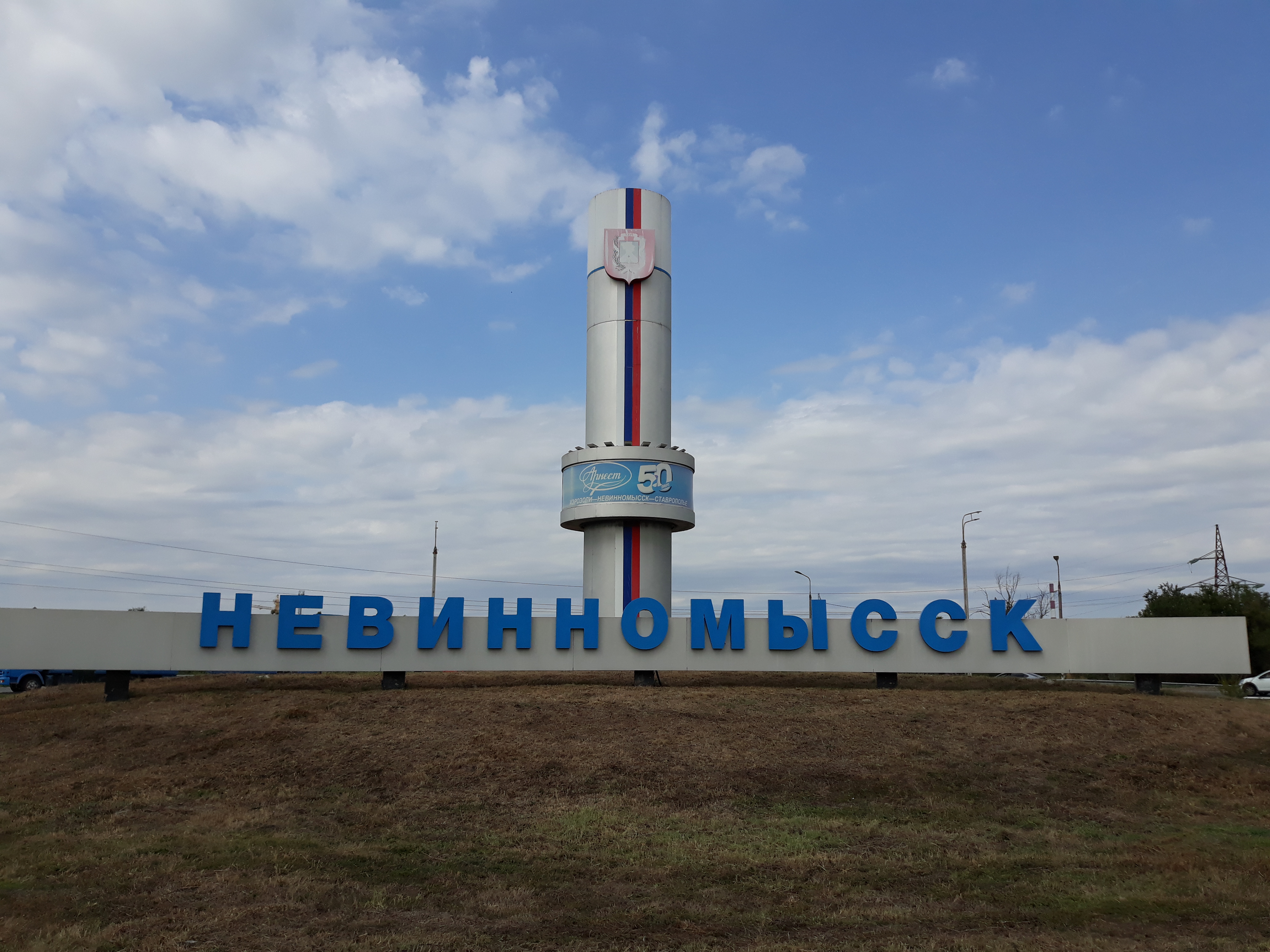
The stele of the municipality at the entrance to the city of Nevinnomyssk

The coat of arms of the municipal formation of the city district — the city of Nevinnomyssk, Stavropol Territory — is a framed heraldic shield. The main background of the shield is green. The main figure, made in blue, symbolizes the cape at the confluence of two rivers, thus reflecting the location of the city at the confluence of the rivers Kuban and Bolshoy Zelenchuk, as well as explaining the origin of the city's name.

In the lower part of the shield, at the junction of the river branches, a chemical flask with a plant inside is depicted, framed from below by a gear, which indicates the main specifics of the city as one of the largest industrial centers of the Stavropol Territory. The bulb is white, the plant is green, and the gear is blue. In the upper part of the shield there is a detail Stavropol regional coat of arms in the form of a map of the Stavropol Territory with a cross and a line of the forty-fifth parallel.

The flag of the municipal formation of the urban district of the city of Nevinnomyssk is a rectangular banner with a width-to-length ratio of 2:3, divided by a blue forked cross into three parts: a green one (at the hoist) and two yellow ones (at the top and bottom). The forked cross symbolizes the confluence of the Zelenchuk and Kuban rivers, and the triangle formed by them represents the cape. The rest of the flag represents the territory of the Stavropol Territory, which is crossed by the Kuban River.

Green is the color of youth and life, nature, spring and prosperity, hope and health. Blue is the color of honor, glory, truth, loyalty, and virtue, as well as clear skies and water. Yellow is the color of prosperity and peace, fertility, and wealth, represented by gold and bread. The yellow color indicates the city's administrative affiliation with the Stavropol Territory, mirroring the color of the regional flag. The cape and rivers are also elements of the Nevinnomyssk city coat of arms..

== Physical and geographical characteristics ==
Geographical location

The city of Nevinnomyssk is located in the Pre-Caucasus, on the Stavropol upland, along the banks of the Kuban River|Kuban]], at the confluence of the Bolshoy Zelenchuk river, 55 km south of the regional city center Stavropol. The Nevinnomyssk Canal begins in Nevinnomyssk, which supplies water from the Kuban River to the Bolshoy Egorlyk River.

Time zone

The city of Nevinnomyssk, like the entire Stavropol Territory, is located in the time zone designated by the international standard as Moscow Time Zone (MSK), and the time coincides with the zone time.

== Demographics ==
Historical population
Year	Pop.	±%
1849	2,037	—
1926	16,327	+701.5%

At the end of the 20th/beginning of the 21st century, for several years, Nevinnomyssk was the second largest city in terms of population in Stavropol Krai, after Stavropol. The second largest city is now Pyatigorsk.

== Politics ==
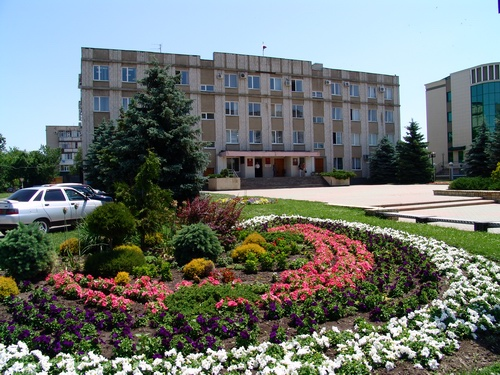
Photo of Nevinnomyssk city administration

The structure of local self-government bodies in the city consists of:

- City Duma-representative authority of the city
- head of a city-the head of a municipality.
- city administration — Executive and administrative body of the city;
- control and accounting chamber of the city.

Chapter of city

- Anatoly Semenchenko;
- Viktor Ledovsky;
- Konstantin Khramov
- from July 2012 to April 21, 2015 — Sergey Batynyuk;
- from April 21, 2015, to November 16, 2016 — Nadezhda Bogdanova;
- since November 16, 2016 to 29 May 2026 — Michaul Minenkov.

Heads Of Administration:

- from May 29, 2015, to November 2016-Vasily Shestak.
- Since November 2016, the post of head of Administration is combined by the head of the city.

Chairman of the city Duma

- Alexander Medyanik (2016-2025).
- Tatiana Oleshkevich (from 2025).

== Modern technology ==
Nevinnomyssk is actively implementing a smart city system. To date, several modules from the "smart city" system are successfully operating in the city.

There are plans to install "smart stops" and a number of other innovations.

== Culture ==
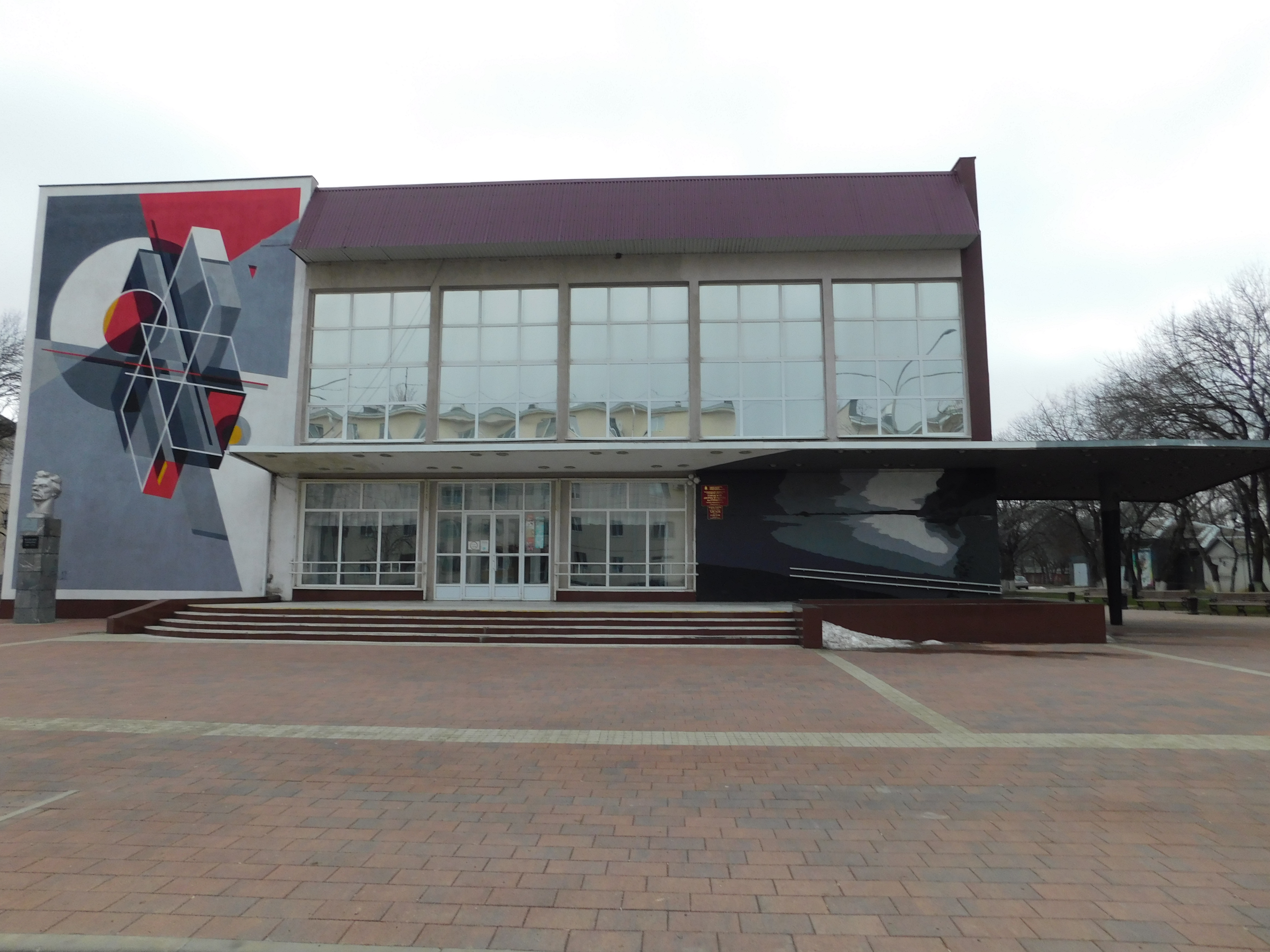
Gorky City Palace of Culture

- Gorky City Palace of Culture.
- Palace of Culture of Chemists. It was opened in December 1962.
- The first Nevinnomyssk industrial theater.
- Modern Cultural and Leisure Center "RODINA"
- Municipal institution "Parks of culture and recreation" of the city of Nevinnomyssk.
- Victory Park
- Park "Sherstyannik"
- Mayakovsky Square (Fabrika District)

== Transport ==
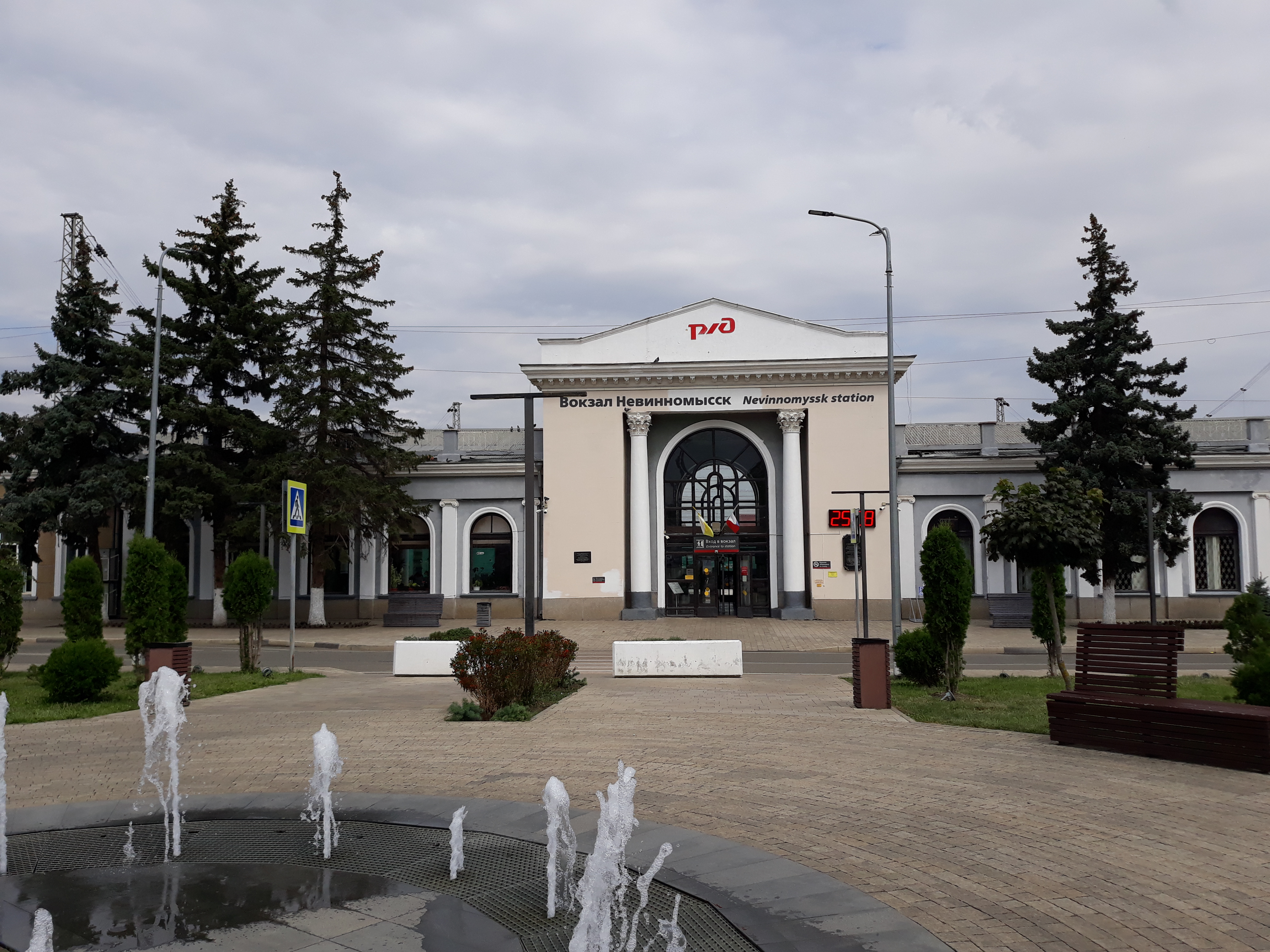
Railway station

Public transport operates in the city: buses and minibuses, taxis are available.

== Recreation areas ==
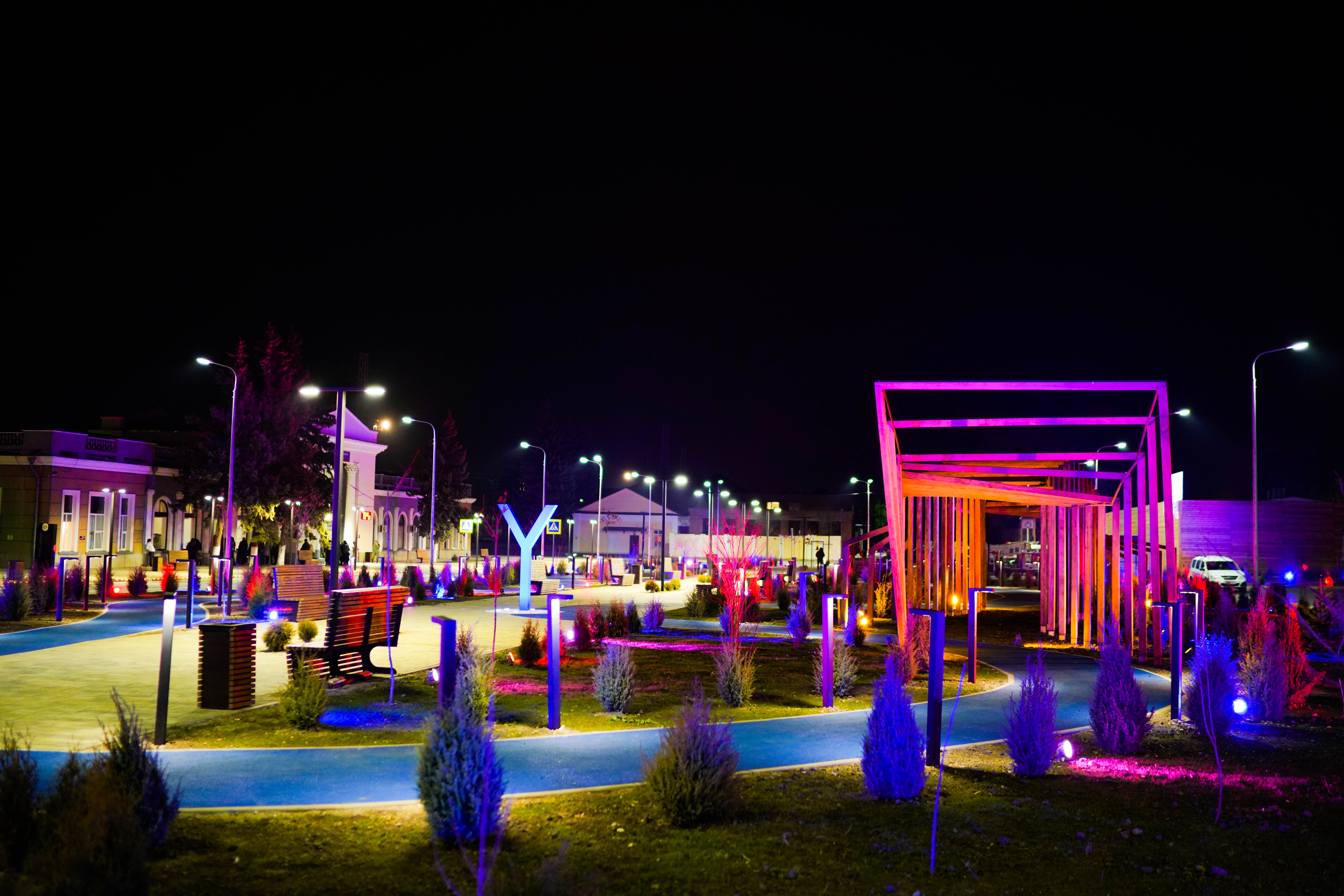
Recreation area near the city station in Nevinnomyssk

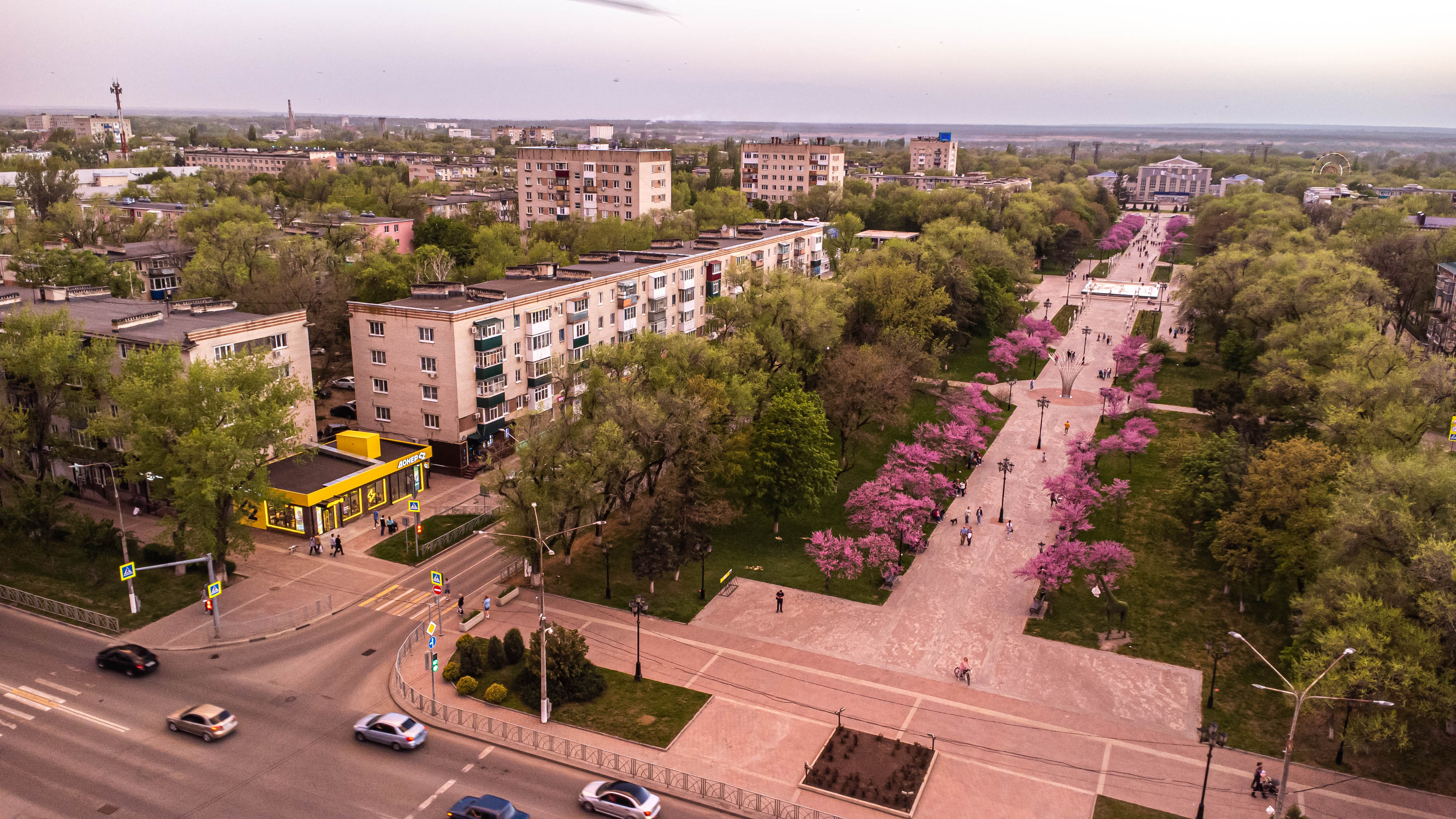
The central square in Nevinnomyssk, Mira Boulevard

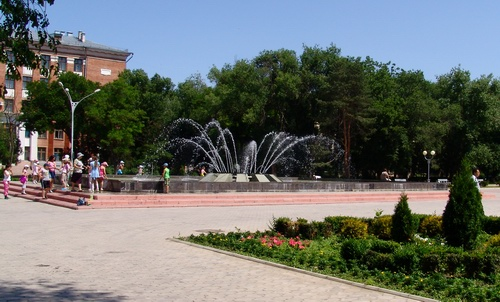
Fountain in the city center

There are many public areas, recreation zones, and points of attraction in Nevinnomyssk. These include the Mira Boulevard, the Sherstyannik Park, the squares on Mayakovsky Street and in the Pravokubansky District, the Victory Park, recreation area in front of the Kuban Hotel, the Park in the Old City District, the square on Prp, the city beach, and the local embankment, which is planned to be modernized and renovated in the future.

Over the past 6 years, 8 significant public spaces have been improved in Nevinnomyssk. Nevinnomyssk is an active participant in the federal project "Creating a Comfortable Urban Environment" as part of the national project "Housing and Urban Environment." Since 2019, the city has implemented 8 large-scale improvement projects. These include the improvement of the Mira Boulevard from Mendeleev Street to Gagarin Street and from Gagarin Street to the Registry Office, the Victory Park on Kalinin Street, the skate park on Mendeleev Street, the park on Mayakovsky Street (up to Shevchenko Street), and the park near the Kuban Hotel. This year, the Michurin Street park, which was the winner of the national project's rating vote last year, has been transformed. It now features a playground, benches, and trash cans, as well as designated seating areas and landscaping.

In addition, the city's youth policy infrastructure is actively developing in Nevinnomyssk, and the municipality ha|thumb|left|290px|s become the winner of the Federal Agency for Youth Affairs "Region for Young" national competition. A local Youth House will be built in the city.

== Healthcare ==
The network of medical institutions in the city is represented by 7 medical and preventive institutions.

- Nevinnomyssk city hospital Nevinnomyssk Dental clinic
- GBUZ SK Stavropol Regional clinical specialized psychiatric hospital N.1.
- SK GBUZ "Regional clinical TB dispensary"" the Nevinnomyssk branch of the
- GKUZ SK "Children's regional sanatorium "Zhuravlik"
- Anmo "Stavropol regional clinical consulting and diagnostic center", In Nevinnomyssk branch
- NUZ "Nodal polyclinic at Stavropol station" of JSC "Russian Railways",
- In 2019, on the basis of an order of the government of the Stavropol territory, 7 medical institutions of the city were reorganized by joining the state medical INSTITUTION "City hospital" of Nevinnomyssk (City hospital No. 2, Children's city hospital, city polyclinic No. 1, City polyclinic No. 2, ambulance Station, Nevinnomyssk city medical and rehabilitation center, Nevinnomyssk city medical and sports dispensary).

The structure of the institution is represented by five main divisions (polyclinic, hospital # 1, hospital # 2, Children's hospital, ambulance Station), including a skin and venereal dispensary, maternity hospital, women's consultation, as well as diagnostic, laboratory and other support services.

Currently, within the framework of the Federal program for healthcare modernization, capital and current repairs of buildings of medical institutions are being intensively carried out, and modern medical and household equipment is being purchased. As part of the Federal program to reduce mortality from cardiovascular diseases and provide timely, effective, affordable medical care to patients with impaired cerebral circulation and acute myocardial infarction, a primary vascular department was opened in the city hospital of Nevinnomyssk.

In addition, private clinics and centers operate in the city:

Near Nevinnomyssk in the villages of Kazminskoe and voronezhskoe there are healing thermal springs.

== Youth policy and sports ==
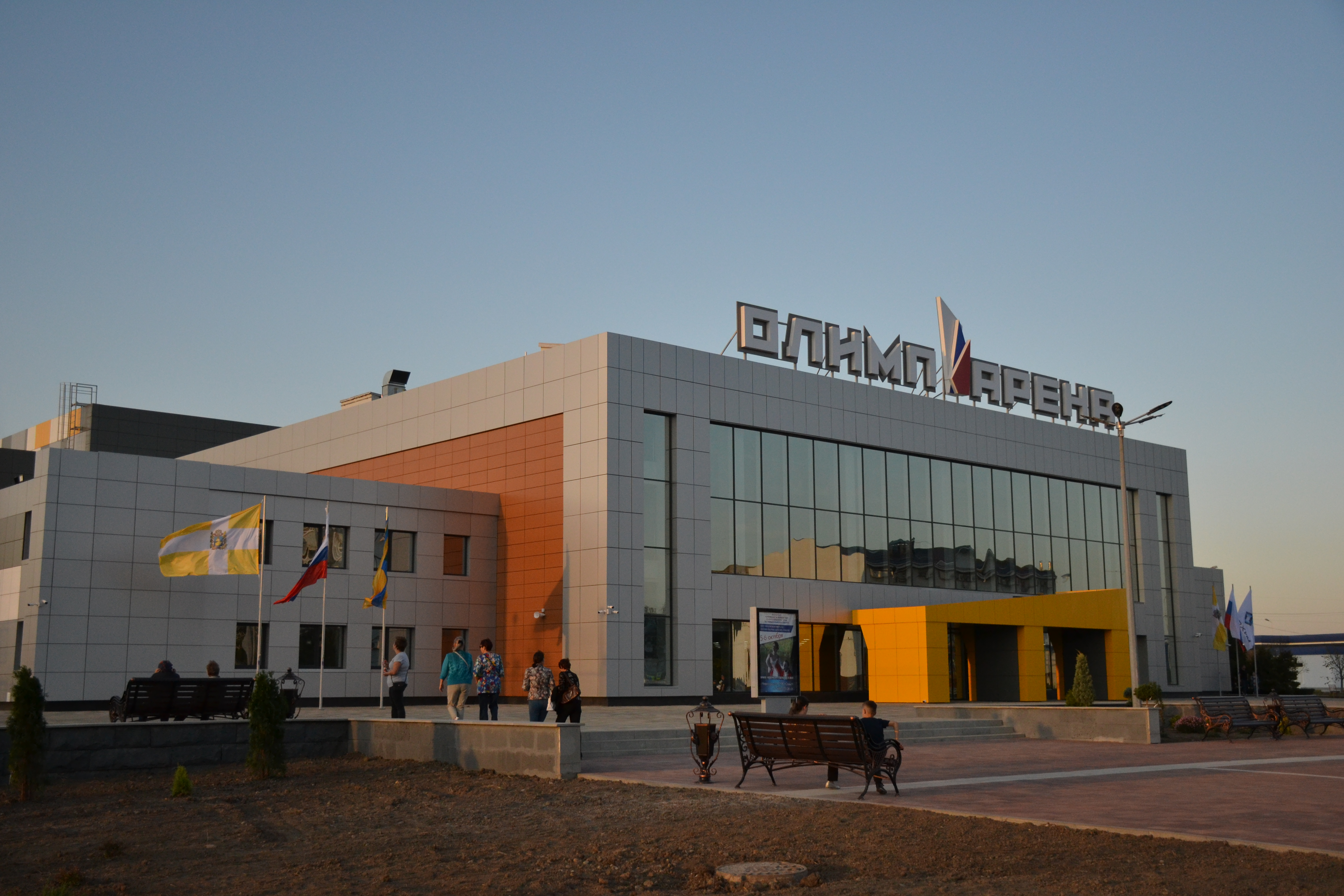
"Olymp-arena"

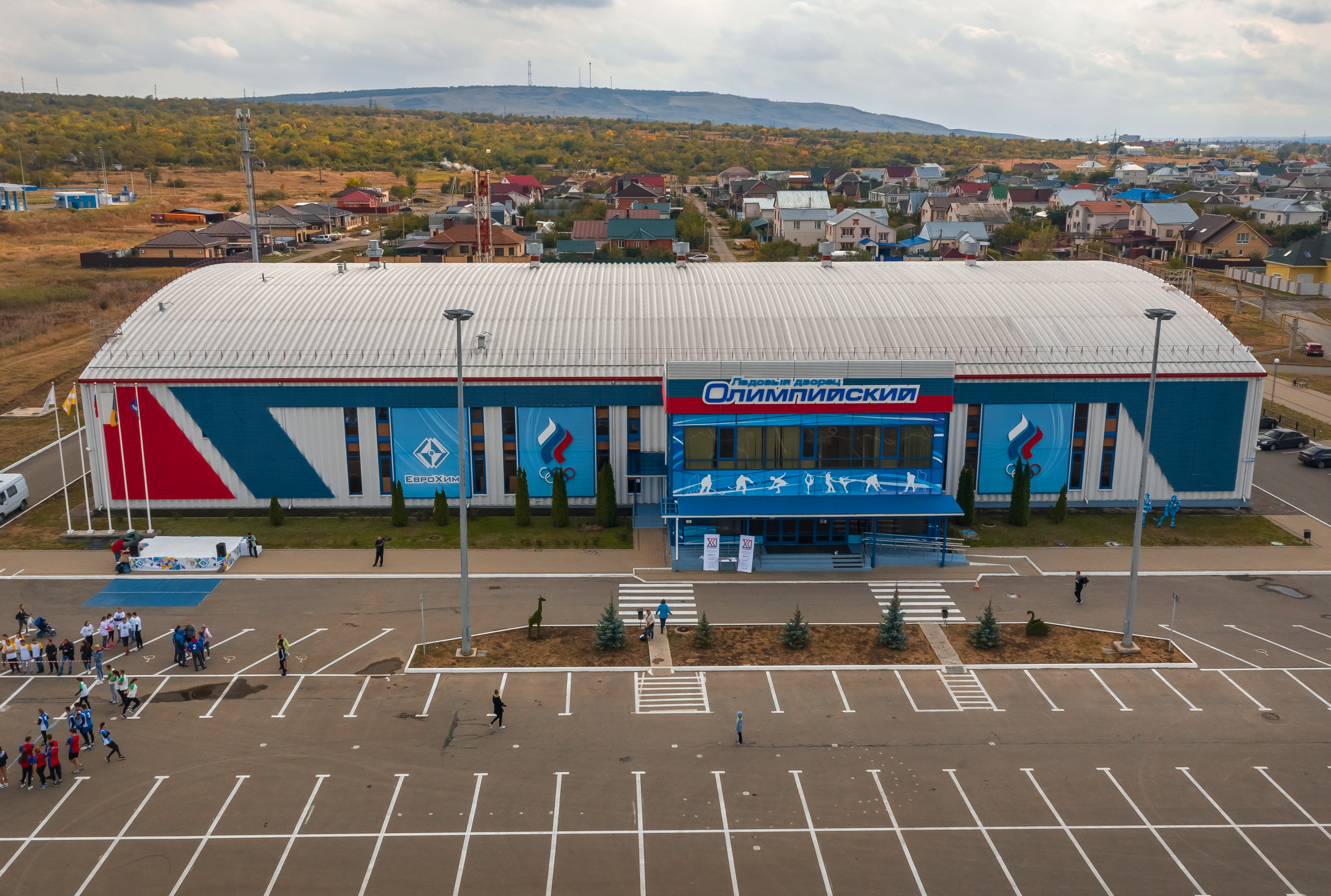
Olympic Ice Palace

- The organizer of major sports and youth events is the Committee on уouth policy, physical culture and sports of the Nevinnomyssk city administration, which also manages several city subordinate institutions: the Olympus Sports Complex, the Olympic Ice Palace (MBU Secondary School of Sports), and the «Record» Sports School.
- Various youth policy events are regularly held for young people living in Nevinnomyssk and large-scale grant projects are being implemented. Among them are the school for activists of children's and youth public associations of the city, the Tourist Rally in Arkhyz, Student's Day, Youth Day, Volunteer Day, New Year and others. Sports and youth competitions of regional, interregional and international level are regularly held on the basis of the Olympic Sports Complex in Nevinnomyssk.
- Olymp-arena sports and cultural complex. Built in the 90s of the XX century. After a large-scale reconstruction completed in 2019, Olymp-arena has become a modern sports complex in the South of Russia with infrastructure that allows hosting international competitions.
- Pool. Children's And Youth Sports School Record.
- Nevinnomyssk Central Sports Stadium (local beach area)
- Stadium «Sherstyanik» in Nevinnomyssk (Fabrika district)
- The stadium" Sports core (Vovkanych). Home stadium of the football team "Nevinnomyssk", until recently took part in the championship of the Stavropol territory. Due to lack of funds, the team was withdrawn from the SC championship and now competes in the kochubeyevsky district championship.
- Vesta children's soccer team. It is based in the building of Lyceum 6.
- Olympic Ice Palace
- «Record» Sports School
- There is a football field in Nizki districts, in Pobeda Park and in other places around the city.
- Points with exercise equipment on the city beach, in the Sherstyannik Park.

== Education ==
There are 36 kindergartens, about 20 schools, lyceums, and gymnasiums in the city. Higher educational institutions include the North Caucasus Federal University, the Institute of Economics, Management, and Law, and the Nevinnomyssk Medical Institute. Secondary educational institutions include the College, the Energy College, the Medical College, the North Caucasus Federal University College, the Economics and Law College, and others.

== Trade ==
On the territory of the city, there are and continue to be actively built shopping complexes, continue to develop existing and open new retail chains. In Nevinnomyssk, there are networks of supermarkets of companies: Krasnoe & Beloe, "Magnit", "Pyaterochka", Chizhik, "Vershina", stores of household appliances and electronics: Euroset, Svyaznoy, Pozitronika, DNS, Search, Eldorado. Delivery points of online stores, distribution centers Yandex Market, Wildberries and Ozon. Real estate agencies, sports and tourist clubs carry out their activities.

There are several markets: Skotny Market (Kalinina Street), Central Market (Gagarina Street, near NCFU).

In 2022, the Fruit Valley of Stavropolye and an apple orchard are operating in the Nevinnomyssk region.

The city has shopping malls such as Status, Vershina, Grant, Tchaikovsky, and Tsentralny Universal'nyi Magazin, as well as local newspapers and sports facilities.

== Sources ==
- Правительство Ставропольского края. Постановление №63-п от 4 мая 2006 г. «Об утверждении реестра административно-территориальных единиц Ставропольского края», в ред. Постановления №75-п от 5 марта 2015 г. «О внесении изменения в пункт 47 Раздела II Реестра административно-территориальных единиц Ставропольского края, утверждённый Постановлением Правительства Ставропольского края от 04 мая 2006 г. №63-п». Вступил в силу с 4 мая 2006 г.. Опубликован: "Сборник законов и других правовых актов Ставропольского края", №17, ст. 5609, 10 июля 2006 г. (Government of Stavropol Krai. Resolution #63-p of May 4, 2006 On the Adoption of the Registry of the Administrative-Territorial Units of Stavropol Krai, as amended by the Resolution #75-p of March 5, 2015 On Amending Item 47 of Section II of the Registry of the Administrative-Territorial Units of Stavropol Krai Adopted by Resolution #63-p of the Government of Stavropol Krai of May 4, 2006. Effective as of May 4, 2006.).
- Государственная Дума Ставропольского края. Закон №88-кз от 4 октября 2004 г. «О наделении муниципальных образований Ставропольского края статусом городского, сельского поселения, городского округа, муниципального района», в ред. Закона №51-кз от 28 мая 2015 г. «О преобразовании муниципальных образований, входящих в состав Минераловодского муниципального района Ставропольского края (Минераловодского территориального муниципального образования Ставропольского края), и об организации местного самоуправления на территории Минераловодского района Ставропольского края». Вступил в силу со дня официального опубликования. Опубликован: "Ставропольская правда", №216, 6 октября 2004 г. (State Duma of Stavropol Krai. Law #88-kz of October 4, 2004 On Granting the Status of Urban, Rural Settlement, Urban Okrug, Municipal District to the Municipal Formations of Stavropol Krai, as amended by the Law #51-kz of May 28, 2015 On the Transformation of the Municipal Formations Within Mineralovodsky Municipal District of Stavropol Krai (Mineralovodskoye Territorial Municipal Formation of Stavropol Krai), and on the Organization of the Local Self-Government on the Territory of Mineralovodsky District of Stavropol Krai. Effective as of the day of the official publication.).
