= Victoria Sokolyuk =

Russian politician

Victoria Eduardovna Sokolyuk

Acting mayor city Nevinnomyssk
- Incumbent
- Assumed office 29 May 2026
- President: Vladimir Putin
- Preceded by: Michaul Minenkov
- Governor: Vladimir Vladimirov

First deputy mayor city of Nevinnomyssk
- In office 16 November 2016 – 29 May 2026
- Mayor: Michaul Minenkov
- Preceded by: Michaul Minenkov

First deputy mayor of city Mikhailovsk
- In office 20 june 2014 – 20 October 2016
- Governor of the region: Vladimir Vladimirov
- Mayor: Michaul Minenkov

Personal details
- Born: 24 February 1972 (age 54) Stavropol, Stavropol Kray, RSFSR, USSR
- Education: Stavropol Polytechnic Institute; North Caucasus Academy of Public Administration
- Profession: engineer, manager

Victoria Eduardovna Sokolyuk (born 24 February 1972, Stavropol, Stavropol Kray, RSFSR, USSR) Russian statesman and politician. Acting mayor city Nevinnomyssk from 29 May 2026.

First deputy mayor city of Nevinnomyssk (2016–2026). First deputy mayor of city Mikhailovsk (2014–2016).

== Biography ==
Victoria Sokolyuk was born on February 24, 1972 in the city of Stavropol, Stavropol Kray.

In 1994, she graduated from Stavropol Polytechnic Institute with a degree in «Electric Power Systems and Networks».

In 2008, she completed retraining at the North Caucasus Academy of Public Administration under the program «State and Municipal Administration».

She started her career in 1994 as a category 1 engineer in the city of Stavropol.

From 1995 to 1997, Victoria Sokolyuk worked then in commercial companies.

After that, in May 1999, she joined vodokanal city of Stavropol, from where she quit six months later to get a job at an auto center selling trucks and special equipment.

From 2003 to 2005, she worked at the Stavropol land chamber.

In May 2005, she joined the municipal service of the city planning committee of the capital administration city Stavropol.

In July 2013, she became a consultant in the administration city Stavropol.

From April to May 2014, she completed her state civil service in the Ministry of health Stavropol Kray.

Her next job was the administration of Mikhailovsk, where she was the business manager from 2014 to 2016, and then the first deputy mayor of Mikhailovsk Mikhaul Minenkov.

In October 2016, she took up the post of leading specialist of the committee for conducting competitive procedures of the Nevinnomyssk administration.

On November 16, 2016, Victoria Sokolyuk was appointed First Deputy Mayor of Nevinnomyssk Michaul Minenkov.

On May 29, 2026, she became acting mayor of Nevinnomyssk, due to the early resignation of mayor Minenkov, who had led the municipality for 10 years.
