= Mikhaylovsky =

Mikhaylovsky (masculine), Mikhaylovskaya (feminine), or Mikhaylovskoye (neuter) may refer to:

People

- Mikhaylovsky (last name), last name of Slavic origin (includes a list)

Places

- Mikhaylovsky District, several districts in Russia
- Mikhaylovskoye Urban Settlement, several municipal urban settlements in Russia
- Mikhaylovsky, Russia (Mikhaylovskoye, Mikhaylovskaya), several rural localities in Russia
- Mikhaylovskoye, Azerbaijan, a village in Salyan District, Azerbaijan

== Other ==
- Mikhailovsky Theatre, an opera and ballet house in St. Petersburg, Russia
- Mikhailovsky Palace, several palaces in St. Petersburg, Russia
- Mikhaylovskoye Airport, alternative name of the Stavropol Shpakovskoye Airport in Russia
- Mikhaylovskoye Museum Reserve, a museum complex in Pskov Oblast, Russia, dedicated to Alexander Pushkin

== See also ==
- Michael (disambiguation)
- Mikhaylov (disambiguation)
- Mikhaylovsk
- Mikhaylovka (disambiguation)
