= Mykhailivka =

Mykhailivka stands for a historical Mykhailivka culture of c. 3600 BCE. Place-name in Ukrainian: Михайлівка may refer to several places in Ukraine:

== Cherkasy Oblast ==
- Mykhailivka, Kaniv urban hromada, Cherkasy Raion, Cherkasy Oblast
- Mykhailivka, Mykhailivka rural hromada, Cherkasy Raion, Cherkasy Oblast
- Mykhailivka, Chornobai settlement hromada, Zolotonosha Raion, Cherkasy Oblast
- Mykhailivka, Drabiv settlement hromada, Zolotonosha Raion, Cherkasy Oblast
- Mykhailivka, Vodianyky rural hromada, Zvenyhorodka Raion, Cherkasy Oblast
- Mykhailivka, Zvenyhorodka urban hromada, Zvenyhorodka Raion, Cherkasy Oblast

== Chernihiv Oblast ==
- Mykhailivka, Koriukivka Raion, Chernihiv Oblast
- Mykhailivka, Novhorod-Siverskyi Raion, Chernihiv Oblast

== Chernivtsi Oblast ==
- Mykhailivka, Chernivtsi Raion, Chernivtsi Oblast
- Mykhailivka, Dniester Raion, Chernivtsi Oblast

== Crimea ==
- Mykhailivka, Nyzhniohirskyi Raion, Crimea
- Mykhailivka, Saky Raion, Crimea

== Dnipropetrovsk Oblast ==
- Mykhailivka, Dnipro Raion, Dnipropetrovsk Oblast
- Mykhailivka, Lykhivka settlement hromada, Kamianske Raion, Dnipropetrovsk Oblast
- Mykhailivka, Zatyshne rural hromada, Kamianske Raion, Dnipropetrovsk Oblast
- Mykhailivka, Apostolove urban hromada, Kryvyi Rih, Dnipropetrovsk Oblast
- Mykhailivka, Sofiivka settlement hromada, Kryvyi Rih, Dnipropetrovsk Oblast
- Mykhailivka, Nikopol Raion, Dnipropetrovsk Oblast
- Mykhailivka, Novomoskovsk Raion, Dnipropetrovsk Oblast
- Mykhailivka, Synelnykove Raion, Dnipropetrovsk Oblast

== Donetsk Oblast ==
- Mykhailivka, Donetsk Raion, Donetsk Oblast
- Mykhailivka, Horlivka urban hromada, Horlivka Raion, Donetsk Oblast
- Mykhailivka, Khrestivka urban hromada, Horlivka Raion, Donetsk Oblast
- Mykhailivka, Kalmiuske Raion, Donetsk Oblast
- Mykhailivka, Kramatorsk Raion, Donetsk Oblast
- Mykhailivka, Hrodivka settlement hromada, Pokrovsk Raion, Donetsk Oblast
- Mykhailivka, Novohrodivka urban hromada, Pokrovsk Raion, Donetsk Oblast

== Kharkiv Oblast ==
- Mykhailivka, Krasnokutsk settlement hromada, Bohodukhiv Raion, Kharkiv Oblast
- Mykhailivka, Valky urban hromada, Bohodukhiv Raion, Kharkiv Oblast
- Mykhailivka, Chuhuiv Raion, Kharkiv Oblast
- Mykhailivka, Kharkiv Raion, Kharkiv Oblast
- Mykhailivka (Nyzhnii Burluk), Shevchenko settlement hromada, Kupiansk Raion, Kharkiv Oblast
- Mykhailivka (Shevchenko), Shevchenko settlement hromada, Kupiansk Raion, Kharkiv Oblast
- Mykhailivka, Velykyi Burluk settlement hromada, Kupiansk Raion, Kharkiv Oblast
- Mykhailivka, Lozova urban hromada, Lozova Raion, Kharkiv Oblast
- Mykhailivka, Oleksiivka rural hromada, Lozova Raion, Kharkiv Oblast

== Kherson Oblast ==
- Mykhailivka, Beryslav Raion, Kherson Oblast
- Mykhailivka, Henichesk Raion, Kherson Oblast
- Mykhailivka, Kakhovka Raion, Kherson Oblast
- Mykhailivka, Skadovsk Raion, Kherson Oblast

== Khmelnytskyi Oblast ==
- Mykhailivka, Makiv rural hromada, Kamianets-Podilskyi Raion
- Mykhailivka, Chemerivtsi settlement hromada, Kamianets-Podilskyi Raion
- Mykhailivka, Pluzhne rural hromada, Shepetivka Raion
- Mykhailivka, Berezdiv rural hromada, Shepetivka Raion
- Mykhailivka, Rozsosha rural hromada, Khmelnytskyi Raion

== Kirovohrad Oblast ==
- Mykhailivka, Kropyvnytskyi Raion, Kirovohrad Oblast
- Mykhailivka, Hlodosy rural hromada, Novoukrainka Raion, Kirovohrad Oblast
- Mykhailivka, Dobrovelychkivka settlement hromada, Novoukrainka Raion, Kirovohrad Oblast
- Mykhailivka, Oleksandriia Raion, Kirovohrad Oblast

== Kyiv Oblast ==
- Mykhailivka, Tetiiv urban hromada, Bila Tserkva Raion, Kyiv Oblast
- Mykhailivka, Uzyn urban hromada, Bila Tserkva Raion, Kyiv Oblast
- Mykhailivka, Volodarka settlement hromada, Bila Tserkva Raion, Kyiv Oblast
- Mykhailivka, Brovary Raion, Kyiv Oblast
- Mykhailivka, Obukhiv Raion, Kyiv Oblast

== Luhansk Oblast ==
- Mykhailivka, Alchevsk Raion, Luhansk Oblast
- Mykhailivka, Kreminna Raion, Luhansk Oblast
- Mykhailivka, Novoaidar Raion, Luhansk Oblast
- Mykhailivka, Rovenky Raion, Luhansk Oblast
- Mykhailivka, Stanytsia-Luhanska Raion, Luhansk Oblast
- Mykhailivka, Svatove Raion, Luhansk Oblast

== Lviv Oblast ==
- Mykhailivka, Lviv Oblast

== Mykolaiv Oblast ==
- Mykhailivka, Bashtanka rural hromada, Bashtanka Raion, Mykolaiv Oblast
- Mykhailivka, Kazanka settlement hromada, Bashtanka Raion, Mykolaiv Oblast
- Mykhailivka, Snihurivka urban hromada, Bashtanka Raion, Mykolaiv Oblast
- Mykhailivka, Berezanka settlement hromada, Mykolaiv Raion, Mykolaiv Oblast
- Mykhailivka, Mykolaiv urban hromada, Mykolaiv Raion, Mykolaiv Oblast
- Mykhailivka, Nova Odesa urban hromada, Mykolaiv Raion, Mykolaiv Oblast
- Mykhailivka, Ochakiv urban hromada, Mykolaiv Raion, Mykolaiv Oblast
- Mykhailivka, Pervomaisk Raion, Mykolaiv Oblast
- Mykhailivka, Bratske settlement hromada, Voznesensk Raion, Mykolaiv Oblast
- Mykhailivka, Veselynove settlement hromada, Voznesensk Raion, Mykolaiv Oblast
- Mykhailivka, Yelanets settlement hromada, Voznesensk Raion, Mykolaiv Oblast

== Odesa Oblast ==
- Mykhailivka, Berezivka Raion, Odesa Oblast
- Mykhailivka, Bilhorod-Dnistrovskyi Raion, Odesa Oblast
- Mykhailivka, Odesa Raion, Odesa Oblast
- Mykhailivka, Ananiv urban hromada, Podilsk Raion, Odesa Oblast
- Mykhailivka, Liubashivka settlement hromada, Podilsk Raion, Odesa Oblast

== Poltava Oblast ==
- Mykhailivka, Lubny Raion, Poltava Oblast
- Mykhailivka, Myrhorod Raion, Poltava Oblast
- Mykhailivka, Dykanka settlement hromada, Poltava Raion, Odesa Oblast
- Mykhailivka, Mykhailivka rural hromada, Poltava Raion, Odesa Oblast
- Mykhailivka, Zinkiv urban hromada, Poltava Raion, Odesa Oblast

== Rivne Oblast ==
- Mykhailivka, Dubno Raion, Rivne Oblast
- Mykhailivka, Ostroh urban hromada, Rivne Raion, Rivne Oblast
- Mykhailivka, Rivne urban hromada, Rivne Raion, Rivne Oblast

== Sumy Oblast ==
- Mykhailivka, Konotop Raion, Sumy Oblast
- Mykhailivka, Krasnopillia settlement hromada, Sumy Raion, Sumy Oblast
- Mykhailivka, Lebedyn urban hromada, Sumy Raion, Sumy Oblast

== Ternopil Oblast ==
- Mykhailivka, Chortkiv Raion, Ternopil Oblast
- Mykhailivka, Kremenets Raion, Ternopil Oblast
- Mykhailivka, Ternopil Raion, Ternopil Oblast

== Vinnytsia Oblast ==
- Mykhailivka, Bershad urban hromada, Haisyn Raion, Vinnytsia Oblast
- Mykhailivka, Haisyn urban hromada, Haisyn Raion, Vinnytsia Oblast
- Mykhailivka, Mohyliv-Podilskyi Raion, Vinnytsia Oblast
- Mykhailivka, Tulchyn Raion, Vinnytsia Oblast
- Mykhailivka, Vinnytsia Raion, Vinnytsia Oblast
- Mykhailivka, Zhmerynka Raion, Vinnytsia Oblast

== Volyn Oblast ==
- Mykhailivka, Lutsk Raion, Volyn Oblast
- Mykhailivka, Volodymyr-Volynskyi Raion, Volyn Oblast

== Zaporizhia Oblast ==
- Mykhailivka, Vasylivka Raion, Zaporizhzhia Oblast
- Mykhailivka, Zaporizhzhia Raion, Zaporizhzhia Oblast

== Zhytomyr Oblast ==
- Mykhailivka, Olevsk urban hromada, Korosten Raion, Zhytomyr Oblast
- Mykhailivka, Zviahel Raion, Zhytomyr Oblast
- Mykhailivka, Khoroshiv settlement hromada, Zhytomyr Raion, Zhytomyr Oblast
- Mykhailivka, Korosten urban hromada, Zhytomyr Raion, Zhytomyr Oblast
- Mykhailivka, Liubar settlement hromada, Zhytomyr Raion, Zhytomyr Oblast
- Mykhailivka, Teterivka rural hromada, Zhytomyr Raion, Zhytomyr Oblast

== See also ==
- Velyka Mykhailivka, rural settlement in Odesa Oblast
- Mikhaylovka
