= Mikhaylov (inhabited locality) =

Set index of articles associated with the same name

Mikhaylov (Russian: Михайлов) is the name of several inhabited localities in Russia.

Urban localities

- Mikhaylov, Ryazan Oblast, a town in Mikhaylovsky District of Ryazan Oblast; administratively incorporated as a town of district significance

Rural localities

- Mikhaylov, Republic of Adygea, a khutor in Shovgenovsky District of the Republic of Adygea
- Mikhaylov, Krasnodar Krai, a khutor in Bezvodny Rural Okrug of Kurganinsky District of Krasnodar Krai
- Mikhaylov, Rostov Oblast, a khutor in Mikhaylovskoye Rural Settlement of Tatsinsky District of Rostov Oblast
- Mikhaylov, Voronezh Oblast, a settlement in Pervomayskoye Rural Settlement of Ertilsky District of Voronezh Oblast
