= Mikhaylovsk =

Mikhaylovsk (Russian: Михайловск) is the name of several inhabited localities in Russia.

== Urban localities ==
- Mikhaylovsk, Stavropol Krai, a town in Shpakovsky District of Stavropol Krai
- Mikhaylovsk, Sverdlovsk Oblast, a town in Nizhneserginsky District of Sverdlovsk Oblast

== Rural localities ==
- Mikhaylovsk, Pochepsky District, Bryansk Oblast, a settlement in Baklansky Rural Administrative Okrug of Pochepsky District of Bryansk Oblast
- Mikhaylovsk, Starodubsky District, Bryansk Oblast, a selo in Gartsevsky Rural Administrative Okrug of Starodubsky District of Bryansk Oblast
- Mikhaylovsk, Udmurt Republic, a village in Ildibayevsky Selsoviet of Kiyasovsky District of the Udmurt Republic

== See also ==
- Michael (disambiguation)
- Mikhaylov (disambiguation)
- Mikhaylovsky (disambiguation)
- Mikhaylovka (disambiguation)
