= Mikhaylov =

Mikhaylov (masculine) or Mikhaylova (feminine) may refer to:

== Places ==
- Mikhaylov (inhabited locality), name of several inhabited localities in Russia
- Mikhaylov Island, an island in the West Ice Shelf in Antarctica
- Knez Mihailova, the main pedestrian street in Belgrade
- Mikhailov Peninsula, a small peninsula on the western coast of the Taymyr Peninsula, Russia

== Other uses ==
- Mikhaylov (surname)
- 1910 Mikhailov, an asteroid discovered by Lyudmila Zhuravlyova in 1972
- Mikhailov case, a 2010s espionage scandal in Russia

== See also ==
- Michael (disambiguation)
- Mikhaylovsk
- Mikhaylovsky (disambiguation)
- Mikhaylovka (disambiguation)
