= Mikhail (disambiguation) =

Mikhail is a given name.

Mikhail may also refer to:

- List of people with given name Mikhail
- Mikhail of Vladimir (died in 1176), Grand Prince of Kyiv and of Vladimir
- Mikhail of Chernigov (c. 1185–1246), grand prince of Kiev and prince of several Rus principalities
- Mikhail of Tver (1271–1318), Grand Prince of Vladimir
- Mikhail II of Tver (1333–1399), Grand Prince of Tver and of Vladimir
- Mikhail III of Tver (1453–1505), last prince of Tver
- Mikhail of Russia (Mikhail I Fyodorovich Romanov) (1596–1645)
- Mikhail, Prince of Abkhazia (died 1866), the head of state of the Principality of Abkhazia
- Mikhail Gorbachev (1931–2022), Soviet and Russian politician

== See also ==
- Mikheil Meskhi Stadium, multi-purpose stadium in Tbilisi, Georgia
- Michael (disambiguation)
