= Michaels (disambiguation) =

Michaels is the largest arts and crafts retail chain in the United States. It is part of The Michaels Companies.

Michaels may also refer to:

- Michaels (surname)
- Michaels, California, USA; the former name of Coarsegold, California
- Michaels Park (Edmonton), Alberta, Canada
- Michael’s Pub, a New York jazz venue
- Associated with contract bridge game:
  - Leaping Michaels
  - Michaels cuebid

== See also ==
- The Michaels Companies, holding company for arts and crafts store chain Michaels
- Michael (disambiguation)
- Saint Michael (disambiguation)
