= Chizhik =

Chizhik may refer to:

- Chizhik-Pyzhik
- Dmitry Chizhik, American engineer
- Leonid Chizhik, Soviet musician
- A food retailer in Russia owned by the X5 Group
