= Bolshoy Zelenchuk =

River in the North Caucasus, Russia

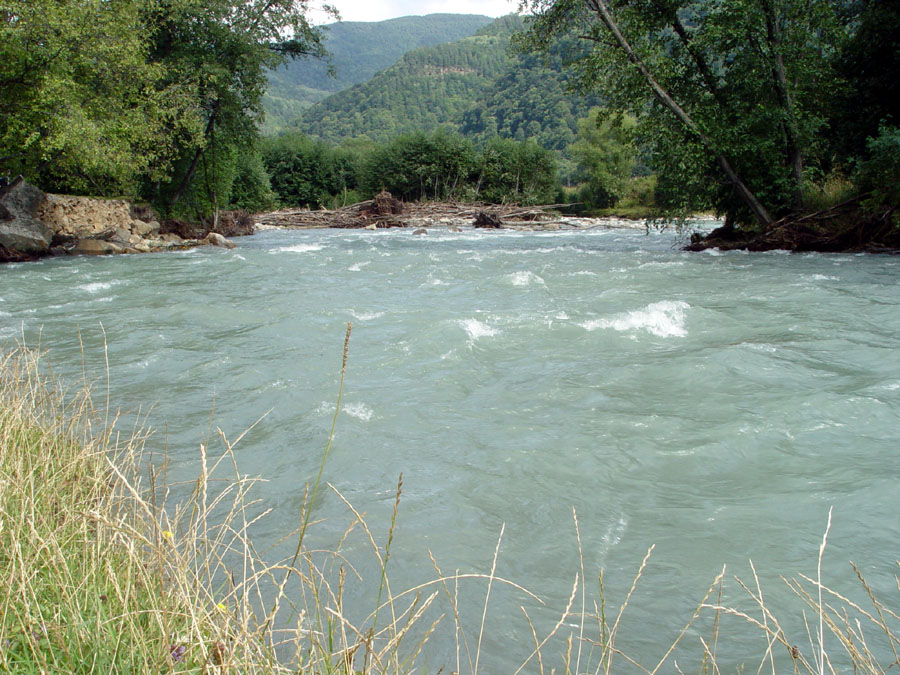

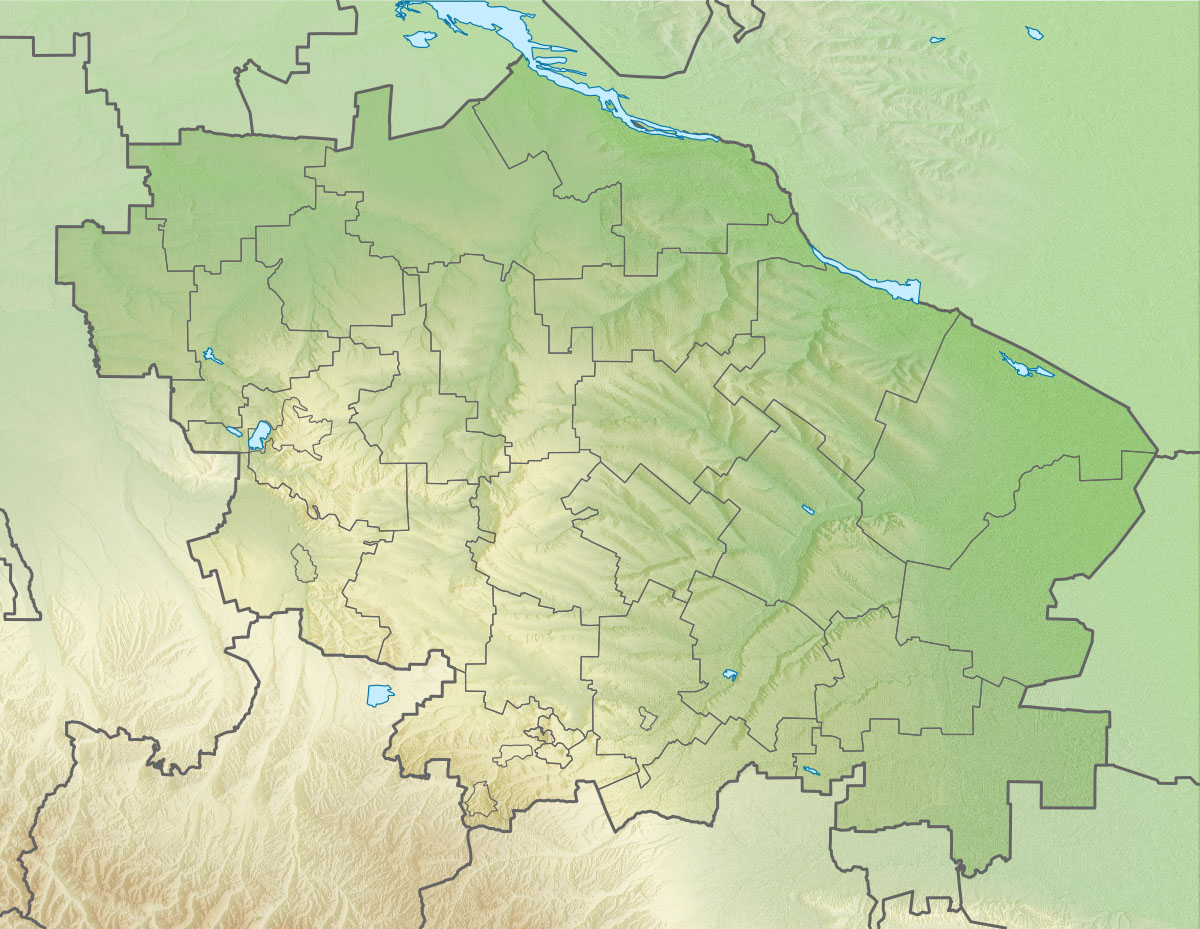
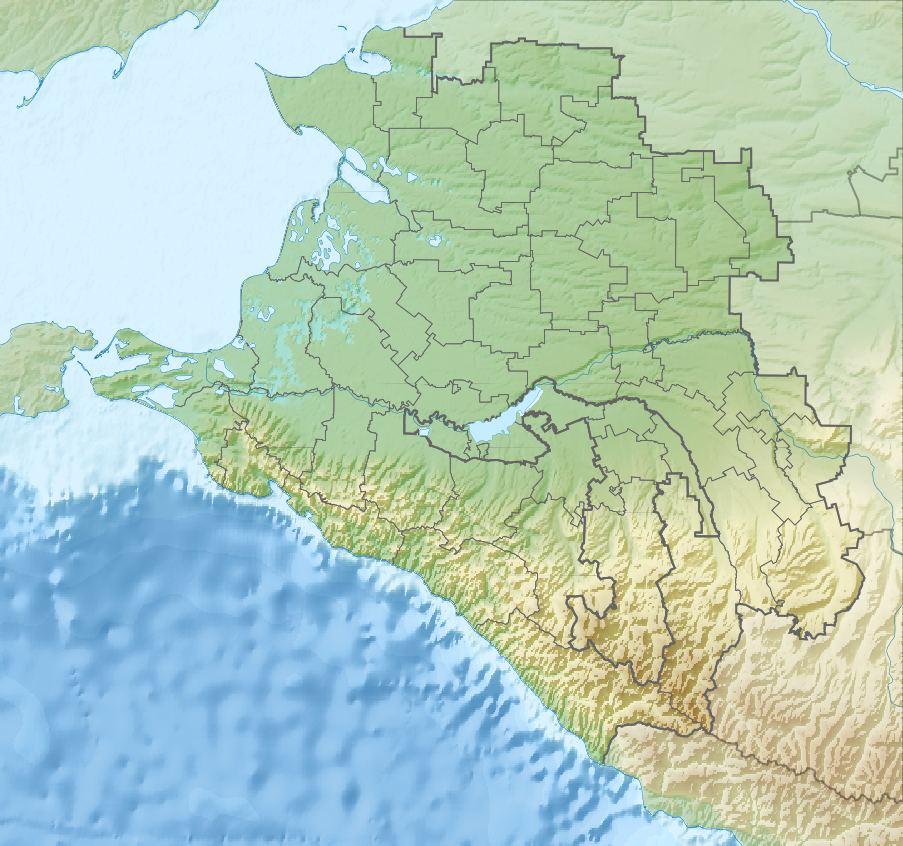
- Location within Stavropol Krai Location within Krasnodar Krai Location within Caucasus Mountains Location within European Russia

Physical characteristics
- Mouth: Kuban
  - coordinates: 44.6269°N 41.9336°E
- Length: 158 km (98 mi)
- Basin size: 2,730 km^{2} (1,050 sq mi)

Basin features
- Progression: Kuban→ Sea of Azov

The Bolshoy Zelenchuk (Russian: Большой Зеленчук, Abaza: Йынджьыгь-Ду, Adyghe: Инжыджышхуэ, Karachay-Balkar: Уллу Инджик, romanized: Ullu İncik, Nogai: Уьйкен Йилиншик, romanized: Üyken Yilinşik) is a river in the North Caucasus, Russia. It is a left tributary of the Kuban into which it flows at Nevinnomyssk. It is 158 kilometres (98 mi) long, and has a drainage basin of 2,730 square kilometres (1,050 sq mi). The river is where the Zelenchuk inscription was found, which is considered the most famous written inscription for the Alanic language.
