= Michael (ship) =

Michael is the name of several ships.

- Great Michael, also called Michael, a 16th-century carrack great ship of the Kingdom of Scotland, launched 1511
- Michael, a 15th century Scottish ship captured by the English and becoming part of the English Navy in 1488
- SS Michael, a Greek cargo ship in service from 1959
- SS Michael E, a CAM Ship sunk on her maiden voyage in 1941

== See also ==
- Ma'agan Michael Ship, a 5th century BCE ship discovered off the coast of Kibbutz Ma'agan Michael, Israel
