= Mikhaylovskoye, Azerbaijan =

Mikhaylovskoye
- Location within Azerbaijan
- Coordinates: 39°50′N 48°50′E
- Country: Azerbaijan
- Rayon: Salyan
- Time zone: UTC+4 (AZT)
  - Summer (DST): UTC+5 (AZT)

Mikhaylovskoye is a village in the Salyan Rayon of Azerbaijan.
