= Pronya =

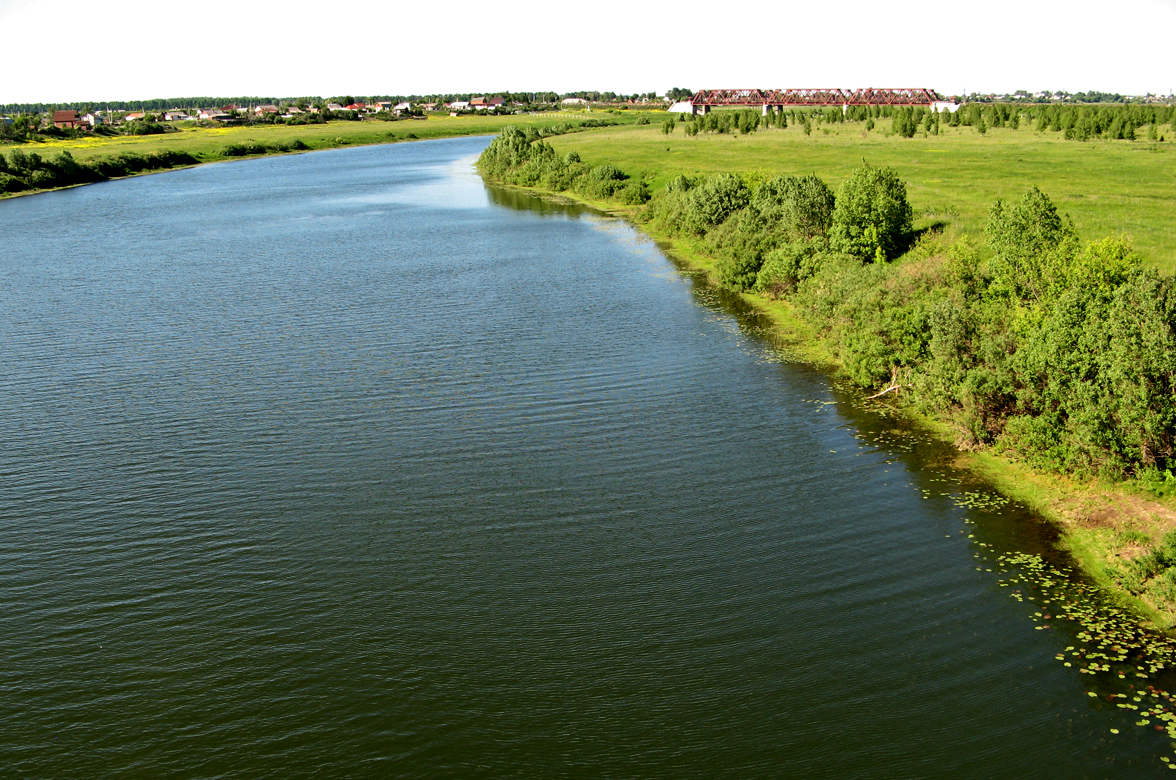
- Native name: Проня (Russian)

Location
- Country: Russia

Physical characteristics
- Mouth: Oka
  - coordinates: 54.3517°N 40.3967°E
- Length: 336 km (209 mi)
- Basin size: 10,200 km^{2} (3,900 sq mi)

Basin features
- Progression: Oka→ Volga→ Caspian Sea

The Pronya (Russian: Проня) is a river in the Ryazan and Tula oblasts in Russia. It is a right tributary of the Oka. The length of the river is 336 kilometres (209 mi). The area of its basin is 10,200 square kilometres (3,900 sq mi). The river freezes up in late November and stays icebound until early March. The Pronya is navigable in its lower reaches. The town of Mikhaylov is located on the Pronya.
