= Mixaylovka =

- Municipality
- Location within Azerbaijan
- Coordinates: 40°28′19″N 46°21′57″E
- Country: Azerbaijan
- Rayon: Goygol

Population
  - Total: 146
- Time zone: UTC+4 (AZT)
  - Summer (DST): UTC+5 (AZT)

Mixaylovka is a village and the least populous municipality in the Goygol Rayon of Azerbaijan. It has a population of 146.
