= Dmitry Chizhik =

American electrical engineer

Dmitry Chizhik is an electrical engineer at Bell Labs in Holmdel, New Jersey. Chizhik was named a Fellow of the Institute of Electrical and Electronics Engineers (IEEE) in 2014 for contributions to wireless channel modeling.

Born in Kyiv, Ukraine, Chizhik immigrated to America in the late seventies with both his parents. He now lives in New Jersey with his wife and four daughters.

== Education ==
- Ph.D. in electrophysics. Minor: physics, NYU Polytechnic Institute
- M.S. in electrical engineering, NYU Polytechnic Institute
- B.S. in electrical engineering, NYU Polytechnic Institute
