= Mikhaylov, Ryazan Oblast =

Town in Ryazan Oblast, Russia

Mikhaylov Михайлов
- Town

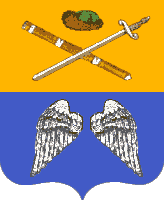
- Coat of arms
- Interactive map of Mikhaylov
- Location of Mikhaylov Mikhaylov (Europe) Mikhaylov (Russia)
- Coordinates: 54°14′N 39°02′E
- Country: Russia
- Federal subject: Ryazan Oblast
- Administrative district: Mikhaylovsky District
- Town of district significanceSelsoviet: Mikhaylov
- Founded: 1551
- Elevation: 130 m (430 ft)

Population (2010 Census)
  - Total: 11,784
  - Estimate (2025): 9,618 (−18.4%)

Administrative status
  - Capital of: Mikhaylovsky District, town of district significance of Mikhaylov

Municipal status
  - Municipal district: Mikhaylovsky Municipal District
  - Urban settlement: Mikhaylovskoye Urban Settlement
  - Capital of: Mikhaylovsky Municipal District, Mikhaylovskoye Urban Settlement
- Time zone: UTC+3 (MSK)
- Postal codes: 391710–391712, 391739
- OKTMO ID: 61617101001

Mikhaylov (Russian: Миха́йлов) is a town and the administrative center of Mikhaylovsky District in Ryazan Oblast, Russia, located on the Pronya River (Oka's tributary), 68 kilometers (42 mi) southwest of Ryazan, the administrative center of the oblast. Population: 11,784 (2010 census); 13,295 (2002 census); 15,302 (1989 Soviet census).

== History ==
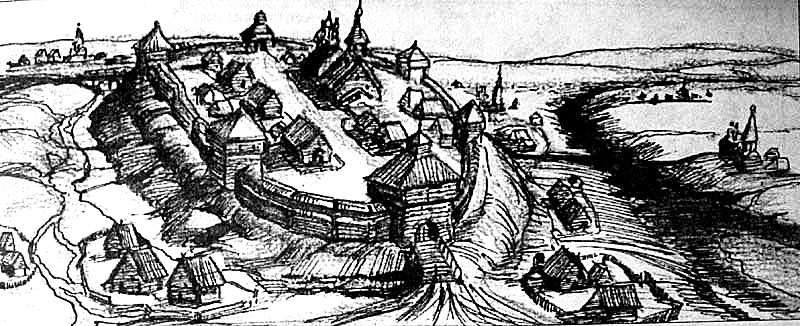
Reconstruction of the fortress in Mikhailov in the 16th century

It was founded in 1551 during the reign of Ivan IV of Russia, although some historians believe that it was founded as early as 1137 under Rurik Rostislavich. It was inhabited by the streltsy, cannonmakers, and carpenters, who formed slobodas around the town. In 1618, Mikhaylov withstood a ten-day siege by the Polish army. In 1708, the town became a part of Moscow Governorate and then of Ryazan Viceroyalty and Ryazan Governorate.

== Administrative and municipal status ==
Within the framework of administrative divisions, Mikhaylov serves as the administrative center of Mikhaylovsky District. As an administrative division, it is, together with six rural localities, incorporated within Mikhaylovsky District as the town of district significance of Mikhaylov. As a municipal division, the town of district significance of Mikhaylov is incorporated within Mikhaylovsky Municipal District as Mikhaylovskoye Urban Settlement.
