= Mykhailivka, Chernivtsi Raion, Chernivtsi Oblast =

Village in Chernivtsi Oblast, Ukraine

Mykhaylivka (Ukrainian: Михайлівка; Romanian: Mihuceni; German: Mihuczeny) is a village in Chernivtsi Raion, Chernivtsi Oblast, Ukraine. It belongs to Hlyboka settlement hromada, one of the hromadas of Ukraine.

Until 18 July 2020, Mikhaylivka belonged to Hlyboka Raion. The raion was abolished in July 2020 as part of the administrative reform of Ukraine, which reduced the number of raions of Chernivtsi Oblast to three. The area of Hlyboka Raion was merged into Chernivtsi Raion.
