= Shpakovsky District =

Shpakovsky District Шпаковский район (Russian)
- District
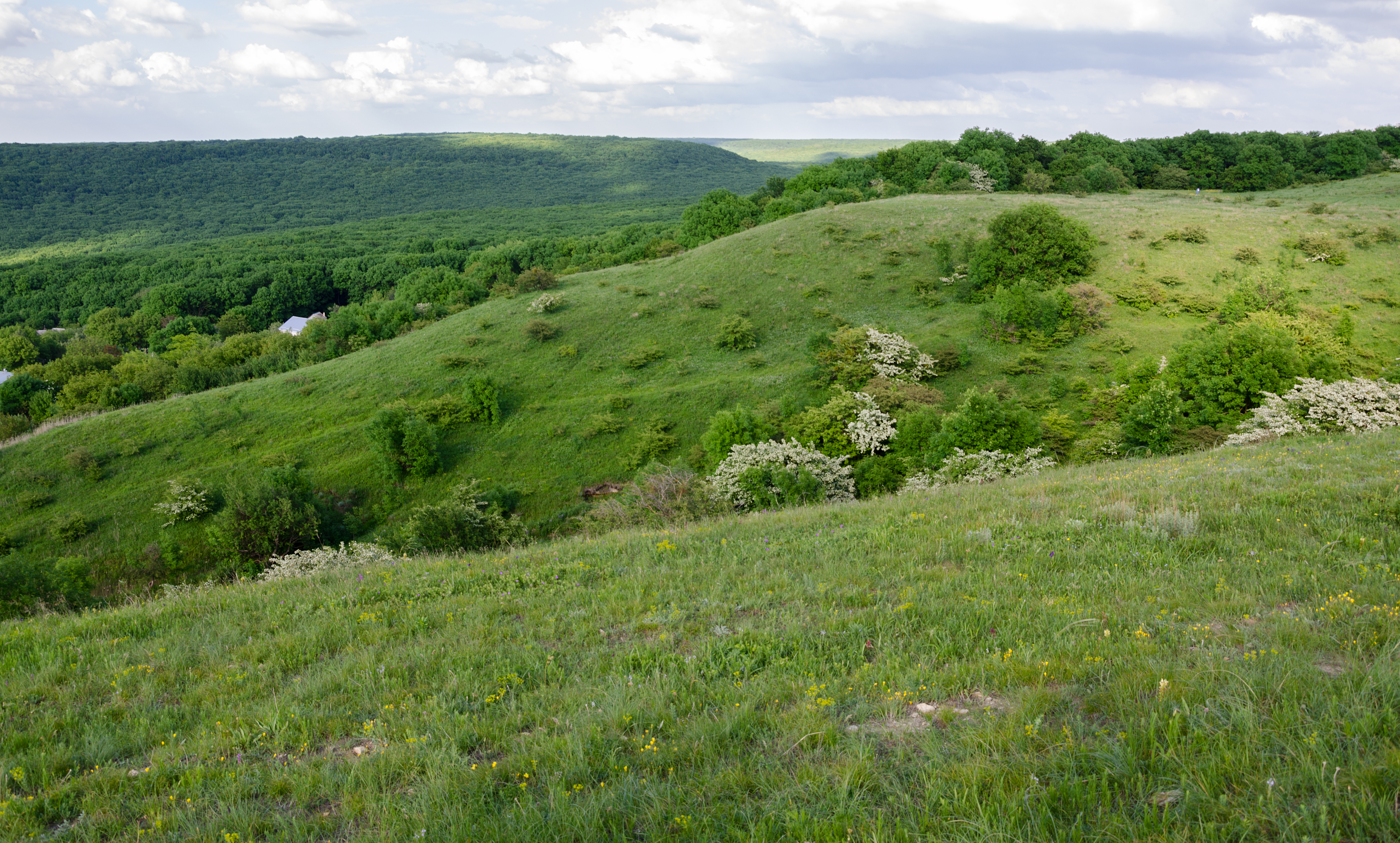
- Besputskaya Glade, Shpakovsky District

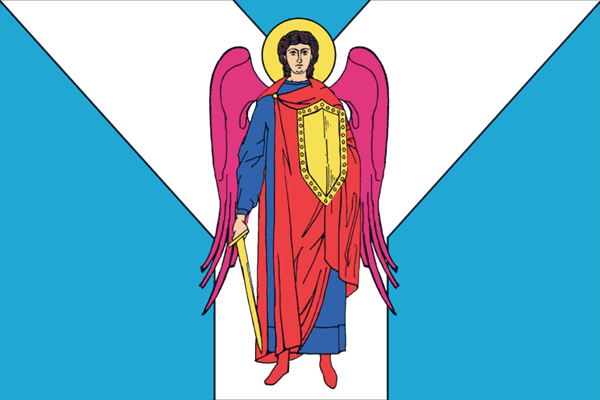
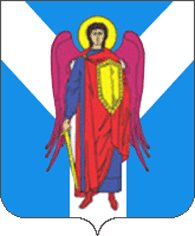
- Flag Coat of arms
- Location of Shpakovsky District in Stavropol Krai
- Coordinates: 45°08′N 42°02′E
- Country: Russia
- Federal subject: Stavropol Krai
- Established: 23 January 1935
- Administrative center: Mikhaylovsk

Area
  - Total: 2,363 km^{2} (912 sq mi)

Population (2010 Census)
  - Total: 123,071
  - Density: 52.08/km^{2} (134.9/sq mi)
  - Urban: 57.7%
  - Rural: 42.3%

Administrative structure
  - Administrative divisions: 1 Towns, 10 Selsoviets
  - Inhabited localities: 1 cities/towns, 41 rural localities

Municipal structure
  - Municipally incorporated as: Shpakovsky Municipal District
  - Municipal divisions: 1 urban settlements, 11 rural settlements
- Time zone: UTC+3 (MSK)
- OKTMO ID: 07558000
- Website: http://www.shmr.ru

Shpakovsky District (Russian: Шпа́ковский райо́н) is an administrative district (raion), one of the twenty-six in Stavropol Krai, Russia. Municipally, it is incorporated as Shpakovsky Municipal District. It is located in the west of the krai. The area of the district is 2,363 square kilometers (912 sq mi). Its administrative center is the town of Mikhaylovsk. Population: 123,071 (2010 census); 108,717 (2002 Census); 84,561 (1989 Census). The population of Mikhaylovsk accounts for 57.7% of the district's total population.
