= Mikhaylovsky District, Ryazan Oblast =

District in Ryazan Oblast, Russia

Mikhaylovsky District Михайловский район (Russian)
- District
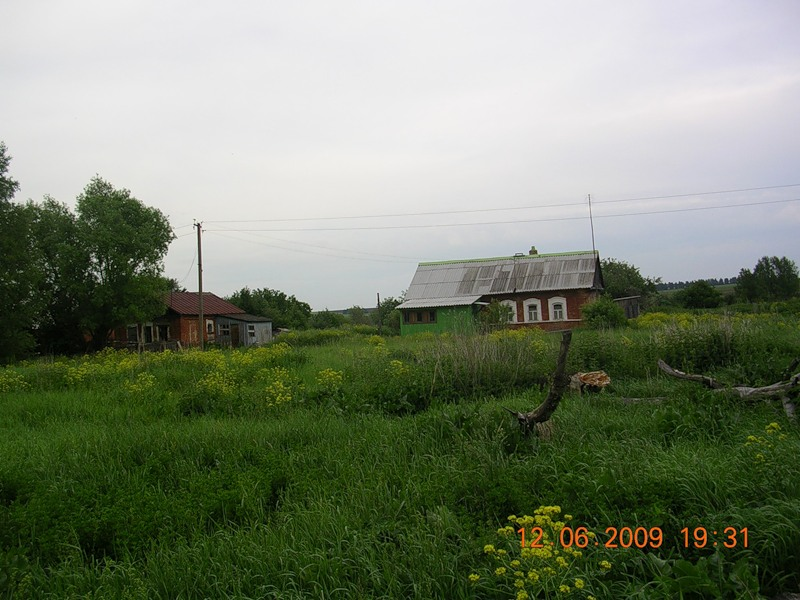
- Village in Mikhaylovsky District

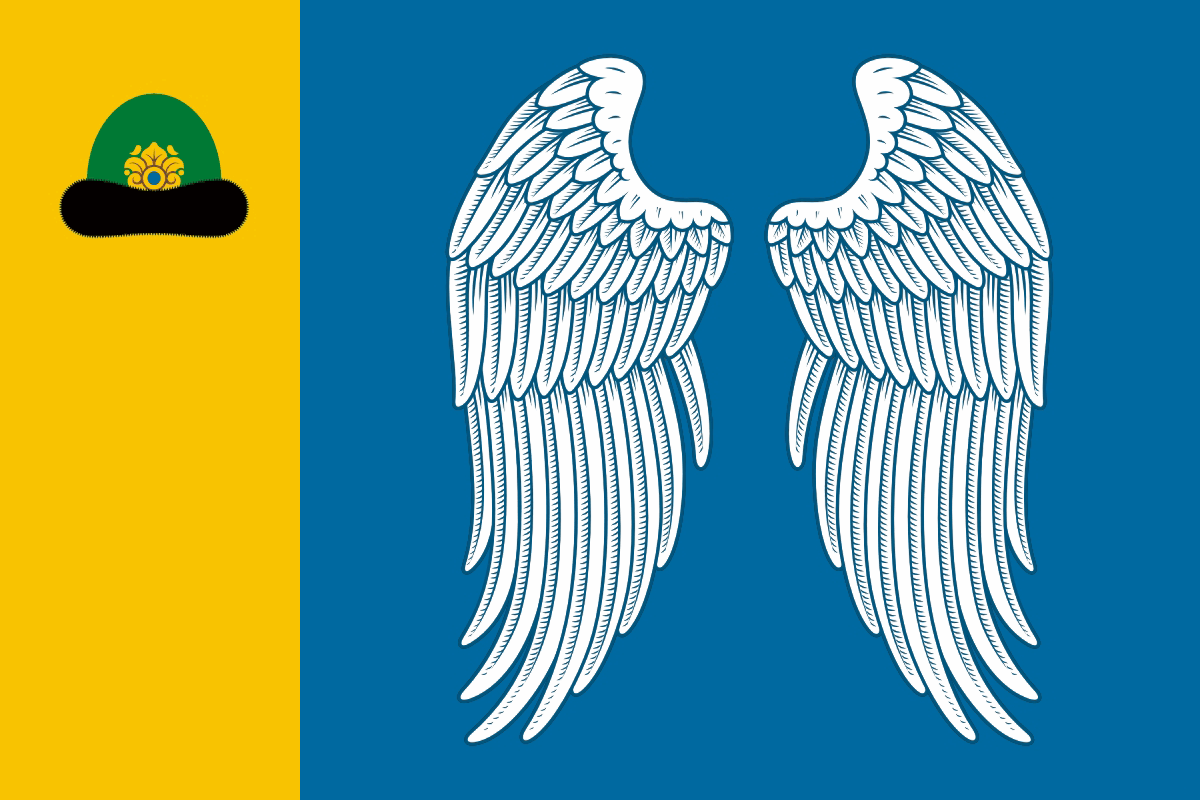
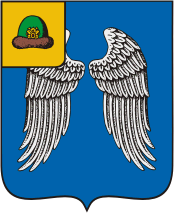
- Flag Coat of arms
- Location of Mikhaylovsky District in Ryazan Oblast
- Coordinates: 54°14′N 39°02′E
- Country: Russia
- Federal subject: Ryazan Oblast
- Established: 12 July 1929
- Administrative center: Mikhaylov

Area
  - Total: 1,841 km^{2} (711 sq mi)

Population (2010 Census)
  - Total: 35,223
  - Density: 19.13/km^{2} (49.55/sq mi)
  - Urban: 50.7%
  - Rural: 49.3%

Administrative structure
  - Administrative divisions: 1 Towns of district significance, 1 Work settlements, 24 Rural okrugs
  - Inhabited localities: 1 cities/towns, 1 urban-type settlements, 168 rural localities

Municipal structure
  - Municipally incorporated as: Mikhaylovsky Municipal District
  - Municipal divisions: 2 urban settlements, 17 rural settlements
- Time zone: UTC+3 (MSK)
- OKTMO ID: 61617000
- Website: http://mihrayadm.ru/

Mikhaylovsky District (Russian: Миха́йловский райо́н) is an administrative and municipal district (raion), one of the twenty-five in Ryazan Oblast, Russia. It is located in the west of the oblast. The area of the district is 1,841 square kilometers (711 sq mi). Its administrative center is the town of Mikhaylov. Population: 35,223 (2010 Census); 38,377 (2002 census); 45,144 (1989 Soviet census). The population of Mikhaylov accounts for 33.5% of the district's total population.
