= Michael =

Michael may refer to:

== People ==
- Michael (given name)
- Michael (surname), including a list of people with the surname Michael

=== Mononymously known as ===
- Michael (bishop elect), English 13th-century Bishop of Hereford elect
- Michael (Khoroshy) (1885–1977), cleric of the Ukrainian Orthodox Church of Canada
- Michael Donnellan (fashion designer) (1915–1985), Irish-born London fashion designer, often referred to simply as "Michael"
- Michael (footballer, born 1982), Brazilian footballer
- Michael (footballer, born 1983), Brazilian footballer
- Michael (footballer, born 1993), Brazilian footballer
- Michael (footballer, born February 1996), Brazilian footballer
- Michael (footballer, born March 1996), Brazilian footballer
- Michael (footballer, born 1999), Brazilian footballer

=== Rulers ===
==== Byzantine emperors ====
- Michael I Rangabe (d. 844), married the daughter of Emperor Nikephoros I
- Michael II (770–829), called "the Stammerer" and "the Amorian"
- Michael III (840–867), called "the Drunkard", youngest child of Theophilos
- Michael IV the Paphlagonian (1010–1041), husband of Zoë, came from a peasant family
- Michael V Kalaphates (1015–1042), or "the Caulker", nephew of Michael IV
- Michael VI Bringas (d. 1059), called "Stratiotikos", chosen by Theodora
- Michael VII Doukas (c. 1050–1078), called "Parapinakes", eldest son of Constantine X
- Michael VIII Palaiologos (1223–1282), founder of the Palaeologan dynasty
- Michael IX Palaiologos (1277–1320), eldest son of Andronikos II

==== Russian rulers ====
- Michael of Russia (1596–1645), first Russian Tsar of the house of Romanov
- Grand Duke Michael Alexandrovich of Russia (1878–1918), the younger brother of Tsar Nicholas II

==== Bulgarian rulers ====
- Michael II Asen (1238/41–1256), tsar of Bulgaria, son of Ivan Asen II
- Michael (Bulgarian pretender) (1270–after 1302), only known son of Constantine Tikh
- Michael III Shishman (after 1280–1330), tsar founder of the House of Shishman

==== Other rulers and noblemen ====
- Michael (son of Anastasios the logothete) (fl. 1042–1058), Byzantine general and governor
- Michael the Syrian (1166–1199), 12th century chronicler and 79th patriarch of the Syriac Orthodox Church
- Michael II the Younger (d. 1215), nephew of Michael the Syrian and antipatriarch of Antioch
- Michael I of Romania (1921-2017)
- Michael the Brave (1558–1601), Prince of Wallachia, Moldavia and Transylvania for a year
- Prince Michael of Greece and Denmark (1939-2024)
- Michael, Prince of Saxe-Weimar-Eisenach (b. 1946)

=== Personages, figures, characters ===
- Michael (archangel), first of God's archangels in the Abrahamic religions
- Michael (gorilla), the first male gorilla to use American Sign Language
- Michael Pemulis, student at the Enfield Tennis Academy in the 1996 novel Infinite Jest by David Foster Wallace

== Arts and entertainment ==
=== Film ===
- Michael (1924 film), a German silent film directed by Carl Theodor Dreyer
- Michael (1996 film), an American fantasy film directed by Nora Ephron
- Michael (2011 Austrian film), a drama directed by Markus Schleinzer
- Michael (2011 Indian film), a psychological thriller directed by Ribhu Dasgupta
- I Am Michael (working title Michael), a 2015 American film by Justin Kelly
- Mikhael (film), a 2019 Indian Malayalam-language film
- Michael (2023 film), an action film directed by Ranjit Jeyakodi
- Michael (2026 film), a biopic based on the life of Michael Jackson

=== Literature ===
- Michael (novel), a 1929 semi-autobiographical novel by Joseph Goebbels
- "Michael" (poem), 1800, by William Wordsworth

=== Music ===
- Michael (Killer Mike album), 2023
- Michael (Les Sins album), 2014
- Michael (Michael Jackson album), 2010
- Michael (soundtrack), 2026
- "Michael" (Franz Ferdinand song), 2004
- "Michael.", a song by Rebecca Black, 2026
- "Michael (the Lover)", a song by the C.O.D.'s, 1965; covered by Geno Washington & the Ram Jam Band, 1967
- "Michael", a song by Rob Zombie from Hellbilly Deluxe 2, 2010
- "Michael", a song by Suzi Quatro from Your Mamma Won't Like Me, 1975

=== Television ===
- "Michael" (Glee), a 2012 episode
- "Michael" (Stargate Atlantis), a 2006 episode

== Places ==
- Michael, Isle of Man, a sheading (historic district)
- Michael (parish), on the Isle of Man
- Michael, Illinois, an unincorporated community in the US

== Events ==
- Michael (hurricane); see List of hurricanes named Michael
  - Hurricane Michael, an especially severe storm in 2018
- Operation Michael, a German attack in the Spring Offensive of World War I

== Other uses ==
- Michael (ship), a list of ships
- MICHAEL, a message integrity check used in the Temporal Key Integrity Protocol

== See also ==
- Saint Michael (disambiguation)
- Michaels (disambiguation), variant of Michael, often a surname
- Mickey (disambiguation), common name derived from Michael
- Mike (disambiguation), common name derived from Michael, with other meanings
- Micheal, Gaelic name
- Michel (disambiguation), French language variant of Michael
- Michele (given name), Italian language variant (male given name)
- Miguel (disambiguation), Spanish and Portuguese language variant of Michael
- Mikhail (disambiguation)
