= Mikhaylovsk, Stavropol Krai =

Town in Stavropol Krai, Russia

Mikhaylovsk Михайловск
- Town
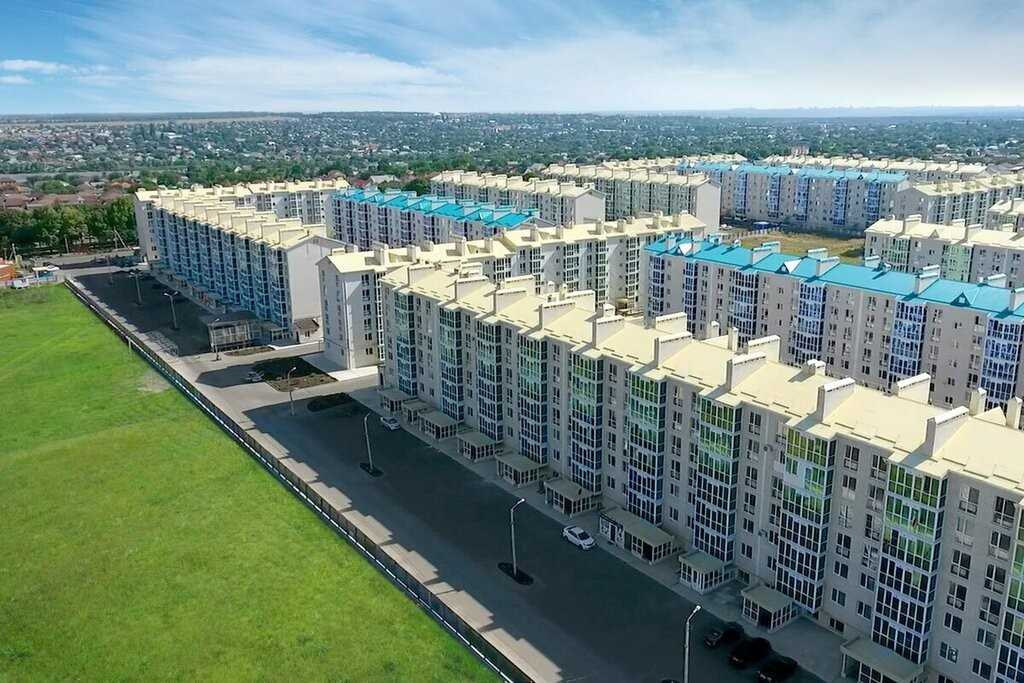

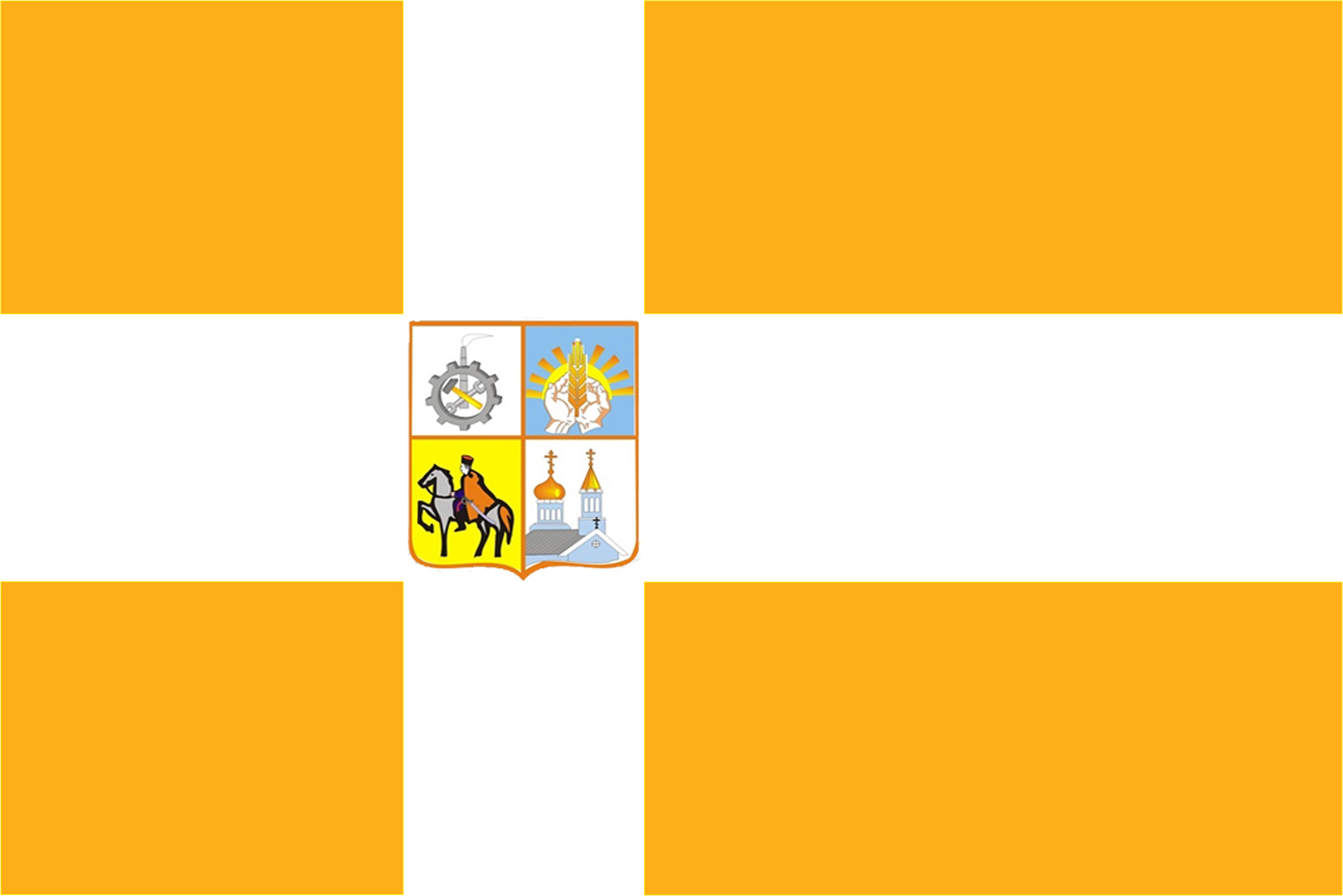
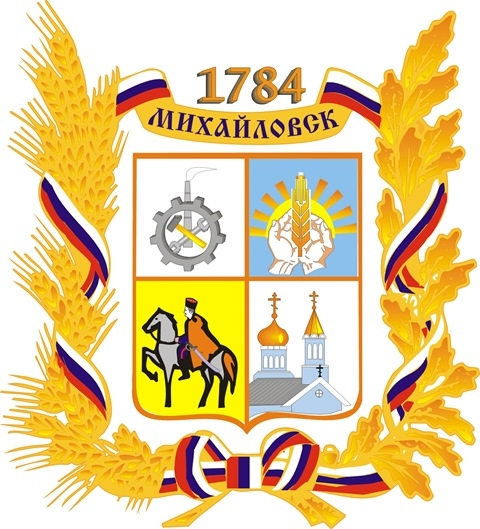
- Flag Coat of arms
- Interactive map of Mikhaylovsk
- Location of Mikhaylovsk Mikhaylovsk (Stavropol Krai)
- Coordinates: 45°08′N 42°02′E
- Country: Russia
- Federal subject: Stavropol Krai
- Administrative district: Shpakovsky District
- TownSelsoviet: Mikhaylovsk
- Founded: 1784
- Town status since: 1999
- Elevation: 440 m (1,440 ft)

Population (2010 Census)
  - Total: 70,981
  - Estimate (2025): 113,701 (+60.2%)

Administrative status
  - Capital of: Shpakovsky District, Town of Mikhaylovsk

Municipal status
  - Municipal district: Shpakovsky Municipal District
  - Urban settlement: Mikhaylovsk Urban Settlement
  - Capital of: Shpakovsky Municipal District, Mikhaylovsk Urban Settlement
- Time zone: UTC+3 (MSK)
- Postal code: 356240–356245
- OKTMO ID: 07658101001
- Website: www.mihailovsk-city.ru

Mikhaylovsk (Russian: Миха́йловск) is a town and the administrative center of Shpakovsky District in Stavropol Krai, Russia, located along the Tashla River, 10 kilometers (6.2 mi) northeast of Stavropol, the administrative center of the krai. Population: 114,133 (2021 census); 70,981 (2010 census); 58,153 (2002 census); 42,993 (1989 Soviet census). From 2010 to 2021, Mikhaylovsk's population grew to 114,133, achieving the fastest population growth rate of all regional cities in Russia.

== History ==
It was founded in 1784 as the village of Mikhaylovskoye (Миха́йловское) and later became a Cossack stanitsa. In 1870, it lost its military significance and was demoted to rural status. In 1963, it was renamed Shpakovskoye (Шпа́ковское). It was granted town status and given its present name in 1999.

== Administrative and municipal status ==
Within the framework of administrative divisions, Mikhaylovsk serves as the administrative center of Shpakovsky District. As an administrative division, it is, together with three rural localities, incorporated within Shpakovsky District as the Town of Mikhaylovsk. As a municipal division, the Town of Mikhaylovsk is incorporated within Shpakovsky Municipal District as Mikhaylovsk Urban Settlement.

== Economy ==
The following industrial enterprises operate in the town:

- Combine of building materials
- Auto parts factory
- Poultry factory
- Breeder
- Brickyard

=== Transportation ===
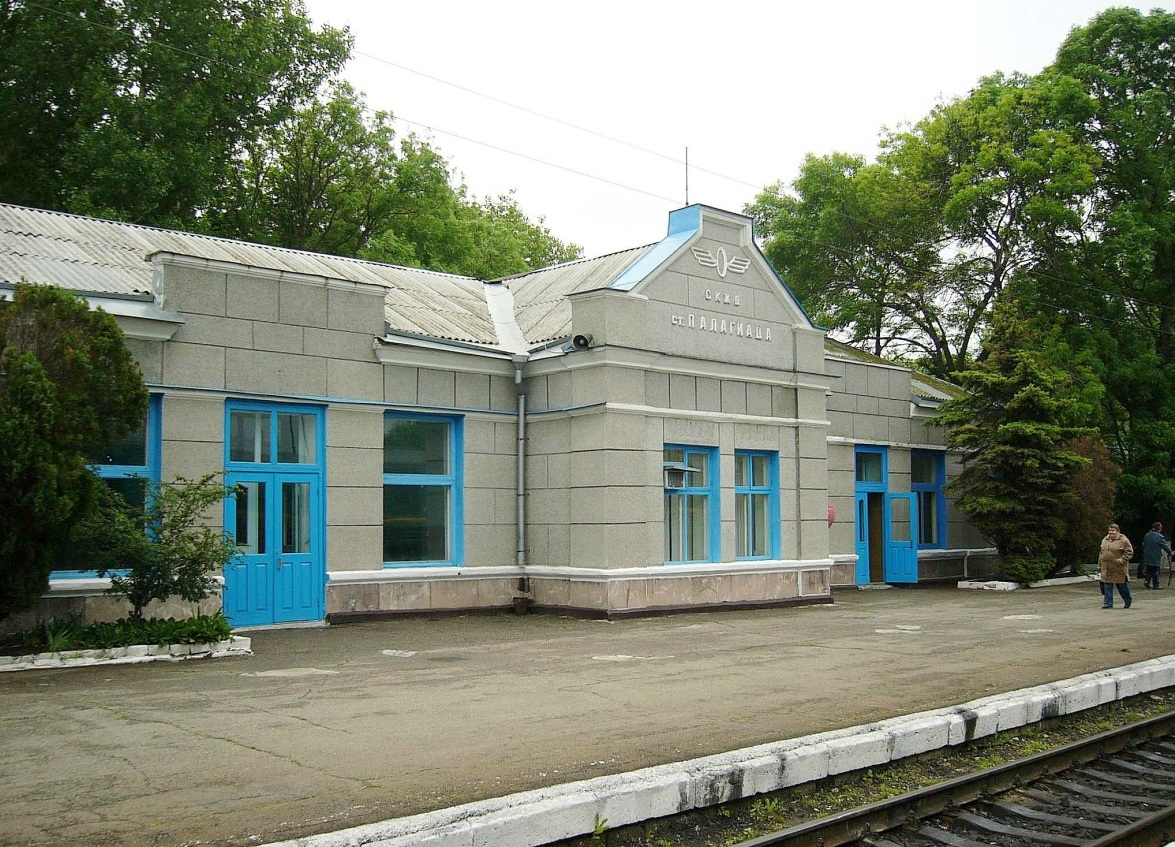
Pelagiada railway station in Mikhaylovsk

Pelagiada railway station is located within the town; with directions to Elista, Stavropol, and Kavkazskaya railway stations.

== Demographics ==
- Russians: 50,626 persons (87.1%)
- Armenians: 4,454 persons (7.7%)
- Romani: 747 persons (1.3%)
- Ukrainians: 737 persons (1.3%)
  Historical population
  Year	Pop.	±%
  1897	7,604	—
  1926	10,488	+37.9%
  1939	8,608	−17.9%
  1959	12,296	+42.8%
  1970	21,492	+74.8%
  1979	32,266	+50.1%
  1989	42,993	+33.2%
  2002	58,153	+35.3%
  2010	70,981	+22.1%
  2021	114,133	+60.8%
  Source: Census data
