= Michaelson =

- Pronunciation: MĪ-kul-son

Origin
- Origin: Michael
- Meaning: "son of 'Who is like God'"
- Region of origin: Hebrew

Other names
- Variant forms: De Michele, Di Michele, De Micheli, Michaels, Michaelsen, Michalopoulos, Míchalou, Michalovič, Michałowicz, Michelson, Mickelson, Miguélez, Mihăilescu, Mihailović, Mihajlovski, Mihál(y)fi, Mihál(y)ffy, Mihál(y)fy, Mihovilović, Mijailović, Mika(y)elian, Mika(y)elyan, Miķelsons, Mikhaylov, Mikhaylovsky, Mykhaylenko, Mykolavičius, Papamichail

Michaelson is an English patronymic surname meaning "son of Michael". There are varied English and Scandinavian spellings. It is rare as a given name. Notable people with the surname include:

- Ben Michaelson (born 1981), American swimmer
- Ingrid Michaelson (born 1979), American singer/songwriter
- Isaac Michaelson (1903–1982), Scottish-born Israeli ophthalmologist
- M. Alfred Michaelson (1878–1949), American politician
- Ron Michaelson, American actor
- Scott Michaelson (born 1968), Australian actor

== Fictional characters ==
- Jack Michaelson, fictional character in the British soap opera, Brookside, played by actor Paul Duckworth
- Louis Michaelson, a character played by Fred Savage in the 1986 American fantasy drama film The Boy Who Could Fly
