= Mikael =

Mikael is a masculine given name, a variant of the Hebrew name Michael (מִיכָאֵל), which means "Who is like God". It is used predominantly throughout Scandinavia and Finland. Mikaela is the feminine form of the name. In France, the name is written Mikaël, a tréma on the letter e, and is of Breton origin.

Notable people with the name Mikael or Mikaël include:

== Entertainment ==
- Mikael Birkkjær (born 1958), Danish actor
- Mikael Håfström (born 1960), Swedish director and screenwriter
- Mikael Nyqvist (1960–2017), Swedish actor
- Mikael Persbrandt (born 1963), Swedish actor
- Mikael Salomon (born 1945), Danish cinematographer, director and producer

== Music ==
- Mikael Åkerfeldt (born 1974), Swedish musician
- Mikael Gabriel (born 1990), Finnish rapper
- Mikael Jorgensen (born 1972), American musician
- Mikael Stanne (born 1974), Swedish musician
- Mikael Temrowski (born 1992), American Musician

== Politics ==
- Mikael Cederbratt (1955–2020), Swedish politician of the Moderate Party
- Mikael Eskilandersson (born 1977), Swedish politician of the Sweden Democrats
- Mikael Jansson (born 1965), Swedish politician of Alternative for Sweden
- Mikael Jungner (born 1965), Finnish politician of the Social Democratic Party
- Mikael Odenberg (born 1953), Swedish politician of the Moderate Party
- Mikael Oscarsson (born 1967), Swedish politician for the Christian Democrats
- Mikael Strandman (born 1966), Swedish politician of the Sweden Democrats

== Sports ==
- Mikael Anderson (born 1998), Icelandic footballer
- Mikael Appelgren (born 1961), Swedish table tennis player
- Mikael Backlund (born 1989), Swedish ice hockey player
- Mikael Egill Ellertsson (born 2002), Icelandic footballer
- Mikael Filipe Viana de Sousa, Brazilian footballer
- Mikael Forssell (born 1981), Finnish footballer
- Mikael Granlund (born 1992), Finnish ice hockey player
- Mikaël Grenier (born 1992), Canadian racing driver
- Mikael Hellström (born 1972), Swedish footballer
- Mikael Jantunen (born 2000), Finnish basketball player
- Mikaël Kingsbury (born 1992), Canadian freestyle skier
- Mikael Laihonen (born 1994), Finnish basketball player
- Mikael Lustig (born 1986), Swedish footballer
- Mikael Örn (born 1961), Swedish swimmer
- Mikael Renberg (born 1972), Swedish ice hockey player
- Mikaël Silvestre (born 1977), French footballer
- Mikael Soisalo (born 1998), Finnish footballer
- Mikael Tillström (born 1972), Swedish tennis player
- Mikael Wikstrand (born 1993), Swedish ice hockey player

== Other ==
- Mikael Males (born 1977), Swedish professor of medieval studies

== Fictional characters ==
- Mikael Blomkvist, from the Millennium series of Swedish crime novels, created by journalist Stieg Larsson
- Mikael, from The Originals

== See also ==
- Mikaël (film), 1924 German film based on Herman Bang's novel of the same name
- Michael
- Mikkel
- Mikal (given name)
- Mikko
