= Michaelsen =

- Pronunciation: MĪ-kul-sen

Origin
- Origin: Michael
- Meaning: "son of 'Who is like God'"
- Region of origin: Denmark

Other names
- Variant forms: Michaelson, Michelson, Mickelson, Michelsen, Mikkelsen

Michaelsen is a Danish patronymic surname meaning "son of Michael". There are related English, German, Norwegian, Swedish and other Scandinavian spellings of this name. People with the name Michaelsen include:

== People ==
- Gottfried Michaelsen, a.k.a. Gödeke Michels (died 1402), German pirate
- Helena Iren Michaelsen (born 1977), Norwegian singer
- Helle Michaelsen (born 1968), Danish model, actress
- Jacob Michaelsen (1899–1970), Danish boxer
- Jan Michaelsen (born 1970), Danish football player
- Kari Michaelsen (born 1961, née Markusen), American actress
- Kirsten Michaelsen (born 1943), Danish swimmer
- Lars Michaelsen (born 1969), Danish road bicycle racer
- Melissa Michaelsen (born 1968), American actress
- Michael Michaelsen (1899–1970), Danish Olympics boxer
- Peter Michaelsen, inventor of Cannon shogi
- Peter Michaelsen (born 1971), American actor, director, and producer also known as Peter Billingsley
- Wilhelm Michaelsen (1860–1937), German zoologist
