= Mihails =

- Gender: Male
- Name day: 29 September

Origin
- Region of origin: Latvia

Other names
- Related names: Miķelis

Mihails is a Latvian masculine given name. It is a cognate of the name Michael and may refer to:

- Mihails Arhipovs (born 1974), Latvian bobsledder and Olympic competitor
- Mihails Miholaps (born 1974), Latvian football striker
- Mihails Smorodins (born 1952), Latvian football striker
- Mihails Tāls (1936–1992), Latvian chess Grandmaster
- Mihails Vasiļonoks (born 1948), Latvian ice hockey goalie
- Mihails Zemļinskis (born 1969), Latvian football player
- Mihails Ziziļevs (born 1973), Latvian football midfielder
