= Mihajlovski =

Mihajlovski (Macedonian: Михајловски) is the Macedonianization of the Bulgarian surname Mihailov, meaning 'of Mihajlo' (English: Michael).

It may refer to:

- Ana Mihajlovski (born 1982) Serbian TV presenter
- Igor Mihajlovski, Macedonian basketball player
- Ljubomir Mihajlovski (born 1954) Macedonian minister of internal affairs
- Mihajlo Mihajlovski, Macedonian sport administrator
- Toni Mihajlovski, Macedonian actor and stand up comedian
- Zvonko Mihajlovski, Serbian sports television anchor

== See also ==
- Mihajlović
