= Michelson =

Michelson may refer to:

- Michelson (surname), people with the given name or surname
- 27758 Michelson discovered in 1991
- Michelson (crater) on the Moon
- Michelson–Gale–Pearson experiment, science
- Michelson interferometer, most common configuration for optical interferometry
- Michelson–Morley experiment, a scientific experiment regarding the luminiferous ether.
- Michelson Museum of Art, Texas, USA
- Mount Michelson (Brooks Range), Alaska, USA
- USNS Michelson T-AGS-23, United States Naval ship
- Michelson, the domain-specific language for smart contracts in Tezos
- Michelson, Michigan, an unincorporated community

== See also ==
- Mickelson
- Michaelson
