= Michelson (surname) =

- Pronunciation: MĪ-kul-son

Origin
- Origin: Michael
- Meaning: "son of 'Who is like God'"

Other names
- Variant forms: Michaelson, Mickelson, Michaelsen, Michelsen, Mickelsen

Michelson is a patronymic surname meaning "son of Michel". The prefix Michel-, a variant of Michael, comes from the Hebrew: מִיכָאֵל / מיכאל (mee-KHA-el), meaning "Who is like God?". A common English language surname, there are other English and Scandinavian spellings. It is rare as a given name. People with the name Michelson include:

- Albert Abraham Michelson (1852–1931), American physicist, Nobel Prize winner
- Frida Michelson (1906–1982), Latvian jew, Holocaust survivor, writer
- Gary K. Michelson (born 1949), American orthopedic spinal surgeon and inventor
- Harold Michelson (1920–2007), American illustrator
- Ivan Ivanovich Michelson (1740–1807) Baltic-German military commander, general in the Russian Imperial Army
- Leo Michelson (1887–1978), Latvian-American artist
- Lisa Michelson (1958–1991), American actress
- Miriam Michelson (1870–1942), journalist, writer, and feminist
- Peter Michelson, American physicist
- Richard Michelson (born 1953), American writer and poet
- Robert C. Michelson (born 1951), American researcher, progenitor of the field of aerial robotics
- Truman Michelson (1879–1938), American Indo-Europeanist
