= Mihailovich =

Mihailovich is a surname of South Slavic origin, an Anglicization of Mihailović or Mihajlović. Notable people with the surname include:

- Alex Mihailovich
- Ane Mihailovich
- Draggan Mihailovich
