= Mikel =

Mikel is the Basque adaptation of the given name Michael. The name Mikel has its roots in the Hebrew word Mikha'el, which means "Who is like God". It is also used mainly by Albanians, as well as other Europeans.

Notable people with the name include:

== Footballers ==
- Mikel Agu (born 1993), Nigerian footballer
- Mikel Aguirregomezkorta (born 1974), Spanish footballer
- Mikel Alonso (born 1980), Spanish Basque footballer and older brother of retired Spanish international Xabi Alonso
- Mikel Álvaro (born 1982), Spanish footballer
- Mikel Amantegui (born 1979), Spanish footballer
- Mikel Antía (born 1973), Spanish footballer and coach
- Mikel Aranburu (born 1979), Spanish Basque retired footballer, who played for Real Sociedad
- Mikel Arce (born 1984), Spanish footballer
- Mikel Arguinarena (born 1991), Chilean footballer
- Mikel Arteta (born 1982), retired Spanish Basque footballer, currently head coach at Arsenal F.C.
- Mikel Arruabarrena (born 1983), Spanish Basque footballer
- Mikel Balenziaga (born 1988), Spanish Basque footballer
- Mikel Brahilika (born 1999), Albanian footballer
- Mikel Canka (born 1987), Albanian footballer
- Mikel Dañobeitia Martín (born 1986), Spanish footballer
- Mikel Gogorza (born 2006), Danish footballer
- Mikel González (born 1985), Spanish Basque footballer
- Mikel Iribas (born 1988), Spanish footballer and manager
- Mikel Janku (1941–2019), Albanian footballer
- Mikel Jauregizar (born 2003), Spanish footballer
- Mikel John Obi (born 1987), Nigerian footballer
- Mikel Kaloshi (born 1993), Albanian footballer
- Mikel Kortina (born 1974), Spanish retired footballer
- Mikel Labaka (born 1980), Spanish Basque footballer
- Mikel Lasa (born 1971), Spanish retired footballer
- Mikel Llorente (born 1981), Spanish footballer and manager
- Mikel Loinaz (born 1967), Spanish footballer
- Mikele Leigertwood (born 1982), Antiguan retired footballer
- Mikel Leshoure (born 1990), American footballer, currently playing for the Detroit Lions in the NFL
- Mikel Martins (born 1983), Spanish footballer
- Mikel Merino (born 1996), Spanish footballer
- Mikel Orbegozo (born 1989), Spanish footballer
- Mikel Oyarzabal (born 1997), Spanish footballer, currently playing for Real Sociedad
- Mikel Pagola (born 1982), Spanish footballer
- Mikel Rico Moreno (born 1984), Spanish footballer
- Mikel Rodríguez (born 2002), Spanish footballer
- Mikel Roteta (born 1970), Spanish retired footballer
- Mikel Saizar (born 1983), Spanish Basque footballer
- Mikel San José (born 1989), Spanish Basque footballer, currently playing for Athletic Bilbao
- Mikel Santamaría (born 1987), Spanish footballer
- Mikel Spaho (born 1982), Albanian footballer
- Mikel Vesga (born 1993), Spanish footballer
- Mikel Villanueva (born 1993), Venezuelan footballer
- Mikel Zarrabeitia (Spanish footballer) (born 1993)

== Other sportsmen ==
- Mikel Aguirrezabalaga (born 1984), Spanish handball player
- Mikel Alonso (Spanish cyclist) (born 1996)
- Mikel Aristi (born 1993), Spanish cyclist
- Mikel Artetxe (born 1976), Spanish cyclist
- Mikel Astarloza (born 1979), Spanish cyclist
- Mikel Azcona (born 1996), Spanish racing driver
- Mikele Barber (born 1980), American sprinter
- Mikel Bizkarra (born 1989), Spanish cyclist
- Mikel Brown Jr. (born 2006), American basketball player
- Mikel de Sa (born 1990), Andorran sprinter
- Mikel Gaztañaga (born 1979), Spanish cyclist
- Mikel Iturria (born 1992), Spanish cyclist
- Mikel Jones (born 2000), American football player
- Mikel Landa (born 1989), Spanish cyclist
- Mikel Nieve (born 1984), Spanish cyclist
- Mikel Odriozola (born 1973), Spanish race walker
- Mikel Pradera (born 1975), Spanish cyclist
- Mikel Schreuders (born 1998), Aruban swimmer
- Mikel Scicluna (1929 – 2010), Maltese professional wrestler
- Mikel Thomas (born 1987), Trinidadian sprinter
- Mikel Unanue (born 1982), Spanish curler
- Mikel Zarrabeitia (born 1970), Spanish cyclist

== Musicians ==
- Mikel Erentxun (born 1965), Venezuelan musician
- Mikel Herzog (born 1960), Spanish musician
- Mikel Japp (1952 – 2012), Welsh musician
- Mikel Laboa (1934 – 2008), Spanish musician
- Mikelangelo Loconte (born 1973), Italian musician
- Mikel Rouse (born 1957), American composer
- Mikel Jollett (born 1974), American musician and author

== Others ==
- Mikel Aranburu Urtasun (born 1955), Spanish politician
- Mikel Arriola (born 1975), Mexican lawyer
- Mikel Azurmendi (1942–2021), Basque writer, anthropologist and activist
- Mikel Burley, British scholar of religion and philosophy
- Mikel Bustamante (born 1986), Spanish actor
- Mikel Campos (born 1986), Filipino actor
- Mikel Cee Karlsson (born 1977), Swedish filmmaker
- Mikel Conrad (1919–1982), American producer, director and writer
- Mikel de Epalza (1938–2008), Spanish scholar of Arab and Islamic studies
- Mikel Dufrenne (1910–1995), French philosopher
- Mikel Dunham, American author, artist, photo journalist and historian
- Mikel Harry (1951–2017), American author and management consultant
- Mikel Herrán (born 1991), Spanish historian, drag artist and YouTuber
- Mikel Herzog (born 1960), Spanish singer
- Mikel Huerga Leache (born 1989), Spanish chess grandmaster
- Mikel Iglesias (born 1996), Spanish actor
- Mikel Irujo (born 1972), Spanish politician
- Mikel Jollett (born 1974), American musician and author
- Mikel Koliqi (1902–1997), Albanian Catholic cardinal
- Mikel Lejarza (born 1947), Spanish spy
- Mikel Losada (born 1978), Basque actor
- Mikel Parial (born 1972), Filipino painter and photographer
- Mikel Rueda (born 1980), Spanish director and screenwriter
- Mikel Torres (born 1970), Spanish politician
- Mikel Unzalu (1956–2021), Spanish politician
- Mikel Urizarbarrena, Basque entrepreneur
- Mikel Zabalza Garate (1952–1985), Basque bus driver and governmental torture victim
- Mikel Zalbide (born 1951), Basque linguist

== See also ==
- Mikel Coffee Company, Greek chain of coffee houses operating in several countries
- Mikal (given name)
- Mykel, given name
- Michael (given name)
