= Cheal =

Cheal, Cheale or Cheel may refer to:

== People ==
- Anne Cheale (fl. 2000–2011), British councillor
- Edwin Cheel (1872–1951), Australian botanist
- Jay Cheel (born 1979), Canadian filmmaker
- John Cheale (fl. 1650–1685), English politician
- Peter Cheal (1846–1931), New Zealand surveyor

== Other uses ==
- Cheal Point, South Orkney Islands, Antarctica
- Cheel Arena, multi-purpose arena in Potsdam, New York, USA

== See also ==
- Chell (disambiguation)
- Chiel (disambiguation)
