= Lazuren Bryag Cove =

Cove in Coronation Island in the Southern Ocean

- Map of the South Orkney Islands

- Location in Antarctica
- Coordinates: 60°37′50″S 46°00′45″W
- Max. length: 900 metres (980 yd)
- Max. width: 1.5 kilometres (0.93 mi)

Lazuren Bryag Cove (Bulgarian: залив Лазурен бряг, romanized: zaliv Lazuren bryag, IPA: [ˈzalif ɫɐˈzurɛn ˈbrʲak]) is the 1.5 km wide cove indenting for 900 m the southwest coast of Coronation Island in the South Orkney Islands, Antarctica. It is entered southeast of Return Point and northwest of Cheal Point. The area was visited by early 19th century sealers.

The cove is "named after the freezer vessel Lazuren Bryag of the Bulgarian company Ocean Fisheries – Burgas whose ships operated in the waters of South Georgia, Kerguelen, the South Orkney Islands, South Shetland Islands and Antarctic Peninsula from 1970 to the early 1990s. The Bulgarian fishermen, along with those of the Soviet Union, Poland and East Germany are the pioneers of modern Antarctic fishing industry."

== Location ==
Lazuren Bryag Cove is centred at 60°37′50″S 46°00′45″W. British mapping in 1963.

== Maps ==
- British Antarctic Territory: South Orkney Islands. Scale 1:100000 topographic map. DOS Series 510. Surrey, England: Directorate of Overseas Surveys, 1963
- Antarctic Digital Database (ADD). Scale 1:250000 topographic map of Antarctica. Scientific Committee on Antarctic Research (SCAR). Since 1993, regularly upgraded and updated
