= Mijailović =

Mijailović (Serbian Cyrillic: Мијаиловић) is a Serbian surname, a patronymic derived from the masculine given name Mijailo.

Notable people with the name include:

- Mijailo Mijailović (born 1978), self-confessed and convicted assassin of the Swedish Minister for Foreign Affairs Anna Lindh, stabbed in 2003
- Nikola Mijailović (footballer) (born 1982), Serbian footballer
- Nikola Mijailović (singer) (born 1973), Serbian baritone with international opera career since the mid-1990s
- Nikola Mijailović (volleyball), Serbian volleyball player
- Srđan Mijailović (born 1993), Serbian football player
