= Pijetlović =

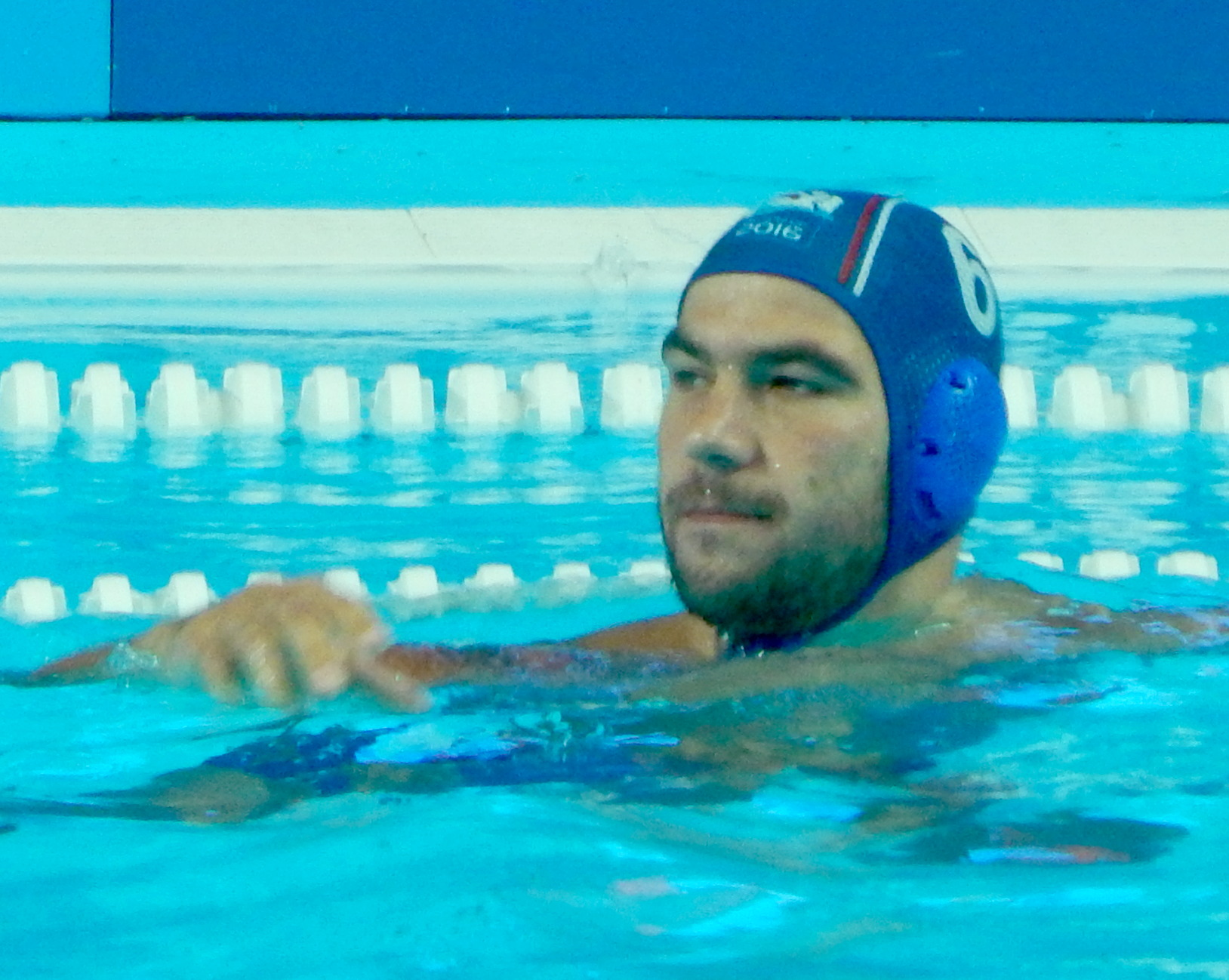
Duško Pijetlović in the Gold medal match between Team Serbia and Team Croatia

Pijetlović (Serbian Cyrillic: Пијетловић) is a Serbian surname. Notable people with the surname include:

- Duško Pijetlović (born 1985), Serbian water polo player
- Gojko Pijetlović (born 1983), Serbian water polo player
