= Mishka =

"Mishka" is a diminutive form of the name "Mikhail (disambiguation)".

It also means "gift of love" in Hindi, "niche for light" in Arabic, and "gift of god" in Hebrew.

Mishka may also refer to:

- Mishka (musician), a Bermudian reggae musician
- Mishka NYC, a clothing company and record label
- Misha, a mascot for the 1980 Olympics, also known as Mishka
- Mishka Island, a small island in Bulgaria located within the Danube river

== People with the given name "Mishka" ==
- Mishka Henner (born 1976), Belgian-British artist
- Mishka Yaponchik (1891-1919), Jewish-Russian-Ukrainian gangster, revolutionary and military leader
- Mishka Schneiderova, a character on the Australian soap opera Neighbours

== See also ==
- Misha (disambiguation)
- Mischa (disambiguation)
