= Machiel (given name) =

Machiel is a Dutch form of the masculine given name Michael. People with the name include:

- Machiel Bosman (born 1972), Dutch historian and writer
- Machiel Brandenburg (1907–1984), Dutch painter who emigrated to South Africa
- Machiel de Graaf (born 1969), Dutch politician
- Machiel van den Heuvel (1900–1946), Dutch army officer, Escape Officer at Colditz
- Machiel van Keulen (born c.1984), Dutch footballer
- Machiel Kiel (1938–2025), Dutch art historian and orientalist
- Machiel Hendricus Laddé (1866–1932), Dutch photographer and film director
- Machiel Noordeloos (born 1949), Dutch mycologist

== See also ==
- Michiel, more common Dutch form of the name
- Machiel, town in northern France
