= Serbian name =

This article features the naming culture of personal names of ethnic Serbs and the Serbian language. Serbian names are rendered in the "Western name order" with the surname placed after the given name. "Eastern name order" may be used when multiple names appear in a sorted list, particularly in official notes and legal documents in which the last name is capitalised (MILOVANOVIĆ Janko).

== Given names ==
A child is given a first name chosen by their parents or godparents. The given name comes first, the surname last. For example, in Željko Popović, Željko is a first name and Popović is a family name.

Serbian first names largely originate from Slavic roots: Miroslav, Vladimir, Zoran, Ljubomir, Vesna, Radmila, Milica, Svetlana, Slavica, Božidarka, Milorad, Dragan, Milan, Goran, Radomir, Vukašin, Miomir, Branimir, Budimir; see also Slavic names and the list of Slavic names in the Serbian Wikipedia)

Some may be non-Slavic but chosen to reflect Christian faith. Names of this nature may often originate from Hebrew for Biblical reasons. Christian names include Nikola, Ivan, Jovan, Marija, Ana, Mihailo. Along similar lines of non-Slavic names among Christians, the origins for many such names are Greek such as Aleksandar, Andrej, Teodora, Jelena, Sofija, Katarina, Nikola, Đorđe, Stefan, Petar, Vasilije, Todor. Names of Latin origin include Marko, Anđelka, Antonije, Pavle, Srđan, Marina, Natalija, Kornelije. Names of Germanic origin, entering through Russian, include Igor, Oliver, Olga.

In Serbian naming culture, apotropaic names (zaštitna imena, "protective names") include Vuk (and its many derivatives), Nenad, Prodan, Sredoje, Staniša, and others.

Examples (table)

Serbian	Derivation	Origin	Meaning	Related (Forms)	Female
Miroslav; Мирослав		Slavic	Peace and Glory	Mirosław, Mirko	Mira, Miroslava
Vladimir; Владимир	Владимѣръ	Slavic; Old Church Slavonic	Rule in Peace	Vlada, Vlado	Vladimira, Vlada
Vukašin; Вукашин		Slavic	Son of the wolf, younger wolf	Vuki, Vuk, Vule, Vučko, Vukosav	Vuka, Vukica
Zoran; Зоран		Slavic	Daybreak	Zoki, Zoća	Zora, Zorana, Zorica
Goran; Горан		Slavic	Woodsman, Highlander "The tall one"		Gora, Gorana, Gorica, Goga, Gorjanka
Aleksandar; Александар	Aléxandros; Αλέξανδρος	Greek	Protector of Man	Aleksa, Saša, Sale	Aleksandra, Saša, Saška
Jovan; Јован	Ioannis; Ιωάννης	Hebrew (Biblical)	God is gracious	Ivan; Jovo, Jovica, Joca, Jole	Jovana, Ivana, Ivanka, Iva
Marko; Марко	Marcus	Latin	God of war, To be war like	Maki, Mare	
Nikola; Никола	Nikolaos; Νικόλαος	Greek	Victory of the people	Nidža, Niko	Nikoleta, Nikolina
Đorđe; Ђopђe	Georgios; Γεώργιος	Greek	Farmer	Đurađ; Đuro, Đole, Đoka, Đorđa, Đorđo	Đorđica, Đurđica, Đurđina
Mihajlo; Михајло	Mikha'el מִיכָאֵל	Hebrew (Biblical)	"He who is like God"	Mika, Miki, Miha, Miša	

== Surnames ==
Most Serbian surnames have the surname suffix -ić (Serbian Cyrillic: -ић) ([itɕ]). This can sometimes further be transcribed as -ic, but Serbian names have often been transcribed with a phonetic ending, -ich or -itch.

This form is often associated with Serbs from before the early 20th century and so Milutin Milanković is usually referred to, for historical reasons, as Milutin Milankovitch, and Mileva Marić, born in Vojvodina (then a part of Hungary) has sometimes been rendered as Marity (e.g. in the claim of "Einstein-Marity" theory).

The -ić suffix is a Slavic diminutive, originally functioning to create patronymics. Thus, the surname Petrović means the "little son of Petar" (Petrić means "little son of Petra", the widow).

Most Serbian surnames are paternal (father), maternal (mother), occupational or are derived from personal traits.

Other common surname suffixes are -ov (-ов), -ev (-ев), -in (-ин) and -ski (-ски; also -cki(-цки)/čki(чки)/ški(шки)) which is the Slavic possessive suffix, thus Nikola's son becomes Nikolin, Petar's son Petrov, and Jovan's son Jovanov. The two suffixes are often combined, most commonly as -ović (-овић). Other, less common, suffices are -alj(-аљ)/olj(ољ)/elj(ељ), -ija (-ија), -ica (-ица), -ar(-ар)/ac(ац)/an(ан).

When marrying, the woman most often adopts her husband's family name though she can also keep both of her last names or not change her last name at all.

It is estimated that some two thirds of all Serbian surnames end in -ić. As of the 2011 Census, the ten most common surnames in Serbia, in order, were Jovanović, Petrović, Nikolić, Marković, Đorđević, Stojanović, Ilić, Stanković, Pavlović, and Milošević.

Outside Serbian countries, Slavic suffixes have been transliterated. Serbs in Hungary have the endings -ity, -ics -its, Serbs in North Macedonia -ikj (or iḱ; Macedonian: иќ), and Serbs in Romania -ici.

Although far less common than patronymic surnames, matronymic surnames are widespread both in Serbia and in neighboring countries where Serbs live. Some examples are surnames such as Katić, Sinđelić, Nedić, Marić, Višnjić, Janjić, Sarić, Miličić, Milenić, Natalić, Zorić, Smiljić and Anđelić. Sometimes, it is difficult to ascertain if the name of a specific family is patronymic or matronymic since many Serbian names have both male and female version (for example, surname Miljanić could come from both m.- Miljan and f.- Miljana). Widows having to become heads of households were not uncommon during 18th and 19th century, and when surnames were first standardised in Serbia in 1851, it was decided they would be based on the names of eldest living heads of households, which were in some cases women. People who did not know their father well would also often take matronymic surnames, a notable case being the hero of the First Serbian Uprising Stevan Sinđelić, who took that surname in honor of his mother Sinđelija.

== History ==
The names of early Serbian rulers like Mutimir were Slavic dithematic names, as per Old Slavic tradition, until the 9th century and Christianisation, when Christian names began to appear.

Demetrios Chomatenos (Archbishop of Ohrid from 1216 to 1236) registered the naming culture of the South Slavs in Byzantine lands. In the 11th and the 12th centuries, family names became more common and stable in Byzantium and were adapted by the majority of people in Byzantine Macedonia, Epirus and other regions (including women, sometimes even monks), not only aristocrats. The South Slavs, however, maintained the tradition of only giving a personal name, sometimes with a Patronymic. There are only 2 cases of family names used by South Slavs during this time; Bogdanopoulos and Serbopoulos, both Serbian names with the Greek suffix -opoulos (όπουλος, originating in Peloponnese in the 10th century). Patronymics ending on -ić, on the other hand, seem to have been the norm by late 14th and the early 15th centuries since nearly all letters in correspondence between Dubrovnik and Serbia and Bosnia from that period contain them. In the same period, proper family names of Slavic origin, not just patronymics, appeared in Dubrovnik and soon in Hum and then in Serbia and Bosnia, where 15th-century nobles start using proper surnames. However, it never became common for ordinary people, and since most of the nobility of Serbia and of Bosnia was wiped out by 16th century, only their remnants in Venice, Hungary and later the Habsburg monarchy, as well as some members of the high clergy, used standard surnames during the following centuries. The general lack of safety made clans start to form in the regions of Montenegro and Herzegovina from the 15th century onwards. The clans were territorially based, but each was subdivided into fraternities and so some people used the names of the fraternities as a surname in those regions but only when speaking to outsiders. They were more toponymics than proper surnames.

In the older naming convention, which was common in Serbia until the mid-19th century, a person's name would consist of three distinct parts: the person's given name, the patronymic derived from father's personal name and the family or fraternity name, as seen in the example of the name of the language reformer Vuk Stefanović Karadžić. However, the convention's use depended on a person's education and interest in ancestry. Most ordinary people were still referred to by their given name and sometimes with a patronymic, professional or toponymic. Serbian surnames, as used today, were first standardised in the Principality of Serbia in 1851. In the 1854 Census, the population was recorded by their fixed surnames for the first time. Most surnames were formed as patronymics (or in some cases matronymics) derived from names of at the time eldest living heads of households, rather than distant ancestors, but there were exceptions. In most cases, such patronymics were already in use so they were simply "frozen" and turned into surnames that carried on into future generations. The swift introduction of surnames is one of the reasons, compared to other regions in which Serbs live, for there to be less variation in forms of surnames within central Serbia, where almost all surnames end with suffixes the -ović (in patronymic surnames) and -ić, which can be used for both patronymic and matronymic surnames.

Serbs who lived across the Drina, Sava and Danube Rivers, in addition to surnames with the most common suffixes, often had surnames based on professions, nicknames, toponymics, traits etc. In the case of what was southern Hungary, Serb suffixes were often intentionally changed by Austro-Hungarian administrators from -ović, -ević and -ić to -ov, -ev, -in and -ski, which in their mind sounded less typically Serbian. The process started around 1817 but particularly intensified after 1860/61, when the Duchy of Serbia and Tamiš Banate were abolished, and 1867, when the Habsburg monarchy became Austro-Hungary. By 1900s, the process had been only moderately successful, and it never achieved its true goal of culturally separating the Vojvodina Serbs from their brethren to the south. In some Serbian-majority regions, which were liberated only by wars from 1912 to 1918, standardised surnames were finally introduced with the creation of the Kingdom of Serbs, Croats and Slovenes, and they were recorded for the first time in the Census of 1921.

== Sobriquets ==
Starting in the late 18th century, many Serbs, working in different fields, have been known by three names: their given name, their surname and an additional sobriquet (distinct from a second surname and specifically used with, as opposed to instead of, their surname or full name).

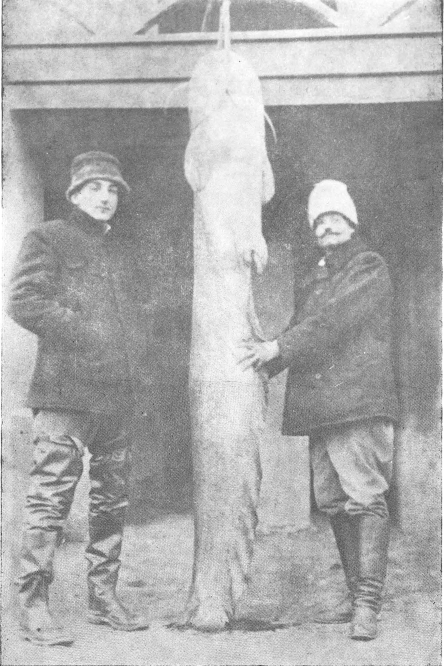
Mihailo Petrović Alas and George, Crown Prince of Serbia posing beside a big catch

Some of them are:

- Petar Nikolajević Moler (1775–1816), first Prime Minister (1815–16) of the Principality of Serbia and a veteran of both the First and Second Serbian Uprisings, whose sobriquet meant "the painter".
- Jovan Jovanović Zmaj (1833–1904), a poet and translator whose sobriquet meant "the dragon".
- Milan Kujundžić Aberdar (1842–1893), a poet, philosopher, and politician whose sobriquet meant "a firearm that hints at good news" (and was also the name of Karađorđe's cannon of the First Serbian Uprising).
- Stevan Stojanović Mokranjac (1856–1914), a composer and music educator whose sobriquet meant "the man from Mokranje", a village in eastern Serbia, the origin of his ancestors.
- Mihailo Petrović Alas (1868–1943), an influential mathematician and inventor and also a professor, businessman, traveller, and volunteer in the Balkan Wars whose sobriquet meant "river fisherman".
- Dragutin Dimitrijević Apis (1876–1917), better known by his nickname Apis ("bee"), the chief of the military intelligence section of the Serbian General Staff in 1913.
- Vladislav Petković Dis (1880–1917), an Impressionist poet whose sobriquet was derived from the second syllable of his given name.
- Vlastimir Pavlović Carevac (1895–1965), a violinist and conductor who was the founder and director of the National Orchestra of Radio Belgrade.
- Ljubomir Pavićević Fis (1927–2015), a graphic and industrial designer whose sobriquet possibly derived from the pronunciation of the French word fils (equivalent to "junior" in English).
- Miodrag Petrović Čkalja (1924–2003), an actor whose stage name and sobriquet was the name of his character, Čkalja, in the 1970 Yugoslav film of the same name.
- Predrag Koraksić Corax (1933-2026), a political caricaturist whose sobriquet was Latin for "raven".
