= Micheal =

Micheal is a masculine given name. It is sometimes an anglicized form of the Irish name Mícheál (also rendered Micheál and Michéal); or the Scottish Gaelic name Mìcheal. Micheal is also a spelling variant of the common masculine given name Michael (in which case the former is usually considered erroneous).

== People with the name Micheal ==
=== Politics ===
- Micheal Bergstrom, American politician in Oklahoma
- Mike Hudema (born 1976; Micheal Hudema), Canadian activist
- Micheal R. Williams (born 1955), American politician in Tennessee

=== Sport ===
- Micheal Azira (born 1987), Ugandan footballer
- Micheal Barrow (born 1970), American football player
- Micheal Clemons (born 1997), American football player
- Micheal Eric (born 1988), Nigerian basketball player
- Micheal Ferland (born 1992), Canadian ice hockey winger
- Micheal Haley (born 1986), Canadian ice hockey forward
- Micheal Henry (born 1991), Nigerian footballer
- Micheal Luck (born 1982), Australian rugby league footballer
- Micheal Nakamura (born 1976), Japanese-born Australian baseball pitcher
- Micheal Ray Richardson (1955–2025), American basketball player and head coach
- Micheal Spurlock (born 1983), American football wide receiver
- Micheal Williams (born 1966), American basketball player

=== Other ===
- Micheal Barrett (born 1964), United States Marine and Sergeant Major of the Marine Corps
- Micheal Clark, American physical therapist
- Micheal Faborode (born 1956), Nigerian educational administrator and a professor of Agricultural Engineering
- Micheal Anak Garing (1988–2019), a Malaysian who was executed in Singapore for murder
- Micheal "Tyga" Stevenson (born 1989), an American rapper, singer, and actor

== People with the name Michéal ==
- Michéal Ó hUiginn (born 1942), Mayor of Galway, Ireland

== People with the name Micheál ==
=== Arts and entertainment ===
- Micheál de Búrc (c.1800 – 1881), Irish poet
- Micheál de Búrca (1912–1985), Irish artist, Director of the National College of Art and Design
- Micheál Mac Liammóir (1899–1978), British-born Irish actor, dramatist, impresario, writer, poet and painter
- Micheál Mac Suibhne (c. 1760–1820), Irish language bard
- Micheál Ó Conghaile (fl. 19th century), Irish scribe
- Micheál Ó Conghaile (writer) (born 1962), Irish writer
- Micheál Ó Síoda (1909–1951), Irish scribe and folklorist
- Micheál Richardson (born 1995), Irish actor

=== Politics ===
- Micheál Clery, Irish Fianna Fáil politician, solicitor and teacher
- Micheál MacGréil (1931–2023), Irish Jesuit priest, sociologist, writer and activist
- Micheál Martin (born 1960), Irish Taoiseach (prime minister)
- Micheál Prendergast (1921–1998), Irish farmer and trader, businessman and company director, and Fine Gael politician

=== Religion ===
- Micheál Ledwith, Irish Catholic priest
- Micheál MacGréil (1931–2023), Irish Jesuit priest, sociologist, writer and activist
- Micheál Ó Mordha (c.1639–1723), Irish priest, philosopher and educationalist
- Micheál Ó Síothcháin, the Irish name of Michael Sheehan (1870–1945), Irish priest, educator and coadjutor archbishop

=== Sport ===
- Micheál Donoghue (born 1974), Irish hurling manager and player
- Micheál Lundy, Irish Gaelic footballer
- Micheál O'Sullivan (born 1977), Irish Gaelic football manager and player
- Micheál Ryan (born 1978), Irish hurler
- Micheál Schlingermann (born 1991), Irish association footballer and Gaelic footballer
- Micheál Webster (born 1977), Irish hurler and Gaelic footballer

=== Other ===
- Micheál Lehane (born 1979), Irish journalist
- Micheál Ó Droigheaín, Irish national school teacher and brigadier

== People with the name Mícheál ==
- Mícheál Breathnach (1881–1908), Irish writer
  - Mícheál Breathnach CLG, a Gaelic Athletic Association club
- Mícheál Cranitch (1912–1999), Irish Fianna Fáil politician
- Mícheál Lally (born 1939), Irish writer and historian
- Mícheál Mac Donncha, Irish Sinn Féin politician
- Mícheál Mac Lochlainn (d. 1349), Bishop of Derry
- Mícheál Ó Cléirigh (c. 1590 – c. 1643), Irish chronicler, scribe and antiquary
- Mícheál Ó Coileáin, the Irish name of Michael Collins (1890–1922), Irish revolutionary, soldier and politician
- Mícheál Ó Cróinín (born 1977), Irish Gaelic footballer and sports broadcaster
- Mícheál Ó Domhnaill (1951–2006), Irish musician, composer and producer
- Mícheál Ó hAirtnéide, the Irish name of Michael Hartnett (1941–1999), Irish poet
- Mícheál Ó hAodha (born 1969), Irish poet and writer
- Mícheál Ó hEidhin, Irish musician and teacher
- Mícheál Ó hEithir, the Irish name of Michael O'Hehir (1920–1996), Irish sports commentator and journalist
- Mícheál O'Higgins, Irish judge and lawyer
- Mícheál Ó hUanacháin (born 1944), Irish poet and journalist
- Mícheál Ó Lócháin (1836–1899), Irish-American writer, magazine editor, and teacher
- Mícheál Ó Móráin (1911–1983), Irish Fianna Fáil politician
- Mícheál Ó Muircheartaigh (born 1930), Irish Gaelic games commentator
- Mícheál Ó Sé (born 1946), Irish sportsperson
- Mícheál Ó Siochfhradha (1900–1986), Irish writer, teacher and storyteller
- Mícheál Ó Súilleabháin (1950–2018), Irish musician, composer, academic and educationalist
- Mícheál Ó Súilleabháin (writer) (1917–2004), Irish writer

== See also ==
- List of Irish-language given names
