= Michiel =

Michiel is a Dutch masculine given name equivalent to Michael and a Venetian surname.

== Given name ==
- Michiel Andrieszoon (died 1684), Dutch pirate
- Michiel Bartman (born 1967), Dutch rower
- Michiel Borstlap (born 1966), Dutch pianist and composer
- Michiel van den Bos (born 1975), Dutch video game composer
- Michiel Josias Botha (born 1947), South African diamond cutter
- Michiel Bothma (born 1973), South African golfer
- Michiel Braam (born 1964), Dutch jazz pianist and composer
- Michiel Carree (1657–1727), Dutch painter
- Michiel Coignet (1549–1623), Flemish polymath
- Michiel II Coignet (1618–1663), Flemish painter, son of the above
- Michiel Coxie (1499–1592), Flemish painter
- Michiel Driessen (born 1959), Dutch fencer
- Michiel Dudok van Heel (1924–2003), Dutch Olympic sailor
- Michiel Elijzen (born 1982), Dutch road bicycle racer
- Michiel G. Eman (born 1961), Aruban Prime Minister
- Michiel van der Gucht (1660–1725), Flemish engraver
- Michiel Hazewinkel (1943–2025), Dutch mathematician
- Michiel van der Heijden (born 1992), Dutch mountain biker and cyclo-cross rider
- Michiel Hemmen (born 1987), Dutch footballer
- Michiel Heyns (born 1943), South African author and translator
- Michiel Holtackers (born 1956), Dutch politician, police officer and trade unionist
- Michiel Horn (born 1939), Dutch-born Canadian historian
- Michiel ten Hove (1640–1689), Grand Pensionary of Holland
- Michiel Huisman (born 1981), Dutch actor and musician
- Michiel van Hulten (born 1969), Dutch Labour Party politician
- Michiel Engel Immenraet (1621–1683), Flemish history and portrait painter
- Michiel Jonckheere (born 1990), Belgian footballer
- Michiel van Kampen (born 1976), Dutch baseball player
- Michiel van Kempen (born 1957), Dutch writer, art historian and literary critic
- Michiel van der Klis (born 1953), Dutch astronomer
- Michiel Hendrik de Kock (1898–1976), South African banker
- Michiel Kramer (born 1988), Dutch footballer
- Michiel van Lambalgen (born 1954), Dutch logician and cognitive scientist
- Michiel Maddersteg (1662–1708), Dutch painter
- Michiel Meyer Cohen (1877–1968), Dutch military commander
- Michiel Jansz van Middelhoven (1562–1638), Dutch theologian portrayed by Frans Hals
- Michiel Jansz. van Mierevelt (1565–1641), Dutch painter and draftsman
- Michiel Mol (born 1969), Dutch businessman and Formula One team owner
- Michiel van Musscher (1645–1705), Dutch painter
- Michiel van Nispen (born 1982), Dutch Socialist Party politician
- Michiel Daniel Overbeek (1920–2001), South African amateur astronomer
- Michiel Reyniersz Pauw (1590–1640), Dutch mayor of Amsterdam and Dutch West India Company director
- Michiel Pesman (1887–1962), Dutch-born American engineer, author and landscape architect
- Michiel Riedijk (born 1964), Dutch architect
- Michiel de Ruyter (1607–1676), Dutch admiral, a.o. famous for the Raid on the Medway
- Michiel Schapers (born 1959), Dutch tennis player
- Michiel Servaes (born 1972), Dutch Labour Party politician
- Michiel Smit (born 1976), Dutch nationalist politician
- Michiel de Swaen (1654–1707), Flemish surgeon and rhetorician
- Michiel Sweerts (1618–1664), Flemish painter and printmaker
- Michiel Thomassen (born 1979), Dutch DJ, music producer and record label owner
- Michiel de Vaan (born 1973), Dutch linguist
- Michiel van Veen (born 1971), Dutch VVD politician
- Michiel Veenstra (born 1976), Dutch radio DJ
- Tijs Michiel Verwest (born 1969), Dutch DJ and music producer known as Tiësto
- Michiel Victor (1910–1998), South African sports shooter
- Michiel Vos (born 1970), Dutch-born American journalist, lawyer, and jurist
- Michiel de Wael (1596–1659), Dutch brewer portrayed by Frans Hals

== Surname ==
The Michiel family was one of the families of the Venetian patriciate:

- Giovanni Michiel (fl. 1220s–1240s), Venetian merchant and administrator
- Giovanni Michiel (1447–1503), Venetian cardinal and bishop
- Marcantonio Michiel (1484–1552), Venetian nobleman, and amateur art critic
- Giustina Renier Michiel (1755–1832), Venetian noblewoman

== See also ==
- Michiels, a Dutch-language patronymic surname
- Sint Michiel, village on Curaçao
- Machiel (given name)
- Chiel, a short version of this name
