= Mykhayliv =

Mykhayliv (Ukrainian: Михайлів) is a Ukrainian surname, derived from the Ukrainian first name Mykhailo or Mykhaylo. It may refer to:

- Roman Mykhayliv (born 2003), Ukrainian football player
- Vitaliy Mykhayliv (born 2005), Ukrainian football player
