= Unzalu =

Unzalu is a surname. Notable people with the surname include:

- Mikel Unzalu (1956–2021), Spanish politician
- Pilar Unzalu (1957–2021), Spanish politician
