= Maicon =

Maicon is a Brazilian variant of the given name Michael. It may refer to:

== Brazilian footballers ==
- Maicon (footballer, born 1981), Maicon Douglas Sisenando, Brazilian football right-back
- Maicon dos Santos (born 1981), Brazilian football midfielder
- Maicon Santos (born 1984), Brazilian football forward
- Maicon (footballer, born 1985), Maicon Thiago Pereira de Souza, Brazilian football midfielder
- Maicon (footballer, born May 1988) (1988–2014), Maicon Pereira de Oliveira, Brazilian football striker
- Maicon (footballer, born September 1988), Maicon Pereira Roque, Brazilian football centre-back
- Maicon (footballer, born 1990), Maicon Marques Bitencourt, Brazilian football winger
- Maicon (footballer, born 1993), Maicon da Silva Moreira, Brazilian football wingback

== Other people ==
- Maicon, half of Brazilian Música sertaneja duo Marlon & Maicon; see Latin Grammy Award for Best Sertaneja Music Album

== See also ==
- Maycon
