= Heavy (Team Fortress 2) =

Heavy Weapons Guy
- Team Fortress 2 character
- RED team Heavy wielding the default minigun
- First appearance: Team Fortress 2; (2007)
- Voiced by: Gary Schwartz

In-universe information
- Full name: Misha
- Alias: Heavy Weapons Guy
- Nickname: Heavy
- Species: Human
- Gender: Male
- Weapon: M134 Minigun (nicknamed "Sasha")
- Origin: Soviet Union
- Nationality: Russian

The Heavy Weapons Guy (real name Misha), better known as the Heavy, is a playable character in the team-based shooter game Team Fortress 2 (TF2) as one of the nine classes. Depicted as a large, intimidating Soviet Russian mercenary primarily wielding a minigun called "Sasha", he is the second iteration of the class known as the Heavy Weapons Guy, drastically redesigned from the original iteration in Team Fortress Classic (1999). The Heavy is categorized in-game as one of the defensive classes, alongside the Engineer and the Demoman, and is often considered the most iconic character of the game's roster.

== Development history ==
The original design (right) and a later redesign (left) of the Heavy Weapons Guy in Team Fortress Classic

The Heavy Weapons Guy was first introduced as a new playable character in the Version 1.1 update to Team Fortress, a 1999 video game mod of the first-person shooter Quake (1996) which was released later that year by Valve Corporation as the stand-alone game Team Fortress Classic (TFC). According to the uncorrected proof of Half-Life 2: Raising The Bar, Version 1.1 was designed by the team of developers (consisting of Robin Walker, John Cook, and Ian Caughley) in response to player feedback to the original release of the mod, which only featured five characters of the eventual roster. According to the proof, the Heavy Weapons Guy soon became the "cover star of the game". Reportedly, the Heavy and his assault cannon was inspired by a similar minigun found in Predator, a film which the developers enjoyed. Slow-moving yet heavily armed, the Heavy of TFC plays a defensive role in the team. A later patch buffed the character to increase its movement speed combined with a lower ping rate, which Keith Pullin of PC Zone said made the Heavy "much easier to use". In TFC, the Heavy's weaponry consists of his signature minigun, a crowbar, shotgun, super shotgun, standard grenades, and cluster grenades. The initial development of the sequel to Team Fortress, then subtitled "Brotherhood of Arms", conceived the Heavy as a more realistic heavily armored soldier wielding shotguns, an assault cannon, and grenades.

The character design of the Heavy in the sequel underwent a drastic change as compared to the Heavy of TFC. As the development of the sequel shifted from the realistic aesthetics of TFC and Brotherhood of Arms to the more cartoony aesthetics of TF2, so the Heavy became more expressive and responsive. Valve senior artist Ted Backman stated "the range of expression that, say, the Heavy goes through, getting ready to fire, getting hit and those types of things, is fully fledged". The new designs of the characters were formally unveiled by Valve on July 19, 2006. In a first of a series of animated shorts about the characters of TF2, Valve released "Meet the Heavy" in 2007, the same year as the official release of the game as part of The Orange Box.

Valve announced the first free character-specific update to the Heavy in August 2008, released on the 19th under the title "A Heavy Update". In addition to several new achievements for the character, the update provided three new unlockable weapons to the Heavy's arsenal: the "Killing Gloves of Boxing," the new minigun "Natascha", and a consumable healing item known as the "Sandvich". The reveal of the Sandvich was promoted by Valve with the animated short "Meet the Sandvich". The first in-game cosmetic for the Heavy, a football helmet, was added in a May 2009 update. In 2016, Valve launched the major "Meet Your Match" update, which involved a contest between the players siding with either the Heavy or Pyro classes—the winning side being determined by victories in competitive or casual play—where only the winner would receive a major class update. As the side of Pyro prevailed, the Heavy did not receive a major update, although the latter did receive the "Second Banana" consumable item in the promised Pyro update in 2017. By 2023, Alex Raisbeck of VideoGamer described the notion of a new "Heavy Update" as having "so little basis in reality, that it's effectively a meme now", with Jakub Błażewicz of Gry-Online referring to it as "mythical".

== Story and character ==
The Heavy Weapons Guy, better known simply as the Heavy, is portrayed in TF2 as a minigun-wielding Soviet man of Russian origin who talks with a thick accent. He is voice-acted by Gary Schwartz, who doubles as the voice of the Demoman. The Heavy is the physically largest and toughest playable character of the game. While intimidating, he has a softer side which he shows especially towards his primary minigun nicknamed "Sasha". Using the D&D alignment chart, Kieron Gillen of Rock Paper Shotgun classified him as chaotic good.

According to the official tie-in comics, the Heavy was born with the given name Misha (short for Mikhail) to a father executed for counter-revolutionary activity. His family was imprisoned in a North Siberian Gulag camp as a result, although they eventually managed to break out during a prison riot instigated by the Heavy. His family hiding in Siberia, the Heavy decided to take up mercenary work to support them, which is what led him to join the team of mercenaries depicted in the game. (Note: "Meet the Director" Update Comics, p. 4 (May 5, 2011). Valve Corporation. Archived from the original on June 2, 2026. Retrieved June 22, 2026.; "A Cold Day in Hell" TF Comics, no. 3 (April 2, 2014). Valve Corporation. Archived from the original on May 27, 2026. Retrieved June 22, 2026.)

== Gameplay ==
The Heavy is categorized in the game as one of the defensive classes, alongside the Demoman and Engineer. His primary weapon is a minigun, which must be first readied by revving up to begin shooting. By default, his secondary weapon is a shotgun, but this can be replaced with a consumable health item such as the Sandvich. The Heavy's fists serve as his melee weapons, with bare fists as defaults and wearable implements as replacements. The Heavy has the highest damage output and health points of all playable characters in the game, but also the slowest speed. His size and slow speed makes him an easier target for enemies such as Spies and Snipers, whereas his health and power make him ideal for support by friendly Medics as well as leading team pushes. The Sandvich is considered a crucial item for healing in the absence of Medics, allowing the Heavy to restore himself back to his maximum 300 health, and can furthermore be thrown as a consumable health kit for teammates.

The Natascha is an alternative unlockable minigun with the ability to slow down enemies it hits at the expense of rev time and damage output. Another alternative is the Huo-Long Heater, (Note: renamed from the "Huo Long Heatmaker" in a 2012 patch) which can consume ammunition to pump out a ring of fire around the Heavy. The Brass Beast deals 20% more damage than the default minigun, but heavily slows movement speed and spin up time. By contrast, the Tomislav spins up faster, is more accurate for further distances, and can rev silently, but has a slower firing speed.

== Reception ==
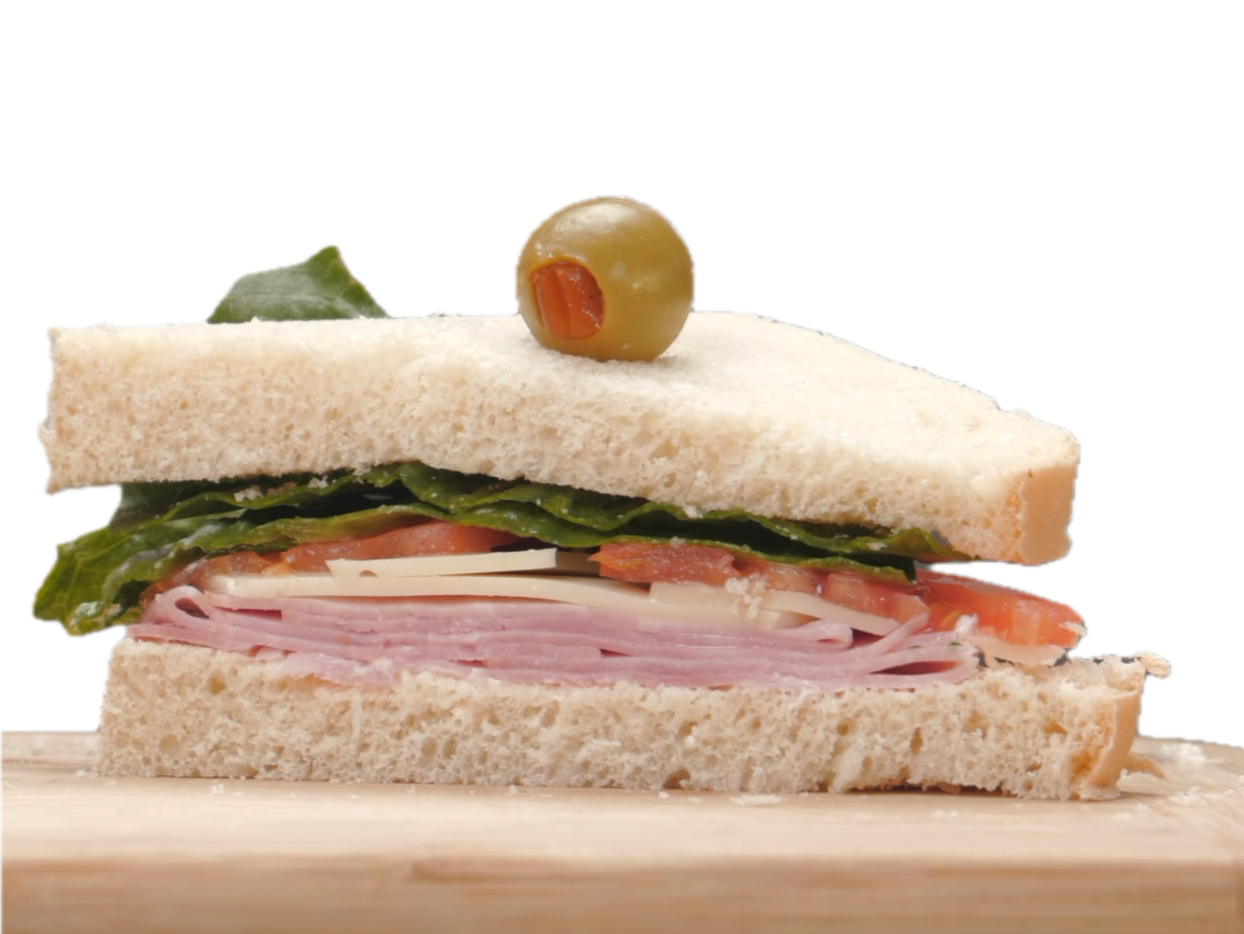
Attempted recreation of the Sandvich: a diagonally cut sandwich containing lettuce, tomatoes, Swiss cheese, slices of meat, with a pimento-stuffed olive attached by a toothpick

In 2021, the Heavy was ranked the 27th most iconic character in PC gaming by PC Gamer magazine, which commented that of any class in TF2, it is the Heavy who "truly represents the game". Blain Polhamus of Dot Esports deemed him "certainly the most iconic member of the TF2 cast", but only ranked the Heavy as the fourth best class of the game. A 2007 review by Alec Meer of Rock Paper Shotgun gave enthusiastic praise for the Heavy as undoubtedly the greatest character of TF2.

In 2012, IGN ranked the Heavy's minigun 61st among the "Top 100 Video Game Weapons". According to Rich Stanton of PC Gamer, his Sandvich is an "iconic item" of the game. He further commented the item "fills a hole in the Heavy's soul. Without it he is not just hungry, but is not even any type of Heavy at all. Its absence brings longing, and a search for what is lost."

Gregory Avery-Weir presented the Heavy as an example of how TF2's character personalities educate new players on their gameplay styles. S.V. Kostrova and Ya.O. Markukhova analyzed the character as an instance of Russian stereotypes in video games, comparing Heavy's appearance and personality to that of a bear, a common symbol of Russia. Two tanks from the team shooter series Overwatch (2016–present) have been likened to the Heavy: Mauga, a large Samoan man equipped with chainguns; and Zarya, a tall muscular woman who wields a particle cannon and also happens to be Russian. Within the TF2 fandom, the Heavy is often jokingly interpreted to be romantically involved with the Medic.

== Appearances in other media ==
The Heavy appears as a rival player in the crossover poker video game Poker Night at the Inventory (2010) together with Tycho Brahe of Penny Arcade, Strong Bad of Homestar Runner, and Max from Sam & Max. Tie-in unlockable Heavy items for TF2 included a cosmetic green eyeshade and the "Iron Curtain" minigun. In January 2013, the Heavy, Spy, and Pyro were introduced as playable characters in Sonic & All-Stars Racing Transformed. A free June 2013 update to Surgeon Simulator features a level where a surgical operation must be performed on the Heavy. The Heavy and his Sandvich are also featured in a free DLC level of I Am Bread (2015). Heavy along with Scout, Medic and Engineer appeared as free DLC in Funko Fusion.
