= Mykel =

Mykel is a masculine given name. Notable people with the name include:

- Mykel Benson (born 1987), American football player
- Mykel Board (born 1950), American journalist, musician, and writer
- Mykel Gray or Miss Mykie (born 1985), American actress, television personality, and recording artist
- Mykel Hawke (born 1965), American actor
- Mykel Shannon Jenkins (born 1969), American actor and filmmaker
- Mykel Williams (born 2004), American football player

== See also ==
- Michael (given name)
- Mikel, given name
