= Funko Fusion =

2024 video game

- Developer: 10:10 Games
- Publisher: 10:10 Games
- Director: Paul Flanagan
- Designers: Jon Burton; Arthur Parsons
- Programmer: Chris Stanforth
- Artist: Leon Warren
- Writers: Jon Burton; Jason Bischoff
- Composer: Ian Livingstone
- Series: Funko
- Engine: Unreal Engine 5
- Platforms: Nintendo Switch; PlayStation 4; PlayStation 5; Windows; Xbox Series X/S
- Release: PlayStation 5, Xbox Series X/S, Windows; September 13, 2024; Nintendo Switch, PlayStation 4; December 6, 2024
- Genre: Action-adventure
- Modes: Single-player, multiplayer

Funko Fusion is a 2024 action-adventure game developed and published by 10:10 Games. The crossover game is based on the "Funko Pop!" toy line created by Funko.

Funko Fusion was released for PlayStation 5, Windows, and Xbox Series X/S on September 13, 2024. The game was also released for PlayStation 4 and Nintendo Switch on December 6. It received mixed reviews from critics and was a commercial failure which led to layoffs at 10:10 Games.

== Gameplay ==
Funko Fusion is a third-person action-adventure video game supporting up to four players, in which the player takes control of various Funko Pop! figures. Following the rise of the malevolent Eddy Funko, the player character travels across the "WonderWorlds"—levels based on settings and scenarios from different pop culture properties—completing missions, battling enemies, and collecting vinyl to manufacture new Pop!s and tools the player can use to progress through the game. Playable characters are equipped with both a melee weapon and a long-range weapon for use in combat and destroying objects in the surrounding environment. The player character can be swapped at Funko Pop! display boxes located throughout a level's map and in the game's hub world. The game includes various characters from different Universal Pictures films and television series, as well as characters from Invincible, Valve's Team Fortress 2, Capcom's Mega Man, Scott Cawthon's Five Nights at Freddy's, Colonel Sanders from KFC, and Big Boy from Big Boy Restaurants.

=== Intellectual properties ===
The game features characters from more than 20 properties, including those from Universal, Capcom, Valve, Mattel and Skybound Entertainment. Additional properties, characters, and costumes were added via downloadable content.

- Back to the Future
  - Marty McFly
  - Doc Brown
- Battlestar Galactica
  - Captain Apollo
  - Lieutenant Starbuck
  - Lieutenant Athena
  - Lieutenant Boomer
  - Cylon Centurion
- Big Boy
  - Big Boy
- Child's Play
  - Chucky
- Five Nights at Freddy's
  - Freddy Fazbear
  - Foxy
- Funko
  - Freddy Funko
  - Proto
  - Foxxo
  - Mecha Freddy
  - Eddy
- Hot Fuzz
  - Nicholas Angel
  - Danny Butterman
  - Doris Thatcher
  - Tony Fisher
  - Simon Skinner
- Invincible
  - Invincible
  - Omni-Man
  - Atom Eve (Note: Paid downloadable content)
  - Rex Splode
- Jaws
  - Martin Brody
  - Sam Quint
- Journey to the West
  - Sun Wukong (Note: Free downloadable content)
- The Joy of Painting
  - Bob Ross
- Jurassic World
  - Owen Grady
  - Claire Dearing
  - Barry Sembène
  - Kayla Watts
  - Dilophosaurus
  - John Hammond
  - Ian Malcolm
  - Zora Bennett
  - Spinosaurus
  - Dr. Henry Loomis
  - Velociraptor
- KFC
  - Colonel Sanders
- Knight Rider
  - Michael Knight
- Manchester City F.C.
  - Pep Guardiola
  - Erling Haaland
  - Phil Foden
  - Ederson
- Masters of the Universe
  - Prince Adam / He-Man
  - Teela
  - Man-At-Arms
  - Orko
  - Skeletor
  - Trap Jaw
- M3GAN
  - M3GAN
- Mega Man
  - Mega Man
  - Proto Man
  - Dr. Wily
- The Mummy
  - Rick O'Connell
  - Evelyn Carnahan
- Nope
  - OJ Haywood
  - Em Haywood
- The Office
  - Michael Scott
  - Dwight Schrute
  - Jim Halpert
  - Pam Beesly
- Scott Pilgrim vs. the World
  - Scott Pilgrim
    - NegaScott (skin)
  - Ramona Flowers
  - Knives Chau
  - Stephen Stills
  - Gideon Graves
  - Kim Pine
- Shaun of the Dead
  - Shaun
  - Ed
- SpecialEffect
  - Streamer Bear
- Team Fortress 2
  - Scout
  - Heavy
  - Engineer
  - Medic
- The Thing
  - R.J. MacReady
  - Childs
  - Nauls
  - M.T. Garry
  - Norwegian Thing
- The Umbrella Academy
  - Number Five
  - Allison
  - Diego
  - Klaus
  - Sir Reginald Hargreaves
  - Hazel
  - Cha-Cha
- Universal Classic Monsters
  - Frankenstein
  - Dracula
  - Wolf Man
  - Bride of Frankenstein
  - Invisible Man
- Voltron: Legendary Defender
  - Voltron
- The Walking Dead
  - Rick Grimes
  - Michonne Hawthorne
- Warrington Wolves
  - Wolfie
- Whale and Dolphin Conservation
  - Olivia
  - Olli
- Wicked
  - Elphaba
  - Glinda
  - Madame Morrible
  - The Wizard
  - Fiyero
- Xena: Warrior Princess
  - Xena

== Development ==
10:10 Games is a British video game development studio based in Warrington, United Kingdom. The company was co-founded by Jon Burton and Arthur Parsons in July 2021. Burton joined Parsons after leaving his position as creative director at Traveller's Tales in 2019. The company had joined Women in Games as their Corporate Ambassador in March 2022. Later that year, the company formed a partnership with Warrington and Vale Royal College. Design director and co-founder Arthur Parsons gave a live brief at the college in June 2024. The game is developed using Unreal Engine 5.

The development of a Funko video game was revealed by 10:10 Games and Funko. This was announced in July 2022 at San Diego Comic-Con. The game released on September 13, 2024.

== Reception ==
=== Critical reception ===
Funko Fusion received 54%, ie "mixed or average" reviews from critics, according to review aggregator website Metacritic. Fellow review aggregator OpenCritic assessed that the game received weak approval, being recommended by 15% of critics.

IGN gave the game a "bad" rating of 4 out of 10, stating: "Funko Fusion's dull combat and repetitive missions means that just like your Funko Pop collection, it's probably best left on the shelf."

=== Sales ===
Funko Fusion was a commercial failure, which led to layoffs at 10:10 Games.
