= Misha (name) =

- Pronunciation: Russian: [ˈmʲiʂə]
- Gender: Male (sometimes used for a female)

Origin
- Origin: Russia, Hebrew
- Meaning: "Who is like God?"

Other names
- Related names: Michael, Mikhail, Michal, Mischa, Micha, Míša

Misha (Миша) is a diminutive of the Russian name Mikhail (Михаил). A hypocoristic of Michael, its English-language equivalent would be Mike and Mick. It is sometimes used as a female name, mostly by non-Russians; the feminine Russian name Mikhaila exists but is rare. The spelling Mischa also exists, originating from German.

== People ==
- Misha (singer) (born 1975), Slovak R&B musician
- Misha (writer) (born 1955), American science fiction writer
- Misha Alperin (1956–2018), Ukrainian jazz musician
- Misha Asherov (1924–2003), Israeli actor, theatre director, and manager
- Misha Aster (born 1978), Canadian producer, director, writer and educator
- Mischa Auer (1905–1967), Russian-American actor
- Misha B (born 1992), British singer and X Factor 2011 finalist
- Mischa Barton (born 1986), British-American actress
- Mikhail Baryshnikov (born 1948), nicknamed "Misha", Russian dancer, choreographer and actor
- Sir Misha Black (1910–1977), British architect and designer
- Mikhail Botvinnik (1911–1995), Soviet and Russian chess grandmaster
- Misha Calvin, Serbian rock guitarist
- Misha Cirkunov (born 1987), Latvian-Canadian mixed martial artist
- Misha Collins (born 1974), American actor
- Misha Defonseca (born 1937), Belgian-born imposter
- Misha Dichter (born 1945), American pianist
- Mischa Elman (1891–1967), Russian-American violinist
- Misha Gabriel (born 1987), American dancer, choreographer, and actor
- Misha Ge (born 1991), Uzbekestani figure skater
- Meesha Ghoshal, Indian actress
- Misha Glenny (born 1958), British journalist and broadcaster
- Misha Green (born 1984), American screenwriter, director, and producer
- Misha Gromov (born 1943), Russian-French mathematician
- Misha Japanwala, Pakistani visual artist and fashion designer
- Misha Kahn (born 1989), American designer and sculptor
- Misha Kilmer, American applied mathematician
- Misha Kolganov (born 1974), Israeli Olympic medalist sprint kayaker, two-time world champion
- Mischa Levitzki (1898–1941), Russian-born U.S.-based concert pianist and composer
- Mischa Maisky (born 1948), Israeli cellist
- Misha Malyshev, Russian-American founder and CEO of Teza Group
- Misha Mengelberg (1935-2018), Dutch jazz pianist and composer
- Misha Mansoor (born 1984), American guitarist of progressive metal band Periphery
- Misha Marvin (born 1989), Ukrainian singer, composer and songwriter
- Misha Mengelberg (1935–2017), Dutch jazz pianist
- Misha Miller (born 1995), Moldovan singer
- Mykhailo Mudryk (born 2000), Ukrainian footballer
- Misha Nonoo, fashion designer
- Misha Novakhov (born 1975), American radio station founder and host, and member of the New York State Assembly
- Misha Omar, Malaysian singer
- Misha Osherovich, American actor, filmmaker, and activist
- Misha Rachlevsky (born 1946), Russian conductor
- Misha Radovic (born 1961), Serbian footballer and manager
- Misha Raitzin (1930–1990), Ukrainian tenor with the Metropolitan Opera
- Misha Reznikoff (1905–1971), American-Ukrainian artist
- Mikheil Saakashvili (born 1967), nicknamed "Misha", former President of Georgia
- Misha Sawdagor (born 1966), Bangladeshi film actor
- Misha Schubert (born 1973), Australian journalist
- Misha Segal (born 1943), Israeli film producer and composer
- Misha Shmerkin (born 1970) , Israeli competitive figure skater
- Mikhail Tal (1936–1992), Soviet-Latvian chess player
- Misha Timmins (born 1987), English actress
- Misha Tsodyks, theoretical and computational neuroscientist
- Misha Verbitsky (born 1969), Russian mathematician
- Misha Zilberman (born 1989), Israeli Olympic badminton player
- Mischa Zverev (born 1987), Russian-German tennis player

== Characters ==
- Misha, the mascot of the 1980 Olympic Games
- Misha (Pita-ten), a character from the anime and manga Pita-ten
- Misha Arsellec Lune, a character in the PlayStation 2 game Ar tonelico: Melody of Elemia
- Misha, a character from the visual novel Katawa Shoujo
- Misha Milanich, a character from the video game series Mercenaries
- Misha, a penguin from Andrey Kurkov's books Death and the Penguin and Penguin Lost
- Misha Milgrom, the main character of the book Milkweed by Jerry Spinelli
- Misha Miramond, a female character from the anime series Transformers: Energon
- Misha, the canonical first name of the Heavy Weapons Guy class in Team Fortress 2
- Misha, a male playable character from the game Honkai: Star Rail

== See also ==
- Misha (disambiguation)
