= Mikkjel =

Mikkjel is a given name. Notable people with the name include:

- Mikkjel Fønhus (1894–1973), Norwegian journalist, novelist, and short story writer
- Mikkjel Hemmestveit (1863–1957), Norwegian-American Nordic skier

== See also ==
- Mikkel
