= Mihailović =

Mihailović (Serbian: Михаиловић) is a Serbian surname, a patronymic derived from the masculine name Mihailo (Michael). There is also the spelling variant Mihajlović. Notable people with the surname include:

- Doksim Mihailović (1883–1912), military commander
- Dragoslav Mihailović (1930–2023), writer
- Draža Mihailović (1893–1946), military leader of Yugoslav resistance movement
- Đorđe Mihailović (1928–2023), cemetery keeper
- Konstantin Mihailović (1435–1500), soldier and memoirist
- Milorad Bata Mihailović (1923–2011), painter
- Radomir Mihailović (born 1950), guitarist
- Stevča Mihailović (1804–1888), politician
- Trifun Mihailović (born 1947), footballer
- Vladimir Mihailović (born 1990), basketball player
- Vojislav Mihailović (born 1951), politician
- Zoran Mihailović (born 1996), footballer
