= De Michele =

De Michele (alternatively DeMichele or De Michèle) is an Italian and French surname meaning "of Michele". People with the surname include:

- Dominick J. DeMichele (1916–2000), American engineer
- Gabriel De Michèle (born 1941), French footballer
- Graziella de Michele (born 1956), French singer
- Michael DeMichele, American poker player
