= Mihalis =

Mihalis (Μιχάλης Mikhális) is a Greek given name, equivalent to the English form Michael or the Spanish and Portuguese Miguel. It may refer to:

People:

- Mihalis Yacalos (or just Mihalis) (born 1996), Greek-Brazilian singer and songwriter
- Mihalis Filopoulos (1985–2007), Greek football fan who was murdered in 2007
- Mihalis Hatzigiannis (born 1979), Greek-Cypriot singer and songwriter
- Mihalis Papagiannakis (1941–2009), Greek politician
- Mihalis Yannakakis (born 1953), Greek professor at Columbia University
- Mihalis Safras (born 1996), Greek DJ

Other:

- "Mihalis", an instrumental song on David Gilmour's self-titled debut solo album.
