= Mijailo =

Mijailo (Cyrillic: Мијаило) is a South Slavic masculine given name cognate to Mihailo and Mihajlo.

Notable people with the name include:

- Mijailo Grušanović (born 1962), Serbian basketball player
- Mijailo Mijailović (born 1978), Swedish criminal of Serbian descent

== See also ==
- Mijailović
