= Maycon =

Maycon is a given name, a Brazilian variant of the name Michael. It may refer to:

- Maycon (footballer, born 1977), Andréia dos Santos, Brazilian women's football midfielder
- Maycon (footballer, born 1985), Maycon Vieira de Freitas, Brazilian football defensive midfielder
- Maycon (footballer, born 1986), Maycon Calvalho Inez, Brazilian football striker
- Maycon Calijuri (born 1986), Brazilian football forward
- Maycon (footballer, born 1994), Maycon Lucas Nogueira Mansano, Brazilian football midfielder
- Maycon Douglas (born 1996), Brazilian football forward
- Maycon (footballer, born 1997), Maycon de Andrade Barberan, Brazilian football midfielder
- Maycon (footballer, born 1998), Maycon Matheus do Nascimento, Brazilian football defender
- Maycon Cleiton (born 1998), Brazilian football goalkeeper

== See also ==
- Maicon
- Maykon (born 1985), Maykon Daniel Elias Araújo, Brazilian football midfielder
