= DiMichele =

DiMichele (or Di Michele in its original form) is a patronymic surname of Italian origin meaning "of Michele" (equivalent of Michael). Notable people with the surname include:

- Adam DiMichele (born 1985), American former football player
- Alicia DiMichele (born 1973), former star of U.S. reality show Mob Wives
- David Di Michele (born 1976), Italian football player
- Frank DiMichele (born 1965), American former baseball player
