= Michiels =

Michiels is a Dutch-language patronymic surname ("son of Michiel"). It may refer to:

- Alexis Michiels (1883–1976), French cyclist
- Andreas Victor Michiels (1797–1849), Dutch officer in the Dutch East Indies
- Baudouin Michiels (born 1941), Belgian businessman
- Diego Michiels (born 1990), Dutch-born Indonesian footballer
- Edgar Michiels van Verduynen (1885–1952), Dutch baron and politician
- Edmond Michiels (born 1913, date of death unknown), Belgian water polo player
- Githa Michiels (born 1983), Belgian cross-country cyclist
- Ignace Michiels (born 1963), Belgian organist and choral conductor
- Ivo Michiels (1923–2012), Belgian writer, pseudonym of Henri Ceuppens
- Oscar Michiels (1881–1946), Belgian military officer
- Paul Michiels (born 1948), Belgian singer and songwriter
- Stani Michiels (born 1973), Belgian visual artist and architect
- Yannick Michiels (born 1991), Belgian orienteer
