= Mihovil =

Mihovil is a Croatian given name. It is a variant of Michael. It may refer to

- Mihovil Logar (1902–1998), Serbian composer
- Mihovil Pavlek Miškina (1887–1942), Croatian writer and politician
- Mihovil Nakić (born 1955), Croatian basketball player
- Mihovil Pavlinović (1831–1887), Croatian politician
- Mihovil Španja (born 1984), Croatian paralympic swimmer
