= Korihait =

- Leagues: Korisliiga
- Founded: 1898; 128 years ago
- History: UU (1898-1994); Korihait (1994–present)
- Arena: Uusikaupunki Areena
- Capacity: 1,700
- Location: Uusikaupunki, Finland
- Team colors: Red, White
- Head coach: Ivan Ivanovic
- Championships: 1 Finnish Title; 2 Finnish Cups
- Retired numbers: 2 (12, 15)
- Website: www.korihait.fi
Home	Away

Korihait (English: Basket Sharks) is a Finnish basketball team from Uusikaupunki. It was formed as Uudenkaupungin Urheilijat, shortly UU, in 1898 and has won one Korisliiga Finnish Championship (1990) and two Finnish Cups (1986, 1988). In 1994 UU had a name competition for a new name. 'Korihait' then won the competition and took UU's place in the league.

Since 2025, the club plays at Uusikaupunki Areena. The arena finished construction in February 2025, and the first official game was played on the 5th of March 2025. The club previously played at Pohitulli Sports Hall, which has also hosted the Finland men's national handball team.

== Players ==
Korihait roster
Players
Coaches

Pos.	No.	Nat.	Name	Ht.	Wt.
F	6	(Finland)	Ahvenjärvi, Roni	1.97 m (6 ft 6 in)
G	7	(Bosnia and Herzegovina) (Finland)	Sarcevic, Bojan	1.90 m (6 ft 3 in)
G	8	(Finland)	Herrala, Joni	1.92 m (6 ft 4 in)
G	10	(Finland)	Tahvanainen, Ville	1.93 m (6 ft 4 in)
G	11	(Finland)	Eklund, Leo	1.93 m (6 ft 4 in)
G	13	(United States)	Harris, Jamir	1.88 m (6 ft 2 in)
C	16	(Finland) (Poland)	Laihonen, Mikael	2.02 m (6 ft 8 in)
C	20	(United States)	Champion, Frank	2.01 m (6 ft 7 in)
F	21	(United States)	Goracke, Brian	1.98 m (6 ft 6 in)
F	40	(United States)	Jackson, Jalen	1.98 m (6 ft 6 in)
C	50	(Finland)	Aalto, Mikael	2.08 m (6 ft 10 in)

Head coach

- (Serbia) Ivan Ivanovic

Assistant coach(es)

- (Finland) Valtteri Pihlajamäki

Legend

- (C) Team captain
- Injured

- Roster
Updated: April 28, 2026

Note: Flags indicate national team eligibility at FIBA-sanctioned events. Players may hold other non-FIBA nationalities not displayed.

== Notable players ==
Note: Flags indicate national team eligibility at FIBA-sanctioned events. Players may hold other non-FIBA nationalities not displayed.

Criteria

To appear in this section a player must have either:

- Set a club record or won an individual award while at the club
- Played at least one official international match for their national team at any time
- Played at least one official NBA match at any time.

- (Serbia) Ognjen Kuzmić
- (Finland) Elias Valtonen
- (Finland) Gerald Lee Jr.
- (United States) Chris Taft
- (United States) Daniel Horton
- (Canada) Gordon Herbert
- (United States) Shawn Vanzant
- (United States) Arizona Reid
