= Chell =

Chell may refer to:

- Chell, Staffordshire, an English community on the northern edge of Stoke-on-Trent
- Chell (Star Trek), a Star Trek: Voyager character
- Chell (Portal), the protagonist in the Portal video games
- CHemical cELL, in the context of bottom-up synthetic biology

== People ==
- Anna Chell (born 1997), English actress
- Carol Chell (born 1941), British children's television presenter
- Joseph Chell (1911–1992), British footballer

== See also ==
- Cheal (disambiguation)
