= Misha (disambiguation) =

Misha is the mascot of the 1980 Olympic Games.

Misha may also refer to:

- Misha (name), a given name and nickname, including a list of people and characters
- Misha (Pita-ten), character from the anime and manga Pita-ten
- Misha (Mandaeism), holy anointing oil used in Mandaeism
- Misha (singer) (born 1975), Slovak R&B musician
- Misha (woreda), Hadiya Zone, Ethiopia
- Misha, Yarkant County, Yarkant County, Kashgar Prefecture, Xinjiang, China (PRC)
- Misha: A Mémoire of the Holocaust Years, hoax Holocaust memoir
- Misha, a playable character in Honkai: Star Rail

== See also ==
- Mischa (disambiguation)
- Mishka (disambiguation)
- Myosha River, a river in Tatarstan, Russia
