= Pohitulli Sports Hall =

Basketball arena

Uusikaupunki Areena
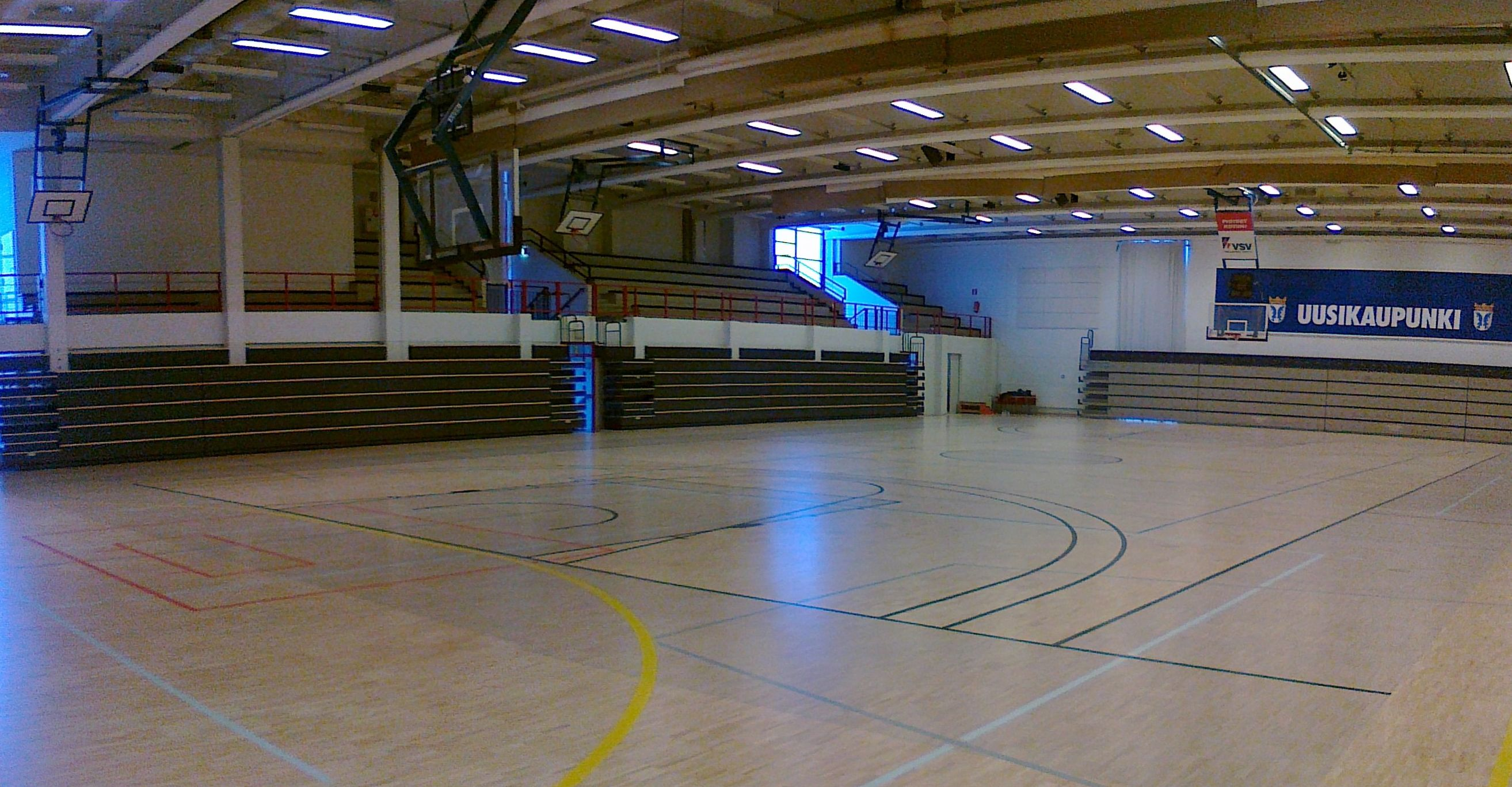
- Interactive map of Uusikaupunki Areena
- Full name: Uusikaupunki Areena
- Location: Uusikaupunki, Finland
- Coordinates: 60.804861°N 21.406028°E
- Owner: City of Uusikaupunki
- Capacity: Basketball: 1,627
- Surface: Parquet

Construction
- Opened: 1981
- Renovated: 2005-2009

Tenant
- Korihait

Uusikaupunki Areena (Finnish: Pohitullin palloiluhalli) is an indoor basketball sporting arena that is located in Uusikaupunki. It is currently home to the Korihait Finnish professional basketball team, which competes in the Korisliiga. It has also been the homecourt of Finland national basketball team for a couple of times.

The arena was opened in the year 1981 and has a seating capacity of 1,507 people. Record attendance is 2,500.
