= Mikhaylovsky (surname) =

Mikhaylovsky/Mikhailovsky (masculine) or Mikhaylovskaya (feminine) is a surname of Slavic origin. It is shared by the following people:

- Alexander Mikhailovsky-Danilevsky (1789–1848), Russian military figure
- Elena Mikhailovskaya (1949–1995), former World champion in international draughts
- Konstantin Mikhailovsky (1834–1909), Russian engineer
- Lyudmila Mikhaylovskaya (born 1937), Russian Olympian volleyball player
- Maksim Mikhailovsky (born 1969), Russian ice hockey player
- Nikita Mikhailovskii (born 2000), Russian basketball player
- Nikolai Garin-Mikhailovsky (1852–1906), Russian writer
- Nikolay Mikhaylovsky (1842–1904), Russian publicist, literary critic, and sociologist
- Renée O'Connell-Mikhailovskaya (1891–1981), Russian-English artist
- Stoyan Mikhaylovsky (1856–1927), Bulgarian writer
