= Mikel Huerga Leache =

Spanish chess grandmaster (born 1989)

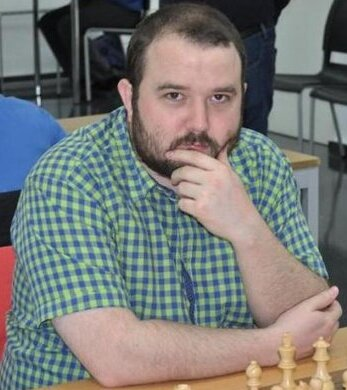

Personal information
- Born: December 22, 1989 (age 36) Pamplona, Spain

Chess career
- Country: Spain
- Title: Grandmaster (2022)
- Peak rating: 2503 (November 2021)

Mikel Huerga Leache is a Spanish chess grandmaster. He is the first grandmaster from Navarre.

== Chess career ==
He began playing chess at the age of 6, and won the U18 Spanish Junior Championship in 2007. He is coached by Jesús de la Villa.

He achieved the Grandmaster title in 2022 after surpassing the rating requirement in late 2021, after earning his norms at the:

- XXXIV Open Intl Ciudad de Sevilla in January 2009
- III Open Intl Ajedrez San Juan in August 2009
- Torneo Magistral Intl Elgoibar in December 2009
- LXXX CE Individual Absoluto in August 2015
- VII Cto. Iberoamericano Individual in August 2019

In August 2024, he tied for second place at the Ciudad de Oviedo Open with seven other players, prevailing over the field on tiebreak scores.
