= Mykhaylenko =

Mykhaylenko or Mykhailenko (Ukrainian: Михайленко) is a Ukrainian last name derived from the Ukrainian first name Mykhailo or Mykhaylo. Russian spelling: Mikhailenko or Mikhaylenko. It may refer to:

- Dmitry Mikhaylenko (footballer, born 1995), Russian football player
- Dmitry Mikhaylenko (footballer, born 2000), Russian football player
- Dmytro Mykhaylenko (born 1973), Soviet and Ukrainian football player and coach
- Mykola Mykhaylenko (born 2001), Ukrainian footballer
- Volodymyr Mykhailenko (born 1973), retired male decathlete from Ukraine
