= Miķelis =

- Pronunciation: [micelis]
- Gender: Male
- Name day: 29 September

Origin
- Origin: variant form of Michael
- Region of origin: Latvia

Miķelis is a Latvian male given name. It is also Latvian name of archangel Michael, therefore the celebration of autumn equinox is called Miķeļi in Latvian and Miķelis is named as protector of horses and good harvest, likely taking over functions of Jumis, a fertility deity in Latvian mythology.

Persons named Miķelis include:

- Miķelis Ežmalis (born 1990), Latvian canoer
- Miķelis Krogzemis (1850–1879), Latvian poet
- Miķelis Lībietis (born 1992), Latvian tennis player
- Miķelis Rēdlihs (born 1984), Latvian ice hockey player
- Miķelis Valters (1874–1968), Latvian politician
