= Mikkel Birkegaard =

Danish author of fantasy fiction

- Born: December 9, 1968 (age 57); Randers, Denmark
- Occupation: IT developer/Writer

Mikkel Birkegaard (born 12 September 1968 in Randers, Denmark) is a Danish author of fantasy fiction. He lives in Copenhagen, Denmark.

== Bibliography ==
- Libri di Luca (2007; English translation by Tiina Nunnally: The Library of Shadows, 2009). Danish national bestseller. Seventeen foreign-language editions are in print or preparation.
- Over mit lig (2009; English translation by Steven T. Murray: Over My Dead Body, 2011)
- La librairie des ombres in French, Edited by Fleuve noir
