= Medic (Team Fortress 2) =

- Team Fortress 2 character
- Medic wielding the default Medi Gun
- First appearance: Team Fortress 2; (2007)
- Based on: Combat Medic (Team Fortress Classic)
- Voiced by: Robin Atkin Downes

In-universe information
- Full name: Herbert Ludwig Humboldt
- Nickname: Doctor
- Occupation: Mad scientist
- Origin: Stuttgart, Germany
- Nationality: German

The Medic (full name Herbert Ludwig Humboldt) is a playable character in the team-based shooter game Team Fortress 2 (TF2) as one of its nine classes. He is portrayed as an uncompassionate mad scientist of German origin obsessed with human anatomy, implied to lack a medical license despite his role as a combat medic. Categorized in-game as one of the support classes, he plays the role of a reliable healer of the team, primarily using his Medi Gun for this task.

== Development history ==
The "Combat Medic" class was first introduced in the 1996 Quake mod Team Fortress, released in 1999 by Valve Corporation as the stand-alone game Team Fortress Classic (TFC). It was one of the five original classes of the mod as part of the Version 1 release. In the mod, the Combat Medic class is equipped with a shotgun, nailgun, grenades, a medikit for healing teammates, and a bioweapon which inflicts an infectious disease upon enemies. Uniquely among the classes, the Combat Medic is able to slowly regenerate health points automatically. In TFC, the Combat Medic can also equip the super shotgun and super nailgun. During the early development of the sequel, then subtitled "Brotherhood of Arms", the Combat Medic class was conceived as also carrying concussion grenades.

In the context of the overall shift towards more cartoony aesthetics that the sequel underwent during development, the Medic class was heavily redesigned. As described by TF2 designer Robin Walker in a 2006 interview for Computer Gaming World, the class was overhauled to allow the healing of teammates during combat and usefulness in both offensive and defensive situations. The bioweapon was scrapped during development, Walker saying that it sent the wrong signal that teammates "might hurt you" due to the disease. Rather than medikits, the Medic was updated to primarily heal via a gun emitting a healing beam whilst charging the "ÜberCharge" meter, which once full, granted temporary invincibility. The sequel's aesthetic redesign was unveiled by Valve in July 2006, and TF2 was released as part of The Orange Box in October 2007.

The first major content update for TF2 was released in April 2008 as the "Gold Rush Update", but became known as the "Medic Update" among fans due to the addition of three new weapons for the Medic. George Ash of Game Informer later said that this update "changed the way the medic class could be played". This was the first of TF2's individual class updates. The first in-game cosmetic for the Medic was the "Prussian Pickelhaube" as part of a May 2009 update. In June 2011, Valve introduced the "Über Update", which despite its name was not solely focused on the Medic. Billed as the "biggest, most ambitious update" to the game in its history, the five days of the update culminated in the release of "Meet the Medic", a short animated film from the "Meet the Team" series. Arriving alongside the Medic's part of the "Über Update", the short depicts the Medic's gruesome character and the canonical origin of the ÜberCharge. In-game, the Medic's part of the update added a further three weapons to the class.

== Story and character ==
The Medic is depicted in TF2 as a maniacal scientist with a morbid interest in human anatomy, considering healing a mere side effect of his experiments on his fellow mercenaries. Despite this, he shows a softer side towards his pet doves. Voice acted by Robin Atkin Downes, the Medic speaks in an exaggerated German accent. The TF2 character description for the Medic states that he was "raised in Stuttgart, Germany", while the second update announcement for the "Two Cities Update" names the fictional "vaguely European" city of Rottenburg as his hometown. Despite being called a doctor by his teammates, he is implied to lack a medical license, and according to his character description "any sort of verifiable formal training in medicine". Using the D&D alignment chart, Kieron Gillen of Rock Paper Shotgun classified the Medic as lawful good.

== Gameplay ==
The Medic is categorized in the game as one of the support classes, alongside the Spy and Sniper. The Medic carries a Syringe Gun as a primary weapon, a Medi Gun as a secondary weapon, and a bone saw as a melee weapon. As a healer, he is the only class which can reliably heal other teammates. His primary tool in this task is the Medi Gun, which tethers a flexible beam of light to a teammate to heal them. The Medi Gun heals targets lower health points faster than those with more, and can also "overheal" targets up to 150% of the default maximum health. The default Medi Gun has an associated "ÜberCharge" meter filled by healing. Once full, it can be activated to grant a few seconds of invincibility to the Medic and their healing target. The Medic can otherwise equip alternatives to the default Medi Gun which do not have ÜberCharge. Such Medi Guns include the Kritzkrieg, (Note: Although it is spelled in-game as "Kritzkrieg", reports from 2008 spelled it as "Critzcrieg") which replaces the period of invincibility with a period of guaranteed critical hits. Another is the Quick-Fix, which heals 40% faster than other Medi Guns while downgrading overheal, and replaces the ÜberCharge with a period of increased healing power.

The Medic's Syringe Gun deals little damage as a weapon and as such makes the class largely ineffective on its own. The default Syringe Gun can be swapped out for the Blutsauger syringe gun, which heals the player upon shooting an enemy. Another replacement for the syringe gun is the Crusader's Crossbow, a crossbow which fires bolts that heal teammates and damage enemies. In Medieval Mode, equipping the crossbow can allow a more alternative play style entirely, known as "Battle Medic". The Medic's melee weapon is an ordinary bone saw. This can be swapped out for an Übersaw, a more sluggish weapon which adds 25% to the ÜberCharge meter upon hitting an enemy.

The Medic is the only class in the game who can regenerate health independently of his chosen weapons. Teammates can call for a Medic to assist them by pressing the E key on PC, which plays a voice line yelling out his name. The class pairs well with high damage classes such as the Demoman, Soldier, and especially the Heavy.

== Reception ==
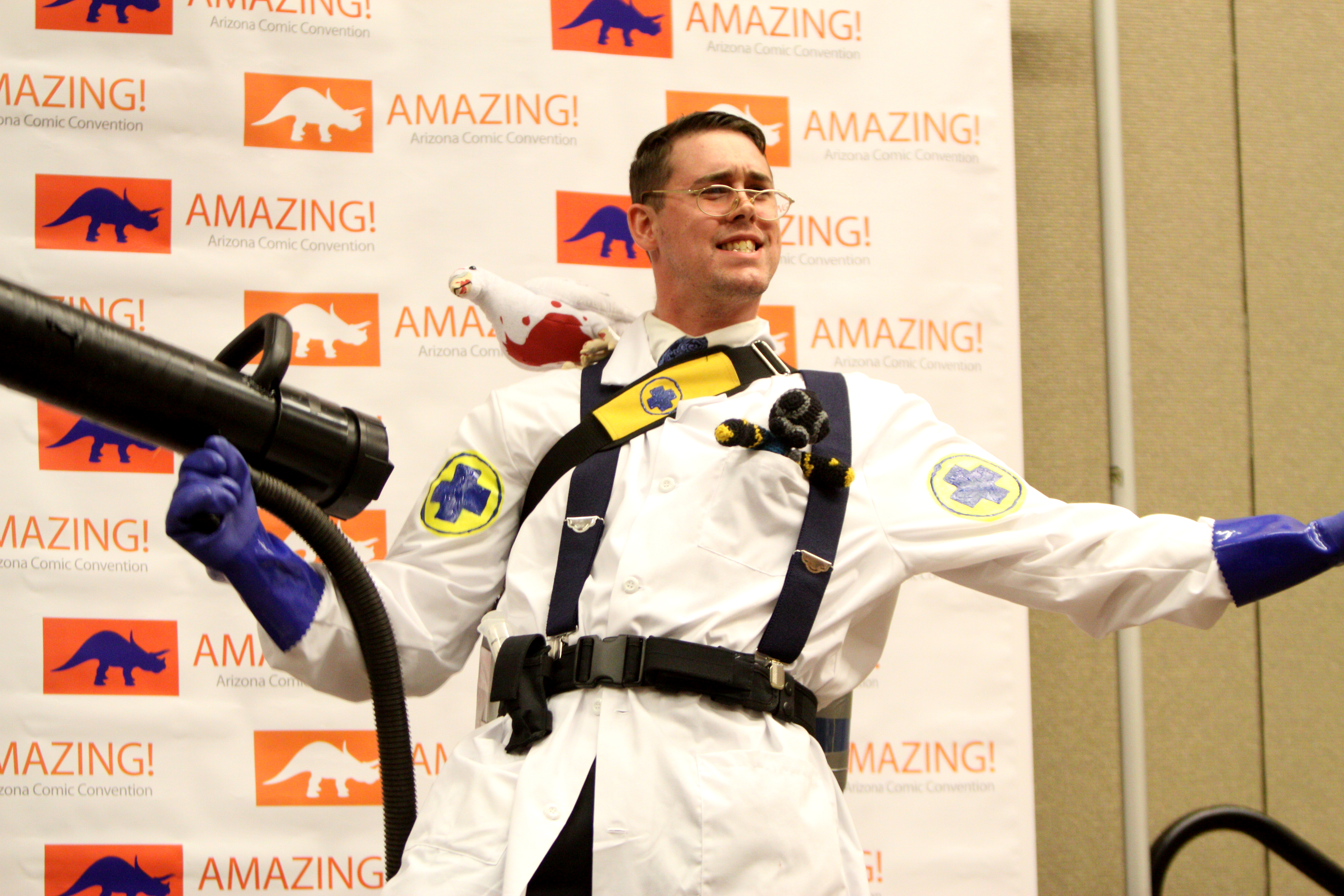
Cosplay of the Medic with pet dove Archimedes

The Medic has been named one of gaming's most iconic healers by Sid Natividad of Game Rant, and among "gaming's most magnificently murderous medical practitioners" by David Houghton of GamesRadar+. Blaine Polhamus of Dot Esports ranked him the third best character of TF2, emphasizing the indispensability of his support to the team. For this reason, esports researchers Smith et al. noted that killing the enemy Medic above other characters is often seen by players as a primary objective in the game. Due to his nature as an observer to combat, he has been recommended for newer players to TF2 to help understand the game's mechanics, layouts, and matchups. Gillen defined the central element of the Medic to be trust, "in that you, to be most devastating, have to put your trust in another player." Within the TF2 fandom, the Medic is often jokingly interpreted to be in a romantic relationship with Heavy. In Samuel Horti's review of Overwatch (2016) for PCGamesN, he compared the Medic—his favorite class—to Overwatch's comparable healer character Mercy. He noted a similarity in the healing beam and movement mechanics of both characters, but stated that Mercy was more vulnerable to the flanking characters of the game.

== Appearances in other media ==
In a level added in a free update to Surgeon Simulator (2013), the Medic can be played as a surgeon operating on the Heavy. A 2014 episode of the animated series Robot Chicken parodied calls for the Medic in TF2.
