= Mihails Smorodins =

Russian footballer

Mihails Smorodins (eng. Mikhail Smorodin, рус. Михаил Смородин, born 1952 in Saldus) is a former Latvian football striker, one of the best goalscorers in the history of the Latvian league.

== Playing career ==
Smorodins was the best goalscorer in the Latvian league for four consecutive seasons in mid 1970s when playing with Starts Brocēni (78 goals in four seasons). Only after such a performance he caught the attention of Daugava Rīga scouting and was invited to the masters team. In Daugava he played for four seasons in which he scored 101 goal, in 1979—43 goals. In 1981, he played with FC Fakel Voronezh in the first Soviet league and scored 8 goals in 30 matches.

After return from Voronezh Smorodins played with Rīgas audums, then he switched to referee work and was one of the top referees in the Latvian league.
