= Michelsen =

Michelsen is a Danish-Norwegian patronymic surname meaning "son of Mikkel/Michael". There are related English, German, Swedish and other spellings of this name. People with the name Michelsen include:

== People ==
- Albert Michelsen (1893–1964), American marathon runner
- Alex Michelsen (born 2004), American tennis player
- Alfonso López Michelsen (1913–2007), Colombian politician, lawyer and journalist
- Anders Michelsen, Norwegian football player
- Andreas Michelsen (1869–1932), German admiral
- Anne Dorte Michelsen, Danish singer and composer
- Charis Michelsen, American actress and model
- Christian Michelsen (1857–1925), Norwegian shipping magnate and statesman
- Christian Michelsen (footballer), Norwegian footballer
- Hans Methlie Michelsen, Norwegian judge
- Jacob Andreas Michelsen (1821–1902), Norwegian businessperson and politician
- Lars-Henrik Paarup Michelsen, Norwegian politician
- Randi Michelsen (1903–1981), Danish film actress
- Stacey Michelsen (born 1991), New Zealand field hockey player
- Thomas Michelsen, Norwegian football player
- Thore Michelsen (1888–1980), Norwegian rower

== Other ==
- Michelsen Farmstead, Canadian Provincial Historic Site
- Michelsen Island, South Orkney Islands, Antarctica
- Michelsen's Cabinet, Norwegian coalition cabinet, which governed Norway between 1905 and 1907
