= Mikkel Warming =

Danish politician

Mikkel Warming (born 15 May 1969) has been the mayor of the Social Affairs Committee in Copenhagen since 2005, and has been a member of the city council since 1994. He was a member of the Socialist People's Party until 1996, when he changed to the Red-Green Alliance.
