= Budimir =

Budimir (Cyrillic: Будимир, Polish language : Budzimir) may refer to:

== Masculine given name of Slavic origin ==
- Budimir Đukić (born 1977), Serbian footballer
- Budimir Janošević (born 1989), Serbian football goalkeeper
- Budimir Jolović (born 1959), Macedonian-Serbian basketball player
- Budimir Lončar (1924–2024), Yugoslav and Croatian politician
- Budimir Metalnikov (1925–2005), Russian screenwriter and film director
- Budimir Šegrt (born 1956), Montenegrin doctor and politician
- Budimir Vujačić (born 1964), Montenegrin footballer

== Surname ==
- Andrijana Budimir, Macedonian handball player
- Ante Budimir (born 1991), Croatian footballer
- Dennis Budimir (1938–2023), American musician
- Marijan Budimir (born 1980), Croatian footballer
- Mario Budimir (born 1986), Croatian footballer
- Milan Budimir (1891–1975), Serbian professor
- Živko Budimir (born 1962), politician from Bosnia and Herzegovina

== Human settlement ==
- Budimiri, a village near Trilj, Croatia

== See also ==
- Budimirci
