= Machiel van Keulen =

Dutch footballer

Personal information
- Date of birth: 1984 or 1985 (age 41–42)
- Positions: Midfielder; utility player

Team information
- Current team: Hulzense Boys

Youth career
- 1999–2003: Heracles Almelo

Senior career*
Years	Team	Apps	(Gls)
2003–2005	Heracles Almelo	2	(0)
2005–2016	SVZW		
2016–	Hulzense Boys		
- * Club domestic league appearances and goals as of 19:59, 15 October 2016 (UTC)

Machiel van Keulen (born 1984/1985) is a Dutch former professional footballer. Although primarily a midfielder, he was able to play in multiple positions.

== Career ==
Van Keulen began his career with Heracles Almelo, spending six years with the club, including two years with the first-team. For Heracles he made two appearances in the Eerste Divisie and two appearances in the KNVB Cup. After eleven seasons with SVZW, he signed for Hulzense Boys for the 2016–17 season.
