= Miika =

Miika is a Finnish masculine given name. Notable people with the name include:

- Miika Elomo (1977–2025), Finnish ice hockey player
- Miika Koivisto (born 1990), Finnish ice hockey player
- Miika Koppinen (born 1978), Finnish football defender
- Miika Tenkula (1974–2009), Finnish heavy metal musician
- Miika Wiikman (born 1984), Finnish ice hockey goaltender
