= Misho (disambiguation) =

Misho (born 1984) is an Armenian rapper.

Misho may also refer to:

- Mishō, Ehime, Japan
  - Seiryū-Shin-Iwakuni Station, originally Mishō Station, a railway station
- Misho Shamara, or Big Sha, Mihail Stanislavov Mihaylov (born 1972), Bulgarian rapper

== See also ==
- Names of which Misho can be a shortened form in some Slavic languages:
  - Mihail
  - Mihael
  - Miroslav (given name)
  - Dimitar
