= Mykhailo =

Mykhailo or Mykhaylo (Ukrainian: Михайло, pronounced [mɪˈxɑjlo]) is a Ukrainian masculine given name, equivalent to English Michael. Notable people with the name include:

- Mykhaylo Berkos (1861–1919), Russian and Ukraine artist of Greek origin
- Mykhailo Bolotskykh (born 1960), Ukrainian statesman and military serviceman, Colonel General (Civil Defense Service)
- Mykhailo Brodskyy (born 1959), Ukrainian politician, leader of the Party of Free Democrats and businessman
- Mykhaylo Chemberzhi, Ukrainian composer, teacher, scientist and statesman
- Mykhaylo Chornyi (1933–2020), Ukrainian Realist, Neo-Primitivist painter and graphic artist
- Mykhaylo Denysov (born 1985), Ukrainian footballer
- Mykhailo Drahomanov (1841–1895), Ukrainian political theorist, economist, historian, philosopher, ethnographer and public figure in Kyiv
- Mykhailo Drapatyi (born 1982), commander-in-chief of the Armed Forces of Ukraine since July 2026
- Mykhailo Dunets (born 1950), coach of Soviet Union and Ukraine
- Mykhaylo Dyachuk-Stavytskyi (born 1989), Ukrainian footballer
- Mykhaylo Fomenko (1948–2024), Ukrainian football manager and former player
- Mykhaylo Forkash (1948–2011), Ukrainian and Soviet footballer
- Mykhailo Havryliuk (born 1979), Ukrainian public figure
- Mykhailo Horyn (1930–2013), Ukrainian human rights activist and dissident
- Mykhailo Hrushevsky (1866–1934), Ukrainian academician, politician, historian, and statesman, important figure of the Ukrainian national revival
- Mykhaylo Ishchenko (born 1950), retired Soviet handball goalkeeper who competed in the 1972, 1976 and 1980 Summer Olympics
- Mykhaylo Khmelko (1919–1996), Ukrainian painter, People's Artist of the Ukrainian SSR, and double Stalin prize winner
- Mykhailo Khoma (born 1983), Ukrainian singer
- Mykhaylo Koman (1928–2015), Ukrainian footballer and manager
- Mykhaylo Kononenko (born 1987), Ukrainian professional road cyclist who rides for the Kolss BDC Team
- Mykhaylo Kopolovets (born 1984), Ukrainian footballer
- Mykhailo Kotsiubynsky (1864–1913), Ukrainian impressionist and modernist author
- Mykhailo Koval, Colonel General of Ukraine who until 2014 worked in the State Border Guard Service of Ukraine
- Mykhaylo Kozak (born 1991), Ukrainian footballer
- Mykhailo Krasniuk (born 2001), Ukrainian fencer
- Mykhailo Lebiha, Ukrainian blogger and streamer
- Mykhailo Levytsky (1774–1858), Metropolitan Archbishop of the Ukrainian Greek Catholic Church from 1816 until his death
- Mykhaylo Luchnik, Ukrainian sprint canoeist who competed in the late 1990s and early 2000s
- Mykhailo Maksymovych (1804–1873), Ukrainian and Russian professor of botany, historian and writer of a Ukrainian Cossack background
- Mykhailo Mudryk (born 2001), Ukrainian footballer
- Mykhaylo Mykhalyna (1924–1998), Czech, Hungarian, Ukrainian and Soviet professional footballer and manager
- Mykhaylo Mykhaylov (born 1959), Ukrainian football coach and former player
- Mykhaylo Okhendovsky (born 1973) Ukrainian lawyer and Chairman of the Central Election Commission of Ukraine
- Mykhaylo Olefirenko (born 1960), Ukrainian football manager and former player
- Mykhaylo Osadchy (1936–1994), Ukrainian journalist, poet, writer, and dissident
- Mykhaylo Plokhotnyuk (born 1999), Ukrainian footballer
- Mykhaylo Pysko (born 1993), Ukrainian footballer
- Mykhaylo Renzhyn (born 1978), Israeli Alpine skier
- Mykhailo Reznik (1950–2025), Ukrainian diplomat
- Mykhaylo Ryashko (born 1996), Ukrainian footballer
- Mykhaylo Semenko, Ukrainian poet, the prominent representative of the Ukrainian futuristic poetry of 1920s
- Mykhaylo Serhiychuk (born 1991), Ukrainian footballer
- Mykhaylo Sokolovskyi (born 1951), Ukrainian football manager and former player
- Mykhaylo Starostyak (born 1973), Ukrainian footballer
- Mykhailo Starytsky (1840–1904), Ukrainian writer, poet, and playwright
- Mykhailo Stelmakh (1912–1983), Ukrainian novelist, poet, and playwright
- Mykhaylo Stelmakh (footballer) (born 1966), Ukrainian football manager and former player
- Mykhaylo Svystovych (born 1968), Ukrainian social activist, member of "Vidsich" civil movement, editor of "Maidan" magazine and economist
- Mykhailo Verbytsky (1815–1870), Ukrainian Greek Catholic priest and composer
- Mykhaylo Yakubovych (born 1986), Ukrainian Arabist, translator and scholar of Islamic Studies
- Mykhaylo Zagirnyak, Ukrainian scientist (electromechanics), Rector of Kremenchuk Mykhailo Ostrohradskyi National

== See also ==
- Mykhaylenko
- ,
- ,
