= Graziella de Michele =

- Birth name: Graziella de Michele
- Born: 28 December 1956 (age 68); Lyon, France
- Genres: Pop music
- Occupation(s): Singer, songwriter
- Years active: 1985–

Graziella de Michele (born 28 December 1956) is a French singer-songwriter of Italian descent. She is famous for her 1987 single "Le Pull-over blanc" ("The White Sweater"), which was a top-three hit on the SNEP singles chart and achieved Silver status.

In the early 1980s, De Michele followed her musical idols, Ramones and Talking Heads, around Europe before ending up stranded in London. She returned to France and worked as a nurse until she achieved success with "Le Pull-over blanc."

The song was first covered by Arno Hintjens in 1990, then by Alexandre Balduzzi and Nolwenn Leroy of Star Academy on the Fait sa Boum album in 2003.

De Michele's next singles passed unnoticed and therefore the singer can be considered as a one-hit wonder.

== Discography ==
=== Albums ===
- 1989 : Le Clown d'Alicante
- 1994 : Les Terres mouillées

=== Singles ===
- 1985 : "Let's Fall in Love"
- 1986 : "Le Pull-over blanc" – No. 3 in France, Silver disc
- 1987 : "Cathy prend le train"
- 1989 : "La Lettre de Jersay"
- 1989 : "Barcelone"
- 1993 : "Vision d'Amsterdam"
- 1994 : "17 ans"
- 1994 : "Le jeune homme de Berlin"

=== Collaborations ===
- 1985 : cover of Velvet Underground's "Sweet Jane" on the compilation Les Enfants du Velvet
- 1990 : cover of Téléphone's "New York avec toi" on the album Diversion, release for the ten years of Virgin France
- 1995 : "Ce garçon qui s'en va", dedicated to Cleews Vellay (lyrics : Lionel Florence, music : Guy Delacroix), on the album Entre sourire et larmes (Squatt / Sony Music), released to raise funds against AIDS
- 1997 : about ten cover versions on the series of Atlas compilations Les Plus Belles Chansons Françaises, including "Message Personnel", originally recorded by Françoise Hardy
