= Mícheál Lally =

Irish writer and historian

- Born: 1939 (age 86–87); Ireland
- Occupations: Writer and historian
- Known for: The Tan War; Ballyovey, South Mayo

Mícheál Lally (born 1939), is an Irish writer and historian.

A native of Fairhill in the Claddagh area in Ireland, Lally has been a seminarian, shopkeeper, publican, and a voluntary worker with the Brothers of Charity. He has published a book, The Tan War; Ballyovey, South Mayo, the product of ten years' painstaking research instigated by the last wish of his father, Tom, that the events of the War of Independence and subsequent Irish Civil War in South Mayo be recorded.
