= Return Point =

Headland of Antarctica

Coordinates: 60°38′S 46°1′W

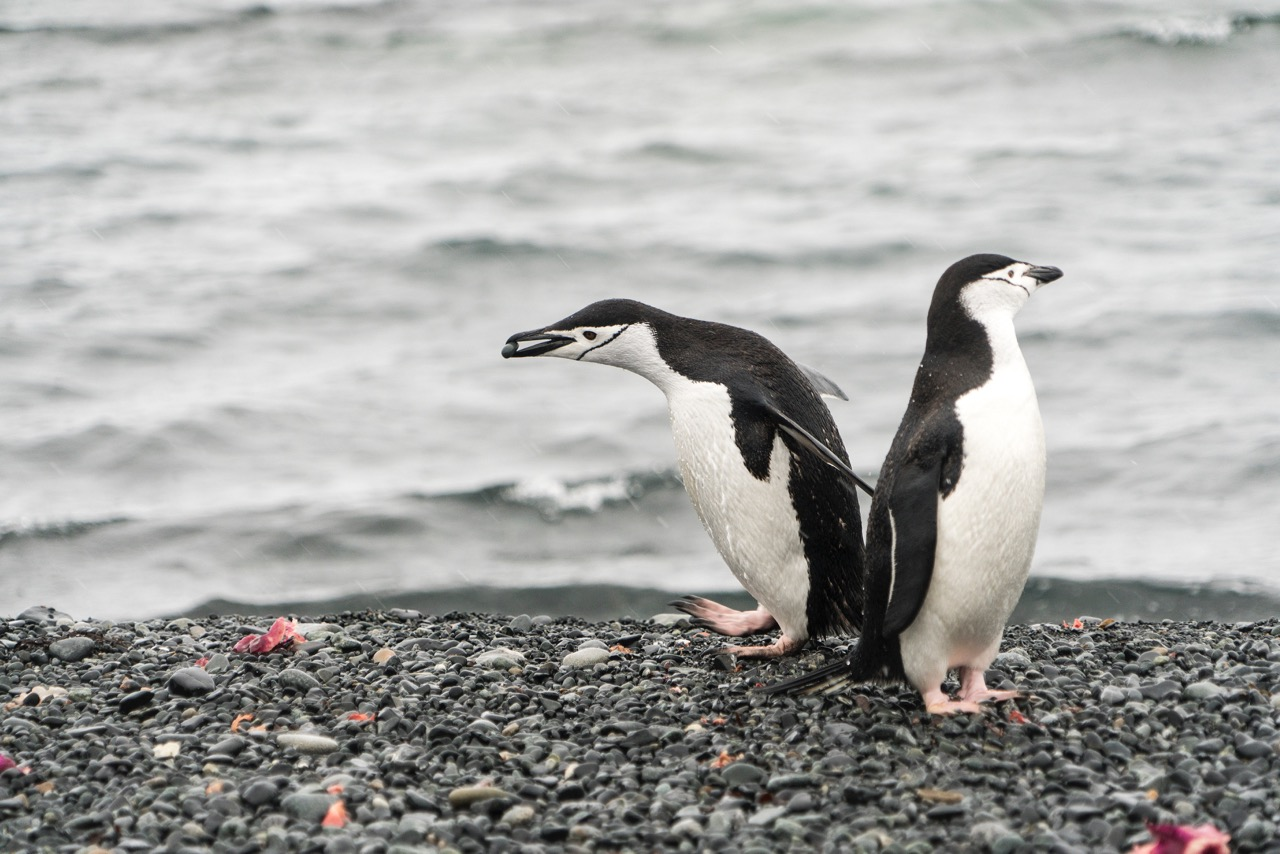
Chinstrap penguins breed in the IBA

Return Point is a rocky slope forming the south-west extremity of Coronation Island, in the South Orkney Islands of Antarctica. It lies 2 km west-north-west of Cheal Point.

== History ==
The point was discovered on 7 December 1821 by Captain George Powell, British sealer in the sloop Dove, and Captain Nathaniel Palmer, American sealer in the sloop James Monroe. It was named by Powell who, after making a landing on this point of land, returned directly aboard ship after viewing the coast to the eastward.

== Important Bird Area ==
A 194 ha tract of land, including both Return Point and Cheal Point, has been identified as an Important Bird Area (IBA) by BirdLife International because it supports a large breeding colony of about 38,000 pairs of chinstrap penguins which nest on places which are free of ice cover.
