= Maicon dos Santos =

Brazilian footballer

Personal information
- Date of birth: 18 September 1981 (age 45)
- Place of birth: Rio do Sul, Brazil
- Height: 1.70 m (5 ft 7 in)
- Position: Midfielder

Senior career*
Years	Team	Apps	(Gls)
200?–2003	Metropolitano		
2003–2004	FC Lustenau 07		
2004–2007	FK Austria Wien	19	(1)
2007	Clube Esportivo		
2008	Metropolitano	0	(0)
2008	Joinville	0	(0)
2008	→ Juventus (SC) (loan)	0	(0)
2009	Lustenau		
2009	Metropolitano	0	(0)
2010	Uberlândia	0	(0)
2010–2011	Marcílio Dias	4	(0)
2011	Brusque	2	(0)
2011	Atlético Ibirama	0	(0)
- * Club domestic league appearances and goals

Maicon dos Santos (born 18 September 1981) is a Brazilian footballer who plays as a midfielder for Uberlândia Esporte Clube.

== Career ==
He previously played for Austria Vienna, for whom he made 3 appearances in the 2006–07 UEFA Cup, one as starter.

He was released at the end of the 2006–07 season, and signed a contract on 3 September 2007 until the end of 2007 for Clube Esportivo.

In December 2007, he signed a one-year deal with Metropolitano. In May 2008, he signed a new deal which last until December 2011. In September 2008, he joined Joinville and loaned to Grêmio Esportivo Juventus.

In February 2009 he joined Lustenau.
