= Mikael Laihonen =

Finnish-Polish basketball player (born 1994)

Korihait
- Position: Center
- League: Korisliiga

Personal information
- Born: 6 April 1994 (age 32) Uusikaupunki, Finland
- Listed height: 2.02 m (6 ft 8 in)
- Listed weight: 109 kg (240 lb)

Career information
- Playing career: 2012–present

Career history
- 2012–2018: Turun NMKY
- 2018–2021: Kauhajoki Karhu
- 2021–2022: Kataja
- 2022–2023: BC Nokia
- 2023–2024: Rosa Radom
- 2024–2025: Miasto Szkła Krosno
- 2025–present: Korihait

Career highlights
- Finnish Korisliiga champion (2019); Polish I Liga champion (2025)

Mikael Laihonen (born 6 April 1994) is a Finnish professional basketball player who plays as a center for Korisliiga team Korihait.

== Professional career ==
After starting his career with Turun NMKY, Laihonen played for Korisliiga team Kauhajoki Karhu Basket from 2018 until 2021. They won the Finnish championship in 2019.

He continued his career with Kataja and played for BC Nokia in the 2022–23 season.

During the next two years, Laihonen played in Poland for Hydrotruck Radom and Miasto Szkła Krosno. At the end of the 2024–25 season, Laihonen won the Polish I Liga championship with Krosno and they were promoted to PLK.

In June 2025, he returned to Korisliiga and signed with Korihait in Uusikaupunki, the city where he was born.

== Personal life ==
Laihonen is of Polish descent on his mother's side. He holds a dual citizenship of Finland and Poland. He is married to Finnish professional footballer Ria Laihonen.
