= Mikkel =

Mikkel is a Danish boy given name, equivalent of the English name Michael. It may refer to:

- Mikkel Ødelien (1893–1984), Norwegian soil researcher
- Mikkel Aaland (born 1952), award-winning American photographer
- Mikkel Andersen (disambiguation)
- Mikkel Bødker (born 1989), Danish ice hockey right winger
- Mikkel Beck (born 1973), Danish former football player
- Mikkel Beckmann (born 1983), Danish professional football winger
- Mikkel Birkegaard, Danish author of fantasy fiction
- Mikkel Bischoff (born 1982), Danish professional footballer of Kenyan descent
- Mikkel Borch-Jacobsen (born 1951), Professor of Comparative Literature and French at the University of Washington in Seattle
- Mikkel Christoffersen (born 1983), Danish professional association football player
- Mikkel Damsgaard (born 2000), Danish footballer
- Mikkel Diskerud (born 1990), Norwegian-born American association football midfielder
- Mikkel Frandsen (1892–1981), Danish American physical chemist
- Mikkel Frost (born 1971), Danish architect
- Mikkel Hansen (born 1987), Danish handballer
- Mikkel Hindhede (1862–1945), Danish physician and nutritionist
- Mikkel Jensen (footballer born 1977) (born 1977), Danish football (soccer) player in the central midfielder position
- Mikkel Johannesen Borge (1791–1844), Norwegian politician
- Mikkel Kessler (born 1979), retired Danish professional boxer
- Mikkel Lomborg (born 1971), Danish children's television presenter
- Mikkel Mikkelsen, Fiscal and Governor-General ad interim of St. Thomas in the Danish West Indies, from 27 February 1686 to 29 June 1686
- Mikkel Parlo (born 1990), Danish mixed martial artist
- Mikkel Poulsen (born 1984), internationally elite curler from Denmark
- Mikkel Rønnow (born 1974), Musical Director, Musical Theatre Performance Coach and Theatrical Producer
- Mikkel Rask (born 1983), Danish professional football (soccer) player
- Mikkel Thygesen (born 1984), Danish professional footballer
- Mikkel Vendelbo (born 1987), Danish professional football midfielder
- Mikkel Warming (born 1969), the mayor of the social area in Copenhagen since 2005
- Tor Mikkel Wara (born 1964), former Norwegian politician

== Fictional characters ==
- Mikkel Nielsen, a character from the German Netflix series Dark

== See also ==
- Michael
- Mikkel Museum, art museum in Tallinn, Estonia
