= Mikko =

Mikko is a Finnish masculine given name and equivalent of the English name Michael, having been borrowed into the Finnic languages. The given name Mikko is shared by the following notable people:

- Mikko Alatalo, Finnish musician and politician
- Mikko Eloranta, Finnish ice hockey left winger
- Mikko Franck, Finnish conductor
- Mikko Heiniö, Finnish composer
- Mikko Hirvonen, Finnish World Rally Championship driver
- Mikko Hyppönen, Finnish security guru and author
- Mikko Ilonen, Finnish golfer
- Mikko Juva, Finnish historian, theologian, and archbishop
- Mikko Kavén, Finnish footballer
- Mikko Koivu, Finnish ice hockey centre
- Mikko Kolehmainen, Finnish flatwater canoer
- Mikko Korhonen, Finnish golfer
- Mikko Koskinen, Finnish ice hockey goaltender
- Mikko Larkas, Finnish basketball coach
- Mikko Leppilampi, Finnish actor and musician
- Mikko Lindström, guitarist for Finnish band HIM
- Mikko Nissinen, Finnish ballet dancer and current director of Boston Ballet
- Mikko Paananen, bassist for the Finnish band HIM
- Mikko Rantanen, Finnish ice hockey forward
- Mikko Ruutu, Finnish ice hockey forward
- Mikko Sirén, drummer of Finnish band Apocalyptica
- Mikko Tuomi, Finnish astronomer
- Mikko Vainonen, Finnish ice hockey defenceman

Mikko is also the name of these other entities:

- Mikko (restaurant), a Nordic restaurant in Washington, D.C.
