= Mihailo =

- Pronunciation: \mi-hail\o
- Gender: Male

Origin
- Origin: Hebrew: מִיכָאֵל / מיכאל (mee-KHA-el)
- Meaning: "Who is like God"

Other names
- Related names: Variants: Michael, Mihail, Mikhail; Nicknames (diminutives): Miha, Miki, Mića, Miča, Miša, Mišo

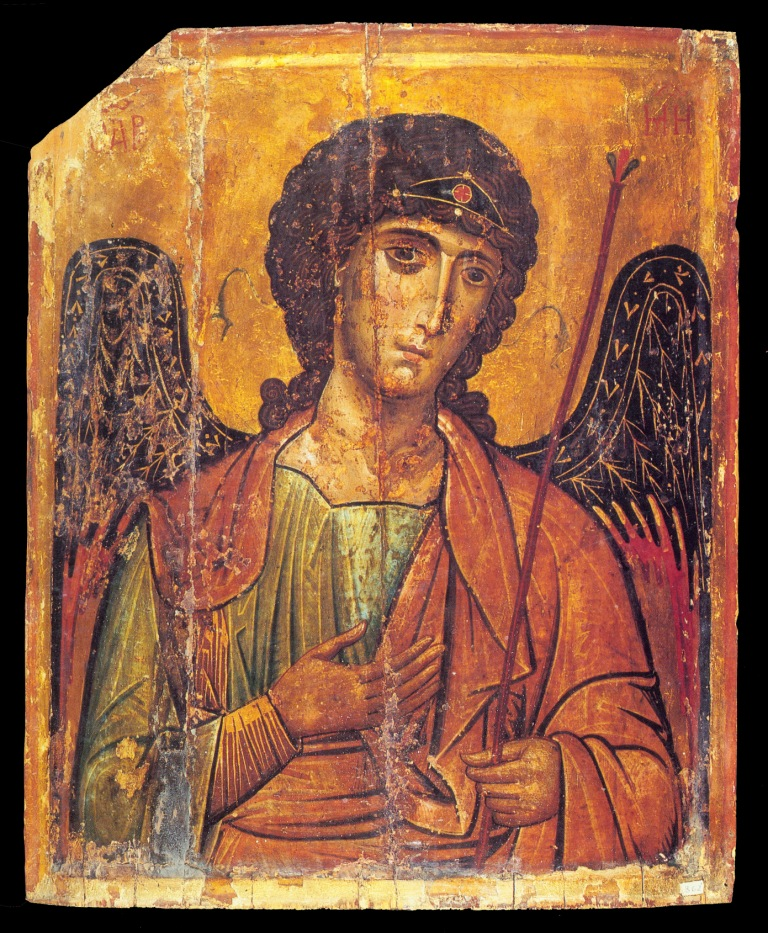
Michael the Archangel. A 13th-century Byzantine icon from the Monastery of St. Catherine, Sinai.

Mihailo (Serbian Cyrillic: Михаило) (''\mi-hail\o'') is a South Slavic masculine given name. It is a variant of the Hebrew name Michael, and its cognates include Mihajlo and Mijailo. Common as a given name among Serbs, it is an uncommon surname.

Notable people with the name include:

- Mihailo Vojislavljević (fl. 1050–d. 1081), King of Duklja
- Mihailo Ovčarević (fl. 1550–79), Habsburg Serb commander
- Mihailo Đurić (1925–2011), Serbian philosopher, retired professor, and academic
- Mihailo Janković (d. 1976), Serbian architect
- Mihailo Lalić (1914–1992), Montenegrin and Serbian novelist
- Mihailo Marković (1927-2010), Serbian philosopher
- Mihailo Merćep (1864–1937), Serb flight pioneer
- Mihailo Obrenović (1823–1868), Prince of Serbia
- Mihailo Petrović Alas (1868–1943), Serbian mathematician and inventor
- Mihailo Vukdragović (1900–1967), Serbian composer and conductor
- Miraš Dedeić or Metropolitan Mihailo (b. 1938), former head of the uncanonical Montenegrin Orthodox Church
- Mihailo Tolotos (1855/1856-1938), Greek monk who lived 82 years not seeing a woman

== See also ==
- Mihailović
