= Cheal Point =

Headland of Antarctica

Coordinates: 60°38′S 45°59′W

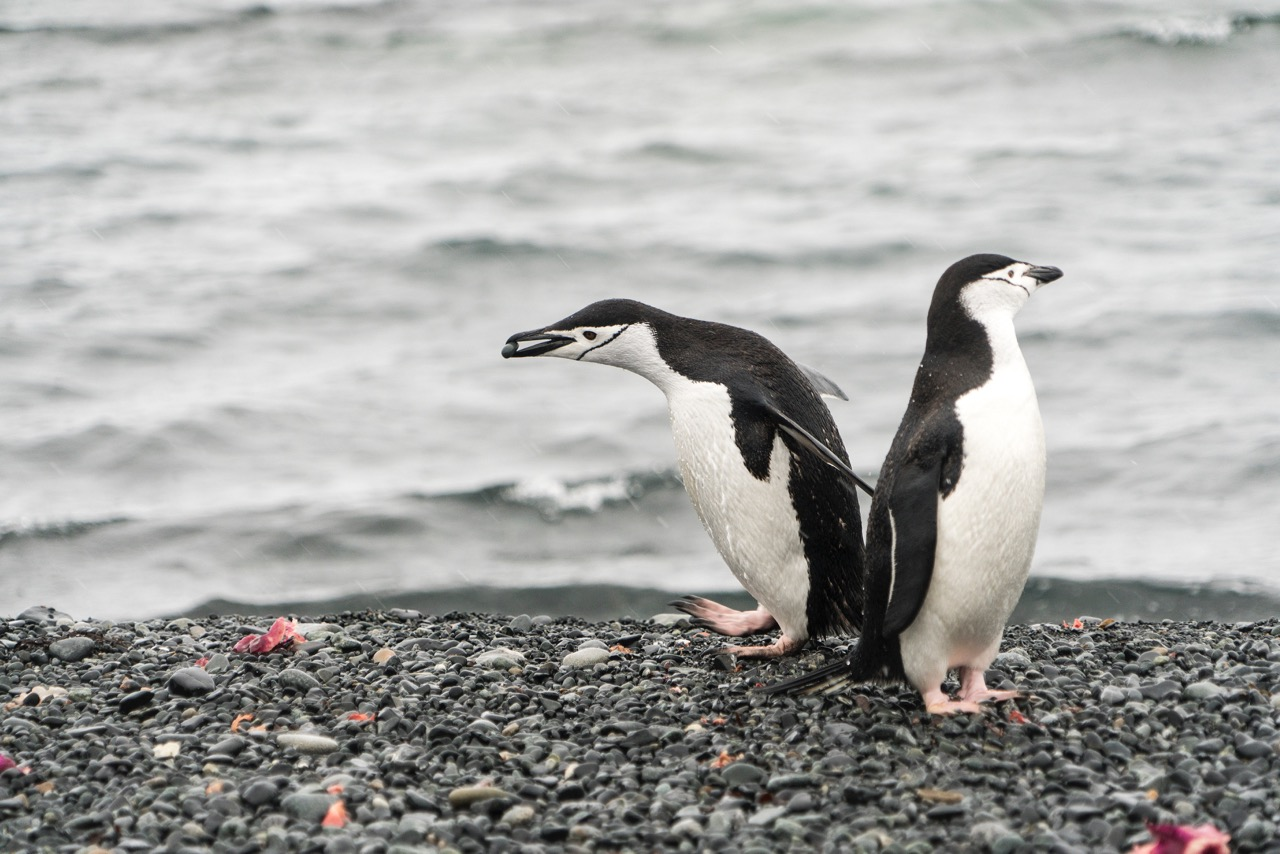
Chinstrap penguins breed in the IBA

Cheal Point is a rocky headland 2 km (1.2 mi) east-south-east of Return Point, the south-western extremity of Coronation Island, in the South Orkney Islands of Antarctica.

== History ==
The headland was first surveyed in 1933 by DI personnel, and named by the UK Antarctic Place-Names Committee for Joseph J. Cheal of the Falkland Islands Dependencies Survey, general assistant in 1950 and leader in 1951 at the Signy Island base. It marks the western limit of Cheal's survey triangulation made in July–September 1950.

== Important Bird Area ==
A 194 ha tract of land, including both Cheal Point and Return Point, has been identified as an Important Bird Area (IBA) by BirdLife International because it supports a large breeding colony of about 38,000 pairs of chinstrap penguins which nest on places which are free of ice cover.
