= Chiel =

Chiel is a Dutch given name. Notable people with the name include:

- Chiel Kramer (born 1992), Dutch footballer
- Chiel Meijering (born 1954), Dutch composer
- Chiel Montagne (1944–2025), Dutch radio and television presenter
- Chiel Warners (born 1978), Dutch decathlete
