= Mischa =

Mischa is a diminutive form of the name Mikhail. It can be used for both men and women.

== Men ==
- Mischa Auer (1905–1967), Russian actor born Mikhail Semyonovich Unskovsky
- Mikhail "Mischa" Bakaleinikoff (1890–1960), Russian-born musical director, Hollywood film composer and conductor
- Mischa Berlinski (born 1973), American writer
- Mischa Boelens (born 1995), Curaçaoan footballer
- Mischa Cotlar (1913–2007), Ukrainian mathematician
- Mischa Daniels, Dutch music producer
- Mischa Dohler (born 1975), Fellow of the Institute of Electrical and Electronics Engineers and the Royal Society of Arts
- Mikhail "Mischa" Elman (1891–1967), Ukrainian-born Jewish-American violinist
- Mischa Hausserman (1941–2021), Austrian-American actor
- Mischa Hiller (born 1962), British novelist
- Mischa Maisky (born 1948), Soviet-born Israeli cellist
- Mischa Markow (1854–1934), pioneering Mormon missionary in Europe
- Mischa Mischakoff (1895–1981), Ukrainian-born American violinist and concertmaster
- Mischa Portnoff (1901–1979), German-born American composer and teacher
- Mischa Richter (1910–2001), American cartoonist best known for his work in The New Yorker
- Mischa Schwartz (born 1926), professor emeritus of electrical engineering at Columbia University
- Mischa Spoliansky (1898–1985), Russian-born composer
- Markus Wolf (1923–2006), East German spymaster
- Mikhail "Mischa" Zverev (born 1987), German tennis player

== Women ==
- Mischa Barton (born 1986), British-American actress and former child model
- Mischa Bredewold (born 2000), Dutch professional cyclist
- Mischa Ginns (born 1981), Australian para-badminton player
- Mischa Merz (born 1981), Australian boxer, painter and journalist
- Mischa Finch (born 1970), American singer, actress and writer

== Fictional characters ==
- Mischa, a tomcat in the 1996 Japanese anime TV series The Story of Cinderella by Hiroshi Sasagawa
- Mischa Fox, in the 1956 novel The Flight from the Enchanter by Iris Murdoch
- Mischa Lecter, in the novel Hannibal, sister of Hannibal Lecter
- Mischa Bachinski, in the Canadian musical Ride the Cyclone with music and lyrics by Jacob Richmond and Brooke Maxwell.

== See also ==
- Misha (disambiguation)
- Micha, a list of people with the given name, nickname or surname
- Measha Brueggergosman (born 1977), a Canadian soprano
