= Mickelson =

Mickelson is a Norwegian patronymic surname, literally meaning son of Michael or Mikkel (one who was like God). Notable people with the surname include:

- Anna Mickelson, American rower
- Asgeir Mickelson, Norwegian musician
- Ed Mickelson (1926–2025), American baseball player
- George S. Mickelson (1941–1993), American politician
- George T. Mickelson (1903–1965), American politician from South Dakota
- Nicholas Mickelson (born 1999), Thai footballer
- Phil Mickelson (born 1970), American golfer
- Sig Mickelson (1913–2000), American broadcast executive (CBS News)
