= Mikel Unzalu =

Spanish politician (1956–2021)

Member of the Basque Parliament
- In office 2009–2016
- Constituency: Álava

Secretary-General of Euskadiko Ezkerra
- In office 1984–1991

Personal details
- Born: Mikel Ángel Unzalu Hermosa; 15 July 1956 Vitoria-Gasteiz, Spain
- Died: 15 July 2021 (aged 65)
- Party: PSE-EE

Mikel Ángel Unzalu Hermosa (15 July 1956 – 15 July 2021) was a Spanish politician. A member of the Socialist Party of the Basque Country–Basque Country Left (PSE-EE), he served as Secretary-General of Euskadiko Ezkerra from 1984 to 1991 and was in the Basque Parliament from 2009 to 2016.

== Biography ==
Unzalu studied education in Vitoria-Gasteiz, graduating in 1976. He promoted Euskadido Ezkerra in Álava, and was known as a "politician-militant" of ETA on behalf of the Spanish Socialist Workers' Party. During his time on Vitoria-Gasteiz's municipal council, from 1987 to 1991, he faced a severe drought and was known as the "water councilor".

Unzalu later served in the Basque Parliament, representing Álava from 2009 to 2016. From 2016 to 2020, he was Secretary of Labour and Employment of the Basque Government. He then directed the Department of Tourism, Commerce and Consumption.

Mikel Unzalu died on 15 July 2021 on his 65th birthday following a long illness.
