= Mikal (given name) =

Mikal is a given name. Notable people with the name include:

- Mikal Bridges (born 1996), American basketball player
- Mikal Cronin (born 1985), American musician and songwriter
- Mikal Gilmore (born 1951), American writer and music journalist
- Mikal Mahdi (1983–2025), American executed spree killer
- Mikal Moore, member of the band Mutha's Day Out
- Mikal Tseggai (born 1995), Dutch politician
- Thomas Mikal Ford (1964–2016), sometimes credited as Tommy Ford, American actor and comedian

== See also ==
- Mikel, given name
