= Mihajlo =

- Gender: male

Other names
- Nicknames: Miha, Miki
- Related names: Michael, Mihailo, Mijailo

Mihajlo (Serbian Cyrillic: Михајло) is a South Slavic variant of the name Michael, often found among Serbs. Cognate names include Mihailo and Mijailo.

Science

- Mihajlo Pupin (1858–1935), Serbian physicist
- Mihajlo D. Mesarovic (born 1928), Serbian American scientist

Sports

- Mihajlo Pjanović (born 1977), Serbian football player
- Mihajlo Andrić (born 1994), Serbian basketball player
- Mihajlo Ristovski (born 1983), Macedonian swimmer
- Mihajlo Cakić (born 1990), Serbian footballer
- Mihajlo Mitić (born 1990), Serbian volleyball player
- Mihajlo Simin (born 2005), Serbian judoka
- Mihajlo Dimitrijević (1927–1995), Serbian high jumper

Military

- Mihajlo Apostolski (1906–1987), Yugoslav general, military theoretician, politician and historian
- Mihajlo Lukić (1886–1961), Austro-Hungarian and Yugoslav general
- Mihajlo–Mitchell Paige (1918–2003), American-Serbian army officer

Royalty and nobility

- Mihajlo Višević (fl. 910–935), ruler of Zahumlje
- Mihajlo Krešimir II (d. 969), king of Croatia
- Mihajlo I of Duklja (d. 1081), Prince of Serbs, ruler of Duklja
- Mihajlo II of Duklja, ruler of Duklja (c. 1101-1102)
- Mihajlo III of Duklja, ruler of Duklja (c. 1180-1189)
- Mihajlo Branivojević (d. 1326), Serbian nobleman
- Mihajlo Obrenović (1823–1868), Prince of Serbia (1839-1842) and (1860-1868)
- Mihajlo Petrović-Njegoš (1908–1986), Prince of Montenegro

Other

- Mihajlo Klajn (1912–1941), Yugoslav Croatian agronomist and communist
- Mihajlo Rostohar (1878–1966), Slovenian psychologist, author and educator
- Mihajlo Kažić (born 1960), Serbian novelist
- Mihajlo Svilojević, Serbian epic poetry hero
- Mihajlo Mihajlovski, Macedonian handball club manager
- Mihajlo Hranjac (fl. 1628), Ragusan builder
- Mihajlo Bata Paskaljević (1923–2004), Serbian actor

== See also ==
- Toponyms: Mihajlovo
- Surnames: Mihajlović
