= Mihajlović =

Mihajlović (Serbian Cyrillic: Михајловић, pronounced [mixǎːjloʋitɕ]) is a common Serbian surname, a patronymic derived from the masculine given name Mihajlo (Michael). It is found throughout former Yugoslavia. Notable people with the surname include:

== People ==
- Dragomir Mihajlović (born 1960), guitarist
- Dušan Mihajlović (politician) (born 1948), politician, former Serbian Minister of the Interior 2000–2003
- Josif Mihajlović Jurukovski (1887–1941), politician
- Milan Mihajlović (born 1945), composer and conductor
- Miloš Mihajlović (born 1978), pianist
- Svetozar Mihajlović (born 1949), politician

=== Sports ===
- Bojan Mihajlović (born 1973), footballer
- Boško Mihajlović (born 1971), footballer
- Branislav Mihajlović (1936–1991), former Yugoslav footballer
- Brankica Mihajlović (born 1991), Serbian volleyballer
- Branko Mihajlović (born 1991), footballer
- Dragan Mihajlović (born 1991), Swiss footballer
- Dragoslav Mihajlović (1906–1978), former Yugoslav footballer
- Dušan Mihajlović (footballer) (born 1985), Serbian footballer
- Ljubomir Mihajlović (born 1943), former Yugoslav footballer
- Nemanja Mihajlović (born 1996), footballer
- Prvoslav Mihajlović (1921–1978), former Yugoslav footballer
- Radmilo Mihajlović (born 1964), former Bosnia and Herzegovina footballer
- Siniša Mihajlović, (1969–2022), Serbian football manager and former player
- Stefan Mihajlović (born 1994), footballer
- Vesko Mihajlović (born 1968), footballer
- Žarko Mihajlović (1920–1986), football coach
