= Michael (given name) =

Masculine given name

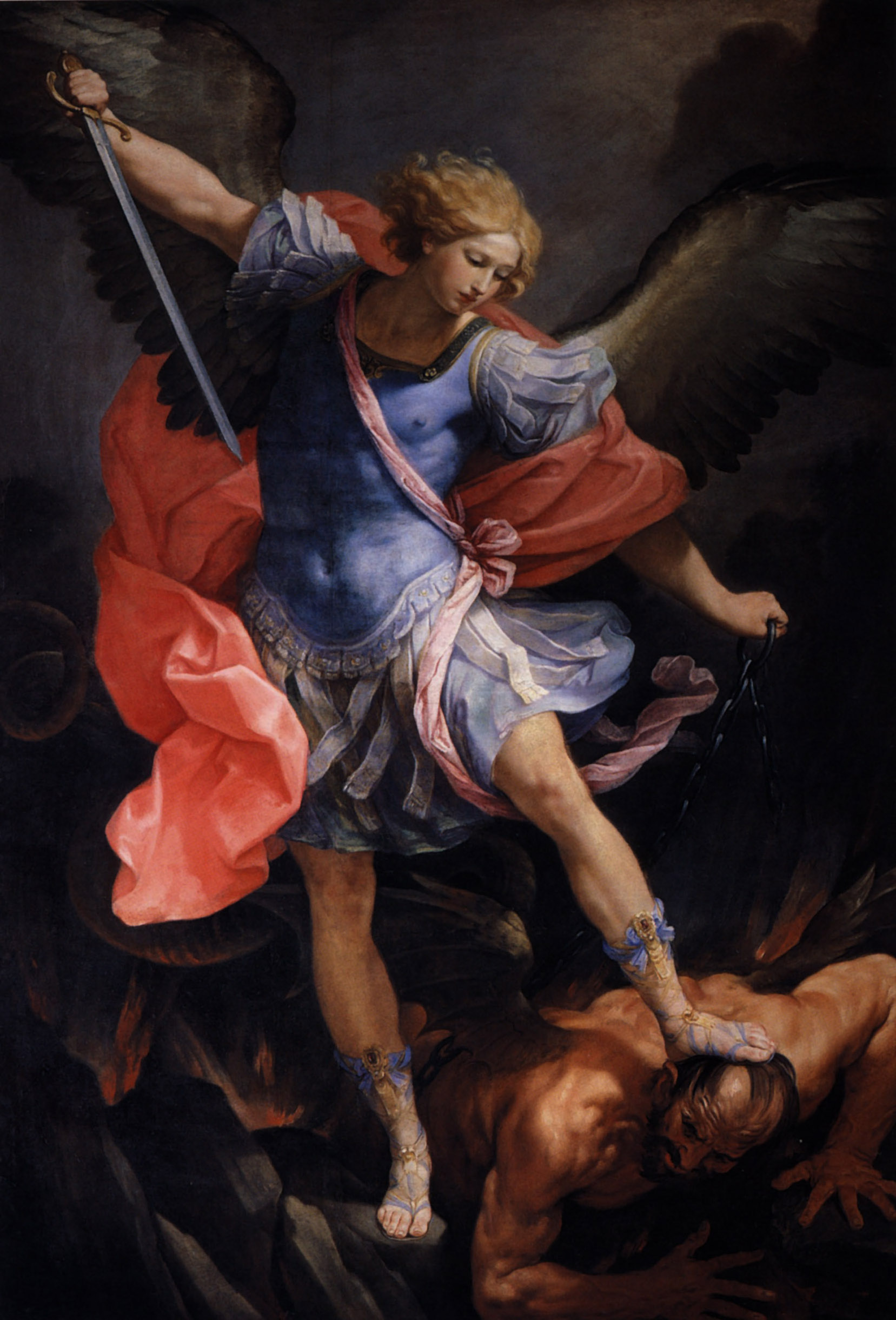
- Archangel Michael
- Pronunciation: English: /ˈmaɪkəl/ MY-kəl; German: [ˈmɪçaʔeːl] Modern Hebrew: [miχaˈʔel] German: [ˈmɪçaˌeːl]
- Gender: Male

Origin
- Meaning: "Who is like God?", "there is none like God", or "there is none as famous and powerful as God"

Other names
- Nicknames: Mic, Mich, Micha, Mick, Mickey, Micki, Mickie, Mike, Mikey, Miki, Mikki, Mico, Miko, Mikha, Misha, Mischa, Mitch, Mitt, Micci
- Derived: Hebrew: מִיכָאֵל (Mīḵāʾēl)
- Related names: Machiel; Maicon or Maycon; Maikel; Michaela; Michelangelo; Michal; Michał; Micheal; Mícheál; Michel; Michele, Michelle; Michiel; Miguel; Miguelita; Mihael; Miha; Mihai; Mihailo; Mykhailo; Mykhaylo; Mihajlo; Mihalis; Mikhalis; Mihály; Mihangel; Mihkel; Mihovil; Miika; Mika; Mikael; Mikail; Mikal; Mikel; Miķelis; Mikhail or Mihail (Михаил); Mihails; Maikls; Mikkel; Mikko; Mishael; Misho; Mitchell; Meka'eyl; Mekhael; Mekha'eyl; Michol; Michole

Michael (Hebrew: מִיכָאֵל; Aramaic: ܡܝܟܐܝܠ, romanized: Mīkhāʼēl) is a common masculine given name usually thought to be from the Hebrew rhetorical question מי כאל (mī kāʼēl), "Who [is] like [the Hebrew god] El?", thus being a theophoric name whose answer is "there is none like El", or "there is none as famous and powerful as God." This question is known in Latin as Quis ut Deus? Paradoxically, the name is also sometimes interpreted as "One who is like God."

An alternative spelling of the name is Micheal. While Michael is most often a masculine name, it is also given to women, such as the actresses Michael Michele and Michael Learned, and Michael Steele, the former bassist for the Bangles.

== Religion ==
=== Judaism ===
The name first appears in the Hebrew Bible in the Book of Numbers 13:13, where Sethur the son of Michael is one of 12 spies sent into the Land of Canaan.

Michael is the name of an archangel in the Book of Daniel 12:1.

=== Christianity ===
The archangel Michael is venerated in the Catholic Church, the Oriental Orthodox Churches, and the Eastern Orthodox Church. For the Catholic Church, 29 September is the feast day of the three archangels: Michael, Gabriel and Raphael. For the Orthodox Church, 8 November is the feast day commemorating the archangels Michael and Gabriel, as well as the whole host of angels, while the Monday of each liturgical week likewise corresponds to the "Bodiless Powers". In the Coptic Orthodox Church, his main feast days are 12 Hathor and 12 Paoni, with lesser feast days on the 12th day of each month of the Coptic calendar.

=== Islam ===
According to Islam, Michael (Mika'el) is an archangel who brings down rain to the earth by the decree of Allah. He was created from light and the one entrusted with the sustenance of creatures, and is also one of the most prominent angels. As the Angel of Mercy, he asks Allah to forgive people's sins.

== Popularity ==
Michael (and its variants) is one of the most common given names for men in the world. In the United States, Michael was the most popular name of the 20th century, ranking No. 1 from 1954 to 1998 (with the exception of 1960, when it was second to David). It was among the top three most popular names for each year since 1953, only falling out of the top five in 2011 for the first time since 1949. Michael is the only name to rank among the ten most popular across all four generations since Generation X.

In 2014, Michael was the 20th most popular name in Northern Ireland, 27th in Canada and 42nd in Australia. In England and Wales, Michael ranked 53rd in 2011 and 2012. Michael ranked as the eighth most popular name for boys in Ireland in 2013.

According to the SSA, Michael is the most popular name among people in the United States who are currently alive, belonging to an estimated 3.83 million living people as of 2021.

Variants of Michael rank among the most popular masculine names in multiple countries. It was the third most popular in Finland from 2010 – March 2015 (as Mikael), seventh in Russia in 2009 (as Mikhail), 14th in Spain in 2012 (as Miguel), and 15th in Denmark (as Mikkel).

== People named Michael ==
- List of people with given name Michael
- List of people with given name Mikhail

== See also ==
- Michael (surname)
- Michael (archangel)
- Mykhailo, a Ukrainian given name
- Great Michael, carrack of the 16th century Kingdom of Scotland
- Michaelia, a Latin name of Mikkeli, town now in Finland
- Mike, common name derived from Michael
- Micky, common name derived from Michael
- List of most popular given names
- Other theophoric names including "El"
