= Mickey =

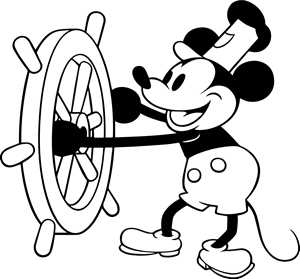
- The name Mickey has associations with the character created by Walt Disney.
- Pronunciation: [Mih-kee]
- Gender: Unisex

Mickey is a given name, nickname, and occasionally a surname. Notable people and characters with the name include:

== People ==
=== Given name or nickname ===
==== Men ====
- Mickey Andrews (born 1942), American retired college football coach
- Mickey Appleman (born 1945), American poker player and sports bettor and handicapper
- Michael Barron (born 1974), English former football player and coach
- Mickey Bullock (1946–2024), English footballer
- Mickey Cochrane (1903–1962), American Hall-of-Fame Major League Baseball player, manager and coach
- Michael Cochrane (musician) (born 1948), American jazz pianist
- Mickey Cohen (1913–1976), American gangster
- Mickey Curry (born 1956), American drummer
- Michael Devine (hunger striker) (1954–1981), a founding member of the Irish National Liberation Army
- Mickey Drexler (born 1944), chairman and CEO of J.Crew Group and former CEO of Gap Inc.
- Mickey Fisher (1904/05–1963), American basketball coach
- Mickey Gilley (1936–2022), American country music artist
- Mickey Gorka (born 1972), Israeli basketball player and coach
- Michael (Mickey) Gubitosi, birth name of Robert Blake (actor) (1933–2023), American actor
- Mickey Guidry (born 1966), American football quarterback
- Mickey Hamill (1889–1943), Northern Irish footballer
- Mickey Hargitay (1926–2006), Hungarian-American actor and 1955 Mr. Universe, husband of Jayne Mansfield
- Mickey Hart (born 1943), American drummer with The Grateful Dead
- Mickey Harte (fl. 2003–present), Gaelic football manager
- Mickey He (born 1976), Chinese television actor and singer
- Mickey Higham (born 1980), English rugby league player
- Mickey Hole (1892–1969), National Football League player
- Mickey Jones (1941–2018), American musician and actor
- Mickey Katz (1909–1985), American musician and comedian
- Mickey Kantor (born 1939), American politician and lawyer
- Mickey Kearns (born 1943), Gaelic footballer
- Mickey Kuhn (1932–2022), American former child actor
- Mickey Levy (born 1951), Israeli politician
- Mickey Lolich (born 1940), American former Major League Baseball player
- Mickey Loomis (born 1956), general manager of the NFL's New Orleans Saints since 2002
- Mickey Madden (born 1979), American musician, bassist for the pop rock band Maroon 5
- Mickey Mantle (1931–1995), American Hall-of-Fame Major League Baseball player
- Mickey Marvin (1955–2017), American former National Football League player
- Mickey Melchiondo (born 1970), guitarist for Ween under the stage name Dean Ween
- Mickey Michaux (born 1930), American politician
- Mickey Morandini (born 1966), American former Major League Baseball player
- Mickey Moniak (born 1998), American baseball player
- Mickey Muennig (1935 –2021), American architect
- Mickey Newbury (1940–2002), American singer and songwriter
- Mickey Owen (1916–2005), American Major League Baseball player, coach and scout
- Mickey Perz (born 1984), Filipino-Swiss actor and dancer
- Mickey Redmond (born 1947), Canadian former National Hockey League player
- Mickey Rivers (born 1948), American former Major League Baseball player
- Mickey Rooney (1920–2014), American film actor
- Mickey Rose (1935–2013), American screenwriter
- Mickey Rosenthal (born 1955), Israeli investigative journalist and politician
- Mickey Rourke (born 1952), American film actor
- Mickey Russell, American football player
- Mickey Shaughnessy (1920–1985), American actor
- Mickey Spillane (1918–2006), American detective fiction author
- Mickey Stanley (born 1942), American former Major League Baseball player
- William "Mickey" Stevenson (born c. 1940), American songwriter and record producer
- Mickey Squires (born 1952), American actor and model
- Mickey Tettleton (born 1960), American former Major League Baseball player
- Mickey Vernon (1918–2008), American Major League Baseball player, manager and coach
- Mickey Walsh (born 1954), English footballer
- Mickey Washington (born 1968), American former National Football League player
- Mickey Weintraub (1907–1987), American Major League Baseball player
- Mickey Welch (1859–1941), American Major League pitcher

==== Women ====
- Mickey Champion (1925–2014), American blues singer
- Mickey Coffino, American businessperson
- Mickey Conley (born 1964/1965), American reporter and sports broadcaster
- Mickey de Boer, Dutch cricketer
- Mickey Dewar (1956–2017), American historian
- Mickey Facchinello (born 1991), American martial artist and actress
- Mickey Faerch, American actress
- Mickey Ferriols (born 1973), Filipino actress
- Mickey Guyton (born 1983), American country music artist
- Emily "Mickey" Hahn (1905–1997), American writer
- Mickie James (born 1979), American professional wrestler
- Mickey O'Brien, English composer and musician
- Mickey O'Hagan, American actress
- Mickey Patterson (1926–1996), South African athletic
- Mickey Petitto, American politician
- Mickey Zucker Reichert (born 1962), American fantasy fiction author
- Mickey Shiloh (born 1992), American songwriter, recording artist, and entrepreneur
- Mickey Smith (artist) (born 1972), American photographer and conceptual artist
- Mickey Sumner (born 1984), English actress
- Mickey Waldman (1942–2008), American radio personality and producer
- Mickey Walker (golfer) (born 1952), English professional golfer
- Mickey Winters (born 1940), American model
- Mickey Wright (1935–2020), American Hall-of-Fame golfer
- Mickey Zacchilli (born 1983), American comics artist and voice actor

=== Surname ===
- Joey Mickey (born 1970), American former football player
- John H. Mickey (1845–1910), American politician, 13th governor of Nebraska
- Jordan Mickey (born 1994), American basketball player
- Ruth Mickey (born 1954), American statistician

== Fictional characters ==
- Mickey Mouse, a cartoon character in the titular franchise
- Big Mickey, a dockside crane from the children's television series TUGS
- Mickey Abbott, a recurring side character in Seinfeld
- Mickey Goldmill, in the Rocky franchise
- Mickey Horton, in the American soap opera Days of Our Lives
- Mickey Milkovich, a recurring character in the American television series Shameless
- Mickey Miller, in the British soap opera EastEnders
- Mickey Smith, in the British science-fiction series Doctor Who
- Mickey Barnes, the titular protagonist of the novel Mickey7 and its movie adaptation Mickey 17.

== See also ==
- Michael (disambiguation)
- Mick (disambiguation)
- MickeyD
- Micky
- Mikey
- Mickey_(unit)
