= Mick =

Mick is a masculine given name or nickname. It is often short for Michael.

Because of its popularity in Ireland, it is often used in the English-speaking world as an ethnic slur for Irish people. In Australia, the meaning also broadened to include all Catholics. A colloquial but possibly false etymology also attributes the origin of the slur to the prevalence of Irish surnames containing the patronymic prefix "Mc-/Mac-" (or Mhic); whether this patronym significantly contributed to the development of the slur is debated, but the prevalence of the first name or nickname "Mick" among Irish people is considered by etymologists to be its primary origin.

== People ==
- Mick Abrahams (1943–2025), English guitarist and band leader, original guitarist for Jethro Tull
- Mick Aston (1946–2013), English archaeologist
- Mick Batyske, aka Mick (DJ), American DJ
- Mick Brown, half of the British vocal duo Pat and Mick
- Mick Clarke (born 1989), Irish footballer
- Mick Coady (born 1958), English footballer
- Mick Cronin (basketball) (born 1971), American basketball coach
- Mick Erwin (1946–2026), Australian rules footballer and coach
- Mick Fanning (born 1981), Australian professional surfer
- Mick Fleetwood (born 1947), British drummer and founding member of Fleetwood Mac
- Mick Foley (born 1965), American professional wrestler, actor and author
- Mick Gadsby (1947–2025), English footballer
- Mick Harvey (born 1958), Australian musician, singer-songwriter, composer, arranger and record producer
- Mick Herron, British mystery and thriller novelist
- Mick Hucknall (born 1960), English singer and songwriter
- Mick Jagger (born 1943), lead singer and songwriter for the Rolling Stones
- Mick Jenkins (rugby league) (born 1972), Welsh rugby footballer
- Mick Jenkins (rapper) (born 1991), American rapper
- Mick Jones (disambiguation)
- Mick Kenney (born 1980), British musician
- Mick Linden, bassist and singer
- Mick Mannock (1887–1918), British First World War fighter ace
- Mick Mars (born 1951), American guitarist for Mötley Crüe born Robert Alan Deal
- Mick Mashbir, American guitarist
- Mick McGinley (born 1940), Irish Gaelic footballer and father of professional golfer Paul
- Mick Mercer (born 1958), British journalist
- Mick Molloy (born 1966), Australian comedian, writer, producer and actor
- Mick Molloy (athlete) (1938–2023), Irish long-distance runner
- Mick Molloy (rugby union) (born 1944), Irish rugby union player
- Mick Moss (born 1975), English singer/songwriter
- Mick Mulvaney (born 1967), American politician
- Mick Peck (born 1981), New Zealand magician
- Mick Ralphs (1944–2025), English guitarist and songwriter, founding member of rock bands Mott the Hoople and Bad Company
- Mick Ronson (1946–1993), English guitarist for David Bowie's The Spiders from Mars
- Mick Schumacher (born 1999), German racing driver and son of former F1 champion Michael Schumacher
- Mick Taylor (born 1949), English guitarist for the Rolling Stones
- Mick Thomson (born 1973), American guitarist for Slipknot
- Mick Tongraya (born 1992), Thai actor and model

== Fictional characters ==
- Mick Carter, on the British soap opera EastEnders
- Mickey Goldmill, commonly addressed as Mick, in Rocky, Rocky II and Rocky III

== See also ==
- The Mick (disambiguation)
- Mickey (disambiguation)
- MIC (disambiguation)
- Micky
- Micki
- Taking the mick
