= Amarcord Nino Rota =

Studio album by (Various)
- Recorded: 1981
- Label: Hannibal
- Producer: Hal Willner

Professional ratings
Review scores
| Source | Rating |
|---|---|
| AllMusic | 3/5 stars |

Amarcord Nino Rota is an album by various artists, recorded as a tribute to composer Nino Rota.

== Background and recording ==
The album is a tribute to composer Nino Rota and contains adaptations of his compositions for Federico Fellini films. It was the first of producer Hal Willner's tribute albums, and featured then-little-known musicians such as Wynton Marsalis and Bill Frisell. It was recorded in 1981.

== Reception ==
Writing in The Boston Phoenix, critic Bob Blumenthal said that "Even listeners unfamiliar with Fellini's movies should sense how these melodies, with their playful mix of sentiment and irreverence, lend themselves to jazz improvisors. ... Like a good casting director, [producer Hal Willner] has chosen arrangers eclectically, yet with an unerring sense of character type; and like a skilled film editor, he has paced the album meticulously, with terse foreshadowings and framing devices that keep the solo and duet performances in dramatic balance with the larger ensemble efforts."

== Track listing ==
1. "Amarcord"
2. "Interlude from Juliet of the Spirits"
3. "8 1/2"
4. "Theme from La Dolce Vita and Juliet of the Spirits"
5. "Juliet of the Spirits"
6. "La Dolce Vita Suite (Introduction/Notturno/Interlude/Valzer [Parlami Di Me])"
7. "Satyricon"
8. "Roma"
9. "Medley: The White Sheik/I Vitelloni/Il Bidone/The Nights of Cabiria"
10. "La Strada"

== Personnel ==
Tracks 1 and 10

- Jaki Byard – piano, arranger

Tracks 2 and 4

- Dave Samuels – vibes, arranger

Track 3

- Carla Bley – organ, glockenspiel, conductor, arranger
- Michael Mantler – trumpet
- Gary Valente – trombone
- Earl McIntyre – tuba
- Gary Windo – tenor sax
- Courtenay Wynter – woodwinds
- Joe Daley – euphonium
- Arturo O'Farrill – piano
- Steve Swallow – bass
- D. Sharpe – drums

Track 5

- Bill Frisell – guitar, arranger

Track 6: part a & c

- Sharon Freeman – French horn, piano, arranger
- Francis Haynes – steel drums

Track 6: part b

- Muhal Richard Abrams – conductor, arranger
- Claudio Roditi – trumpet
- Emmet McDonald – trombone
- Sharon Freeman – French horn
- Henry Threadgill – flute
- Bobby Eldridge – baritone sax, clarinet
- Jay Hoggard – vibes
- Amina Claudine Myers – piano
- Fred Hopkins – bass
- Warren Smith – drums

Track 6: part d

- Michael Sahl – keyboards, co-arranger
- Chris Stein – guitar, co-arranger
- Deborah Harry – vocals
- Charles Rocket – accordion, bells
- Lenny Ferrari – drums

Track 7

- David Amram – penny whistle, double ocarina, shanai, guitar, claves, arranger
- Jerry Dodgion – flute
- Sharon Freeman – French horn
- Victor Venegas – bass
- Ray Mantilla – percussion
- Steve Berrios – percussion

Track 8

- Steve Lacy – soprano sax, gong, arranger

Track 9

- William Fischer – conductor, arranger
- Wynton Marsalis – trumpet
- George Adams – tenor sax
- Branford Marsalis – woodwinds
- Kenny Barron – piano
- Ron Carter – bass
- Wilbert Fletcher – drums
