= Mickey (disambiguation) =

Mickey is a given name, nickname and surname.

Mickey may also refer to:

== Arts and entertainment ==
- Mickey Mouse, a cartoon character and mascot from The Walt Disney Company
- Mickey (1918 film), a silent film starring Mabel Normand
- Mickey (1948 film), starring Lois Butler
- Mickey (2004 film), a baseball film starring Harry Connick, Jr.
- Mickey (TV series), a 1964–1965 series starring Mickey Rooney
- "Mickey" (Toni Basil song), 1981
- "Mickey" (Lil Yachty song), 2018

== Computing and technology ==
- MICKEY, a stream cipher algorithm that is part of the eSTREAM portfolio
- Mouse dpi or mickey, a measure of distance reported by a computer mouse
- Mickey or 1850XLD, which was developed into the Atari ST home computer
- Mickey set, H2X American ground scanning radar

== Other uses ==
- Mickey Finn (drugs) or mickey, a drink laced with drugs
- Mickey, a Canadian slang term for a 375 mL bottle of liquor
- Mickey Hot Springs, a small hot spring system in Oregon, United States
- Mickey is a Paraguayan food company
