= Mick Clarke =

Mick Clarke may refer to:

- Mick Clarke (footballer)
- Mick Clarke (musician)

== See also ==
- Mick Clark, English rugby league player
- Michael Clarke (disambiguation)
