= Mickey Mouse =

Disney cartoon character and mascot

- Mickey Mouse character
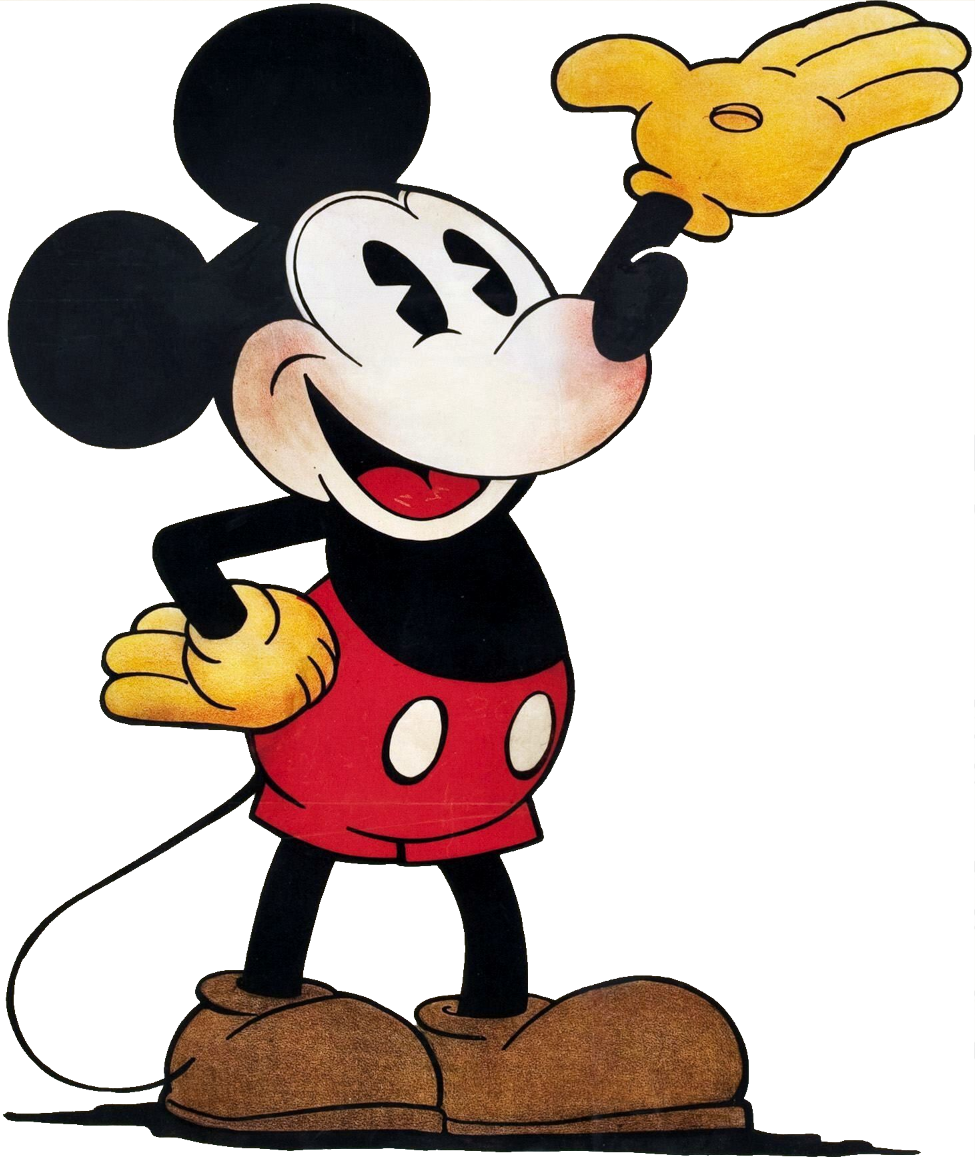
- Mickey Mouse as he appears in a 1928 poster
- First appearance: Steamboat Willie (1928)
- Created by: Walt Disney; Ub Iwerks
- Designed by: Walt Disney; Ub Iwerks (original design); Fred Moore (1930s redesign)
- Voiced by: Walt Disney (1928–1947, 1955–1962); Carl W. Stalling (1929); Jimmy MacDonald (1947–1978); Wayne Allwine (1977–2009); Bret Iwan (2009–present); Chris Diamantopoulos (2013–2023); See § Voice actors

In-universe information
- Aliases: Sorcerer Mickey; Bob Cratchit; King Mickey
- Species: Mouse
- Gender: Male
- Occupation: Varies
- Family: Mickey Mouse family Pluto (dog)
- Significant other: Minnie Mouse
- Nationality: American

Mickey Mouse is a cartoon character co-created in 1928 by Walt Disney and Ub Iwerks. The longtime corporate icon and mascot of the Walt Disney Company and a figurehead of American animation, Mickey is an anthropomorphic mouse who typically wears red shorts, large shoes, and white gloves. He is often depicted with a cast of characters including his girlfriend Minnie Mouse, his pet dog Pluto, his best friends Donald Duck and Goofy, and his nemesis Pete.

Mickey was created as a replacement for a prior character created by Disney, Oswald the Lucky Rabbit. The character was originally to be named "Mortimer Mouse", until Disney's wife, Lillian, suggested "Mickey". Mickey first appeared in two 1928 shorts Plane Crazy and The Gallopin' Gaucho (which were not picked up for distribution) before his public debut in Steamboat Willie (1928). The character went on to appear in over 130 films, mostly short films. His relatively few feature films include Fantasia (1940). Since 1930, Mickey has been featured extensively in comic strips (including the Mickey Mouse comic strip, which ran for 45 years) and comic books (such as Mickey Mouse). The character has also been featured in television series such as The Mickey Mouse Club (1955–1996).

Inspired by such silent film personalities as Charlie Chaplin and Douglas Fairbanks, Mickey is traditionally portrayed as a sympathetic underdog who gets by on pluck and ingenuity in the face of challenges bigger than himself. The character's depiction as a small mouse is personified through his diminutive stature and falsetto voice, the latter of which was originally provided by Walt Disney. Though originally characterized as a cheeky lovable rogue, Mickey was rebranded over time as a nice guy, usually seen as a spirited, yet impulsive hero.

Mickey is one of the world's most recognizable fictional characters, often described as a global cultural icon and one of the most famous cultural symbols of the 20th century. He also appears in media such as video games as well as merchandising and is a meetable character at the Disney parks. Ten of Mickey's cartoons were nominated for the Academy Award for Best Animated Short Film, one of which, Lend a Paw, won the award in 1941. In 1978, Mickey became the first cartoon character to have a star on the Hollywood Walk of Fame.

== Creation ==
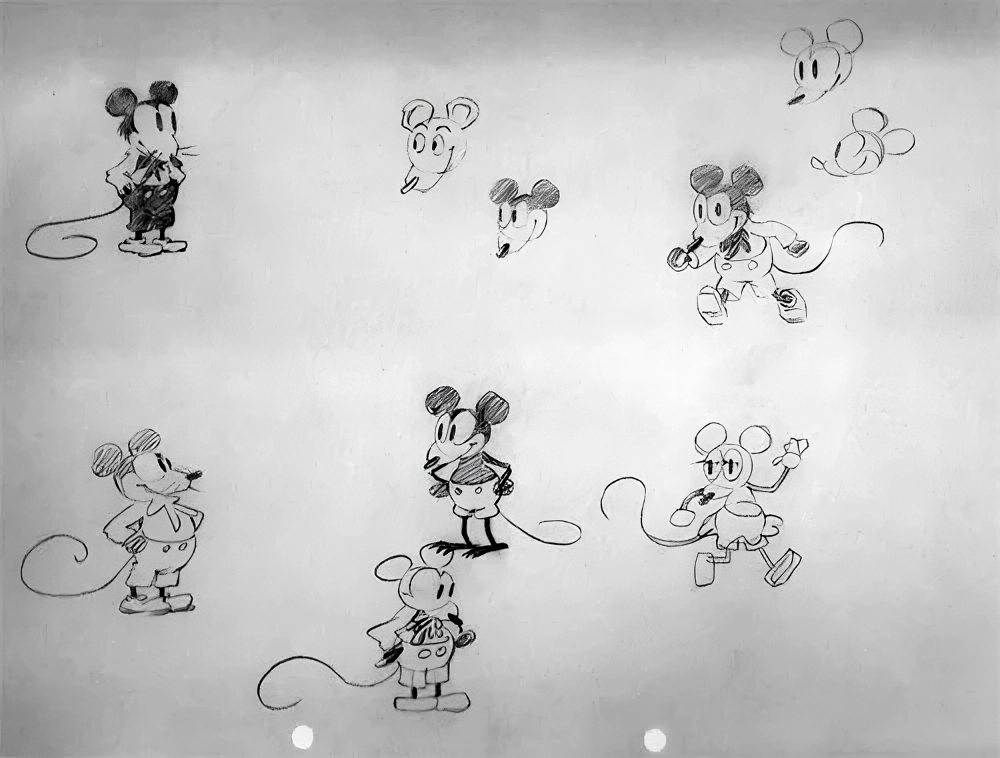
The earliest known concept art of Mickey and Minnie Mouse from early 1928, largely attributed to Ub Iwerks, but speculated to include work from Walt Disney or Les Clark; The Walt Disney Family Museum collection

Mickey Mouse was created as a replacement for Oswald the Lucky Rabbit, an earlier cartoon character that was created by Walt Disney and Ub Iwerks for Universal Pictures during their time at Winkler Pictures. In an unsuccessful February 1928 meeting with Winkler producer Charles Mintz to negotiate a higher budget, he left in disappointment, only to find that Mintz secretly convinced his staff to move to an in-house studio. Among the few who refused and stayed with him were animator Ub Iwerks, apprentice artist Les Clark, and Wilfred Jackson.

A new character was workshopped out of necessity and in relative secret. Various myths exist of Walt Disney's inspiration for Mickey (including some which were likely ghostwritten), such as that the starving artist drew inspiration from a tame mouse (or pair of mice) at his desk at Laugh-O-Gram Studio in Kansas City, Missouri, or that he undertook a romantic search for inspiration on the train ride home from his disappointing meeting with Mintz. At Disney's behest, Iwerks sketched new character ideas based on various animals such as dogs and cats, but none of these appealed to Disney. A female cow and male horse were rejected, as was a male frog. (Note: These were later repurposed as Clarabelle Cow, Horace Horsecollar, and Iwerks' Flip the Frog.) In 1925, Hugh Harman drew some sketches of mice around a photograph of Walt Disney, reputedly based on Disney's own designs (similar to those he included on family birthday cards). These inspired Iwerks to create a new mouse character for Disney.

"Mortimer Mouse" had been Disney's original name for the character before his wife, Lillian, convinced him to change it. (Note: Over the years, the name 'Mortimer Mouse' was eventually given to several different characters in the Mickey Mouse universe: Minnie Mouse's uncle, who appears in several comics stories, one of Mickey's antagonists who competes for Minnie's affections in various works, and one of Mickey's nephews, Morty.) It has been speculated that Disney saw the name on a similarly named Performo toy called Micky Mouse. Additionally, actor Mickey Rooney claimed that during his time performing as the title character of the Mickey McGuire film series (1927–1934), he met Walt Disney at the Warner Bros. studio, inspiring Disney to name the character after him; however, Disney Studios was located on Hyperion Avenue at the time, with Disney conducting no business at Warner Bros. (Note: Mickey Rooney voiced the post-Disney Oswald the Rabbit in a couple of 1931 films.)

The first feature-length movie with dialogue sequences, The Jazz Singer starring Al Jolson, was released on October 6, 1927. Several additional talkies followed, and movie theaters began installing the necessary equipment. Walt Disney reputedly discussed making sound cartoons in late May 1928. After composer Carl W. Stalling initially voiced Mickey for the 1929 talkie shorts The Karnival Kid and Wild Waves, Disney himself provided the often-shy falsetto voice—a large part of the character's onscreen persona.

=== Design ===
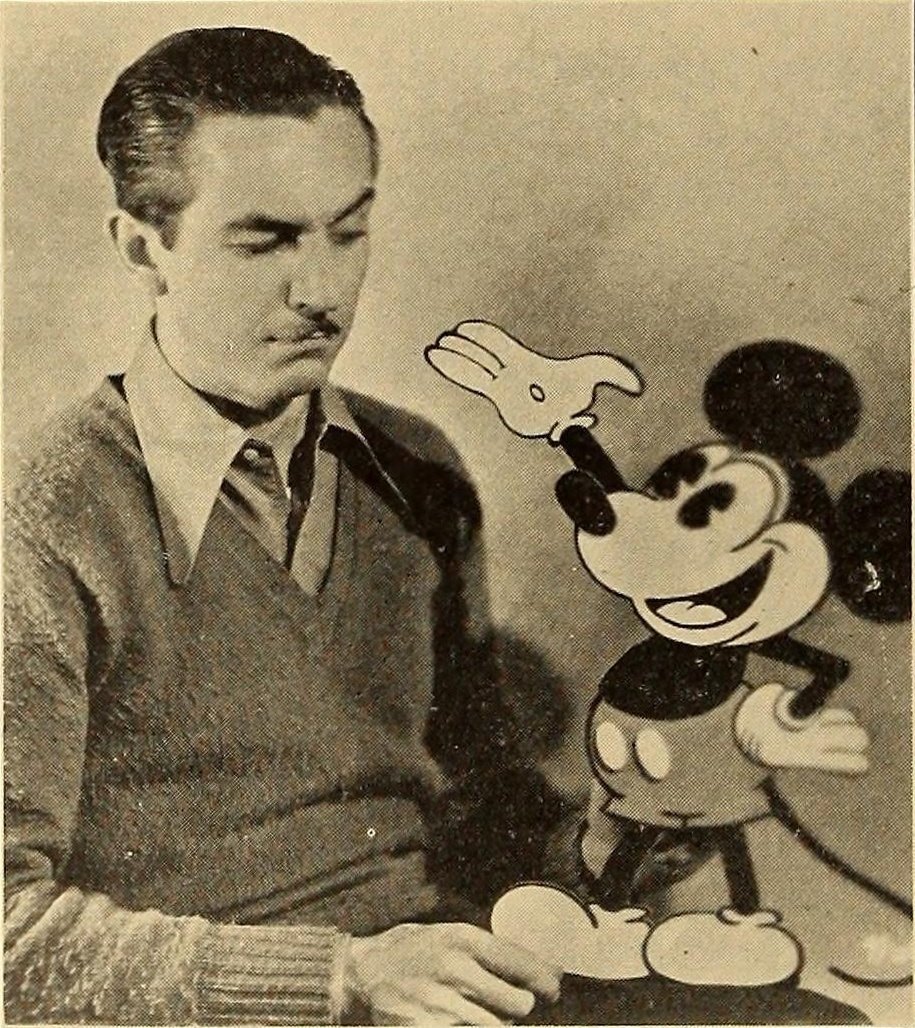
Walt Disney with a cutout of Mickey as he was drawn by the end of 1928

Mickey's original design strongly resembled Oswald the Rabbit, save for the ears, nose, and tail. Ub Iwerks designed Mickey's body out of circles (distinctly, the ears) to make the character easy to animate. (Note: Disney employees John Hench and Marc Davis believed that this initial design was part of Mickey's success as it made him more dynamic and appealing.) Upon his creation, Mickey's features shared similarities to a number of his cartoon predecessors with large eyes and mouth on a black body (Note: Prototypical Mickeys by Walt Disney are designed this way as well, sometimes with light gloves. Frank Thomas and Ollie Johnston explain that Mickey's original eyes consist of a small pupil and goggle-like whites (any 'hairline' defined by the eyes and lips).) (e.g. Oswald and Felix the Cat). From early 1929, Mickey also wore white gloves (Note: From 1927 to 1928, animators Robert and Tom McKimson drew a children's book titled Mouse Tales, featuring mice strongly resembling Mickey. They wear white gloves, but have white bodies (while a gloved leprechaun has a dark upper body and 'exposed' white legs). The McKimson brothers then apprenticed as Disney animators c. mid-1929, with the drawings subsequently spending six decades in storage.) (similar to those appearing on later characters, e.g. Bosko and Bimbo). (Note: In minstrel shows, gloves are part of the costume of the stereotypical black "dandy", who imitates the lifestyle of well-to-do whites.) Several sources state that this scheme evolved from blackface caricatures used in minstrel shows. (Note: The Mickey film The Jazz Fool (1929) is a parody of Jolson movies, the title alluding to The Jazz Singer and The Singing Fool (1928). Mickey and others take on a layer of lip-accentuating blackface in Mickey's Mellerdrammer (1933), parodying Uncle Tom's Cabin.) (Note: M. Thomas Inge points out that although earlier minstrelesque cartoon characters lacked "the language or cultural mannerisms of black life ... Mickey has sometimes been thought to retain some of the free-swinging style" associated with black culture. White gloves appear on many later characters such as Jiminy Cricket, Pinocchio, Bugs Bunny, Woody Woodpecker, Mighty Mouse, Mario, and Sonic the Hedgehog.) Additionally, Mickey's original black hands could not be seen if they passed in front of his torso. This limitation encouraged animators to base their poses on silhouette, much in the manner of Charlie Chaplin films. (Note: Although the design had been developed for earlier characters, Walt Disney playfully explained: "Artistically, five digits are too many for a mouse. His hand would look like a bunch of bananas. Financially, not having an extra finger in each of 45,000 drawings that make up a six and one-half minute short has saved the studio millions." Disney also stated that the gloves helped make Mickey appear more human.)

Minnie Mouse was designed similarly to Mickey, with only superficial details being different. In the 1930s, animator Fred Moore tried giving Mickey's body more of a pear shape to increase his acting range; Walt Disney liked this adaptation and declared, "that's the way I want Mickey to be drawn from now on." (Note: Colleague Ward Kimball praised Moore for being the first animator to break from Mickey's "rubber-hose, round-circle" design.) Moore maintained that the character should always be drawn from a pleasing angle, ears included, as opposed to depicting Mickey as a realistic 3D character.

Mickey's eyes were originally large and white with black outlines, with the tops able to deform like eyebrows; the pupil was circular (with a triangle cut out in poster close-ups to simulate reflected light). Starting with Steamboat Willie, the bottom portion of the black outlines was removed, often making the pupil placement look strange. The pupils began to be treated as stationary, dotlike eyes, requiring the entire head to be moved to make Mickey look around. During the production of Fantasia in the late 1930s, Fred Moore redesigned Mickey with small white pupilled eyes, (Note: Animator Ward Kimball drew Mickey with such an eye style for a Snow White and the Seven Dwarfs (1937) wrap party. Moore's redesign debuted in 1938 on a party program cover and then in short films in 1939, e.g. Mickey's Surprise Party and The Pointer.) with the redefined facial area being given a light skin color. (Note: The original eye outlines were left, essentially forming a widow's peak.) Distinct, lined eyebrows were later added and are currently used occasionally.

Besides Mickey's gloves and shoes, he typically wears only a pair of shorts with two large buttons in the front. Before Mickey was seen regularly in color animation, Mickey's shorts were either red or a dull blue-green. With the advent of Mickey's color films, they were always red. When Mickey is not wearing his shorts, he is often still wearing red clothing. (Note: E.g. a bandmaster coat (The Band Concert, The Mickey Mouse Club), overalls (Clock Cleaners, Boat Builders), a cloak (Fantasia, Fun and Fancy Free), a coat (Squatter's Rights, Mickey's Christmas Carol), and a shirt (Mickey Down Under, The Simple Things)) Due to budgetary limits imposed by World War II, Mickey temporarily lost his tail, e.g. in The Little Whirlwind (1941).

== Appearances ==
=== Film ===
==== Debut (1928) ====
Mickey's debut in Steamboat Willie (1928)

Mickey was first seen in a test screening of the cartoon short Plane Crazy, on May 15, 1928, but it failed to impress the audience and Disney could not find a distributor. Disney went on to produce a second Mickey short, The Gallopin' Gaucho, which also could not find a distributor.

Steamboat Willie was first released on November 18, 1928, in New York. It was co-directed by Walt Disney and Ub Iwerks. Iwerks again served as the head animator, assisted by Les Clark, Johnny Cannon, Wilfred Jackson and Dick Lundy. This short was a nod to Buster Keaton's Steamboat Bill, Jr., released earlier that year. Although it was the third Mickey cartoon produced, it was the first to find a distributor, and thus is considered by The Disney Company as Mickey's debut. It also featured some design refinements, and included the use of a bouncing ball on the film print to allow conductors and musicians to match the tempo of their music with the film.

The cartoon was not the first cartoon to feature a soundtrack connected to the action. Fleischer Studios, headed by brothers Dave and Max Fleischer, had already released a number of sound cartoons using the DeForest system in the mid-1920s. However, these cartoons did not keep the sound synchronized throughout the film. For Willie, Disney had the sound recorded with a click track that kept the musicians on the beat. This precise timing is apparent during the "Turkey in the Straw" sequence when Mickey's actions exactly match the accompanying instruments. Animation historians have long debated who had served as the composer for the film's original music. This role has been variously attributed to Wilfred Jackson, Carl Stalling and Bert Lewis, but identification remains uncertain. Walt Disney himself was voice actor for both Mickey and Minnie and would remain the source of Mickey's voice through 1946 for theatrical cartoons. Jimmy MacDonald took over the role in 1946, but Walt provided Mickey's voice again from 1955 to 1959 for The Mickey Mouse Club television series on ABC.

Audiences at the time of Steamboat Willie's release were reportedly impressed by the use of sound for comedic purposes. Sound films or "talkies" were still considered innovative. Most other cartoon studios were still producing silent products and so were unable to effectively act as competition to Disney. As a result, Mickey would soon become the most prominent animated character of the time. Walt Disney then worked on adding sound to both Plane Crazy and The Gallopin' Gaucho (which were originally silent releases) and their new releases added to Mickey's success and popularity. A fourth Mickey short, The Barn Dance, was also put into production; however, Mickey does not actually speak until The Karnival Kid (1929). After Steamboat Willie was released, Mickey became a close competitor to Felix the Cat, and his popularity would grow as he was continuously featured in sound cartoons. By 1929, Felix would lose popularity among theater audiences, and Pat Sullivan decided to produce all future Felix cartoons in sound as a result. Audiences did not respond well to Felix's transition to sound and by 1930, Felix had faded from the screen.

==== Black and white films (1929–1935) ====
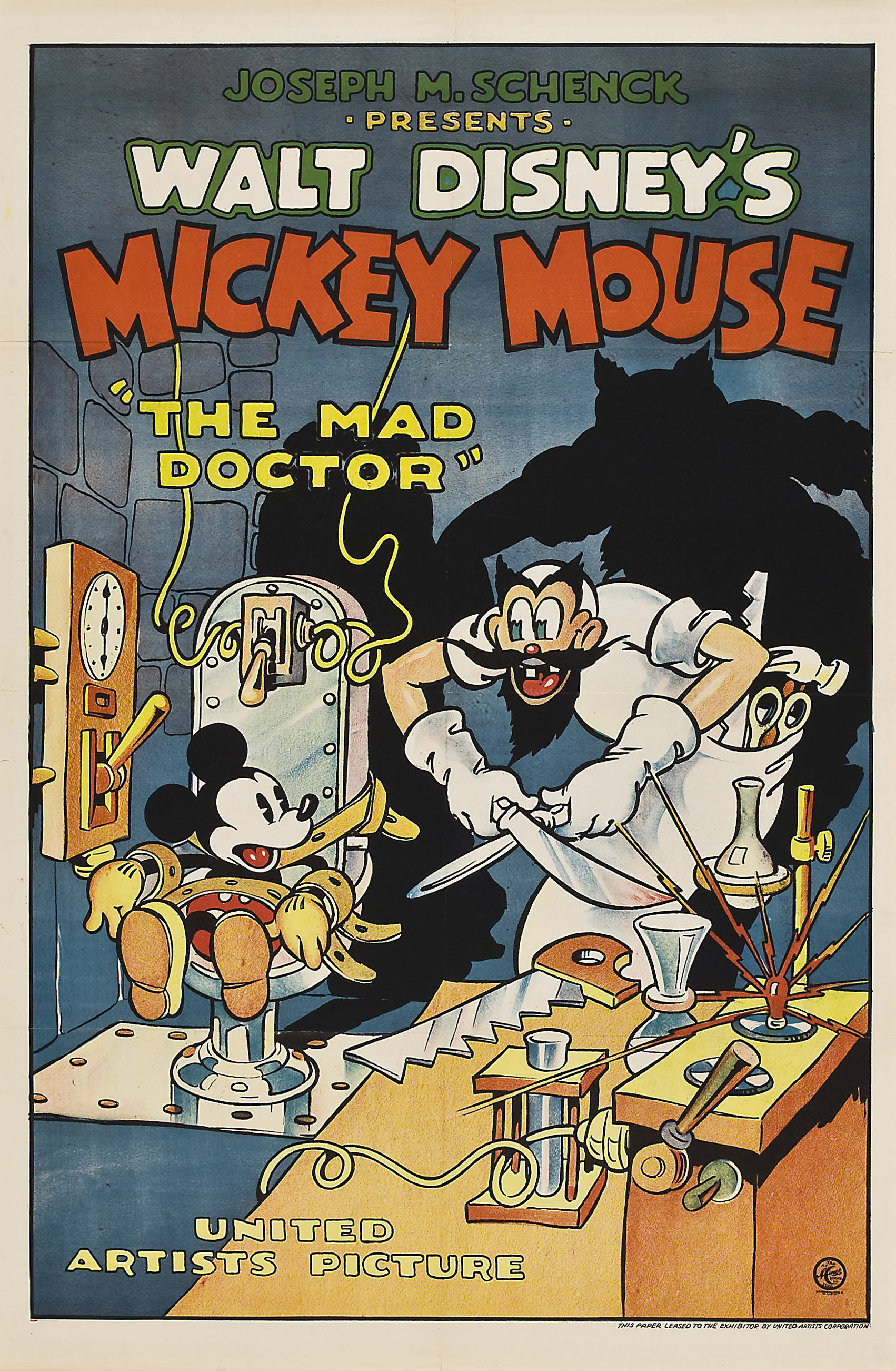
Poster of the 1933 short The Mad Doctor

In Mickey's early films he was often characterized not as a hero, but as an ineffective young suitor to Minnie Mouse. The Barn Dance (March 14, 1929) is the first time in which Mickey is turned down by Minnie in favor of Pete. The Opry House (March 28, 1929) was the first time in which Mickey wore his white gloves. Mickey wears them in almost all of his subsequent appearances and many other characters followed suit. The three lines on the back of Mickey's gloves represent darts in the gloves' fabric extending from between the digits of the hand, typical of glove design of the era.

When the Cat's Away (April 18, 1929), essentially a remake of the Alice Comedy short Alice Rattled by Rats, was an unusual appearance for Mickey. Although Mickey and Minnie still maintained their anthropomorphic characteristics, they were depicted as the size of regular mice and living with a community of many other mice as pests in a home. Mickey and Minnie would later appear the size of regular humans in their own setting. In appearances with real humans, Mickey has been shown to be about two to three feet high. The next Mickey short was also unusual. The Barnyard Battle (April 25, 1929) was the only film to depict Mickey as a soldier and also the first to place him in combat. The Karnival Kid (1929) was the first time Mickey spoke. Before this he had only whistled, laughed, and grunted. His first words were "Hot dogs! Hot dogs!" said while trying to sell hot dogs at a carnival. Mickey's Follies (1929) introduced the song "Minnie's Yoo-Hoo" which would become the theme song for Mickey Mouse films until 1935. The same song sequence was also later reused with different background animation as its own special short shown only at the commencement of 1930s theater-based Mickey Mouse Clubs. Mickey's dog Pluto first appeared as Mickey's pet in The Moose Hunt (1931) after previously appearing as Minnie's dog "Rover" in The Picnic (1930).

Wild Waves was the last Mickey Mouse cartoon to be animated by Ub Iwerks. Iwerks left to start his own studio, bankrolled by Disney's then-distributor Pat Powers. Powers and Disney had a falling out over money due Disney from the distribution deal. It was in response to losing the right to distribute Disney's cartoons that Powers made the deal with Iwerks, who had long harbored a desire to head his own studio. The departure is considered a turning point in Mickey's career, as well as that of Walt Disney. Walt lost the man who served as his closest colleague and confidant since 1919. Mickey lost the man responsible for his original design and for the direction or animation of several of the shorts released till this point. Advertising for the early Mickey Mouse cartoons credited them as "A Walt Disney Comic, drawn by Ub Iwerks". Later Disney Company reissues of the early cartoons tend to credit Walt Disney alone. Wild Waves was also composer Carl Stalling's last film with the Walt Disney Studio. Stalling joined Iwerks at his new studio.

Disney and his remaining staff continued the production of the Mickey series, and he was able to eventually find a number of animators to replace Iwerks. As the Great Depression progressed and Felix the Cat faded from the movie screen, Mickey's popularity would rise, and by 1932 The Mickey Mouse Club would have one million members. At the 5th Academy Awards in 1932, Mickey received his first Academy Award nomination, received for Mickey's Orphans (1931). Walt Disney also received an honorary Academy Award for the creation of Mickey Mouse. Despite being eclipsed by the Silly Symphony short the Three Little Pigs in 1933, Mickey still maintained great popularity among theater audiences too, until 1935, when polls showed that Popeye was more popular than Mickey. By 1934, Mickey merchandise had earned US$600,000 a year ($14.4 million in 2025). In 1935, Disney began to phase out the Mickey Mouse Clubs, due to administration problems.

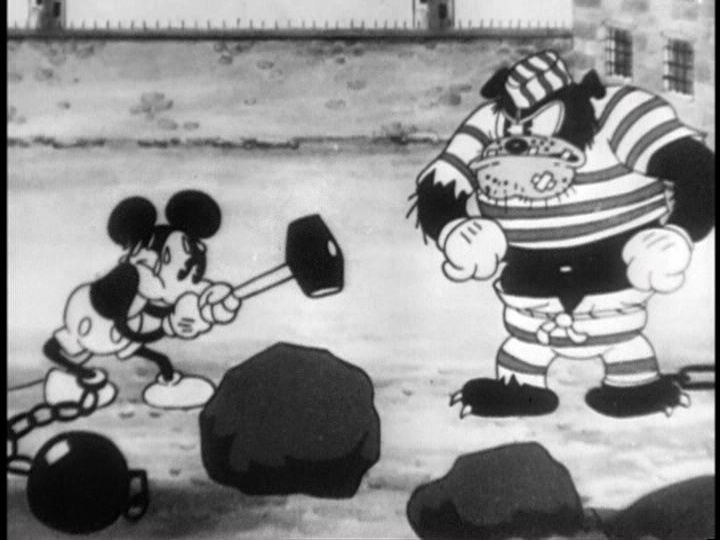
In 1930's The Chain Gang, Mickey plays the role of a prisoner attempting to escape confinement. Morally-dubious roles such as this would quickly become impossible due to the character gaining an image as a role model for children.

About this time, story artists at Disney were finding it increasingly difficult to write material for Mickey. As he had developed into a role model for children, they were limited in the types of gags they could present. This led to Mickey taking more of a secondary role in some of his next films, allowing for more emphasis on other characters. In Orphan's Benefit (1934), Mickey first appeared with Donald Duck who had been introduced earlier that year in the Silly Symphony series. The tempestuous duck would provide Disney with seemingly endless story ideas and would remain a recurring character in Mickey's cartoons.

==== Color films (1935–1953) ====
Mickey in The Band Concert (1935)

Mickey first appeared animated in color in Parade of the Award Nominees in 1932; however, the film strip was created for the 5th Academy Awards ceremony and was not released to the public. Mickey's official first color film came in 1935 with The Band Concert. The Technicolor film process was used in the film production. Here Mickey conducted the William Tell Overture, but the band is swept up by a tornado. It is said that conductor Arturo Toscanini so loved this short that, upon first seeing it, he asked the projectionist to run it again. In 1994, The Band Concert was voted the third-greatest cartoon of all time in a poll of animation professionals. By colorizing and partially redesigning Mickey, Walt put Mickey back on top once again. Mickey reached new heights of popularity. Also in 1935, Walt would receive a special award from the League of Nations for creating Mickey.

The second half of the 1930s saw the character Goofy reintroduced as a series regular. Together, Mickey, Donald Duck, and Goofy would go on several adventures together. Several of the films by the comic trio are some of Mickey's most critically acclaimed films, including Mickey's Fire Brigade (1935), Moose Hunters (1937), Clock Cleaners (1937), Lonesome Ghosts (1937), Boat Builders (1938), and Mickey's Trailer (1938). Also during this era, Mickey was the star in Brave Little Tailor (1938), an adaptation of The Valiant Little Tailor, which was nominated for an Academy Award.

Mickey in Fantasia (1940)

In 1939, Mickey appeared in Mickey's Surprise Party, along with Minnie, with a new design, which gave him smaller, more detailed eyes. In 1940, Mickey appeared in his first feature-length film, Fantasia, which utilized his redesign. His screen role as The Sorcerer's Apprentice, set to the symphonic poem of the same name by Paul Dukas, is perhaps the most famous segment of the film and one of Mickey's most iconic roles. The apprentice (Mickey), not willing to do his chores, puts on the sorcerer's magic hat after the sorcerer goes to bed and casts a spell on a broom, which causes the broom to come to life and perform the most tiring chore—filling up a deep well using two buckets of water. When the well eventually overflows, Mickey finds himself unable to control the broom, leading to a near-flood. After the segment ends, Mickey is seen in silhouette shaking hands with conductor Leopold Stokowski. Mickey has often been pictured in the red robe and blue sorcerer's hat in merchandising. It was also featured into the climax of Fantasmic!, an attraction at the Disney theme parks.

After 1940, Mickey's popularity declined as more comedically versatile characters like Donald Duck, Goofy and even Pluto surpassed him in popularity. Despite this, the character continued to appear regularly in animated shorts, thoùgh often relegated as a supporting character of Pluto. The last regular installment of the Mickey Mouse film series came in 1953 with The Simple Things, after which he appeared exclusively on television for decades.

=== Television and later films ===
Mickey Mouse as he appears in the modern era

In the 1950s, Mickey became better known for his appearances on television, particularly on The Mickey Mouse Club. Many of his theatrical cartoon shorts were re-released on television programs such as Ink & Paint Club, various versions of the Walt Disney anthology television series, as well as on home video. Mickey returned to theatrical animation in 1983 with Mickey's Christmas Carol, an adaptation of Charles Dickens' A Christmas Carol, in which Mickey played Bob Cratchit. This was followed up in 1990 by The Prince and the Pauper.

Throughout the decades, Mickey Mouse competed with Warner Bros.' Bugs Bunny for animated popularity. But in 1988, the two rivals finally shared screen time in the Robert Zemeckis Touchstone Pictures/Amblin Entertainment film Who Framed Roger Rabbit. Disney and Warner signed an agreement stating that each character had the same amount of screen time in the scene.

Similar to his animated inclusion into a live-action film in Roger Rabbit, Mickey made a featured cameo appearance in the 1990 television special The Muppets at Walt Disney World where he met Kermit the Frog. The two are established in the story as having been old friends, although they have not made any other appearance together outside of this.

His most recent theatrical cartoon short was 2013's Get a Horse! which was preceded by 1995's Runaway Brain, while from 1999 to 2004, he appeared in direct-to-video features like Mickey's Once Upon a Christmas, Mickey, Donald, Goofy: The Three Musketeers and Mickey's Twice Upon a Christmas.

Many television series have centered on Mickey, such as the ABC shows Mickey Mouse Works (1999–2000), House of Mouse (2001–2003), Disney Jr.'s Mickey Mouse Clubhouse (2006–2016), Mickey Mouse Mixed-Up Adventures (2017–2021), Mickey Mouse Funhouse (2021–2025), and Mickey Mouse Clubhouse+ (2025–present). Prior to all these, Mickey was also featured as an unseen character in the Bonkers episode "I Oughta Be in Toons".

In 2013, Disney Channel started airing new 3-minute Mickey Mouse shorts, with animator Paul Rudish at the helm, incorporating elements of Mickey's late twenties-early thirties look with a contemporary twist. On November 10, 2020, the series was revived as The Wonderful World of Mickey Mouse and premiered on Disney+. Furthermore, The creative team behind the 2017 DuckTales reboot had hoped to have Mickey Mouse in the series, but this idea was rejected by Disney executives. However, a watermelon bearing Mickey's physical likeness appears in one episode as a ventriloquist dummy companion to Donald Duck.

In August 2018, ABC television announced a two-hour prime time special, Mickey's 90th Spectacular, in honor of Mickey's 90th birthday. The program featured never-before-seen short videos and several other celebrities who wanted to share their memories about Mickey Mouse and performed some of the Disney songs to impress Mickey. The show took place at the Shrine Auditorium in Los Angeles and was produced and directed by Don Mischer on November 4, 2018. On November 18, 2018, a 90th anniversary event for the character was celebrated around the world. In December 2019, both Mickey and Minnie served as special co-hosts of Wheel of Fortune for two weeks while Vanna White served as the main host during Pat Sajak's absence.

Mickey is the subject of the 2022 documentary film Mickey: The Story of a Mouse, directed by Jeff Malmberg. Premiering at the South by Southwest film festival prior to its premiere on the Disney+ streaming service, the documentary examines the history and cultural impact of Mickey Mouse. The feature is accompanied by an original, hand-drawn animated short film starring Mickey titled Mickey in a Minute.

Mickey appeared in Walt Disney Animation Studios' centennial short film, Once Upon a Studio, in which he corrals the characters of Disney's animated features to take a group picture.

=== Comics ===
Mickey and Horace Horsecollar from the Mickey Mouse daily strip; created by Floyd Gottfredson and published December 1932

Mickey first appeared in comics after he had appeared in 15 commercially successful animated shorts and was easily recognized by the public. Walt Disney was approached by King Features Syndicate with the offer to license Mickey and his supporting characters for use in a comic strip. Disney accepted and Mickey Mouse made its first appearance on January 13, 1930. The comical plot was credited to Disney himself, art to Ub Iwerks and inking to Win Smith. The first week or so of the strip featured a loose adaptation of Plane Crazy. Minnie soon became the first addition to the cast. The strips first released between January 13, 1930, and March 31, 1930, have been occasionally reprinted in comic book form under the collective title Lost on a Desert Island. Animation historian Jim Korkis notes, "After the eighteenth strip, Iwerks left and his inker, Win Smith, continued drawing the gag-a-day format."

In early 1930, after Iwerks' departure, Disney was at first content to continue scripting the Mickey Mouse comic strip and assigned the art to Win Smith. However, Disney's primary focus remained animation, and Smith was soon assigned with the scripting as well. Smith was apparently discontent at the prospect of having to script, draw, and ink a series by himself as evidenced by his sudden resignation.

Disney then searched for a replacement among the remaining staff of the Studio. He selected Floyd Gottfredson, a recently hired employee. At the time Gottfredson was reportedly eager to work in animation and somewhat reluctant to accept his new assignment. Disney had to assure him the assignment was only temporary and that he would eventually return to animation. Gottfredson accepted and ended up holding this "temporary" assignment from May 5, 1930, to November 15, 1975.

Walt Disney's last script for the strip appeared May 17, 1930. Gottfredson's first task was to finish the storyline Disney had started on April 1, 1930. The storyline was completed on September 20, 1930, and later reprinted in comic book form as Mickey Mouse in Death Valley. This early adventure expanded the cast of the strip which to this point only included Mickey and Minnie. Among the characters who had their first comic strip appearances in this story were Clarabelle Cow, Horace Horsecollar, and Black Pete as well as the debuts of corrupted lawyer Sylvester Shyster and Minnie's uncle Mortimer Mouse. The Death Valley narrative was followed by Mr. Slicker and the Egg Robbers, first printed between September 22 and December 26, 1930, which introduced Marcus Mouse and his wife as Minnie's parents.

Starting with these two early comic strip stories, Mickey's versions in animation and comics are considered to have diverged from each other. While Disney and his cartoon shorts would continue to focus on comedy, the comic strip effectively combined comedy and adventure. This adventurous version of Mickey would continue to appear in comic strips and later comic books throughout the 20th and into the 21st century.

Floyd Gottfredson left his mark with stories such as Mickey Mouse Joins the Foreign Legion (1936) and The Gleam (1942). He also created the Phantom Blot, Eega Beeva, Morty and Ferdie, Captain Churchmouse, and Butch. Besides Gottfredson artists for the strip over the years included Roman Arambula, Rick Hoover, Manuel Gonzales, Carson Van Osten, Jim Engel, Bill Wright, Ted Thwailes and Daan Jippes; writers included Ted Osborne, Merrill De Maris, Bill Walsh, Dick Shaw, Roy Williams, Del Connell, and Floyd Norman.

The next artist to leave his mark on the character was Paul Murry in Dell Comics. His first Mickey tale appeared in 1950 but Mickey did not become a specialty until Murry's first serial for Walt Disney's Comics and Stories in 1953 ("The Last Resort"). In the same period, Romano Scarpa in Italy for the magazine Topolino began to revitalize Mickey in stories that brought back the Phantom Blot and Eega Beeva along with new creations such as the Atomo Bleep-Bleep. While the stories at Western Publishing during the Silver Age emphasized Mickey as a detective in the style of Sherlock Holmes, in the modern era several editors and creators have consciously undertaken to depict a more vigorous Mickey in the mold of the classic Gottfredson adventures. This renaissance has been spearheaded by Byron Erickson, David Gerstein, Noel Van Horn, Michael T. Gilbert and César Ferioli.

In Europe, Mickey Mouse became the main attraction of a number of comics magazines, the most famous being Topolino in Italy from 1932 onward, Le Journal de Mickey in France from 1934 onward, Don Miki in Spain and the Greek Miky Maous.

Mickey Mouse was the main character for the series MM Mickey Mouse Mystery Magazine, published in Italy from 1999 to 2001.

In 2006, he appeared in the Italian fantasy comic series Wizards of Mickey.

In 1958, Mickey Mouse was introduced to the Arab world through another comic book called "Sameer". He became very popular in Egypt and got a comic book with his name. Mickey's comics in Egypt are licensed by Disney and were published since 1959 by "Dar Al-Hilal" and they were successful, however Dar Al-Hilal stopped the publication in 2003 because of problems with Disney. The comics were re-released by "Nahdat Masr" in 2004 and the first issues were sold out in less than 8 hours.

== Portrayal ==
Mickey is traditionally characterized as a sympathetic underdog with an upbeat attitude to life who gets by on pluck and ingenuity in the face of challenges much bigger than himself. As a mouse, an inherently vulnerable creature, Mickey is often depicted as having minimal resources and attributes at his disposal. Consequently, he must rely on sheer wit to overcome obstacles. The character is frequently pitted against larger-than-life villains to accentuate this idea; namely the hulking cat Pegleg Pete, and numerous one-shot antagonists such as the giants of Giantland (1933) and Brave Little Tailor (1938), the king of cards in Thru the Mirror (1936) and Mortimer Mouse in Mickey's Rival (1936). These adversaries were decidedly portrayed as overbearing figures of authority, thusly painting Mickey as a rebellious hero. When not facing an opponent, Mickey is oft placed in situations where his pursuits of grandeur or simple accomplishment lead to disastrous results, typically at the hands of his own impulsivity, as was the case in The Sorcerer's Apprentice (1940) among others. Mickey is not portrayed as a hero in the traditional sense, instead acting as a subversion of the stock archetype. He often fumbles his way through adventures; his small size and misplaced optimism serving as his dominating flaws. His manner of problem-solving is generally unorthodox to comedic effect; in Ye Olden Days (1933), Mickey's jousting horse was an infantile mule. In Shanghaied (1934), Mickey battled with a broadbill in place of a sword. The underdog nature of Mickey's character has been interpreted by historians as a symbolic reflection of Walt Disney's early struggles as a farm boy breaking into the imposing Hollywood industry in the 1920s. It has also been perceived as an allegory for the Great Depression in the United States, with Mickey's unrelenting optimism symbolizing the "American endurance to survive" in the face of economic woes.

Charlie Chaplin, known by audiences of the time for his role as the "Little Tramp", was identified by Disney as a source of inspiration for the Mickey character. Disney himself was a noted admirer of Chaplin's work, ascribing his development as a storyteller to the actor. In The American Magazine for March 1931, Disney explained, "I think we were rather indebted to Charlie Chaplin for the idea [of Mickey Mouse]. We wanted something appealing and we thought of a tiny bit of a mouse that would have something of the wistfulness of Chaplin ... a little fellow trying to do the best he could." American journalist Alva Johnston noted the similarities between the two figures, stating, "Chaplin was a kind of godfather to Mickey Mouse. It is now and always has been the aim of Disney to graft the psychology of Chaplin upon Mickey. The two universal characters have something in common in their approach to their problems. They have the same blend of hero and coward, nitwit and genius, mug and gentleman."

Besides Chaplin, other notable figures of the silent era have been credited to Mickey's characterization. Chief among them was Douglas Fairbanks, whose swashbuckling screen adventures would inspire Mickey's animated epics. Ub Iwerks wrote in 1970, "He was the super-hero of his day, always winning, gallant and swashbuckling. Mickey's action was in that vein. He was never intended to be a sissy, he was always an adventurous character. I thought of him in that respect, and I had him do naturally the sort of thing Doug Fairbanks would do." Disney was also noted to have been influenced by Fairbanks, along with other screen personalities including Harold Lloyd and Fred Astaire.

An adaptive character, Mickey's personality lends itself to function within a multitude of situations, while retaining core elements of its design. He is not bound to a particular formula or motif, and as such, has been portrayed in a variety of settings and occupational roles. His film series, meanwhile, spans numerous genres besides the traditional musical comedy; The Mad Doctor (1933) and Runaway Brain (1995) parody the horror genre, whereas stories such as Mickey's Good Deed (1932) and The Prince and the Pauper (1990) are largely dramatic works. This versatility is said to have attributed to Mickey's popularity with audiences. As expressed by writer Chelsea Tatham, "From his beginnings, Mickey was able to appeal to a wide audience. He catered to neither the 'highbrow' nor the 'hick,' but the ordinary intelligent picturegoer."

There are a number of catchphrases and colloquialisms associated with the character. Mickey's first spoken words, "Hot dog!" from The Karnival Kid (1929), has endured as a recurring phrase for the character, made especially recognizable to modern audiences for its extensive use in the preschool television program Mickey Mouse Clubhouse. Mickey's signature closing line, "See ya real soon!", is derived from the "Mickey Mouse March" reprise from the original 1955 run of The Mickey Mouse Club ("M-I-C; see you real soon!").

=== Voice actors ===
Between 1929 and 1930, studio staff members would provide Mickey's dialogue and vocal effects for some cartoons. Composer Carl W. Stalling provided lines for Mickey in the 1929 shorts The Karnival Kid and Wild Waves and performed his singing voice in Mickey's Follies. From this point on, Mickey was voiced by Walt Disney himself, being a job in which he appeared to take great personal pride. Helen Lynd filled in for Disney on one occasion in 1930.

Billy Bletcher and Pinto Colvig provided Mickey's mask voice and screams in Mickey's Man Friday. J. Donald Wilson and Joe Twerp provided the voice in some 1938 broadcasts of The Mickey Mouse Theater of the Air, and Ford Banes voiced Mickey briefly in Tugboat Mickey, Pluto's Dream House, The Little Whirlwind, A Gentleman's Gentleman, Canine Caddy, and Mickey and the Seal, although Disney remained Mickey's official voice during this period. However, by 1946, Disney was becoming too busy with running the studio to do regular voice work which meant he could not do Mickey's voice on a regular basis anymore. It is also speculated that his cigarette habit had damaged his voice over the years. After recording the Mickey and the Beanstalk section of Fun and Fancy Free, Mickey's voice was handed over to veteran Disney musician and actor Jimmy MacDonald. Walt would reprise Mickey's voice occasionally until his passing in 1966, such as in the introductions to the original 1955–1959 run of The Mickey Mouse Club TV series, the "Fourth Anniversary Show" episode of the Walt Disney's Disneyland TV series that aired on September 11, 1957, and the Disneyland USA at Radio City Music Hall show from 1962.

MacDonald voiced Mickey in most of the remaining theatrical shorts and for various television and publicity projects up until his retirement in 1976. However, other actors would occasionally play the role during this era. Clarence Nash, the voice of Donald Duck, provided Mickey's voice in four theatrical shorts, Plutopia, R'coon Dawg, Pluto's Party, and Pluto's Christmas Tree. Stan Freberg voiced Mickey in the Freberg-produced record Mickey Mouse's Birthday Party. Alan Young voiced Mickey in the Disneyland record album An Adaptation of Dickens' Christmas Carol, Performed by The Walt Disney Players in 1974.

The 1983 short film Mickey's Christmas Carol marked the theatrical debut of Wayne Allwine as Mickey Mouse, who was the official voice of Mickey from 1977 until his death in 2009, although MacDonald returned to voice Mickey for an appearance at the 50th Academy Awards in 1978. Allwine once recounted something MacDonald had told him about voicing Mickey: "The main piece of advice that Jim gave me about Mickey helped me keep things in perspective. He said, 'Just remember kid, you're only filling in for the boss.' And that's the way he treated doing Mickey for years and years. From Walt, and now from Jimmy." In 1991, Allwine married Russi Taylor, the voice of Minnie Mouse from 1986 until her death in 2019.

Peter Renaday voiced Mickey in many 1970s and 1980s Disney records and albums, such as Yankee Doodle Mickey, Mickey Mouse Splashdance, and several Disney Read-Along titles. He also provided his voice for The Talking Mickey Mouse toy in 1986. Jack Wagner voiced Mickey and other Disney characters in the 1980s, primarily for live entertainment offerings in the parks, Disney on Ice shows, and live-action clips for television. Les Perkins did the voice of Mickey in two TV specials, "Down and Out with Donald Duck" and "DTV Valentine", in the mid-1980s. Quinton Flynn briefly filled in for Allwine as the voice of Mickey in a few episodes of the first season of Mickey Mouse Works whenever Allwine was unavailable to record.

Bret Iwan, a former Hallmark greeting card artist, has been the official voice of Mickey since 2009. Iwan was originally cast as an understudy for Allwine due to the latter's declining health, but Allwine died before Iwan could get a chance to meet him and Iwan became the new official voice of the character at the time. Iwan's early recordings in 2009 included work for the Disney Cruise Line, Mickey toys, the Disney theme parks and the Disney on Ice: Celebrations! ice show. He directly replaced Allwine as Mickey for the Kingdom Hearts video game series and the TV series Mickey Mouse Clubhouse. His first video game voice-over of Mickey Mouse can be heard in Kingdom Hearts: Birth by Sleep. Iwan also became the first voice actor to portray Mickey during Disney's rebranding of the character, providing the vocal effects of Mickey in Epic Mickey as well as his voice lines in Epic Mickey 2: The Power of Two and the remake of Castle of Illusion. An openly gay man, Iwan is the character's first LGBT+ performer.

In addition to Iwan, Chris Diamantopoulos was cast as Mickey for the Mickey Mouse 2013 animated series developed by Paul Rudish, as the producers were looking for a voice closer to Walt Disney's portrayal of the character to match the vintage look of the series. Diamantopoulos is the first voice of Mickey to be nominated for two Emmy Awards and two Annie Awards for his work in the series. He reprised the role in the 2017 DuckTales reboot (in the form of a watermelon that Donald uses as a ventriloquist dummy), the Walt Disney World attraction Mickey & Minnie's Runaway Railway, The Wonderful World of Mickey Mouse, and Once Upon a Studio.

Chris Diamantopoulos reprised his role as Mickey Mouse in The Simpsons promotional crossover short Welcome to the Club, which was produced for Disney+.

== Merchandising ==
Since his early years, Mickey Mouse has been licensed by Disney to appear on many different kinds of merchandise. Mickey was produced as plush toys and figurines, and Mickey's image has graced almost everything from T-shirts to lunchboxes. Largely responsible for early Disney merchandising was Kay Kamen, Disney's head of merchandise and licensing from 1932 until his death in 1949, who was called a "stickler for quality". Kamen was recognized by the Walt Disney Company as having a significant part in Mickey's rise to stardom and was named a Disney Legend in 1998. At the time of his 80th-anniversary celebration in 2008, Time declared Mickey Mouse one of the world's most recognized characters, even when compared against Santa Claus. Disney officials have stated that 98% of children aged 3–11 around the world are at least aware of the character. Disney expected the Mickey Mouse & Friends brand to make $9 billion in retail sales in 2011.

=== Disney parks ===
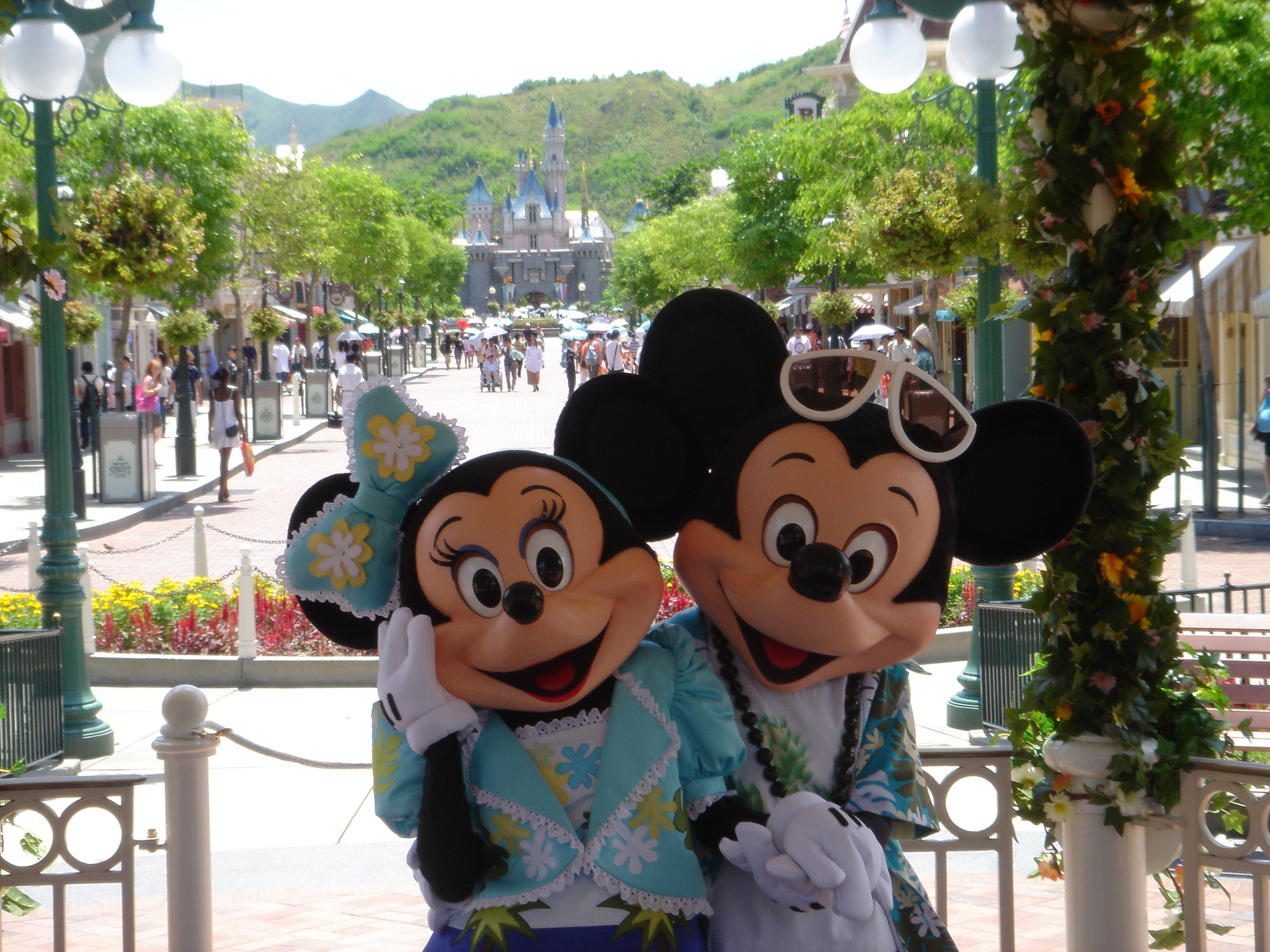
Minnie and Mickey at Hong Kong Disneyland

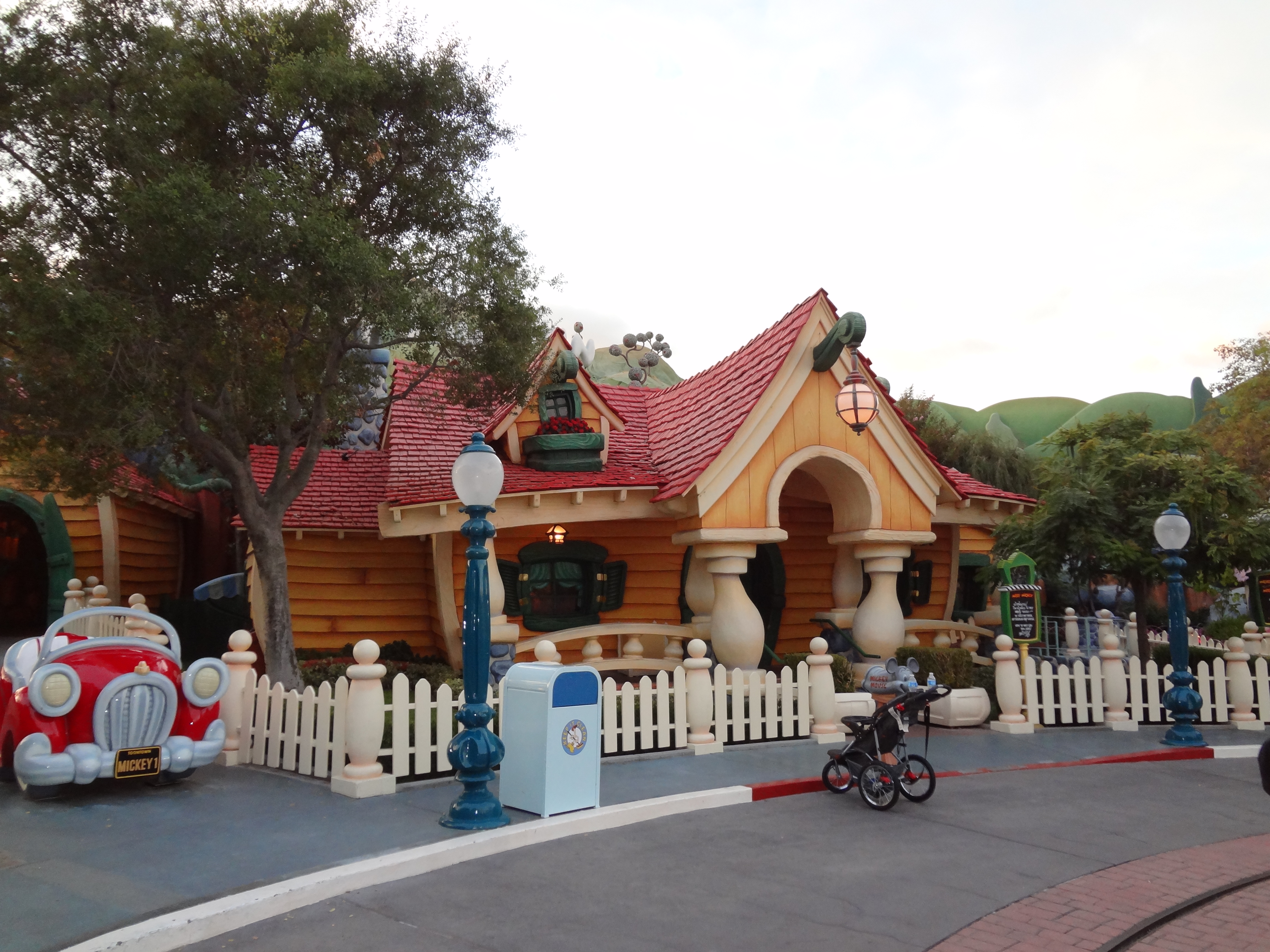
Mickey's house at Mickey's Toontown

As the official Walt Disney mascot, Mickey has played a central role in the Disney parks since the opening of Disneyland in 1955. As with other characters, Mickey is often portrayed by a non-speaking costumed actor. In this form, he has participated in ceremonies and countless parades, and poses for photographs with guests. As of the presidency of Barack Obama (who jokingly referred to him as "a world leader who has bigger ears than me") Mickey has met every U.S. president since Harry Truman, with the exception of Lyndon B. Johnson.

Mickey also features in several specific attractions at the Disney parks. Mickey's Toontown (Disneyland and Tokyo Disneyland) is a themed land which is a recreation of Mickey's neighborhood. Buildings are built in a cartoon style and guests can visit Mickey or Minnie's houses, Donald Duck's boat, or Goofy's garage. This is a common place to meet the characters.

Mickey's PhilharMagic (Magic Kingdom, Tokyo Disneyland, Hong Kong Disneyland, Disney California Adventure) is a 4D film which features Mickey in the familiar role of symphony conductor. At Main Street Cinema several of Mickey's short films are shown on a rotating basis; the sixth film is always Steamboat Willie. Mickey plays a central role in Fantasmic! (Disneyland Resort, Disney's Hollywood Studios) a live nighttime show which famously features Mickey in his role as the Sorcerer's Apprentice. Mickey was also a central character in the now-defunct Mickey Mouse Revue (Magic Kingdom, Tokyo Disneyland) which was an indoor show featuring animatronic characters. Mickey's face formerly graced the Mickey's Fun Wheel (now Pixar Pal-A-Round) at Disney California Adventure Park, where a figure of him also stands on top of Silly Symphony Swings.

Mickey & Minnie's Runaway Railway at Disney's Hollywood Studios is a trackless dark ride themed to Mickey Mouse.

In addition to Mickey's overt presence in the parks, numerous images of him are also subtly included in sometimes unexpected places. This phenomenon is known as "Hidden Mickeys", involving hidden images in Disney films, theme parks, and merchandise.

=== Video games ===
Mickey has starred in many video games, including Mickey Mousecapade on the Nintendo Entertainment System, Mickey Mania: The Timeless Adventures of Mickey Mouse, Mickey's Ultimate Challenge, and Disney's Magical Quest on the Super Nintendo Entertainment System, Castle of Illusion Starring Mickey Mouse on the Mega Drive/Genesis, Mickey Mouse: Magic Wands! on the Game Boy, and many others. In the 2000s, the Disney's Magical Quest series were ported to the Game Boy Advance, while Mickey made his sixth generation era debut in Disney's Magical Mirror Starring Mickey Mouse, a GameCube title aimed at younger audiences. Mickey plays a major role in the Kingdom Hearts series, where he is depicted as a Keyblade Master and the king of Disney Castle. Epic Mickey, featuring a darker version of the Disney universe, was released in 2010 for the Wii. The game is part of an effort by the Walt Disney Company to re-brand the Mickey Mouse character by moving away from his current squeaky clean image and reintroducing the mischievous side of his personality. Mickey Mouse is a playable character in the mobile game Disney Heroes: Battle Mode.

=== Watches and clock ===
Mickey was famously featured on wristwatches and alarm clocks, typically utilizing his hands as the actual hands on the face of the clock. The first Mickey Mouse watches were manufactured in 1933 by the Ingersoll Watch Company. The seconds were indicated by a turning disk below Mickey. The first Mickey watch was sold at the Century of Progress in Chicago, 1933 for $3.75 (equivalent to $93 in 2025). Mickey Mouse watches have been sold by other companies and designers throughout the years, including Timex, Elgin, Helbros, Bradley, Lorus, and Gérald Genta. The fictional character Robert Langdon from Dan Brown's novels was said to wear a Mickey Mouse watch as a reminder "to stay young at heart."

=== Other products ===
In 1989, Milton Bradley released the electronic talking game titled Mickey Says, with three modes featuring Mickey Mouse as its host. Mickey also appeared in other toys and games, including the Worlds of Wonder released The Talking Mickey Mouse.

Fisher-Price has produced a line of talking animatronic Mickey dolls including "Dance Star Mickey" (2010) and "Rock Star Mickey" (2011).

In total, approximately 40% of Disney's revenues for consumer products are derived from Mickey Mouse merchandise, with revenues peaking in 1997.

== Social impact ==
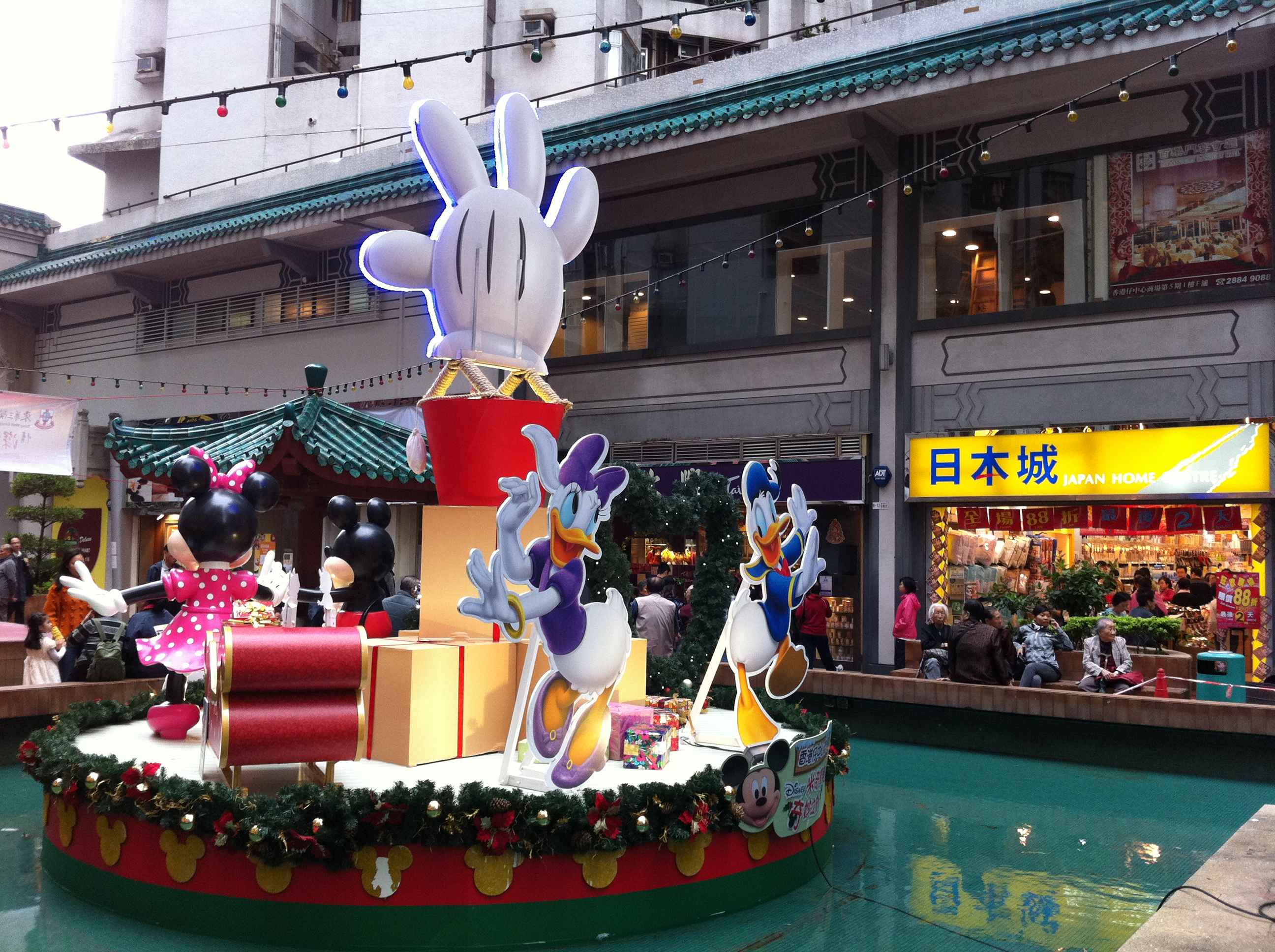
A display in Asia highlighting the iconic white glove

The silhouette of Mickey Mouse's head has become an iconic image.

In 2008, Time named Mickey one of the world's most famous cultural symbols of the 20th and 21st centuries.

The LMS Ivatt Class 2 2-6-2T, a class of 2-6-2 tank locomotives, became known as the "Mickey Mouse tanks" because the circular route indicator discs on either side of the smokebox resemble Mickey Mouse's ears.

=== Use in protest votes ===
In the U.S., protest votes are often made to indicate dissatisfaction with the slate of candidates presented on a particular ballot or to highlight the inadequacies of a particular voting procedure. Since most states' electoral systems do not provide for blank balloting or a choice of "None of the Above", most protest votes take the form of a clearly non-serious candidate's name entered as a write-in vote. Mickey Mouse is often selected for this purpose. As an election supervisor in Georgia observed, "If Mickey Mouse doesn't get votes in our election, it's a bad election." The earliest known mention of Mickey Mouse as a write-in candidate dates back to the 1932 New York City mayoral elections.

Mickey Mouse's name has also been known to appear fraudulently on voter registration lists, such as in the 2008 U.S. presidential election.

=== Pejorative use of Mickey's name ===
"Mickey Mouse" is a slang expression meaning small-time, amateurish or trivial. In the United Kingdom and Ireland, it also means poor quality or counterfeit. In Poland the phrase "mały Miki", which translates to "small Mickey", means something very simple and trivial – usually used in the comparison between two things. However, in parts of Australia it can mean excellent or very good (rhyming slang for "grouse"). Examples of the negative usages include the following:

- From 1942 to 1945, during the Japanese occupation of the Philippines in World War II, the occupying Japanese government issued a new fiat currency which drastically decreased in value towards the war. As a result of hyperinflation, Filipinos at the time would refer to the currency in scorn as "Mickey Mouse money".
- In The Godfather Part II, Fredo's justification of betraying Michael is that his orders in the family usually were "Send Fredo off to do this, send Fredo off to do that! Let Fredo take care of some Mickey Mouse nightclub somewhere!" as opposed to more meaningful tasks.
- In an early episode of the 1978–82 sitcom Mork & Mindy, Mork stated that Pluto was "a Mickey Mouse planet", referring to the future dwarf planet having the same name as Mickey's pet dog Pluto.
- On November 19, 1983, just after an ice hockey game in which Wayne Gretzky's Edmonton Oilers beat the New Jersey Devils 13–4, Gretzky was quoted as saying to a reporter, "Well, it's time they got their act together, they're ruining the whole league. They had better stop running a Mickey Mouse organization and put somebody on the ice". Reacting to Gretzky's comment, Devils fans wore Mickey Mouse apparel when the Oilers returned to New Jersey on January 15, 1984, despite a 5–4 Devils loss.
- In the 1996 Warner Bros. film Space Jam, Bugs Bunny derogatorily comments on Daffy Duck's idea for the name of their basketball team, asking: "What kind of Mickey Mouse organization would name a team 'The Ducks?'" (This also referenced the Mighty Ducks of Anaheim, an NHL team that was then owned by Disney, as well as the Disney-made The Mighty Ducks movie franchise. This was referencing the Disney/Warner Brothers rivalry.)
- In schools a "Mickey Mouse course", "Mickey Mouse major", or "Mickey Mouse degree" is a class, college major, or degree where very little effort is necessary to attain a good grade (especially an A) or one where the subject matter of such a class is not of any importance in the labor market.
- In British football, the term "Mickey Mouse cup" is used to describe competitions that are regarded with lesser prestige than others. It has been used to describe elimination-based season competitions like the EFL Cup or the FIFA Club World Cup, as well as single-match trophies such as the FA Community Shield or UEFA Super Cup.
- In the beginning of the 1980s, then-British prime minister Margaret Thatcher once called the European Parliament a "Mickey Mouse parliament", meaning a discussion club without influence.

Additionally, the term "Mickey Mousing" refers to the exact synching of a film score to each action depicted onscreen, in reference to the early cartoons that used this technique. Although not inherently a pejorative term, the technique has long fallen out of fashion, and the term has taken on a secondary meaning indicating material interpreted as being too simplistic for its target audience.

=== Parodies and criticism ===
The 1969 underground protest cartoon Mickey Mouse in Vietnam

Mickey Mouse's global fame has made him both a symbol of the Walt Disney Company and of the United States itself. For this reason, Mickey has been used frequently in anti-establishment or anti-American satire, such as the infamous underground cartoon Mickey Mouse in Vietnam (1969) and the Palestinian children's propaganda series Tomorrow's Pioneers where a Mickey Mouse-esque character named Farfour is used to promote Islamic extremism. There have been numerous parodies of Mickey Mouse, such as the two-page parody "Mickey Rodent" by Will Elder (published in Mad #19, 1955) in which the mouse walks around unshaven and jails Donald Duck out of jealousy over the duck's larger popularity. In The Simpsons Movie, Bart Simpson puts a black bra on his head to mimic Mickey Mouse and says: "I'm the mascot of an evil corporation!" The Simpsons would later become Disney property as its distributor Fox was acquired by Disney. In the Comedy Central series South Park, Mickey (voiced by Trey Parker) serves as a recurring antagonist, depicted as the sadistic, greedy, and foul-mouthed boss of the Walt Disney Company. He also appears briefly with Donald Duck in the comic Squeak the Mouse by Italian cartoonist Massimo Mattioli.

Mickey Mouse has also been particularly commented upon in the context of fascism and antisemitism in Germany. A pro-Nazi newspaper in the mid-1930s denounced Disney's use of "the greatest bacteria carrier in the animal kingdom" as evidence of the "Jewish brutalization of the people". Artist Horst Rosenthal created a comic book, Mickey au Camp de Gurs (Mickey Mouse in the Gurs Internment Camp) while detained in the Gurs internment camp, subtitled "Publié Sans Autorisation de Walt Disney" ("Published without Walt Disney's Permission"); Rosenthal's Mickey names Walt Disney as his father, but is sorted into the camps as a Jew after being unable to name a mother, a seeming parody of both Disney's rumoured antisemitism and of the American public's ignorance around racial divisions in Europe. Cartoonist Art Spiegelman adapted Nazi descriptions of Jews as rodents and vermin for his graphic novel Maus; The original three-page strip uses a young Mickey Mouse as a stand-in for Spiegelman, listening to tales of "Mauschwitz" and the Holocaust told by his father Vladek. The full 1991 adaptation of the strip uses a comparatively direct anthropomorphization of Spiegelman, but otherwise continues to use Mickey Mouse imagery to connect contemporary America to the genocide.

In the 1969 parody novel Bored of the Rings, Mickey Mouse is satirized as Dickey Dragon.

== Legal issues ==
The early design of Mickey Mouse is one of the most notable works that entered the public domain in 2024. The Walt Disney Company had previously lobbied for the extension of copyright length in the U.S. and other countries to prevent this character and others from entering the public domain, resulting in the Copyright Term Extension Act.

Although the earliest designs of Mickey Mouse entered the public domain in 2024, the character, like all major Disney characters, remains trademarked by Disney. Trademarks last for as long as it continues to be used commercially by its owner. So, while people are free to use early designs of Mickey Mouse, there are still limitations due to him being trademarked. For example, the character cannot be referred to as "Mickey Mouse" without permission, nor can the early designs be used "in a way that misleads consumers into thinking your work is produced or sponsored by Disney".

Between 1991 and 1998, the Walt Disney Company filed a trademark infringement complaint against the Paraguayan Mickey brand whose logo shares similarities with Mickey Mouse. Ultimately, Disney lost the case as Mickey SRL had continuously used the trademark since 1956 without prior complaint.

Due to the Copyright Term Extension Act of the United States (sometimes called the "Mickey Mouse Protection Act" because of extensive lobbying by the Disney corporation) and similar legislation within the European Union and other jurisdictions where copyright terms have been extended, the early Steamboat Willie version of Mickey Mouse cartoons remained under copyright until the end of 2023. The 1928 version of Mickey entered the U.S. public domain at the start of 2024: (Note: Attributed to multiple sources:) all works featuring Mickey Mouse published before 1931 are in the public domain as of 2026.

Copyright scholars have argued that Disney's copyright on the earliest version of the character may have been invalid due to ambiguity in the copyright notice for Steamboat Willie.

The Walt Disney Company is well known for zealously protecting its trademark on Mickey Mouse—whose likeness is synonymous and closely associated with the company. In 1989, Disney threatened legal action against three daycare centers in the Orlando, Florida region (where Walt Disney World is a dominant employer) for having Mickey Mouse and other Disney characters painted on their walls. The characters were removed, and the newly opened rival Universal Studios Florida allowed the centers to use their own cartoon characters with their blessing, to build community goodwill.

=== Walt Disney Productions v. Air Pirates ===
In 1971, a group of underground cartoonists calling themselves the Air Pirates, after a group of villains from early Mickey Mouse films, produced a comic called Air Pirates Funnies. In the first issue, cartoonist Dan O'Neill depicted Mickey and Minnie Mouse engaging in explicit sexual behavior and consuming drugs. As O'Neill explained, "The air pirates were...some sort of bizarre concept to steal the air, pirate the air, steal the media....Since we were cartoonists, the logical thing was Disney." Rather than change the appearance or name of the character, which O'Neill felt would dilute the parody, the mouse depicted in Air Pirates Funnies looks like and is named "Mickey Mouse". Disney sued for copyright infringement, and after a series of appeals, O'Neill eventually lost and was ordered to pay Disney $1.9 million. The outcome of the case remains controversial among free-speech advocates. New York Law School professor Edward Samuels said, "The Air Pirates set parody back twenty years."

=== Copyright status ===
Prior to 2024, there had been multiple attempts in the U.S. to argue that certain versions of Mickey Mouse were in fact in the public domain. In the 1980s, archivist George S. Brown attempted to recreate and sell cels from the 1933 short The Mad Doctor, on the theory that they were in the public domain because Disney had failed to renew the copyright as required by current law. However, Disney successfully sued Brown to prevent such sale, arguing that the lapse in copyright for The Mad Doctor did not put Mickey Mouse in the public domain because of the copyright in the earlier films. Brown attempted to appeal, noting imperfections in the earlier copyright claims, but the court dismissed his argument as untimely.

In 1999, Lauren Vanpelt, a law student at Arizona State University, wrote a paper making a similar argument. Vanpelt points out that copyright law at the time required a copyright notice specify the year of the copyright and the copyright owner's name. The title cards to early Mickey Mouse films Steamboat Willie, Plane Crazy, and Gallopin' Gaucho do not clearly identify the copyright owner, and also misidentify the copyright year. However, Vanpelt notes that copyright cards in other early films may have been done correctly, which could make Mickey Mouse "protected as a component part of the larger copyrighted films".

A 2003 article by Douglas A. Hedenkamp in the Virginia Sports and Entertainment Law Journal analyzed Vanpelt's arguments, and concluded that she is likely correct. Hedenkamp provided additional arguments, and identified some errors in Vanpelt's paper, but still found that due to imperfections in the copyright notice on the title cards, Walt Disney forfeited his copyright in Mickey Mouse. He concluded: "The forfeiture occurred at the moment of publication, and the law of that time was clear: publication without proper notice irrevocably forfeited copyright protection." Disney threatened to sue Hedenkamp for slander of title, but did not follow through. The claims in Vanpelt and Hedenkamp's articles have not been tested in court.

In a 2023 episode of Last Week Tonight with John Oliver, John Oliver suggested that without copyright protection to stop the unauthorized use of Mickey Mouse, the Walt Disney Company would likely use trademark law to achieve the same results, potentially arguing that Mickey Mouse is so closely associated with their brand that any unauthorized use would cause consumer confusion. Oliver then revealed that Last Week Tonight's opening titles had been using an image from Steamboat Willie since the start of the season and that he would begin to use his own version of Mickey Mouse as a mascot of the show. He stated:

We are staking our claim to Mickey Mouse right now and, I know Disney's lawyers might argue that this Mickey is closely associated with their brand, although they should know that he's pretty associated with our brand now too.

On January 1, 2024, the copyrights of the first three animated Mickey Mouse cartoons and their portrayal of Mickey Mouse expired in the U.S., and they entered the public domain. They are the silent versions of the cartoons Plane Crazy and The Gallopin' Gaucho, as well as the sound cartoon Steamboat Willie. (Note: While the silent version of Plane Crazy became public domain in the U.S., that version is not known to be extant. The widely released sound version remained under copyright in the U.S. until 2025.) Newer versions of Mickey Mouse remain copyright-protected.

Quinton Hoover, a YouTube user who uploaded a copy of Steamboat Willie after its U.S. copyright expired on January 1, 2024, noted that three attempts to upload the short to the service triggered copyright claims from Disney, including one that claimed a copyright on the short's soundtrack. Users of Twitch noted similar behavior in that attempts to stream Steamboat Willie would end up with the audio muted. Disney withdrew a separate copyright strike from a different uploader shortly after it was challenged.

=== Censorship ===
In 1930, the German Board of Film Censors prohibited any presentations of the 1929 Mickey Mouse cartoon The Barnyard Battle. The animated short, which features the mouse as a kepi-wearing soldier fighting cat enemies in German-style helmets, was viewed by censors as a negative portrayal of Germany. It was claimed by the board that the film would "reawaken the latest anti-German feeling existing abroad since the War". The Barnyard Battle incident did not incite wider anti-Mickey sentiment in Germany in 1930; however, after Adolf Hitler came to power several years later, the Nazi regime unambiguously propagandized against Disney. A mid-1930s German newspaper article read:

Mickey Mouse is the most miserable ideal ever revealed. Healthy emotions tell every independent young man and every honorable youth that the dirty and filth-covered vermin, the greatest bacteria carrier in the animal kingdom, cannot be the ideal type of animal. Away with Jewish brutalization of the people! Down with Mickey Mouse! Wear the Swastika Cross!

American cartoonist and writer Art Spiegelman would later use this quote on the opening page of the second volume of his graphic novel Maus.

In 1935, Romanian authorities also banned Mickey Mouse films from cinemas, purportedly fearing that children would be "scared to see a ten-foot mouse in the movie theatre". In 1938, based on the Ministry of Popular Culture's recommendation that a reform was necessary "to raise children in the firm and imperialist spirit of the Fascist revolution", the Italian Government banned foreign children's literature except Mickey; Disney characters were exempted from the decree for the "acknowledged artistic merit" of Disney's work. Actually, Mussolini's children were fond of Mickey Mouse, so they managed to delay his ban as long as possible. In 1942, after Italy declared war on the U.S., Italian publishers were forced to stop printing any Disney stories. Mickey's stories were replaced by the adventures of Tuffolino, a new human character that looked like Mickey, created by Federico Pedrocchi (script) and Pier Lorenzo De Vita (art). After the downfall of Italy's fascist government in 1945, the ban was removed.

== Filmography ==
=== Selected short films ===
- Steamboat Willie (1928)
- Plane Crazy (1928)
- The Karnival Kid (1929)
- Mickey's Orphans (1931)
- Building a Building (1933)
- The Mad Doctor (1933)
- The Band Concert (1935)
- Thru the Mirror (1936)
- Moving Day (1936)
- Clock Cleaners (1937)
- Lonesome Ghosts (1937)
- Brave Little Tailor (1938)
- The Pointer (1939)
- The Nifty Nineties (1941)
- Lend a Paw (1941)
- Symphony Hour (1942)
- Squatter's Rights (1946)
- Mickey and the Seal (1948)
- The Simple Things (1953)
- Mickey's Christmas Carol (1983)
- Runaway Brain (1995)
- Get a Horse! (2013)
- Once Upon a Studio (2023)

=== Full-length films ===
- Hollywood Party (cameo, 1934)
- Fantasia (1940)
- Fun and Fancy Free (1947)
- Who Framed Roger Rabbit (cameo, 1988)
- A Goofy Movie (cameo, 1995)
- Mickey's Once Upon a Christmas (1999) (DTV)
- Fantasia 2000 (1999)
- Mickey's Magical Christmas (2001) (DTV)
- Mickey's House of Villains (2002) (DTV)
- Mickey, Donald, Goofy: The Three Musketeers (2004) (DTV)
- Mickey's Twice Upon a Christmas (2004) (DTV)

(Note: DTV means Direct-to-video)

=== Television series ===
- The Mickey Mouse Club (1955–1959; 1977–1979)
- Mickey Mouse Works (1999–2000)
- House of Mouse (2001–2003)
- Mickey Mouse Clubhouse (2006–2016)
- Mickey Mouse (2013–2019)
- Mickey Mouse Mixed-Up Adventures (2017–2021) (Note: The first two seasons were titled Mickey and the Roadster Racers.)
- The Wonderful World of Mickey Mouse (2020–2023)
- Mickey Mouse Funhouse (2021–2025)
- Mickey Mouse Clubhouse+ (2025–present)

== Awards and honors ==
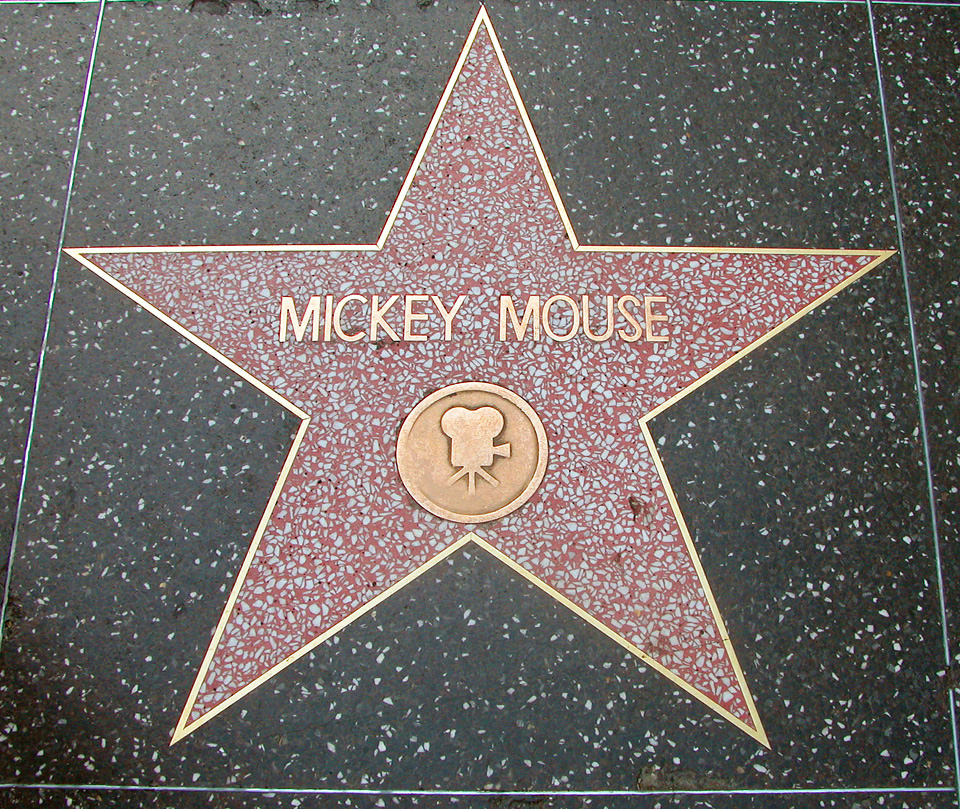
Mickey's star on the Hollywood Walk of Fame

Mickey Mouse has received ten nominations for the Academy Award for Best Animated Short Film. These are Mickey's Orphans (1931), Building a Building (1933), Brave Little Tailor (1938), The Pointer (1939), Lend a Paw (1941), Squatter's Rights (1946), Mickey and the Seal (1948), Mickey's Christmas Carol (1983), Runaway Brain (1995), and Get a Horse! (2013). Among these, Lend a Paw was the only film to actually win the award. Additionally, in 1932 Walt Disney received an honorary Academy Award in recognition of Mickey's creation.

In 1994, four of Mickey's cartoons were included in the book The 50 Greatest Cartoons which listed the greatest cartoons of all time as voted by members of the animation field. The films were The Band Concert (#3), Steamboat Willie (#13), Brave Little Tailor (#26), and Clock Cleaners (#27).

On November 18, 1978, in honor of his 50th anniversary, Mickey became the first cartoon character to have a star on the Hollywood Walk of Fame. The star is located on 6925 Hollywood Blvd.

Melbourne (Australia) runs the annual Moomba festival street procession and appointed Mickey Mouse as their King of Moomba (1977). Although immensely popular with children, there was controversy with the appointment: some Melburnians wanted a "home-grown" choice, e.g. Blinky Bill; when it was revealed that Patricia O'Carroll (from Disneyland's Disney on Parade show) was performing the mouse, Australian newspapers reported "Mickey Mouse is really a girl!"

Mickey was the Grand Marshal of the Tournament of Roses Parade on New Year's Day 2005. He was the first cartoon character to receive the honor and only the second fictional character after Kermit the Frog in 1996.

== See also ==
- Mickey Mouse Adventures, a short-lived comic starring Mickey Mouse as the protagonist
- Mouse Museum, a Russian museum featuring artifacts and memorabilia relating to Mickey Mouse
- Walt Disney (2015 PBS film)
