= Michael Sahl =

American composer

- Born: September 2, 1934; Boston, Massachusetts, U.S.
- Died: March 29, 2018 (aged 83); New York City, U.S.
- Education: Amherst College, Princeton University
- Occupations: Composer, Pianist, Music director

Michael Sahl (September 2, 1934 – March 29, 2018) was an American composer, pianist, and music director known for his eclectic and polystylistic approach to music.

== Early life and education ==
Sahl was born in Boston, Massachusetts. He earned a B.A. from Amherst College in 1955 and an M.F.A. from Princeton University in 1957, studying under Milton Babbitt and Roger Sessions. He later studied with Luigi Dallapiccola in Florence on a Fulbright fellowship, and with composers including Israel Citkowitz, Lukas Foss, and Aaron Copland.

== Career ==
In the 1960s, Sahl began composing film scores and served as a creative associate at the State University of New York at Buffalo. He was pianist and music director for Judy Collins (1968–69) and later music director of WBAI-FM in New York City (1972–73). During his tenure, Sahl served as producer of the station's Free Music Store concert series, which featured experimental and contemporary performances.

Sahl began collaborating with Eric Salzman during their graduate studies in composition at Princeton University, forming an alliance that would span decades and produce numerous music theater works. Their joint works include Biograffiti (1974), The Conjuror (1975), and Civilization and Its Discontents (1977), which won the Prix Italia in 1980. They also co-authored Making Changes: A Practical Guide to Vernacular Harmony (1977), which explored accessible approaches to musical composition.

== Musical style ==
Sahl's music is characterized by its polystylistic nature, combining jazz chords, romantic melodies, electric instruments, and influences from rock, tango, and blues. His rejection of serialism and academic elitism led him to develop a populist style that resonated with broader audiences. Music critic Kyle Gann coined the term “Sahlesque” to describe this unique aesthetic.

== Selected works ==
=== Dramatic works ===
- Biograffiti (1974)
- The Conjuror (1975)
- Civilization and Its Discontents (1977)
- Boxes (1982–83)
- Dream Beach (1988)
- Body Language (1995–96)

=== Orchestral and chamber music ===
- Five symphonies (1971–1983)
- Violin Concerto (1974)
- String Quartet (1969)
- Piano Sonata (1972)
- Doina for Violin, Piano, Double Bass, and Drums (1979)
- Jungles for Electric Violin, Electric Guitar, Piano, Double Bass, and Drums (1992)
