= Micki =

Micki is a given name. Notable people with the name include:

- Micki Dickoff, American film director and producer
- Micki DuPont (born 1980), Canadian ice hockey player
- Micki Free (born 1955), American musician
- Micki Grant (1929–2021), American singer, actress, writer and composer
- Addie "Micki" Harris (1941–1982), member of the all-girl singing group The Shirelles
- Micki Hirschl (1906–1991), Austrian wrestler
- Micki King (born 1944), American diver and diving coach
- Micki Marlo (1928–2016), American model and singer
- Micki McElya (born 1972), American author and historian
- Micki Meuser, German musician
- Micki Nielsen (born 1993), Danish boxer
- Micki Pistorius (born 1961), South African forensic psychologist
- Micki Schillig (born 1960), American tennis player
- Michael Steele (musician) (born 1955), bassist, guitarist, songwriter, and singer, known as Micki Steele while with The Runaways

== See also ==
- Micky/Mickie
