= Nino Rota =

Italian composer (1911–1979)

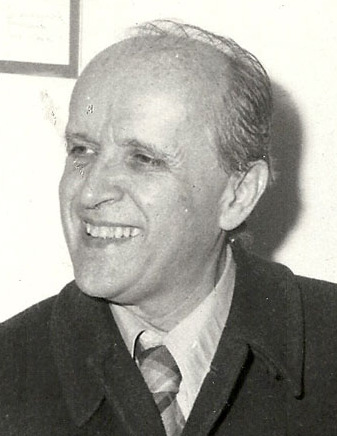
- Rota in 1976
- Born: Giovanni Rota Rinaldi; 3 December 1911; Milan, Kingdom of Italy
- Died: 10 April 1979 (aged 67); Rome, Italy
- Occupations: Composer; pianist; conductor; academic
- Partner: Magdalena Longari
- Children: 1
- Website: ninorota.com

Giovanni "Nino" Rota Rinaldi (/ˈroʊtə/; Italian: [dʒoˈvanni ˈniːno ˈrɔːta riˈnaldi]; 3 December 1911 – 10 April 1979) was an Italian composer, pianist, conductor and academic who is best known for his film scores, notably for the films of Federico Fellini and Luchino Visconti. He also composed the music for two of Franco Zeffirelli's Shakespeare screen adaptations, and for the first two installments of Francis Ford Coppola's The Godfather trilogy, earning the Academy Award for Best Original Score for The Godfather Part II (1974).

During his long career, Rota was a highly prolific composer, especially of cinematic music. He wrote more than 150 scores for Italian and international productions from the 1930s until his death in 1979 – an average of three scores each year over a 46-year period, and in his most productive period from the late 1940s to the mid-1950s he wrote as many as ten scores every year, and sometimes more, with a remarkable thirteen film scores to his credit in 1954. Alongside this great body of film work, he composed ten operas, five ballets and dozens of other orchestral, choral and chamber works, the best known being his string concerto. He also composed the music for many theatre productions by Visconti, Zeffirelli and Eduardo De Filippo as well as maintaining a long teaching career at the Liceo Musicale in Bari, Italy, where he was the director for almost 30 years.

== Early career ==
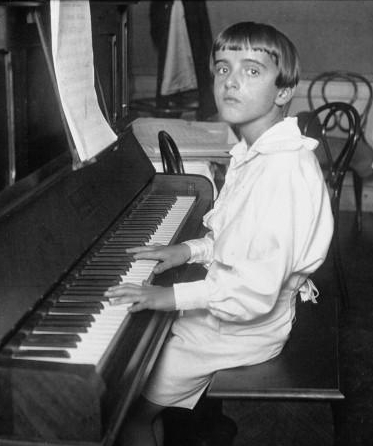
Rota at age 12

Giovanni Rota Rinaldi was born on 3 December 1911 into a musical family in Milan, Italy. Rota was a renowned child prodigy – his first oratorio, L'infanzia di San Giovanni Battista, was written at age 11 and performed in Milan and Paris as early as 1923; his three-act lyrical comedy after Hans Christian Andersen, Il Principe Porcaro, was composed when he was just 13 and published in 1926. He studied at the Milan Conservatory there under Giacomo Orefice and then undertook serious study of composition under Ildebrando Pizzetti and Alfredo Casella at the Conservatorio Santa Cecilia in Rome, graduating in 1930.

Encouraged by Arturo Toscanini, Rota moved to the United States, where he lived from 1930 to 1932. He won a scholarship to the Curtis Institute of Philadelphia, where he was taught conducting by Fritz Reiner and had Rosario Scalero as an instructor in composition. Returning to Milan, he wrote a thesis on the Renaissance composer Gioseffo Zarlino. Rota earned a degree in literature from the University of Milan, graduating in 1937, and began a teaching career that led to the directorship of the Liceo Musicale in Bari, a title he held from 1950 until 1978.

== Film scores ==
Nino Rota wrote scores for more than 150 films. These included the score for The Glass Mountain in 1949, which was notable for the singing of Tito Gobbi. The film won a number of awards.

In his entry on Rota in the 1988 edition of The Concise Baker's Biographical Dictionary of Composers and Musicians, music scholar Nicolas Slonimsky described him as "brilliant" and stated that his musical style:

demonstrates a great facility and even felicity, with occasional daring excursions into dodecaphony. However, his most durable compositions are related to his music for the cinema; he composed the soundtracks of a great number of films by the Italian director Federico Fellini covering the period from 1950 to 1979.

One of Rota's compositional habits, however, came up for disapproving remarks: his penchant for pastiche of various past styles, which quite often turned into outright quotation of his own earlier music or even others' music. One of the most noticed examples of such incorporation is his use of the Larghetto from Dvorák's Serenade for Strings in E major as a theme for a character in Fellini's La Strada.

During the 1940s, Rota composed scores for more than 32 films, including Renato Castellani's Zaza (1944). His association with Fellini began with Lo Sceicco Bianco (The White Sheik) (1952), followed by I Vitelloni (1953) and La Strada (The Road) (1954). They continued to work together for decades, and Fellini recalled:

The most precious collaborator I have ever had, I say it straightaway and don't even have to hesitate, was Nino Rota — between us, immediately, a complete, total harmony ... He had a geometric imagination, a musical approach worthy of celestial spheres. He thus had no need to see images from my movies. When I asked him about the melodies he had in mind to comment on one sequence or another, I clearly realized he was not concerned with images at all. His world was inner, inside himself, and reality had no way to enter it.

The relationship between Fellini and Rota was so strong that at Fellini's funeral Giulietta Masina, Fellini's wife, asked trumpeter Mauro Maur to play Rota's Improvviso dell'Angelo in the Basilica di Santa Maria degli Angeli e dei Martiri in Rome.

Rota's score for Fellini's 8½ (1963) is often cited as one of the factors that makes the film cohesive. His score for Fellini's Juliet of the Spirits (1965) included a collaboration with Eugene Walter on the song, "Go Milk the Moon" (cut from the final version of the film), and they teamed again for the song "What Is a Youth?", part of Rota's score for Franco Zeffirelli's Romeo and Juliet.

The American Film Institute ranked Rota's score for The Godfather number 5 on their list of the greatest film scores. After being nominated for an Academy Award for this score, the nomination was later revoked when it was discovered that Rota recycled a theme from a previous score, one he wrote two decades prior for the film Fortunella and thus no longer considered original despite being played differently. The nomination was then given to the film Sleuth, while Charlie Chaplin and two co-authors for their score featured in Limelight, a 21-year-old film that had just become eligible because it had not been screened in Los Angeles until 1972, went on to win the award. He went on to win an Oscar for his score for The Godfather Part II. His score for War and Peace was also nominated for the list.

Rota's work in film scores is referenced in the song "Reno Dakota" on the album 69 Love Songs by The Magnetic Fields.

== Orchestral, chamber and choral music ==
Rota wrote numerous concerti and other orchestral works as well as piano, chamber and choral music, much of which has been recorded and released on CD. After his death from heart failure in 1979, Rota's music was the subject of Hal Willner's 1981 tribute album Amarcord Nino Rota, which featured several jazz musicians who were relatively unknown at the time who went on to become famous. Gus Van Sant used some of Rota's music in his 2007 film Paranoid Park and director Michael Winterbottom used several Rota selections in the 2005 film Tristram Shandy: A Cock and Bull Story. Danny Elfman frequently cites Nino Rota as a major influence (particularly on his scores for the Pee-Wee films). Director Mario Monicelli filmed a documentary Un amico magico: il maestro Nino Rota which featured interviews with Franco Zeffirelli and Riccardo Muti (a student under Rota at Bari Conservatory), and was followed by a German documentary Nino Rota - Un maestro della musica. Both explored the film and concert sides of the composer.

== Operas ==
Rota's 1955 opera Il cappello di paglia di Firenze (The Florentine Straw Hat) is an adaptation of the play by Eugène Labiche and was presented by the Santa Fe Opera in 1977. In 2005, his opera Aladino e la lampada magica (Aladdin and the Magical Lamp), with Cosmin Ifrim in the title role, was performed in German translation at the Vienna State Opera and released on DVD. Il cappello di paglia di Firenze and Aladino e la lampada magica are regularly staged in Europe, as are many symphonic and chamber titles

Written for a radio production by RAI in 1950, Rota's short opera, I due timidi (The Two Timid Ones), was presented by the Santa Fe Opera as part of their pre-season "One-Hour Opera" program in May/June 2008, as well as London's Guildhall School of Music and Drama as part of a 'Triple Bill' in 2022.

== Personal life and death ==
Rota had one daughter from a relationship with pianist Magdalena Longari.

Rota died in Rome on 10 April 1979, aged 67, from a coronary thrombosis.
