= Micky =

Micky or Mickie can be a given name, but it is most often a nickname for Michael or non-English equivalents, such as "Mikhail". People with the name include:

== Men ==
- Micky Adams (born 1961), English football manager and former player
- Micky Arison (born 1949), Chief Executive Officer of Carnival Corporation
- Micky Dolenz (born 1945), American actor, musician, and television and theatre director
- Micky Dore (1883–1910), Australian rugby union and rugby league player
- Micky Droy (born 1951), English retired footballer
- Micky Hazard (born 1960), English retired footballer
- Mickie Henson (1963–2022), American professional wrestling referee
- Micky Horswill (born 1953), British professional footballer
- Micky Mellon (born 1972), Scottish football manage and former player
- Micky Moody (born 1950), English guitarist
- Micky Quinn (born 1962), English retired footballer
- Micky Lee Soule (born 1946), American musician, founding member of Ritchie Blackmore's Rainbow
- Micky Stewart (born 1932), English former cricketer, coach and administrator
- Micky van de Ven (born 2001), Dutch Footballer
- Micky Waller (1941–2008), English rock and blues drummer
- Micky Ward (born 1965), American retired professional boxer
- Micky Yoochun, the former stage name of Park Yoo-chun (born 1986), Korean singer who was a member of the boy band TVXQ
- Sweet Micky, stage name of Michel Martelly (born 1961), Haitian musician and former President of Haiti (2011–2016)

== Women ==
- Delia Akeley (1869–1970), American explorer
- Micky Adriaansens (born 1964), Dutch politician, lawyer and administrator
- Micky Allan (born 1944), Australian photographer and artist
- Micky Axton (1919–2020), American aviator
- Micky Colton (born 1958), Canadian military pilot
- Mickie Caspi (born 1961), Israeli-American calligrapher and artist
- Mickie DeMoss (born 1955), American college basketball coach and player
- Mickie de Stoop, Australian former radio and television presenter
- Micky Green (born 1984), Australian blues pop singer-songwriter
- Micky Hoogendijk (born 1970), Dutch actress
- Mickie James (born 1979), American country singer and professional wrestler
- Mickie Knuckles (born 1984), American professional wrestler
- Micky Levy (fl. 2003–present), Israeli-American screenwriter and cinema actress
- Micky Nevill (1925–2023), British aristocrat
- Mickie Siebert (1928–2013), American businesswoman

== See also ==
- Mickey and Mickey (disambiguation)
- Mick (disambiguation)
