= The Mick =

The Mick may refer to:

- The Mick (TV series), an American show broadcast on Fox Network from 2017-2018
- Mickey Mantle, a Major League Baseball player for the New York Yankees, playing from 1951–1968

== See also ==
- Mick (disambiguation)
