= Thousand Pounds Action Company =

American film production company

Thousand Pounds Action Company was an independent company, based out of Los Angeles, California, co-created by Christopher C. Cowan, Vonzell Carter and Darren Bailey in 2010, which produced short action films that include an Asian martial arts sensibility, as well as visual effects. The team consisted of various actors, stunt performers, and fight choreographers, all who have a martial arts background. Chris Cowan served as director, editor, director of photography and lead visual effects artist. It is stated on the company's Facebook page, "We hope to gain investments for our own projects and to be available to help the needs of other filmmakers and artists. We also have committed to continue making exciting adaptive and original films."

As stated in an interview with Extrahype.com, the name Thousand Pounds "comes from a Taijiquan proverb which states that four ounces of force is enough to move a thousand pounds."

With millions of views on multiple videos, and a very high LIKE percentage, the company received global recognition on YouTube, namely for their anime and video game adaptations to a live-action format. Most notably of these are the videos based on Naruto: Shippuden and Capcom's Street Fighter franchise. Their videos have been featured on the main websites of Capcom and Kotaku, among others.

After the release of a 2013 crowdfunded TV pilot, Clandestine, the company disbanded.

Members Christopher C. Cowan, Haile Lee and contributing writer Lex Randleman went on to form a similar group called Epic Rival, whose videos featured a number of Thousand Pounds team members and collaborators. One of Epic Rival's films was a direct sequel to Thousand Pounds' Naruto Shippuden fan film, entitled Naruto Shippuden: Dance of War.

== Members (in order of date joined) ==
- Christopher C. Cowan
- Vonzell Carter
- Darren Bailey
- David 'Dax' Bauer
- James Young
- Brendon Huor
- Amy Johnston
- Mickey Facchinello
- Haile Lee

== Main Videos (in order of their debut) ==
Omitted are the group's trailers, concepts, tests and training videos.

- Street Fighter: Beginnings End
- Tag Match
- Ultra Combos #1
- Ultra Combos #2 (Femme Fatales)
- Ultra Combos #3 (Final Round)
- Naruto Shippuden: Dreamers Fight -- Part One
- Street Fighter X Tekken: The Devil Within - Short Film
- Naruto Shippuden: Dreamers Fight -- Complete Film (Part 1&2)
- Eleven

== Awards ==
- FXhome Awards 2011 - WINNER for Best Visual Effects category for Street Fighter: Beginnings End

== Publicity ==
- On July 2, 2011, Thousand Pounds led an hour-long panel at Anime Expo in Los Angeles, California, where they showcased a rough cut of their live-action Naruto adaptation, entitled Naruto Shippuden: Dreamers Fight -- Part One. The final version of Part One debuted on YouTube on September 26, 2011.
- On Nov.18, 2011, the group announced on their YouTube channel that CAPCOM is producing an original video for the team to coincide with the release of Street Fighter X Tekken.
- On July 1, 2012, Thousand Pounds led an hour and a half long panel at Anime Expo in Los Angeles, California, where they screened Naruto Shippuden: Dreamers Fight -- Complete Film (Part 1&2). Here, they also announced the launch of their original series, Clandestine.
- On July 31, 2012, the team successfully surpassed their $75,000 Kickstarter pledge request, earning a grand total of $95,685 from 982 backers to produce the first two episodes of their original web series, "Clandestine".
- From August 23–26, 2012, the team were guests in the Anime category at Fan Expo Canada, screening previous works and including live, on-stage action.
- On September 15, 2012, the team led a panel at Stan Lee's Comikaze Expo, at which previous films were screened as well as a teaser trailer for a live-action mash-up of various samurai characters in popular anime.
- On April 12, 2013, members from the team were present for a live-streaming fan chat/gaming session on the web series 1337LoungeLive.
- On July 7, 2013, Thousand Pounds led a panel at Anime Expo entitled "Thousand Pounds Live Action Anime Hour", marking the team's third consecutive year leading a panel at Anime Expo. New content from their original web series Clandestine was shared, and well as previous works. Among other guests, Reuben Langdon, who appeared as Ken in their film Street Fighter X Tekken: The Devil Within, sat on the panel, as he is also playing a character in Clandestine.
- On June 7, 2014, Thousand Pounds were special guests, along with Reuben Langdon at Ninja-Con in the district of Little Tokyo, Los Angeles, CA.
- On July 4, 2014, Thousand Pounds led an hour-long panel at Anime Expo at the Los Angeles Convention Center entitled "Live Action Anime & Video Game Hour".
