= Mickey Facchinello =

American martial artist

- Born: 1991 (age 33–34); U.S.
- Occupations: martial artist; actress; stuntwoman; stunt double; stunt choreographer

Michaela "Mickey" Facchinello (born 1991) is an American stuntwoman, martial artist, actress, stunt choreographer, and entertainer.

== Early life ==
She has practiced karate since she was nine, though different sources says seven. Facchinello herself states: "I actually began when I was eight years old in Tae Kwon Do. My mother and my grandmother both wanted me to be in a sport that would keep me physically active and teach me good fundamentals and also let me have fun, so they chose Karate.”

She obtained a black belt in 2006 from Nicklaus’ Martial Arts America in La Crosse, Wisconsin. In 2008, at the age of 16, Facchinello made the decision to move to Naperville, Illinois, to transfer to Waubonsie Valley High School and train full-time under the instruction of John Sharkey Jr. - the American Karate Association president and ninth degree black belt holder in Shōrei-ryū, and a third degree black belt holder in Shōtōkan. Another source says it was two months before the start of her senior year, at the age of 17.

Facchinello is one of the most well known traditional North American Sport Karate Association (NASKA) competitors and has won multiple national and world championships. Circuits Facchinello has competed on include: Capitol Classic (2008 champion of Forms), Quebec Open (in Canada), Compete Nationals, Diamond Nationals, NASKA, A.K.A. Grands (American Karate Association), and I.S.K.A. She has won at least 3 national titles.

A year later, just weeks after graduating from Waubonsie Valley, Facchinello won the junior forms division world championship at the American Karate Association Grand Nationals Tournament (June 2009) in Kentucky.

Facchinello is currently competing as a member of Team AKA, and is now one of the head instructors at Sharkey's Karate. Facchinello enjoys taking dance classes and learning aerial silks or fabrics. She currently resides in Van Nuys, Los Angeles, California.

== Career ==
In 2009, Facchinello was asked to be a part of world-renowned Sideswipe performance team, created by Sharkey disciples Matt Mullins and Mike Chaturantabut. "I wanted more of a challenge," Facchinello said. "Sharkey's offered extreme, which I was interested in and had never done. There was also performance, and I wanted to do that. XMA (Xtreme Martial Arts) is a little faster paced, a different level of martial arts, a different style. There's a lot of tumbling, sometimes music - it's more of an Americanized martial arts. It is really cool to watch. Anyone who watches it is impressed." Combining elements from martial arts, weapons choreography, acrobatics, dance and gymnastics, with an emphasis on showmanship, Sideswipe performs throughout the world, and it played a major role on Facchinello's desire to relocate.

Facchinello performed on a daily basis alongside an otherwise all-male cast in Tropicana Hotel Las Vegas’ from Dec 2010 to 2011 in the headlining martial arts live show Sideswipe LIVE!

Since 2010, Facchinello has been a member of the Chicago Stunt Team LBP and Thousand Pounds Action Company based in Los Angeles, California.

In 2010, she had a second degree black belt. Having already earned the rank of second degree black belt in taekwondo, after several years at Sharkey's Karate, Facchinello is now experienced in several styles of the martial arts as well as other performance skills which include the shōrei-ryū and shōtōkan karate, wushu, numerous weapons (including bō staff, kama, sword), bullwhip, aerial silks, power tumbling and free tumbling, parkour/freerunning and contemporary and hip-hop dance).

Facchinello had her black belt test on August 27, 2011.

In 2012, Facchinello was a cast member of a movie called Slug Street Scrappers: Rise of Ryuken, starring Micah Brock. The same year, action director Vlad Rimburg filmed small demo videos of her fighting.

In 2013, Facchinello was a cast member of martial arts web series Clandestine. She has been a stunt performer in the movies Unlucky Stars, The Purge, and 22 Jump Street, and was the stunt double for Mila Kunis in Jupiter Ascending. She is Emily Beecham's stunt double on the AMC martial arts drama series Into the Badlands, and was a stunt performer in Wonder Woman (2017).

== Filmography ==
Films
| Year | Title | Role | Note |
|---|---|---|---|
| 2018 | Model A | stunt performer | short film |
| 2019 | Alita: Battle Angel | stunt double | as Michaela Facchinello |
| 2020 | Throne | stunt performer | short film |
| 2020 | Bloodshot | Utility stunts | as a minor stunt performer |
| 2020 | Wonder Woman 1984 | stunt performer | minor stunts |
| 2021 | Hitman's Wife's Bodyguard | stunt double | stunt double |
| 2021 | Black Widow | stunt double | Fight team stunts |
| 2021 | The Matrix Resurrections | stunts | as stunt performer |

Television
| Year | Title | Role | Notes |
|---|---|---|---|
| 2018 | Mayans M.C. | stunt performer | 1 episode |
| 2019 | Love, Death & Robots | stunt performer | 1 episode |
| 2019 | Into the Badlands | stunt double for Emily Beecham | 23 episodes |
