= Free Music Store =

New York free music concert series

- Genre: Experimental, classical, folk, jazz
- Location: New York City
- Years active: 1969–1976
- Founder: Eric Salzman
- Sponsor: WBAI (Pacifica Radio)

The Free Music Store was a live concert series hosted by WBAI-FM, a Pacifica Radio station in New York City, from 1969 to 1976. Conceived by composer and WBAI music director Eric Salzman, and later produced by Ira Weitzman, the series aimed to democratize access to live music by offering free performances from a wide range of genres, including experimental, classical, folk, and avant-garde music.

== History ==
The Free Music Store began in 1969, inspired by public arts initiatives such as Shakespeare in the Park. After moving from a Public Theater space, concerts were held in the deconsecrated church on East 62nd Street that was WBAI's home. The venue featured floor seating, refreshments at the entrance, and a relaxed, community-oriented atmosphere. Smoking was prohibited—except for performers.

Audience members were encouraged to make donations, which were divided between the performers and WBAI's operating costs. Concerts were recorded in high-fidelity stereo using four-track equipment by Pacifica engineers including David Rapkin.

== Performers and Programming ==
The Free Music Store hosted a diverse lineup of musicians, including: Aeolian Chamber Players, David Bromberg, Suzanne Ciani, Cleveland Quartet, Julius Eastman with John Adams, The Firesign Theatre, Milford Graves, Jim Hall, John Hammond Jr., Keith Jarrett, Igor Kipnis, Don McLean, Joe McPhee, Meredith Monk, Mother Mallard's Portable Masterpiece Company, Pran Nath, Phil Ochs, Oregon (band), Max Roach, Dave van Ronk, Peter Schickele, Seals and Crofts, Lucy Shelton, Patrick Sky, Patti Smith, János Starker and Naná Vasconcelos. Special events included a tribute to Igor Stravinsky held in December 1971, several months after his death.

The Free Music Store played a notable role in the revival of ragtime music during the early 1970s. Beginning in 1970, WBAI hosted an annual 'Ragtime Revival Reunion' concert as part of the series, featuring performances of works by Scott Joplin and other early ragtime composers. These concerts contributed to resurgence of interest in ragtime by presenting it not as nostalgic novelty but as a vital and complex musical form worthy of serious appreciation, even before its popularization by the 1973 film The Sting. Among the performers were William Bolcom, Eubie Blake and Joshua Rifkin -- whose influential 1970 and 1972 piano recordings of Scott Joplin were Grammy-nominated.

== Legacy ==
Many performances were preserved by the Pacifica Radio Archives, supported by grants from organizations such as the Grammy Foundation.

One notable release is At WBAI's Free Music Store, 1971, a live album by jazz multi-instrumentalist Joe McPhee and Survival Unit II, recorded on October 30, 1971. The album was released in 1996 by the Swedish label HatHut Records.
