= Mickey Waldman =

American radio producer (1942–2008)

- Born: Marian Zucker; August 12, 1942; New York City, New York, USA
- Died: May 8, 2008 (aged 65)
- Education: University of Chicago; Hofstra University
- Occupations: radio personality and producer
- Employer: WBAI

Mickey Waldman (born Marian Zucker; August 12, 1942 – May 20, 2008) was an American radio personality/host and producer at influential WBAI in New York.

== Early life and education ==
Waldman was born on August 12, 1942, in New York City, she gained the nickname "Mickey" while studying at the University of Chicago. She graduated with a Bachelor's degree in 1965. She married in 1968 and kept the surname Waldman after getting divorced. Waldman earned her Juris Doctor from Hofstra University in 1981.

== Career ==
Mickey Waldman started working at WBAI, the Pacifica Foundation's New York station, as an assistant and technician, along with Nancy Allen, for Bob Fass on his late night radio show, Radio Unnameable. She began as a volunteer, but in time became one of the station's relatively few paid employees.

Waldman went on to produce freeform radio shows titled Swan Song and The Next Swan for WBAI-FM in New York City for approximately 4 years. The latter title was derived from the legendary story of the tenor who missed the mechanical swan he was to board and upon which he was to be taken off stage who then, stuck awkwardly on stage, launched into an improvised song including the lyric "What time is the next swan?" as he made his way offstage. She presented discussion and interviews with literati of the moment.

Waldman was expert in the intricacies of the 1973 Carlin Case and provided coverage of the particulars and of the free speech issues the case presented.

== Personal ==
Station Manager and on-air personality Larry Josephson commented on her intelligence and literacy, referring to her as someone who "eats dictionaries." She could often be seen behind the master control console at WBAI with her signature pack of cigarettes and cup of black coffee. She was never far from either. She was never able to break her 3-pack a day habit.

== Death ==
Mickey Waldman died of cancer on May 20, 2008.
