= Mickey Smith (artist) =

American photographer and conceptual artist

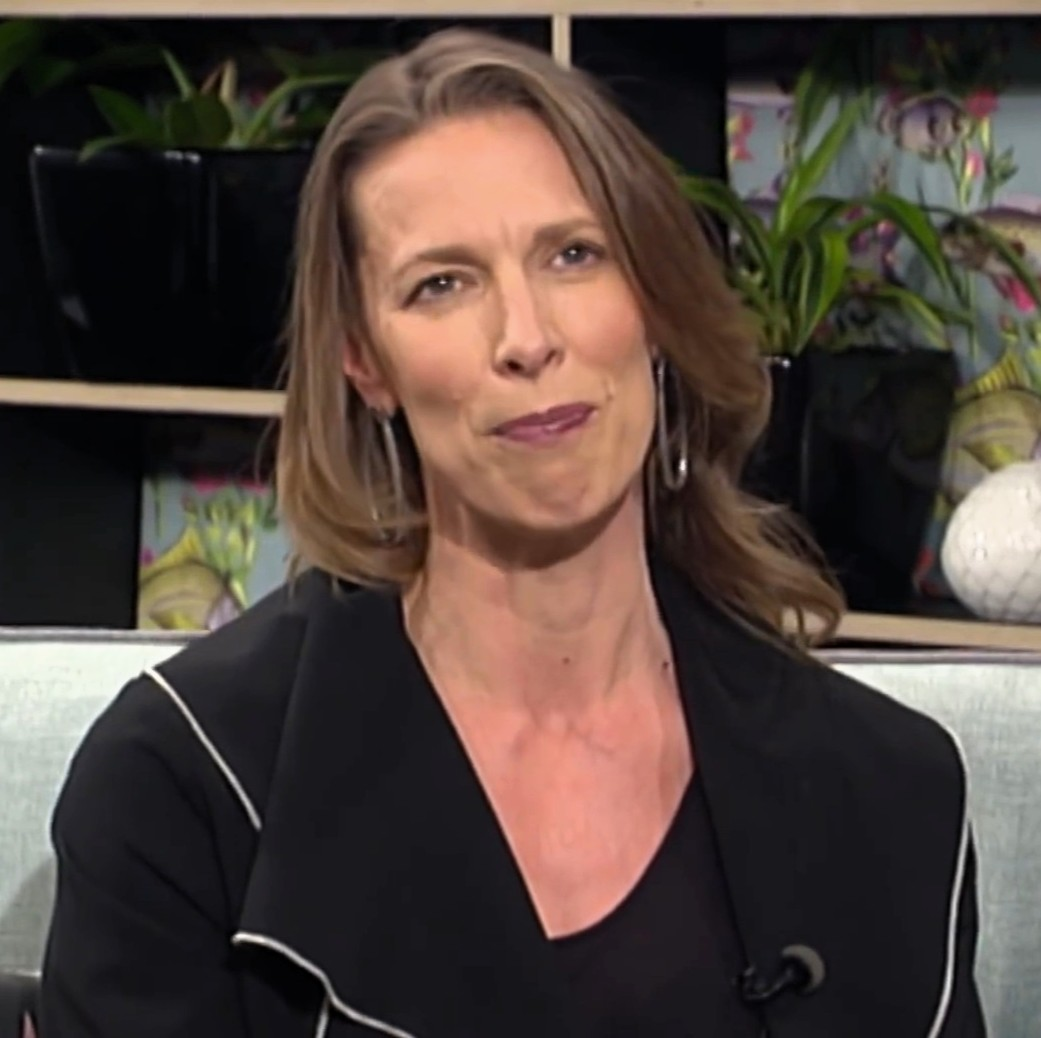
- Smith in 2018
- Born: 1972 (age 53–54); Duluth, Minnesota, U.S.
- Education: Minnesota State University
- Known for: Conceptual art, photography
- Notable work: Believe You Me; Collocations; Denudation; Volume; You People

Mickey Smith (born 1972 in Duluth, Minnesota, U.S.) is an American photographer, conceptual artist, and jewellery designer working in Auckland, New Zealand. Her works have exhibited throughout the United States, in Europe, China, Oceania, and Russia. She has received a McKnight Artist Fellowship for Photography as well as grants from Forecast Public Art, CEC ArtsLink, and the Lower Manhattan Cultural Council.

In 2018, Te Tuhi published her book As You Will... Carnegie Libraries of the South Pacific, a documentary project focused on the 25 Carnegie libraries erected in New Zealand, Australia, and Fiji. Her first artist's book, Denudation, published by Hassla, was included in the photobook installation, A Different Kind of Order: The ICP Triennial in 2012. Mickey recently completed a Diploma in Jewellery Design from Hungry Creek Art & Craft School, expanding her artistic practice.

Smith's work is available through Sanderson Contemporary, Auckland and ClampArt, New York.

== Series ==
=== Volume ===
In her series, Volume (2006-2010), Smith photographed library-stack sets of bound periodicals to memorialize them as shared objects of a common literary culture, now passed. Volume documented bound periodicals and journals in public libraries. The books and words are not touched, artificially lit, or manipulated – rather created by the librarian, found in the stacks, and positioned by the last anonymous reader. The focus was on simple, provocative titles that transcend the spines on which they appear to create conceptual, language-based, anthropological works. Smith's large scale installations, Collocations, were an evolution of the Volume series.

=== Believe You Me ===
In Believe You Me (2010), she examined the manner in which books and book-learning continue to deliver status even in a culture that has turned away from reading—indeed even more powerfully, and more pervasively, than in eras that had not yet given up on the book as a storehouse of knowledge. In these contemporary images, books have become vacant props, drafted into private battles and culture wars out of a desperate nostalgia for the fading power of the written word.

=== Denudation ===
In her series, Denudation (2012), Mickey Smith presents a kind of in-situ laboratory-style photography—the image as evidentiary document, the print as cold case. The stark, dark photographs in this new exhibition test the limits of objectivity and the false consolation of casualness even as, in the tradition of documentary and crime-scene photography, the images aspire to conscientious neutrality. The photographs document those objects discarded within an abandoned library, but their formal objectivity is no guard against the ghosts of narrative, perceived or imagined.

== Awards ==
- Creative New Zealand Grantee, 2016
- Public Art Year in Review Project Winner, 2010
- LMCC Manhattan Community Arts Fund Grantee, 2009
- Permanent Commission Recipient, University of Florida, 2009
- CEC Artslink Grantee, 2008
- Baum Award for Emerging American Photographers [Nominee], 2008
- Fulbright Research Fellowship [Finalist + Alternate], 2008
- FORECAST Public Artworks Public Art Affairs Grantee, 2007
- Magenta Foundation's Flash Forward [Honorable Mention], 2007
- McKnight Foundation Artist Fellowship for Photography, 2006

== Collections ==
- Center for Photography at Woodstock, Woodstock, NY
- Dorsey & Whitney, Minneapolis, MN
- Fidelity Corporate Art Collection, Boston, MA
- Fredrickson & Byron, Minneapolis, MN
- Johns Hopkins Children's Center, Baltimore, MD
- Miami Dade Public Library, Miami, FL
- Minnesota Historical Society, Saint Paul, MN
- Museum of Modern Art Library, New York, NY
- Northland Collection, Saint Paul, MN
- North Dakota Museum of Art, Grand Forks, ND
- Sheldon Museum of Art, Lincoln, NE
- University of Florida, Gainesville, FL
- Weisman Art Museum, Minneapolis, MN

== Bibliography ==
- As You Will... Carnegie Libraries in the South Pacific. Review by Mary Macpherson, January 2019
- Photographer pays tribute to Andrew Carnegie. RadioLIVE interview by Wendyl Nissen, September 2018
- Mickey Smith and the Carnegie Libraries. Interview by Lynn Freeman, Radio New Zealand, September 2018
- As You Will... Carnegie Libraries in the South Pacific. Te Tuhi, 2018
- Harboureed by the Harbour: An inn for tired travellers
- Meadows, Jodi. Enjoy Public Art Gallery. February 2015
- Flash Forward Tenth, Magenta Foundation 2014
- Architecture Glass Art, Franz Mayer of Munich 2013
- 50 Gifts 50 Years, Sheldon Museum of Art 2013
- Denudation. Hassla Books. September 2012
- GQ. The Book that Changed My... June 2011
- Abe's Penny. Collaboration with Lamb, John. January 2011
- The Last Magazine. October 2010
- THEME Magazine [Issue #23]. Dalton, Trinie. Schiller, Sara + Marc [Curators]. July 2010
- New York Times. Reader's Delight. New York Times. Smith, Roberta. July 2010
- Abe's Penny NADA Special Edition. Brehm, Hannah. December 2009
- ESOPUS [Issue #13]. Artist Project. October 2009
- PRC Annual Juried Publication. September 2009
- Habertarts.com Text Messaging. Habler, John. April 2009
- Dallas Morning News. There's something I’ve been meaning to tell you... Granberry, Michael. March 2009
- Time Out St. Petersburg. Volume: Mickey Smith Project. Turkina, Olesia. December 2008
- Modern Art Obsession. Mickey Smith Photography at the New Invisible-Exports Gallery. Hoeh, Mike. November 2008
- New York Magazine. Photographer Mickey Smith Goes to the Library. Pearse, Emma. November 2008
- PDNedu [Vol. 7 Issue #1]. One To Watch. Gordon, Jessica. March 2008
- American Photography 23. Selected Photographer. November 2007
- MyArtSpace.com. Interview. Sherwin, Brian. October 2007
- Magenta Foundation for the Arts. Flash Forward 2007. October 2007
- mnartists.org. The Medium Itself. Riddle, Mason. September 2007
- Flak Photo. Weekend Series. September 2007
- Review Magazine. Project-in-Print. August 2007
- Flak Photo. Featured Artist. February 2007
- Photography Quarterly [Issue #95]. Cover Image. September 2006
- mnartists.org. Money, Money, Money. O’Sullivan, Thomas. August 2005
