= Winthrop Smith =

Winthrop Smith or Win Smith may refer to

- Winthrop H. Smith (1893–1961), American investment banker and businessman
- Winthrop H. Smith Jr. (born 1949), American financial executive
- Winthrop Smith (politician), Connecticut politician
- Winthrop W. Smith, American physicist
- Win Smith, an early inker of the Mickey Mouse (comic strip)
