= Mickey srl =

Paraguayan retail company

Mickey SRL
- Website: mickey.com.py

Mickey SRL is a Paraguayan food company primarily known for spices. The company was registered in 1935 with the Ministry of Industry and Commerce of Paraguay by Pascual Blasco Ciano in Asunción. Pascual Blasco set up a small shop near downtown Asunción that was dedicated to selling fruits and handmade ice cream. Later in 1939, the company was expanded as an ice cream parlor, café, and confectionery under the Mickey brand. On November 19, 1969, Mickey SRL Industria de Productos Alimenticios was established.

== Alleged Trademark Infringement ==
In 1991, The Walt Disney Company filed a trademark infringement complaint with Paraguay's Ministry of Business and Industry, which was subsequently rejected. Disney then pursued legal action, initiating a lawsuit against the Paraguayan entity using the "Mickey" trademark. However, in 1995, a trademark tribunal ruled in favor of Mickey SRL.

Disney escalated the case to Paraguay's highest court, arguing that the similarity between its character and the Paraguayan trademark could lead to consumer confusion. While one judge acknowledged that Paraguayans might mistake the two, the case hinged on a legal technicality. The Paraguayan Mickey trademark had been registered since at least 1956, with its ownership continuously renewed by Pascual's descendants. Notably, Disney had not previously contested the registration.

In 1998, Paraguay's Supreme Court issued a final ruling, affirming that due to decades of uninterrupted use, the Paraguayan trademark holder had legally acquired the right to continue using the "Mickey" name.
