= Mick Clarke (footballer) =

Irish footballer

Personal information
- Date of birth: 19 June 1989 (age 37)
- Place of birth: Drogheda, Ireland
- Position: Defender

Youth career
- Kentstown

Senior career*
Years	Team	Apps	(Gls)
2007–2009	Drogheda United	3	(0)
2010	Shelbourne	9	(0)
- * Club domestic league appearances and goals as of 2 August 2010

Mick Clarke (born 19 June 1989) is an Irish footballer who is unattached. Clarke is a defender and plays as a right-back.

== Career ==
Mick Clarke is a tough defender. He used to play for Irish team Kentstown before moving on to Drogheda United's U17 Team. Clarke made his Drogheda United senior debut in May 2007 in a 3-0 League of Ireland Cup defeat to Shamrock Rovers. In May 2008, he signed a professional contract with Drogheda United. Clarke made a number of first team starts towards the end of the 2008 season. In 2009, Clarke started Drogheda's first league game of 2009 season against Derry City but following this he struggled to hold down a place in their first team. Clarke departed Drogheda United at the end of the 2009 season and he joined Shelbourne on 21 February 2010. He made his Shelbourne debut in a League of Ireland Cup tie against Monaghan United on 23 March 2010. Clarke briefly held down Shels' right back spot during the midpoint of their 2010 season before parting ways with the club on 17 August 2010. During his spell at Shelbourne he made a total 11 league and cup appearances for Shelbourne and he won a Leinster Senior Cup winners medal as an unused substitute in the final against Bray Wanderers on 2 August 2010.

== Career statistics ==
Correct as of July 30, 2010.

Club	Season	League	League		FAI Cup		League Cup		Setanta Cup		Leinster SC		Total	
Club	Season	League	Apps	Goals	Apps	Goals	Apps	Goals	Apps	Goals	Apps	Goals	Apps	Goals
Drogheda United	2007	Premier Division	0	0	0	0	1	0	0	0	-	-	1	0
Drogheda United	2008	Premier Division	2	0	1	0	1	0	1	0	-	-	5	0
Drogheda United	2009	Premier Division	1	0	0	0	1	0	-	-	-	-	2	0
Drogheda United	Total		3	0	1	0	3	0	1	0	-	-	8	0
Shelbourne	2010	First Division	9	0	0	0	1	0	-	-	1	0	11	0
Shelbourne	Total		9	0	0	0	1	0	-	-	1	0	11	0
Career total			12	0	1	0	4	0	1	0	1	0	19	0

== Honours ==
- Leinster Senior Cup: 1
  - Shelbourne - 2010
