= Michel (name) =

- Pronunciation: French: [miʃɛl] Dutch: [ˈmiʃɛl̻]
- Gender: Male and female

Origin
- Origin: Hebrew: מִיכָאֵל / מיכאל [miχaˈʔel]
- Meaning: Who Is Like God?
- Region of origin: France, South Africa, Netherlands, Germany, Quebec, Canada

Other names
- Related names: Michael, Michelle, Mitchell

Michel is a name used today in France, Canada, Belgium and other French-speaking countries. It can be both a given name and a surname of Hebrew origin, derived from Hebrew: מִיכָאֵל / מיכאל [miχaˈʔel], meaning Who Is Like God? The name is particularly common in French (from where the standard English pronunciation is derived), German (already in Middle High German), Dutch, and Afrikaans. In these instances Michel is equivalent to the English personal name Michael, although in Dutch the name Michaël is also common. Mitxel is the Basque form of Michael. When of Czech, Slovak or Polish origin it is a variant of the personal name Michal. When of Greek origin, the surname Michel is a shortened form of various patronymic derivatives of Michael. Examples of such are Michelakis, Michelakakis, or Michelakos.

== Persons with the surname ==
- Alain Michel (disambiguation), several people
- Ambroise Michel (born 1982), French actor, director and writer
- André Michel (disambiguation), several people
- Anette Michel (born 1971), Mexican actress
- Anneliese Michel (1952–1976), a German woman said to be possessed by demons
- Annett Wagner-Michel (born 1955), German chess master
- Augustin Michel (1855–1931), a Belgian World War I general
- Chantal Michel (born 1968), Swiss artist
- Charles Michel (disambiguation), several people
- Christopher Michel (born 1967), American investor, entrepreneur and photographer
- Claude Michel (known as Clodion; 1738–1814), French sculptor
- Claude Michel (footballer) (born 1971), French football player
- Claude Michel (politician) (born 1938), French politician
- Curt Michel (1934–2015), American academic and astrophysicist
- Danny Michel (born 1970), Canadian songwriter & producer
- David Michel (1735–1805), United Kingdom deputy
- Hartmut Michel (born 1948), German biochemist
- Henri Michel (historian) (1907–1986), French historian
- Hermann Michel (1912–1984), German Nazi SS officer
- Jacques Michel (1941–2026), Canadian singer-songwriter
- James Michel (born 1944), Seychellois politician
- Jaydy Michel (born 1975), Mexican actress and fashion model
- Jean Michel (disambiguation), several people
- Jean-Louis Michel (disambiguation), several people
- Jessica Michel (born 1982), French dressage rider
- Joffrey Michel (born 1987), French rugby union player
- John B. Michel (1917–1964), science fiction author
- Joseph Michel (disambiguation), several people
- Jules Michel (born 1931), French artist
- Kathrin Michel (born 1963), German politician
- Lilia Michel (1926–2011), Mexican television and film actress
- Luc Michel (1958–2025), Belgian political activist
- Luis Ernesto Michel (born 1979), Mexican professional footballer
- Majid Michel (born 1980), Ghanaian actor
- Mario Michel (born 1960), Saint Lucian lawyer, politician and judge
- Marken Michel (born 1993), American football wide receiver
- Martín Michel (disambiguation), several people
- Michel Georges-Michel (1883–1985), French painter, journalist, novelist, and translator
- Mike Michel (born 1954), NFL football player
- Milton Scott Michel (1916–1992), American crime fiction writer and playwright
- Nettie Leila Michel (1863–1912), American business woman, author, magazine editor
- Paul Michel (disambiguation), several people
- Philippe Michel (disambiguation), several people
- Pierre Michel (born 1942), a French literary scholar
- Pierre Michel (cyclist) (1929–2023), French cyclist
- Pras Michel (born 1972), an American musician
- Robert H. Michel (1928–2017), a United States politician
- Rolf Michel (born 1945), a German physicist
- Sandro Michel (born 1996), Swiss bobsledder
- Serge Michel (born 1988), German boxer
- Sia Michel (born 1967), deputy culture editor of The New York Times
- Sony Michel (born 1995), NFL football player
- Stenia Michel (born 1987), Swiss footballer
- Sylvia Michel (disambiguation), several people
- Thiago Michel (born 1984), Brazilian professional kickboxer and mixed martial arts (MMA) fighter
- Thomas Michel (born 1955), Professor in Medicine at Harvard Medical School
- Thomas Michel (basketball) (born 1995), German basketball player
- Wilhelm Michel (1877–1942), German writer, Georg Büchner Prize in 1925
- Yvon Michel (born 1953), French Canadian boxing promoter

== Persons with the given name ==
- Michel Aflaq (1910–1989), Syrian founder of the Ba'ath ideology
- Michel Américo dos Santos (born 2002), Brazilian footballer
- Michel Aoun (born 1933), Lebanese Army Commander and president of Lebanon
- Michel Bakhoum (1913–1981), Egyptian civil engineer, professor
- Michel Barrera (born 1980), American fugitive
- Michel Bécot (born 1939), French politician
- Michel Bernanos (1923–1964), French poet and fantasy writer
- Michel Billout (born 1958), French politician
- Michel Brunet (disambiguation), several persons
- Michel Cadotte (1764–1837), Canadian Métis fur trader
- Michel Camilo (born 1954), Dominican Republic pianist and composer
- Michel de Certeau (1925–1986), French Jesuit and scholar
- Michel das Chagas Henrique (born 1989), Brazilian footballer
- Michel Chiha (1891–1954), Lebanese banker, politician, writer and journalist
- Michel Corneille the Younger (1642–1708), French painter, etcher and engraver
- Michel Corrette (1707–1795) French organist, composer and author of musical method books
- Michel Danino (born 1950), French-born Indian Hindutva author
- Michel Deckmann (born 1996), German politician
- Michel Devoret (born 1953), French-American physicist
- Michel Djotodia, Central African politician who was President of the Central African Republic from 2013 to 2014
- Michel dos Reis Santana (born 1977), Brazilian footballer
- Michel Doukeris (born 1973), Brazilian businessman, CEO of AB InBev
- Michel Drucker (born 1942), French journalist and TV host
- Michel Ferrari (born 1954), Swiss neurologist
- Michel Field (born 1954), French journalist
- Michel Foucault (1926–1984), French philosopher, historian and sociologist
- Michel Friedman (born 1956), German politician and TV host
- Michel Galabru (1922–2016), French actor
- Michel Garbini Pereira (born 1981), Brazilian footballer
- Michel Gast (1930–2022), French film director and produce
- Michel Godard (musician) (born 1960), French tuba player and jazz musician
- Michel Godbout, Canadian news anchor
- Michel Goma (1932–2022), French fashion designer
- Michel Gondry (born 1963), French screenwriter, and director
- Michel Guerry (born 1932), French politician
- Michel Hamaide (1936–2017), French politician
- Michel Henry (1922–2002), French philosopher and novelist
- Michel Houellebecq (born 1958), French writer
- Michel Kaplan (born 1946), French Byzantinist
- Michel Klein (designer) (born 1958), French fashion designer
- Michel El Khoury (1926–2026), Lebanese politician
- Michel Lajoie (fl. 2014), American politician
- Michel Legrand (1932–2019), French musical composer, arranger, conductor, and pianist
- Michel Losch, musician and video game developer, known professionally as Millbrook
- Michel Macquet (1932–2002), French javelin thrower
- Michel Moffatt, American politician
- Michel Moore, LAPD chief
- Michel Murr (1932–2021), Lebanese politician
- Michel Ney (1769–1815), French soldier and military commander during the French Revolutionary Wars and Napoleonic Wars, Marshal of the Empire
- Michel de Nostredame (1503–1566), French astrologer, physician and reputed seer
- Michel van Oostrum (born 1966), Dutch footballer
- Michel von Tell (born 1980), Swiss artist
- Michel Otañez (born 1997), Dominican baseball player
- Michel Pastor (1944–2014), Monagasque businessman and art collector
- Michel Pereira (disambiguation), several people
- Michel Petrucciani (1962–1999), French jazz pianist
- Michel Pezet (born 1942), French politician
- Michel Polnareff (born 1944), French singer
- Michel Portal (1935–2026), French composer, saxophonist and clarinetist
- Michel Platini (born 1955), French football manager and player, president of UEFA
- Michel Rabagliati, Canadian cartoonist
- Michel Randrianekena, Malagasy politician
- Michel Joachim Marie Raymond (1755–1798), French general
- Michel Rocard (1930–2016), French politician
- Michel Rojkind (born 1969), Mexican architect
- Michel Samaha (born 1948), Lebanese politician
- Michel Georges Sassine (1927–2014), Lebanese politician
- Michel Sebastiani, French fencing master
- Michel Sikyea (1901–2002), Canadian aboriginal rights activist
- Michel Soymié (1924–2002), French sinologist
- Michel Sulaiman (born 1948), commander of the Lebanese Armed Forces
- Michel Tabachnik (born 1942), Swiss musician
- Michel Tapié (1909–1987), French critic, curator, and art collector
- Michel Teló (born 1981), Brazilian singer
- Michel Temer (born 1940), Brazilian politician and former President
- Michel Therrien (born 1963), Canadian hockey coach
- Michel Thomas, language teacher
- Michel Tremblay (disambiguation), several persons
- Michel Tromont (1937–2018), Belgian politician
- Michel Trudeau, young son of Pierre Trudeau
- Michel Vaxès (1940–2016), French politician.
- Michel Verne (1861–1925), French writer; son of Jules Verne
- Michel Vialay (born 1960), French politician

=== Middle name ===
- Jean-Michel Basquiat (1960–1988), American artist
- Yechiel Michel Epstein (1829–1908), Lithuanian Rabbi, author of Aruch Hashulchan
- Yechiel Michel Feinstein (1906–2003), Rabbi, Haredi rosh yeshiva in Israel
- Jean-Michel Jarre (born 1948), French composer, performer and music producer
- Jean-Michel Pilc (born 1960), French-born jazz pianist

== Fictional characters ==
- Deutscher Michel, personification of the German nation, usually depicted wearing a nightcap and nightgown
- Michel Bollinger, a character from the visual novel The House in Fata Morgana
- Michel Gerard, a concierge from the TV series Gilmore Girls
- Michel Vaillant, a French comic book character
- Michel Volban de Cabelle, a character from the 2006 anime Glass Fleet
- Michel Desjardins from The Kane Chronicles series by Rick Riordan
- Michel Starzynski from a novel Sarah's Key by Tatiana de Rosnay
- Eikichi “Michel” Mishina from the video game, Persona 2: Innocent Sin
- Michel, a titular character from the 2003 South Korean animated series Guardian Fairy Michel

== See also ==
- Saint-Michel (disambiguation)
