= Michele =

- Pronunciation: English: /mɪˈʃɛl, miːˈʃɛl, ˈmiːʃɛl/ mish-EL, mee-SHEL, MEE-shel; Italian: [miˈkɛːle]
- Gender: Male (Italian); Female (English, French)
- Language: Italian, English, French

Origin
- Languages: Italian, French, Hebrew
- Origin: Hebrew via French
- Meaning: Who is like God?
- Region of origin: Italy

Other names
- Variant form: Michèle
- Related names: Michael, Michel, Michelle, Michelangelo, Mickey, Shelley

Michele (pronounced [miˈkɛːle]) is an Italian male given name, akin to the English male name Michael.

Michele (usually pronounced /mɪˈʃɛl/ mish-EL), is also an English female given name that is derived from the French Michèle. It is a variant spelling of the more common (and identically pronounced) name Michelle. Michele can also be a surname.

The names are ultimately derived from the Hebrew מִיכָאֵל, through the Greek Μιχαήλ and the Latin Michael meaning "Who is like God?".

== Men with the given name Michele ==
- Michele (singer) (born 1944), Italian pop singer
- Michele Abruzzo (1904–1996), Italian actor
- Michele Alboreto (1956–2001), Italian Grand Prix racing driver
- Michele Amari (1806–1889), Italian politician and historian
- Michele Andreolo (1912–1981), Italian footballer
- Michele Bianchi (1883–1930), Italian journalist and revolutionary
- Michele Bravi (born 1994), Italian singer
- Michele Cachia (1760–1839), Maltese architect and military engineer
- Michele Canini (born 1985), Italian footballer
- Michele Paco Castagna (born 1994), Italian speedway rider
- Michele Dancelli (1942–2025), Italian road racing cyclist
- Michele Dell'Orco (born 1985), Italian politician
- Michele Emiliano (born 1959), Italian politician and judge
- Michele Ferrero (1925–2015), Italian businessman, owner of chocolate maker Ferrero SpA
- Michele Gallo (born 2001), Italian fencer
- Michele Greco (1924–2008), Sicilian mafioso
- Mikelangelo (Michele) Loconte (born 1973), Italian musician and author
- Michele Miranda, American mobster
- Michele Monti (1970–2018), Italian judoka
- Michele Morrone (born 1990), Italian actor
- Michele Paolucci (born 1986), Italian footballer
- Michele Pasinato (1969–2021), Italian volleyball player
- Michele De Pietro (1884–1967), Italian lawyer and politician
- Michele Placido (born 1946), Italian actor
- Michele Rüfenacht (born 1959), Swiss decathlete
- Michele Santoro (born 1951), Italian anchorman/journalist
- Michele Scarponi (1979–2017), Italian professional bicyclist
- Michele Sensi-Contugi (1982–2026) Ecuadorian businessman and politician
- Michele Sepe (born 1986), Italian rugby union player
- Michele Serra (born 1954), Italian writer and journalist
- Michele Sindona (1920–1986), Italian banker
- Michele Soavi (born 1957), Italian film director

== Women with the given name Michele ==
- Michele Aaron, British academic in film studies
- Michèle Alliot-Marie (born 1946), French politician
- Michele Amas (1961–2016), New Zealand actress, playwright and poet
- Michèle Artigue (born 1946), French mathematics educator
- Michèle Audin (born 1954), French mathematician
- Michele Bachmann (born 1956), United States Representative from Minnesota
- Michele Baldwin (1966–2012) also known as Lady Ganga, stand up paddled 700 miles down the Ganges River to raise awareness of cervical cancer
- Michèle Barzach (1943–2026), French politician, psychoanalyst and gynaecologist
- Michele Beevors, Australian sculptor
- Michele Bullock (born 1962/1963), Australian economist
- Michele Di Menna (born 1980), Canadian artist
- Michele Dotrice (born 1948), English actress of Some Mothers Do 'Ave 'Em fame
- Michele Elliott, British author, psychologist, teacher and the founder child protection charity Kidscape
- Michele K. Evans, American internist and medical oncologist
- Michele Fitzgerald Winner of Survivor: Kaoh Rong and contestant on The Challenge
- Michele Gumabao (born 1992), Filipina volleyball player and beauty queen
- Michèle Lalonde (1937–2021), Canadian dramatist, essayist, playwright and poet
- Michele Lee (born 1942), American actress
- Michele MacNaughton (born 1973), South African field hockey player
- Michèle Magny (born 1944), Canadian actress, playwright, and director
- Michele Merkin (born 1975), American model and television host
- Michele Meyer, American politician
- Chrisette Michele Payne, known as Chrisette Michele, American neo-soul singer
- Lea Michele Sarfati, known as Lea Michele (born 1986), American actress
- Michele Mitchell (born 1962), American diver
- Michèle Mouton (born 1951), French rally driver
- Michele Peckham, American politician
- Michèle Plomer (born 1965), Canadian writer and translator
- Michele Reneau, American politician
- Michele Singer Reiner (1947–2025), American filmmaker and photographer
- Michèle Renouf (born 1946), Australian socialite and Holocaust denier
- Michele Romanow (born 1985), Canadian entrepreneur
- Michèle Rosier (1930–2017), French director, screenwriter, and fashion designer
- Michèle Sarde (born 1939), French writer
- Michele Scarabelli (born 1955), Canadian actress
- Michèle Sebag, French computer scientist
- Michèle Stephenson, Haitian filmmaker and human rights attorney
- Michele Tafoya, American sports journalist
- Michele Timms (born 1965), Australian basketball player
- Michele Van Gorp (born 1977), American basketball player
- Michele Waagaard (born 1980), Thai model, singer and radio host
- Michele Zappavigna (born 1978), Australian linguist

== Surname ==
- Alessandro Michele, Italian fashion designer
- Draya Michele, American media personality
- Lea Michele, American actress, singer and songwriter
- Michael Michele, American actress
- Riki Michele, American singer
- Alicia Michele, Dogaressa of Venice 1117–1130

== See also ==
- "Michèle" (song), a 1976 song by Gérard Lenorman
- Michel’le, (born 1970) American singer
- Michelle (name)
- Michelle (disambiguation)
