= Blanche River (rivière des Mères) =

River in Chaudière-Appalaches, Quebec (Canada)

- Location within Quebec

Location
- Country: Canada
- Province: Quebec
- Region: Chaudière-Appalaches
- MRC: Bellechasse Regional County Municipality

Physical characteristics
- Source: Agricultural streams
  - location: La Durantaye
  - coordinates: 46.827687°N 70.851076°W
  - elevation: 79 metres (259 ft)
- Mouth: Rivière des Mères
  - location: Saint-Vallier
  - coordinates: 46.88111°N 70.80861°W
  - elevation: 21 metres (69 ft)
- Length: 9.5 kilometres (5.9 mi)

Basin features
- Progression: Rivière des Mères, St. Lawrence River
- Tributaries
  - right: (upstream) Décharge du lac aux Canards, ruisseau Corriveau

The Blanche River (French: rivière Blanche, pronounced [ʁivjɛʁ blɑ̃ʃ], lit. 'White River') is a tributary of the southeast shore of the Mères River which flows northeast to the south shore of the St. Lawrence River. This watercourse flows in the municipalities of La Durantaye and Saint-Vallier, in the regional county municipality (MRC) of Bellechasse, in the administrative region of Chaudière-Appalaches, in the province of Quebec, in Canada.

== Geography ==
The Blanche river has its source on the south side of the village of La Durantaye, on the east side of rue Norbert-Morin. This spring is located 0.9 kilometres (0.56 mi) south of the village of La Durantaye and 2.1 kilometres (1.3 mi) west of "Lac aux Canards". The Blanche river flows north-east especially in agricultural areas, more or less parallel (on the south-east side) to the rivière des Mères.

From its source, the Blanche river "flows over 9.5 kilometres (5.9 mi), divided into the following segments:

- 2.4 kilometres (1.5 mi) north-east, passing the south side of the village of La Durantaye, to the lake road;
- 1.4 kilometres (0.87 mi) towards the northeast, crossing the Canadian National railway and the fourth rang East road, to the Azure road;
- 1.0 kilometre (0.62 mi) northeasterly, up to the limit of La Durantaye and Saint-Vallier;
- 2.6 kilometres (1.6 mi) towards the northeast, collecting the waters of the Corriveau brook (coming from the south), to the highway 20 bridge;
- 2.1 kilometres (1.3 mi) towards the northeast, collecting the waters of the Lac aux Canards Discharge (coming from the south), until its confluence.

The Blanche river empties on the south-eastern bank of the Mères river, very close to the "Montée de la Station" road bridge. This confluence is located on the north side of Highway 20 (near exit 356), south of the village of Saint-Vallier.

== Toponymy ==
The toponym Rivière Blanche was formalized on December 5, 1968, at the Commission de toponymie du Québec.

== See also ==
- List of rivers of Quebec
