= Rivière des Mères =

River in Chaudière-Appalaches, Quebec (Canada)

Location
- Country: Canada
- Province: Quebec
- Region: Chaudière-Appalaches
- MRC: Bellechasse Regional County Municipality

Physical characteristics
- Source: Agricultural creek
  - location: Saint-Michel-de-Bellechasse
  - coordinates: 46°49′36″N 70°52′40″W
  - elevation: 59 m (194 ft)
- Mouth: Chenal des Grands Voiliers (Saint Lawrence River)
  - location: Saint-Vallier
  - coordinates: 46°54′21″N 70°47′15″W
  - elevation: 4 m (13 ft)
- Length: 12.4 km (7.7 mi)

The Rivière des Mères (French pronunciation: [ʁivjɛʁ de mɛʁ]) is a tributary of the south shore of the Saint Lawrence River. This watercourse flows in the municipalities of Saint-Michel-de-Bellechasse and Saint-Vallier, in the Bellechasse Regional County Municipality, in the administrative region of Chaudière-Appalaches, in Quebec, in Canada.

The surface of the rivière des Mères is generally frozen from the beginning of December until the end of March, except for the rapids areas; however, safe circulation on the ice is generally done from mid-December to mid-March. The water level of the river varies with the seasons and the precipitation; the spring flood occurs in March or April.

== Geography ==
The Rivière des Mères rises on the northwest side of the railway, in the 3rd rang west, in Saint-Michel-de-Bellechasse. This source is located 2.5 kilometres (1.6 mi) west of the village of La Durantaye and 6.8 kilometres (4.2 mi) south of the center of the village of Saint-Michel-de-Bellechasse. This river flows northeast, more or less in parallel (on the southeast side) to the Boyer River and the Blanche River.

From its source, the Mères river flows over 12.4 kilometres (7.7 mi), with a drop of 55 metres (180 ft), divided into the following segments:

- 2.6 kilometres (1.6 mi) north-east, passing from the north-west side of the village of La Durantaye, to route 281;
- 3.4 kilometres (2.1 mi) north-east, up to the limit of Saint-Michel-de-Bellechasse and Saint-Vallier;
- 1.8 kilometres (1.1 mi) north-east, up to the bridge of highway 20;
- 2.3 kilometres (1.4 mi) towards the north-east, collecting the waters of the Blanche river "(coming from the south), up to the path" Montée de la Station ";
- 4.1 kilometres (2.5 mi) north-east, to route 132;
- 1.6 kilometres (0.99 mi) north-east, to its confluence.

The Mères river flows onto the long shore in the eastern part of Berthier cove, on the south bank of the St. Lawrence River. This confluence is located on the west side of the village of Berthier-sur-Mer, on the east side of the village of Saint-Vallier and opposite the village of Saint-Jean-de-l'Île-d'Orléans located on Île d'Orléans. This confluence is located east of the confluence of the Boyer River.

== Toponymy ==
The name of this watercourse evokes the work of the Augustine sisters of the General Hospital of Quebec, who owned the seigneury of Saint-Vallier.

The toponym Rivière des Mères was formalized on December 5, 1968, at the Commission de toponymie du Québec.

== See also ==
- List of rivers of Quebec
