= Sarde (surname) =

Sarde is a surname. Notable people with the surname include:

- Alain Sarde (born 1952), French film producer and actor
- Cliff Sarde, American composer, multi-instrumentalist and recording artist
- Michèle Sarde (born 1939), French writer
- Philippe Sarde (born 1948), French film composer
