= Michelle =

Michelle may refer to:

== People ==
- Michelle (name), a given name and surname, the feminine form of Michael
- Michelle Courtens, Dutch singer, performing as "Michelle"
- Michelle (German singer)
- Michelle (Scottish singer) (born 1980), Scottish winner of Pop Idol in 2003
- Michel'le, American singer
- Michelle (band), American band

== Arts, entertainment, and media ==
=== Music ===
- Michelle (album), a 1966 album by saxophonist Bud Shank
- "Michelle" (song), a 1965 song by The Beatles
- "Michelle" (Noam Bettan song), the song representing Israel in the 2026 Eurovision Song Contest
- "Michèle" (song) by French singer Gérard Lenorman
- "Michelle", a 2013 song by Beatallica from Abbey Load
- "Michelle", a song from the Lynyrd Skynyrd compilation album Collectybles
- "My Michelle", a 1987 song by Guns N' Roses
- "A World Without You (Michelle)", a 1988 song by Bad Boys Blue

=== Film ===
- Michelle (Marvel Cinematic Universe), a fictional character of the Marvel Cinematic Universe

=== Television ===
- "Michelle" (Skins series 1), a 2007 episode of the British teen drama Skins

== Science ==
- 1376 Michelle, an asteroid
- Hurricane Michelle, powerful 2001 Atlantic tropical storm

== See also ==
- Michael (disambiguation)
- Michel (disambiguation)
- Michele, a given name and surname
- Nichelle
