= Saint-Michel =

Saint-Michel is the name or part of the name of many places. Michel is French for Michael, and in most cases, these placenames refer to Michael (archangel).

== Places ==
=== In Canada ===
- Saint-Michel, Montreal, a neighbourhood in the Montreal borough of Villeray–Saint-Michel–Parc-Extension and a former city from 1912 to 1968
- Saint-Michel, Quebec, a parish municipality south-east of Montreal
- Saint-Michel-de-Bellechasse, a municipality in the Chaudière-Appalaches region of Quebec
- Saint-Michel-des-Saints, Quebec, a municipality in the Lanaudière region
- Saint-Michel-du-Squatec, Quebec, a parish municipality in the Bas-Saint-Laurent region
- Saint-Michel-d'Yamaska, a town and former municipality now part of Yamaska, Quebec
- Saint-Michel-de-Rougemont, a community in Rougemont, Quebec
- Saint-Michel or Saint-Michel-de-Wentworth, a community in the Laurentian Hills of Wentworth-Nord, Quebec
- Saint-Michel (electoral district), a defunct federal electoral district
- Mont-Saint-Michel, Quebec, a municipality in the Laurentides region

=== In France ===
- Mont-Saint-Michel, in the Manche département
- Saint-Michel, Aisne, in the Aisne département
- Saint-Michel, Ariège, in the Ariège département
- Saint-Michel, Charente, in the Charente département
- Saint-Michel, Haute-Garonne, in the Haute-Garonne département
- Saint-Michel, Gers, in the Gers département
- Saint-Michel, Hérault, in the Hérault département
- Saint-Michel, Loiret, in the Loiret département
- Saint-Michel, Pyrénées-Atlantiques, in the Pyrénées-Atlantiques département
- Saint-Michel, Tarn-et-Garonne, in the Tarn-et-Garonne département
- Saint-Michel-Chef-Chef, in the Loire-Atlantique département
- Saint-Michel-d'Aurance, in the Ardèche département
- Saint-Michel-de-Bannières, in the Lot département
- Saint-Michel-de-Boulogne, in the Ardèche département
- Saint-Michel-de-Castelnau, in the Gironde département
- Saint-Michel-de-Chabrillanoux, in the Ardèche département
- Saint-Michel-de-Chaillol, in the Hautes-Alpes département
- Saint-Michel-de-Chavaignes, in the Sarthe département
- Saint-Michel-de-Dèze, in the Lozère département
- Saint-Michel-de-Double, in the Dordogne département
- Saint-Michel-de-Feins, in the Mayenne département
- Saint-Michel-de-Fronsac, in the Gironde département
- Saint-Michel-de-Lanès, in the Aude département
- Saint-Michel-de-la-Pierre, in the Manche département
- Saint-Michel-de-Lapujade, in the Gironde département
- Saint-Michel-de-la-Roë, in the Mayenne département
- Saint-Michel-de-Livet, in the Calvados département
- Saint-Michel-de-Llotes, in the Pyrénées-Orientales département
- Saint-Michel-de-Maurienne, in the Savoie département
- Saint-Michel-de-Montaigne, in the Dordogne département
- Saint-Michel-de-Montjoie, in the Manche département
- Saint-Michel-de-Plélan, in the Côtes-d'Armor département
- Saint-Michel-de-Rieufret, in the Gironde département
- Saint-Michel-de-Saint-Geoirs, in the Isère département
- Saint-Michel-des-Andaines, in the Orne département
- Saint-Michel-d'Euzet, in the Gard département
- Saint-Michel-de-Vax, in the Tarn département
- Saint-Michel-de-Veisse, in the Creuse département
- Saint-Michel-de-Villadeix, in the Dordogne département
- Saint-Michel-de-Volangis, in the Cher département
- Saint-Michel-d'Halescourt, in the Seine-Maritime département
- Saint-Michel-en-Beaumont, in the Isère département
- Saint-Michel-en-Brenne, in the Indre département
- Saint-Michel-en-Grève, in the Côtes-d'Armor département
- Saint-Michel-en-l'Herm, in the Vendée département
- Saint-Michel-Escalus, in the Landes département
- Saint-Michel-et-Chanveaux, in the Maine-et-Loire département
- Saint-Michel-Labadié, in the Tarn département
- Saint-Michel-le-Cloucq, in the Vendée département
- Saint-Michel-les-Portes, in the Isère département
- Saint-Michel-l'Observatoire, in the Alpes-de-Haute-Provence département
- Saint-Michel-Loubéjou, in the Lot département
- Saint-Michel-Mont-Mercure, in the Vendée département
- Saint-Michel-sous-Bois, in the Pas-de-Calais département
- Saint-Michel-sur-Loire, in the Indre-et-Loire département
- Saint-Michel-sur-Meurthe, in the Vosges département
- Saint-Michel-sur-Orge, in the Essonne département
- Saint-Michel-sur-Rhône, in the Loire département
- Saint-Michel-sur-Savasse, in the Drôme département
- Saint-Michel-sur-Ternoise, in the Pas-de-Calais département
- Saint-Michel-Tubœuf, in the Orne département
- Saint Mihiel Abbey, in the Meuse département

=== Other places ===
- Saint-Michel, Burkina Faso, a village in Banwa Province
- Saint Michel, Monaco, a modern ward of the district of Monte-Carlo, in the Principality of Monaco
- Saint-Michel-de-Cuxa, a Benedictine abbey in the French Pyrénées-Orientales département
- Saint-Michel-de-l'Atalaye, a community in the Artibonite Department of Haiti
- Sankt Michel (abbrv. S:t Michel), the Swedish name for the Finnish town Mikkeli

== Transit ==
- Saint-Michel station (Paris Metro)
- Saint-Michel station (Montreal Metro), a Montreal Metro station in Montreal, Quebec, Canada
- Saint-Michel–Montréal-Nord station, a commuter rail station in Montreal, Quebec, Canada
- Station Saint-Michel (Tram de Bordeaux), a tram station in Bordeaux, France

== Other uses ==
- AS Saint Michel, a football club based in Antananarivo, Madagascar
- Biscuiterie Saint-Michel, a French food company based in Contres
- Collège Saint-Michel, a Gymnasium school in Fribourg, Switzerland

== See also ==
- Michel (disambiguation)
- Saint Michael (disambiguation)
- Mont Saint Michel (disambiguation)
