= Michal (disambiguation) =

Michal (Hebrew: מיכל) was the daughter of King Saul in the Hebrew Bible, wife of King David.

Michal or Michale may also refer to one of the following:

- Michal, the Czech and Slovak counterpart of the name Michael
- Michal Mine, a former coal mine in Michálkovice, Czech Republic
- Tel Michal, an archaeological site in Israel
- Michale, a village in Poland
- Micah Joseph Lebensohn, Hebrew poet known by pen name Michal

== People with the given name ==
=== Michal ===
- Michal (singer) (born 1983), Polish singer, famous in France
- Michal Biran (born 1978), Israeli politician
- Y. Michal Bodemann (1944–2025), German-Canadian sociologist
- Michal Březina (born 1990), Czech figure skater
- Michal Escapa (born 1937), Israeli paralympic champion
- Michal Feldman (born 1976), Israeli computer scientist
- Michal Frankl (born 1974), Czech historian
- Michal Hein (born 1968), Israeli Olympic windsurfer
- Michal Jagelka (born 1977), Czech actor
- Michal Lamdani (born 1944), Israeli Olympic high jumper
- Michal Menert (born 1982), Polish-born American electronic music producer
- Michal Menet (born 1997), American football player
- Michal Postava (born 2002), Czech ice hockey player
- Michal Rivlin, Israeli neuroscientist
- Michal Rozin (born 1969), Israeli politician and feminist
- Michal Schwartz (born 1950), Israeli professor of neuroimmunology
- Michal Stiborek (1968-2025), Czech economist

=== Michale ===
- Michale Boganim, French Israeli film director and screenwriter
- Michale Fee (born 1964), American neuroscientist
- Michale Graves (born 1975), American singer songwriter
- Michale Kyser (born 1991), American basketball player
- Michale Spicer (born 1982), American defensive end football player

== People with the surname ==
- Fabien Michal (born 1978), French racing driver
- Karel Michal, Czech writer
- Kristen Michal, Estonian politician

== See also ==
- Michał (disambiguation)
