= Michel =

Michel may refer to:

- Michel (name), a given name or surname (and lists of people with the name)
- Míchel (nickname), a nickname (a list of people with the nickname, mainly Spanish footballers)
- Michel (TV series), a Korean animated series
- German auxiliary cruiser Michel
- Michel catalog, a German-language stamp catalog
- St. Michael's Church, Hamburg or Michel
- S:t Michel, a Finnish town in South Savo, Finland
- Deutscher Michel, a national personification of the German people

== See also ==
- Michał (disambiguation)
- Michel parameters
- Michelle (disambiguation)
- Saint-Michel (disambiguation)
