= Charles Michael =

Charles Michael may refer to:

- Charles W. Michael (died 1915), American politician, member of the Maryland Senate
- Charles Michael, Duke of Mecklenburg (1863–1934), officer in the Imperial Russian Army

== See also ==
- Charles Michel (disambiguation)
- Michael Charles (born 1956), Australian blues musician, songwriter, guitarist, and singer
