= Sebag =

Sebag may refer to:

== Surname ==
- Jean-Claude Sebag (born 1943), French lawyer and politician
- Lucien Sebag (1933–1965), French Marxist anthropologist
- Marie Sebag (born 1986), French chess player
- Michèle Sebag, French computer scientist
- Paul Sebag (1919–2004), French-Tunisian sociologist and historian
- Roy Sebag (born 1985), Israeli-Canadian investor and author
- Solomon Sebag (1828–1892), English educator and Hebrew writer
- Uri Sebag (born 1931), Israeli politician

== Given name ==
- Sebag Shaw (1906–1982), British barrister and judge

== See also ==
- Sebag-Montefiore, a surname
