= Raynald Leclerc =

Canadian painter

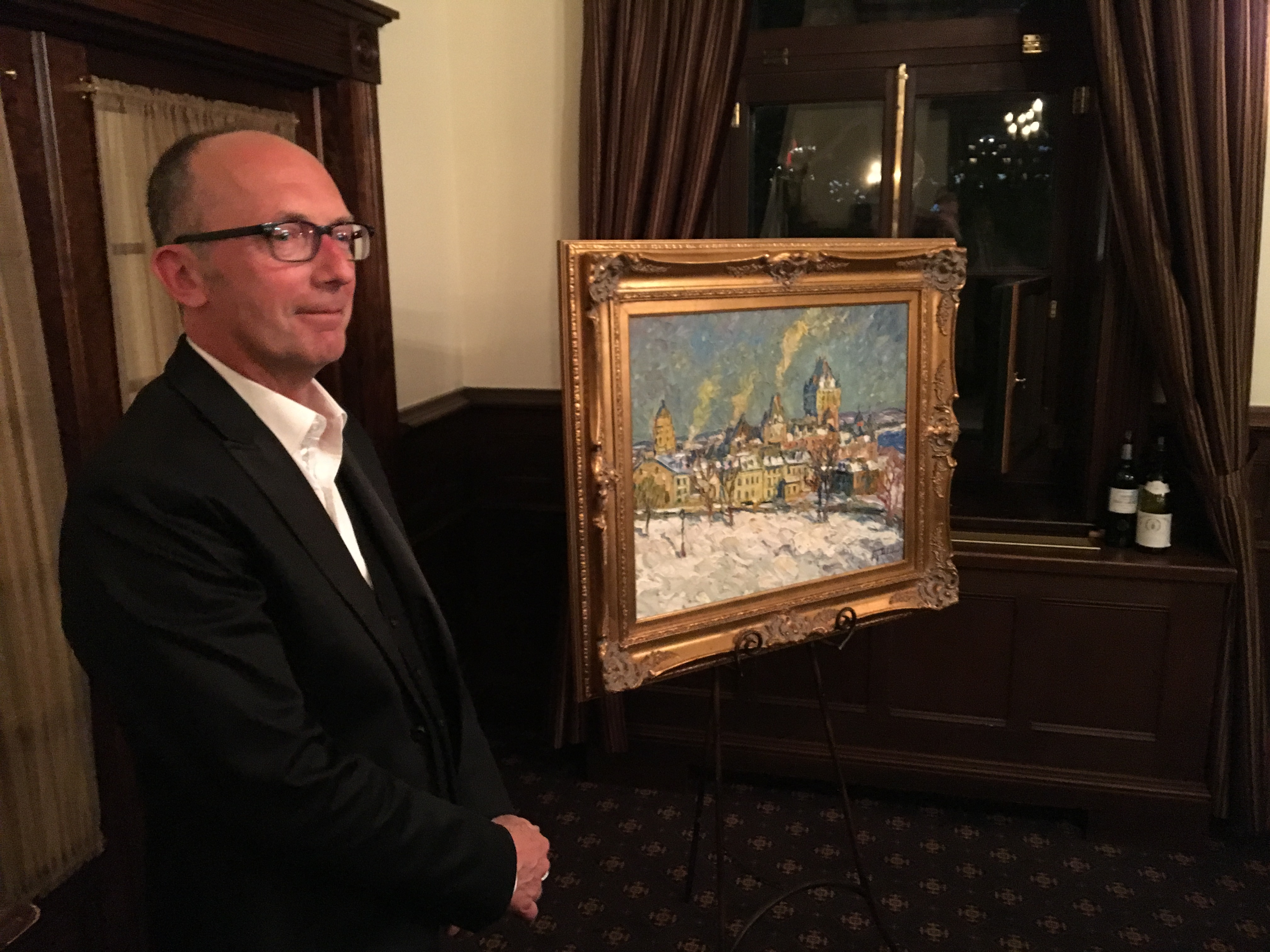
- Born: December 12, 1961 (age 64); Saint-Michel-de-Bellechasse, Quebec, Canada
- Known for: Landscape painting, impasto

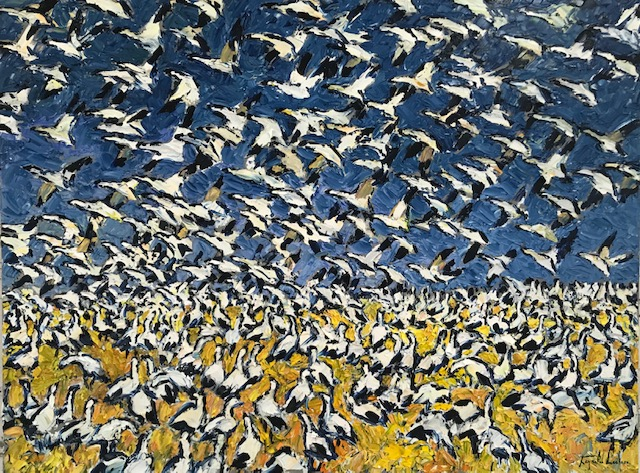
Envolée des oies, Quebec, Canada.

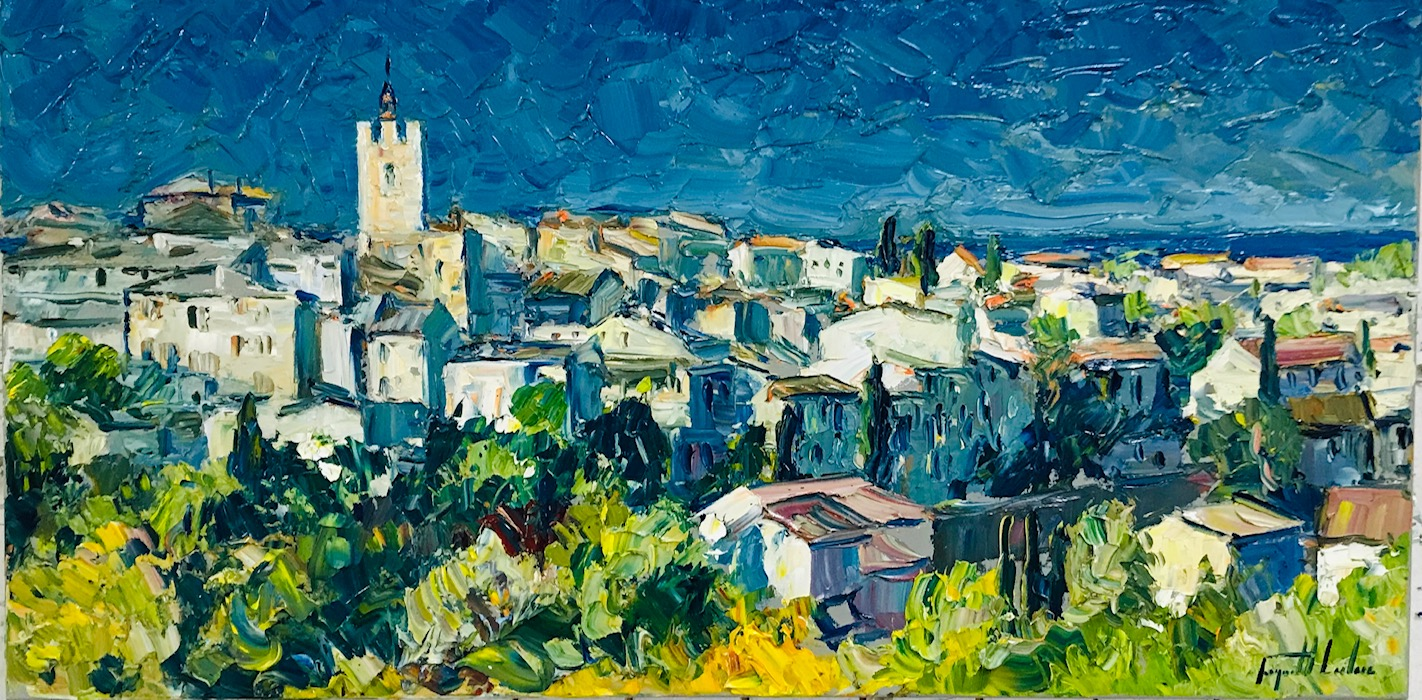
Saint-Paul-de-Vence, France.

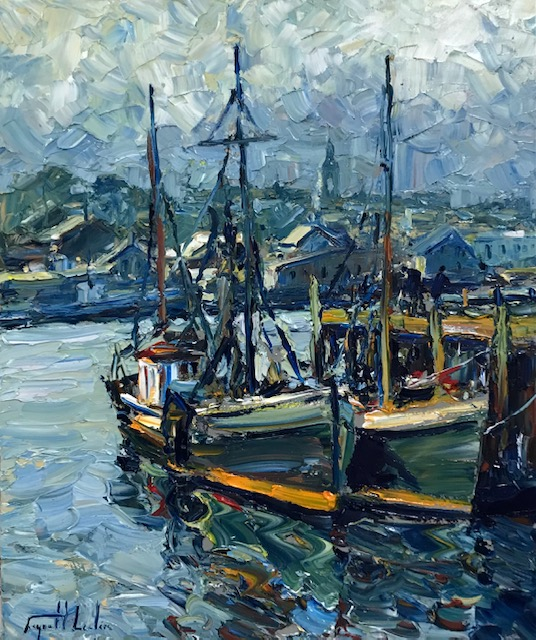
Gloucester (Massachusetts), USA.

Raynald Leclerc, born on 12 December 1961, is a Canadian painter.

== Biography ==
Raynald Leclerc is a self-taught painter. He grew up along the Saint Lawrence River, which features in many of his works. The youngest of five children, he showed an early interest in drawing and, as a teenager, produced ship illustrations that he sold to visitors.

At 16, he began studies in architectural drawing at the Cégep de Lévis. In the early 1980s, he was introduced to the art world by established painters.

Leclerc has used the same palette knife for over 35 years (as he noted in 2016) and works exclusively with pure paint, with no additives or fillers.

== Career ==
Raynald Leclerc entered the professional art world in November 1984 in Quebec City, at the gallery of Lionel Tremblay. He later exhibited at Galerie Le Chien D’Or in Quebec City on April 10, 1988.

In 1989, Leclerc presented around fifteen works at the Île-des-Moulins Art Gallery in Terrebonne. In his review, journalist Pierre Danzelm highlighted the play on light and spontaneous quality of Leclerc’s painting, comparing it in some respects to that of Claude Monet.

Leclerc continued his career with several exhibitions in Quebec, including at Galerie du Vieux Village in Boucherville on October 15, 1989.

He also exhibited at Galerie d’art La Falaise in Sherbrooke on January 26, 1992 and at Galerie Symbole Art in Montreal on November 3, 1996.

The exhibition Au cœur du Vieux-Québec opened on April 26, 2003 at the Galerie d’art internationale de Québec. In 2008, as part of Quebec City’s 400th anniversary, his works were exhibited at the Galerie d’art internationale de Québec. This collaboration continued with exhibitions in 2010 with L’île d’Orléans, in 2012 with Dans le sillage du Saint-Laurent, and in 2016 with Leclerc au fil de l’eau.

In 2013 and 2017, his works were presented at the West End Gallery in Edmonton.

From 2013 onward, stays in Provence inspired a series of paintings from Leclerc dedicated to the region. In 2014, around forty paintings were exhibited in Quebec and at Domaine Souviou in France. In 2015, Galerie Hesbé Bolzonello in Saint-Paul-de-Vence exhibited eight new works of his.

In 2019, the exhibition Leclerc à vol d’oiseau presented aerial perspectives of Quebec City from a "bird's eye view". In 2025, Les Oies continued this theme.

== Style ==
Leclerc’s style is divided into two phases: an early phase characterized by precise lines and lightly painted canvases, followed by a shift toward palette knife work in impasto, rich in texture. Unlike Impressionists, who dissolve forms through light, Leclerc treats light as a material component, emphasized through thick impasto and vivid colors.

== Awards and distinctions ==
- 9 October 2000: First prize at the 12th Mascouche Painting Festival.
- 2 June 2017: Tribute to Raynald Leclerc at the Cercle de la Garnison de Québec under the presidency of the Hon. Michel Doyon, Lieutenant Governor of Quebec.

== Gallery ==
These photos are generously placed in the public domain by the artist.

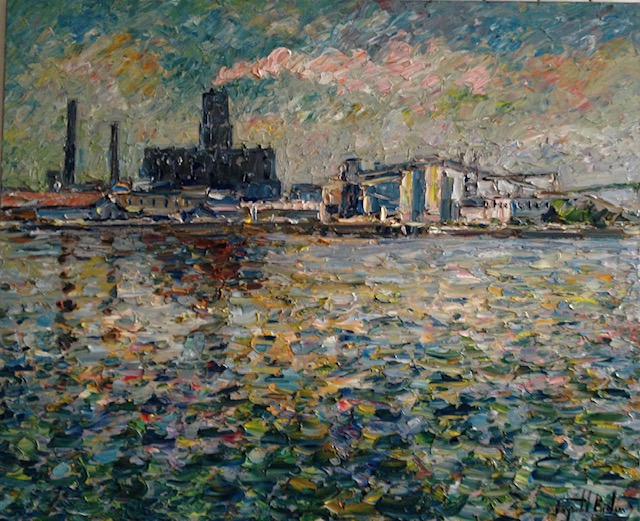
L'usine, port de Québec, Canada

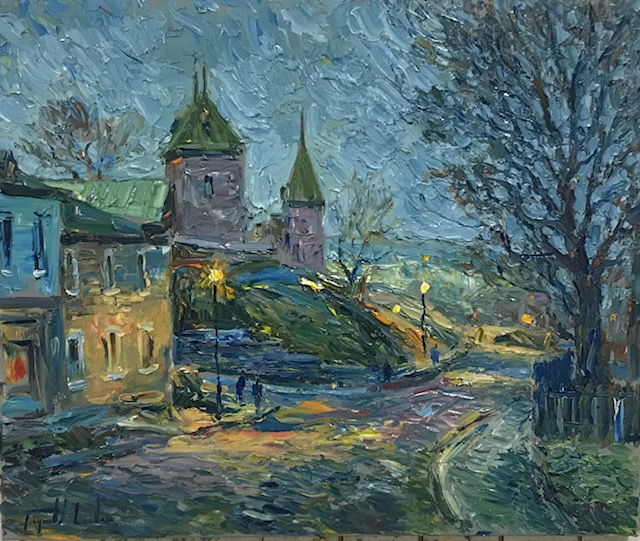
A la tombée de la nuit, rue de la Citadelle, Ville de Québec

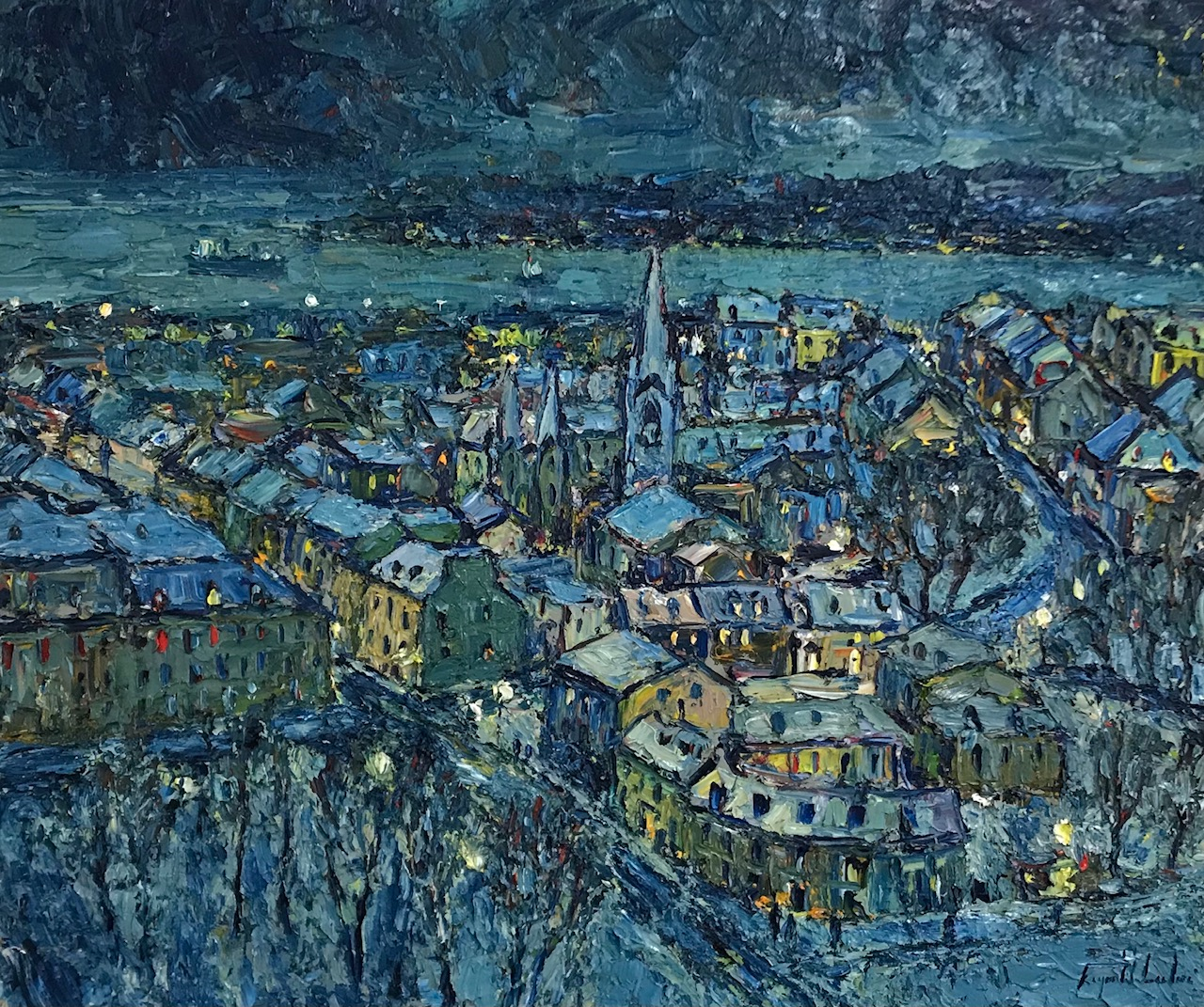
Québec à vol d'oiseau, Canada

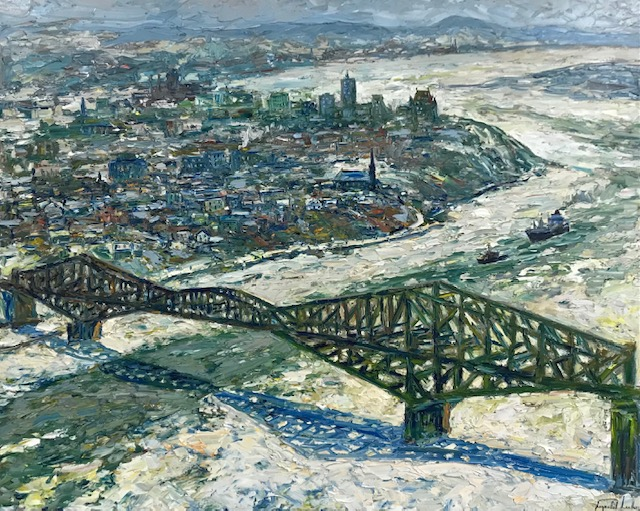
Le pont de Québec vu du ciel, Canada

== Bibliography ==
- Investir dans les oeuvres d’art Tome III, Louis Bruens, Montréal, Éditions La Palette, 1988, 375 p., ISBN 2-9801060-1-1, p. 269.
- Québec en peinture, Jacques de Roussan, Québec, Roussan Éditeur Inc., 1989, 167 p., ISBN 2-9800915-8-8, p. 124-127.
- Peinture, culture et réalités québécoises, Louis Bruens, Sainte-Agathe, Éditions La Palette, 1992, 112 p., ISBN 2-9801060-7-0, p. 43, 93.
- Guide De Roussan, Marc de Roussan, Montréal, Roussan éditeur Inc., 1996, 170 p., ISBN 2-921212-25-0, p. 102
- Guide De Roussan, Marc de Roussan, Montréal, Roussan éditeur Inc., 1999, 288 p., ISBN 2-921212-50-1, p. 165
- Sculpter la lumière, Michel Bois, Magazin’Art, Summer 2005, p.112-115.
- A Canadian Artist's Journey, Robert Filion, édition Lithochic, design L'Orange Bleue, 2013, 32 p.
- Leclerc en Provence, Robert Filion, édition Sylvain Harvey, 2014, 66 p.,ISBN 978-2-923794-67-9.

== See also ==
- Bruno Côté
- Jean Paul Riopelle
