= Saint-Michel, Quebec =

Saint-Michel
- Municipality
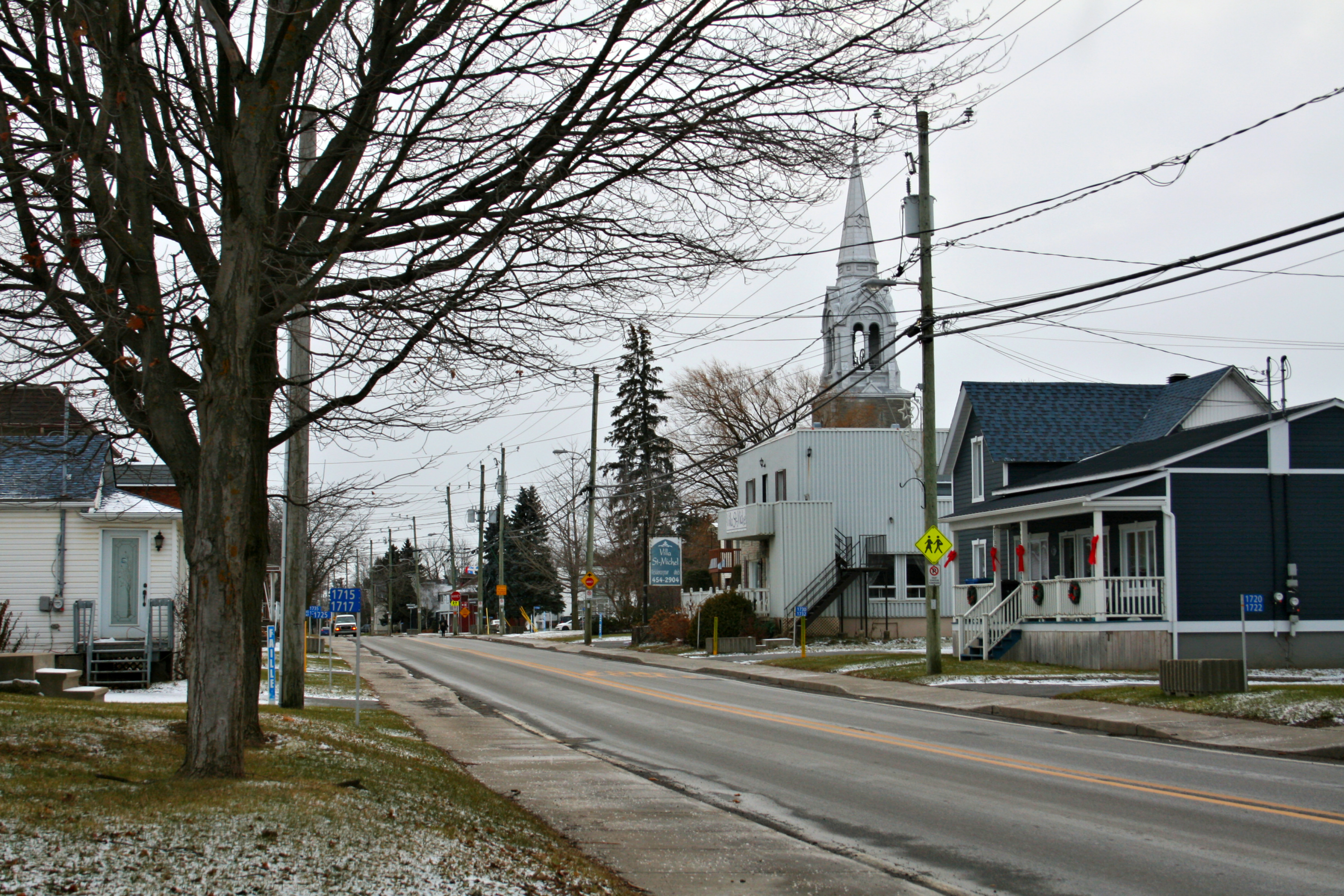

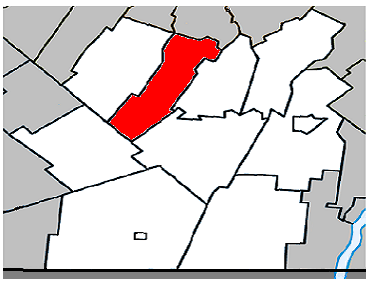
- Location within Les Jardins-de-Napierville RCM

- Location in southern Quebec
- Coordinates: 45°14′N 73°34′W
- Country: Canada
- Province: Quebec
- Region: Montérégie
- RCM: Les Jardins-de-Napierville
- Constituted: July 1, 1855

Government
  - Mayor: Jean-Guy Hamelin
  - Federal riding: Châteauguay—Les Jardins-de-Napierville
  - Prov. riding: Huntingdon

Area
  - Total: 60.30 km^{2} (23.28 sq mi)
  - Land: 59.82 km^{2} (23.10 sq mi)

Population (2021)
  - Total: 3,521
  - Density: 58.9/km^{2} (153/sq mi)
  - Pop (2016-21): ▲10.5%
  - Dwellings: 1,296
- Time zone: UTC−5 (EST)
  - Summer (DST): UTC−4 (EDT)
- Postal code(s): J0L 2J0
- Area codes: 450 and 579
- Highways: R-221
- Website: municipalite-saint-michel.ca

Saint-Michel, also known as Saint-Michel-de-Napierville (French pronunciation: [sɛ̃ miʃɛl də napjɛʁvil]), is a municipality in the Jardins de Napierville Regional County Municipality in Quebec, Canada, situated in the Montérégie administrative region. The population as of the 2021 Canadian census was 3,521.

== History ==
The place was originally known as La Pigeonnière or Lapigeonnière, named after the Pigeon family. In 1853, the parish of Saint-Michel or Saint-Archange was formed, named in honour of Michael the Archangel. In 1854, its post office opened under the name Lapigeonnière. The Parish Municipality of Saint-Michel was created on July 1, 1855, when the county of Huntingdon was disbanded into multiple municipalities.

The first school opened on 2 November 1865 with 100 pupils. Three nuns, the Sisters of Sainte-Anne, were in charge until 24 August 1962, when the pupils moved to the current central school. After 42 years of existence, the convent was demolished. On 21 January 1937, the church tower, which has three bells and is 185 feet high, gave way in the wind. When it was repaired, it was lowered by 50 feet. Another event took place on 7 June 1949: a fire broke out in a village barn and destroyed 15 buildings, including 7 houses in the heart of the village. The cost of repairs was $125,000.

On December 10, 2011, the parish municipality changed statutes and became a regular municipality.

A sewage system serving 580 homes was inaugurated on 26 August 2011, and a new fire station was opened on 21 September 2013. On 19 September 2015, an enlarged and refreshed municipal hall (now the community centre) with air-conditioned rooms was inaugurated.

== Demographics ==
=== Population ===
Canada census – Saint-Michel community profile

	2021	2016	2011
Population	3,521 (+10.5% from 2016)	3,186 (+10.5% from 2011)	2,884 (+9.4% from 2006)
Land area	59.82 km^{2} (23.10 sq mi)	59.98 km^{2} (23.16 sq mi)	59.86 km^{2} (23.11 sq mi)
Population density	58.9/km^{2} (153/sq mi)	53.1/km^{2} (138/sq mi)	48.2/km^{2} (125/sq mi)
Median age	39.2 (M: 40.0, F: 38.4)	38.5 (M: 38.5, F: 38.4)	37.3 (M: 36.7, F: 37.9)
Private dwellings	1,296 (total) 1,259 (occupied)	1,217 (total)	1,067 (total)
Median household income	$101,000	$78,190	$70,544

Notes: 2011 income data for this area has been suppressed for data quality or confidentiality reasons.
References: 2021 2016 2011

Historical Census Data - Saint-Michel, Quebec

Year	Pop.	±%
1861	2,548	—
1871	1,986	−22.1%
1881	1,651	−16.9%
1891	1,619	−1.9%
1901	1,336	−17.5%
1911	1,235	−7.6%
1921	1,194	−3.3%
1931	1,262	+5.7%

Year	Pop.	±%
1941	1,309	+3.7%
1951	1,340	+2.4%
1956	1,394	+4.0%
1961	1,469	+5.4%
1966	1,480	+0.7%
1971	1,516	+2.4%
1976	1,604	+5.8%
1981	1,792	+11.7%

Year	Pop.	±%
1986	1,739	−3.0%
1991	2,113	+21.5%
1996	2,451	+16.0%
2001	2,532	+3.3%
2006	2,637	+4.1%
2011	2,884	+9.4%
2016	3,186	+10.5%
2021	3,521	+10.5%

Source: Statistics Canada

=== Language ===
Canada Census Mother Tongue - Saint-Michel, Quebec
Census	Total	French			English			French & English			Other		
Year	Responses	Count	Trend	Pop %	Count	Trend	Pop %	Count	Trend	Pop %	Count	Trend	Pop %
2021	3,520	3,270	▲7.9%	92.9%	50	▼9.1%	1.4%	110	▲1,000.0%	3.1%	80	0.0%	2.3%
2016	3,170	3,030	▲10.4%	95.6%	55	▲37.6%	1.7%	10	▼66.7%	0.3%	80	▲14.3%	2.5%
2011	2,885	2,745	▲7.9%	95.15%	40	▲33.3%	1.39%	30	▲50.0%	1.04%	70	▲133.3%	2.43%
2006	2,625	2,545	▲2.0%	96.95%	30	▲200.0%	1.14%	20	▲ n/a%	0.76%	30	▲50.0%	1.14%
2001	2,525	2,495	▲5.7%	98.81%	10	▼33.3%	0.40%	0	0.0%	0.00%	20	▼71.4%	0.79%
1996	2,445	2,360	n/a	96.52%	15	n/a	0.61%	0	n/a	0.00%	70	n/a	2.86%

== Government ==
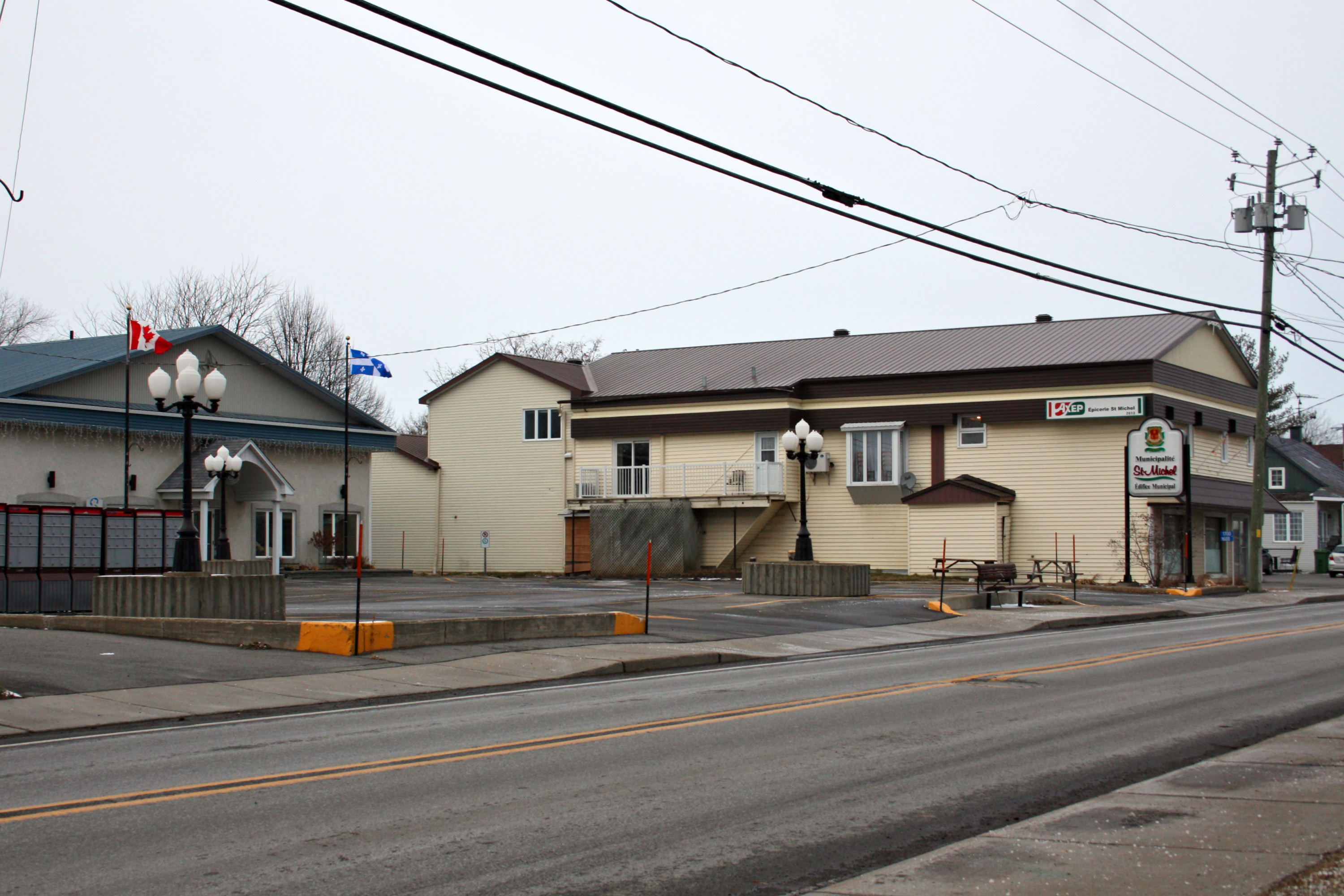
Municipal hall of St-Michel

List of former mayors:

- Camille Coupal (1855–1858)
- Joseph Pépin (1858–1860)
- François Coupal (1860–1864)
- Vital Perras (1864–1866)
- Michel Bourdeau (1866–1868)
- Narcisse Doris (1868–1870)
- Honoré Patenaude (1870–1872)
- Pierre Isabelle (1872–1874)
- Amable Coupal (1874–1876)
- Casimir Gagnon (1876–1879)
- Napoléon Coupal (1879–1880)
- François-Xavier Paradis (1880–1881)
- Théophile Robert (1881–1885)
- Adolphe Coupal (1885–1887)
- Pierre Giroux (1887–1888)
- Napoléon Monette (1888–1889)
- Louis Trudeau (1889–1890)
- Siméon Robidou (1890–1891)
- Joseph Toupin (1891–1893)
- Cyprien Doris (1893–1905)
- François-Xavier Coupal (1905–1906)
- Émilien Lahaie (1906–1911)
- Simon Verner (1911–1912)
- Vital Poissant (1912–1913)
- Séverin Coupal (1913–1914)
- Noé Pigeon (1914–1916)
- Adélard Perrier (1916–1917)
- Octave Usereau (1917–1919, 1927–1931)
- David Inkel (1919–1921)
- Alfred Marcil (1921–1923, 1931–1933)
- Hilaire Lemire (1923–1925)
- Joseph Adélard Hamelin (1925–1927)
- Fridolin Blouin (1933–1936)
- Domina Faille (1936–1937)
- Pierre Lemoyne (1935–1939, 1945–1949)
- Joseph E. Ricard (1939–1945)
- Joseph Rodrigue Oligny (1949–1953)
- Ernest Dulude (1953–1957)
- Léopold Marcil (1957–1961)
- Léonard Laforest (1961–1965)
- Lionel Sorel (1965–1973)
- Roland Daigneault (1973–1993)
- Marcel Roy (1993–2005)
- Michel Lussier (2005–2009)
- Pierre Raymond Cloutier (2009–2013)
- Jean Guy Hamelin (2013–present)

== Education ==
The Riverside School Board operates anglophone public schools, including:

- John Adam Memorial School in Delson
- Saint-Lambert International High School in Saint-Lambert

== See also ==
- List of municipalities in Quebec
- Saint-Michel
