= La Durantaye, Quebec =

La Durantaye
- Parish municipality
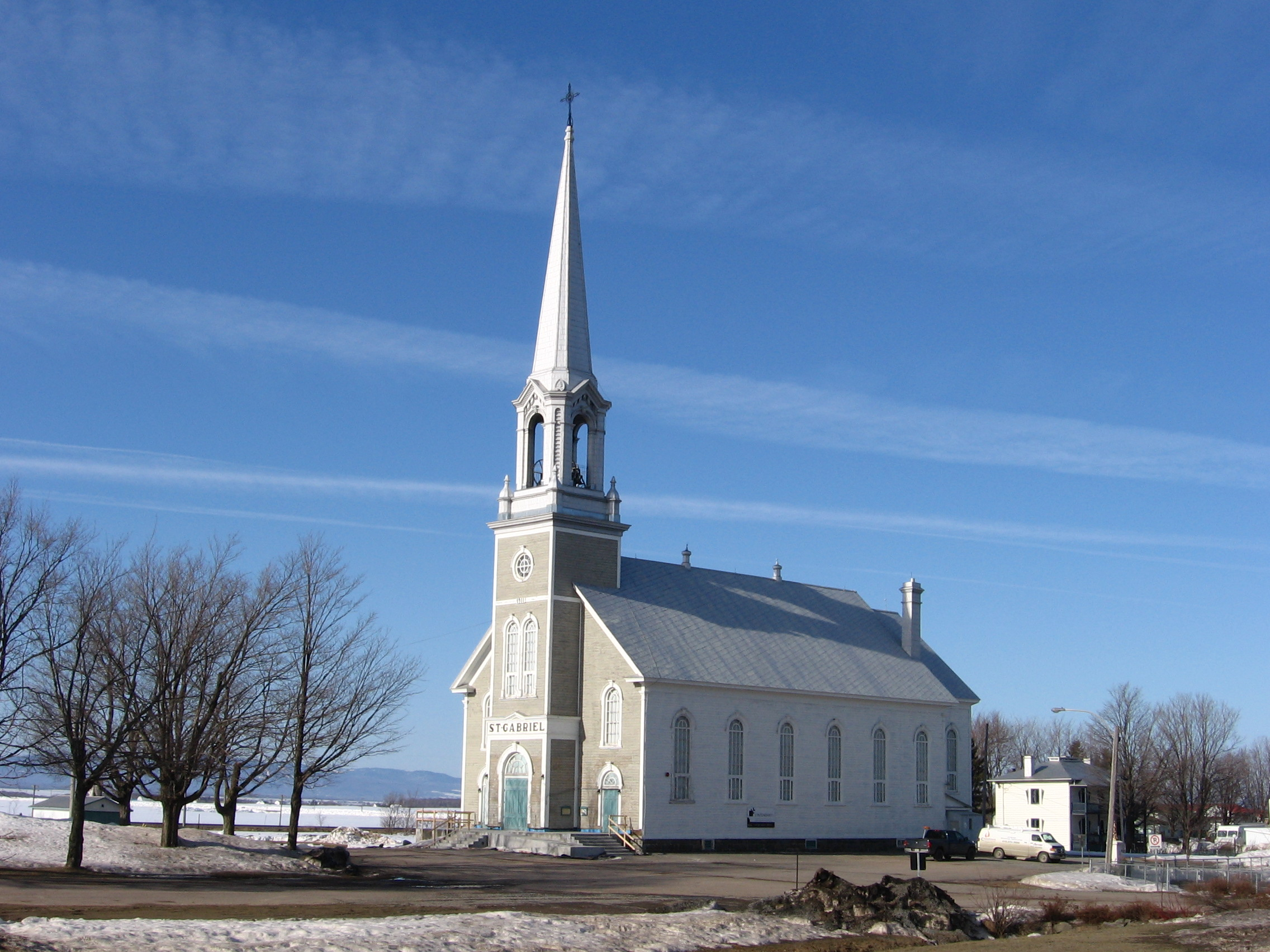

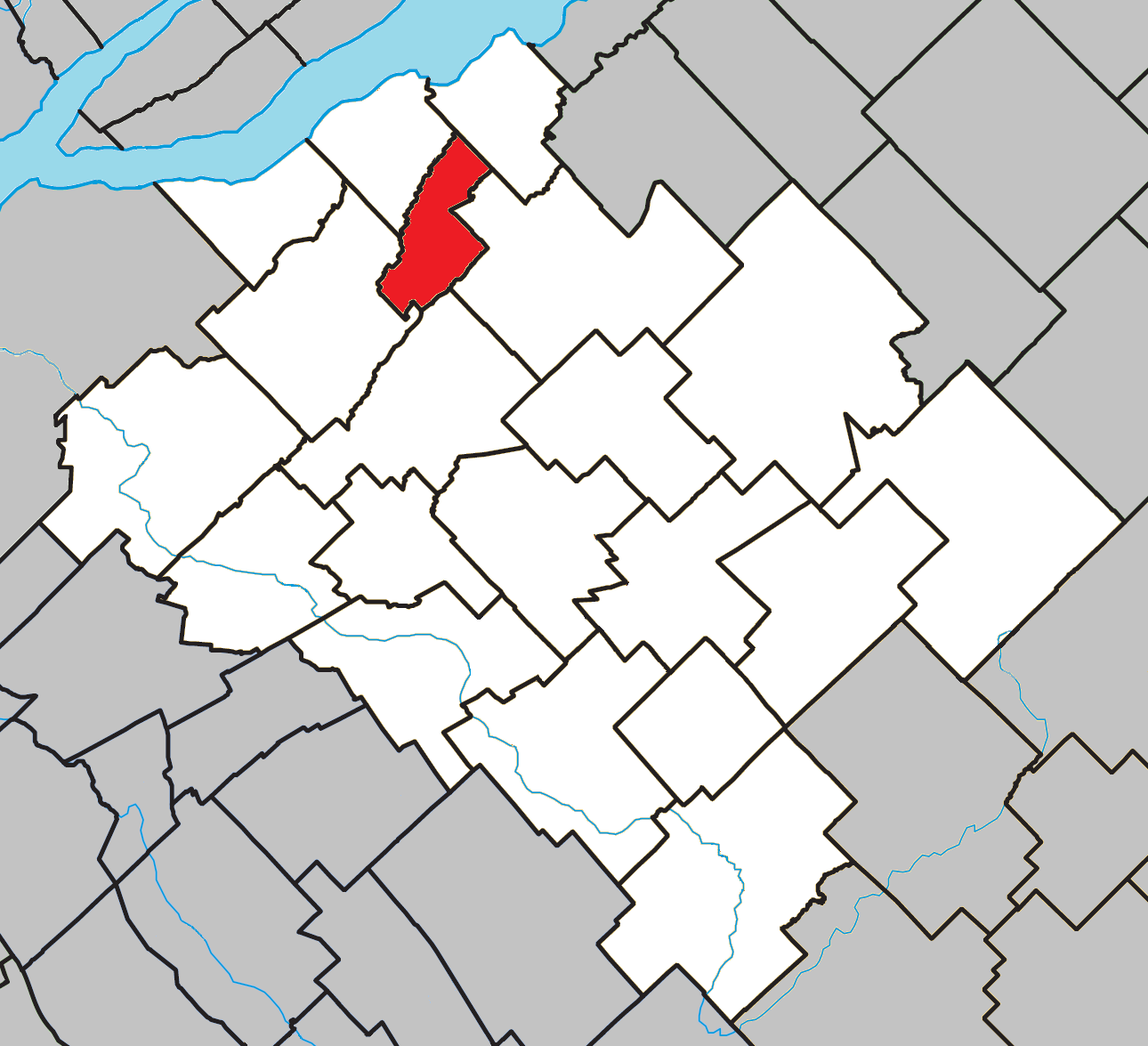
- Location within Bellechasse RCM.

- Location in province of Quebec.
- Coordinates: 46°50′N 70°51′W
- Country: Canada
- Province: Quebec
- Region: Chaudière-Appalaches
- RCM: Bellechasse
- Constituted: August 4, 1910
- Named for: Olivier Morel de La Durantaye

Government
  - Mayor: Yvon Dumont
  - Federal riding: Bellechasse—Les Etchemins—Lévis
  - Prov. riding: Bellechasse

Area
  - Total: 34.30 km^{2} (13.24 sq mi)
  - Land: 34.99 km^{2} (13.51 sq mi)
- There is an apparent contradiction between two authoritative sources

Population (2021)
  - Total: 782
  - Density: 22.3/km^{2} (58/sq mi)
  - Pop 2016-2021: ▲3.6%
  - Dwellings: 374
- Time zone: UTC−5 (EST)
  - Summer (DST): UTC−4 (EDT)
- Postal code(s): G0R 1W0
- Area codes: 418 and 581
- Highways: R-281
- Website: www.munladurantaye.qc.ca

La Durantaye is a parish municipality in the Bellechasse Regional County Municipality in the Chaudière-Appalaches administrative region of Quebec.

The municipality had a population of 782 in the Canada 2021 Census.

== History ==
The municipality, along with Saint-Michel-de-Bellechasse and Saint-Vallier, is located on the territory of the former fief of La Durantaye, granted in 1672 by Governor Frontenac to Olivier Morel de La Durantaye, then captain of the Carignan-Salières Regiment. The municipality was officially created in 1913 under the name of Saint-Gabriel-Archange. Three years later, the name was changed to La Durantaye.

== Demographics ==
In the 2021 Census of Population conducted by Statistics Canada, La Durantaye had a population of 782 living in 339 of its 374 total private dwellings, a change of 3.6% from its 2016 population of 755. With a land area of 34.99 km^{2} (13.51 sq mi), it had a population density of 22.3/km^{2} (57.9/sq mi) in 2021.
