= Laurent Catellier =

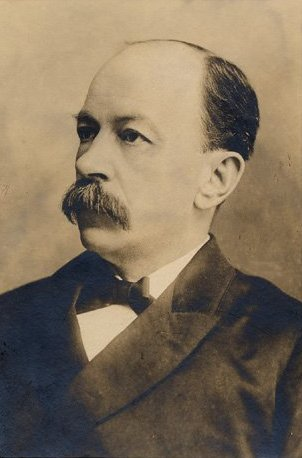
- Born: 5 September 1839; Saint-Vallier, Lower Canada
- Died: 17 January 1918 (aged 78); Quebec City, Quebec, Canada
- Occupations: physician and professor

Laurent Catellier (5 September 1839 – 17 January 1918) was a Canadian physician and professor.

Born in Saint-Vallier, Lower Canada, Catellier studied at the Petit Séminaire de Québec before receiving a bachelor's degree in medicine from the Université Laval in 1863. In 1865, he received a degree of doctor of medicine. In 1870, he became special professor of practical anatomy at the Université Laval's faculty of medicine and became a full professor in 1874. In 1905, he was appointed dean of the faculty of medicine. He retired in 1910 and was made a professor emeritus.
