= Cégep de Lévis =

Public college in Lévis, Quebec

Coordinates: 46°48′58.08″N 71°9′8.70″W

- Motto: La passion du savoir (French)
- Motto in English: The passion for learning, or The passion for knowledge
- Type: public CEGEP
- Established: 1967
- Academic affiliations: ACCC, CCAA, QSSF, AUCC,
- Location: Lévis, Quebec, Canada
- Campus: Urban
- Website: cegeplevis.ca/

Cégep de Lévis, formerly known as Cégep de Lévis-Lauzon, is a CEGEP in Lévis, Quebec, Canada.

== History ==
In 1967, several institutions were merged and became public, when the Quebec system of CEGEPs was created.

In August 2020, the CEGEP's management unveiled its name change and new visual identity.

== Programs ==
The Province of Quebec awards a Diploma of Collegial Studies for two types of programs: two years of pre-university studies or three years of vocational (technical) studies. The pre-university programs, which take two years to complete, cover the subject matters which roughly correspond to the additional year of high school, as well as the freshman year, given elsewhere in Canada. The technical programs, which take three-years to complete, applies to students who wish to pursue a skill trade. In addition Continuing education and services to business are provided.

== Notable alumni ==
- Raynald Leclerc

== See also ==
- List of colleges in Quebec
- Higher education in Quebec
