= Philippe Michel =

Philippe Michel may refer to:

- Philippe Michel (economist) (1937–2004)
- Philippe Michel (number theorist) (born 1969)
- Philippe Michel (boxer)
- Philippe Michel-Kleisbauer, French politician
- Prince Philippe Michel of Ligne (born 1977), a Prince of Ligne
