= Mont Saint Michel (disambiguation) =

Mont Saint Michel is a commune and island off the coast of Normandy, France.

Mont Saint Michel may refer to:

== Places ==
=== France ===
- Mont-Saint-Michel Abbey, the abbey on the island
- Mont-Saint-Michel Bay, which surrounds the island
- Mont Saint-Michel (Alsace), a hill in the Vosges, France

=== Canada ===
- Mont-Saint-Michel, Quebec, a municipality in Canada

== Others ==
- MV Mont St Michel, a ferry operated by Brittany Ferries
- Le Mont Saint Michel (clothing), a company for clothing

== See also ==
- Monte San Michele, a hill in Gorizia, Italy
- St Michael's Mount, an island off the coast of Cornwall, England
