= Michel Randrianekena =

Malagasy politician

Michel Randrianekena is a Malagasy politician. A member of the National Assembly of Madagascar, he was elected as a member of the Tiako I Madagasikara party; he represents the constituency of Nosy Varika.
