= Nichelle =

Nichelle is a given name. Notable people with the name include:

- Nichelle Nichols (1932–2022), American actress, singer, and voice artist
- Nichelle Prince (born 1995), Canadian soccer player
- Nichelle Tramble Spellman (born 1967), American television producer and writer

== See also ==
- Nischelle Turner, American reporter and correspondent
- Michelle (name)
