= Martín Michel =

Martín Michel may refer to:

- Martín Michel (footballer) (born 1983), Argentine footballer
- Martín Michel (judoka) (born 1994), Bolivian judoka
