= Michel Pereira (disambiguation) =

Michel Pereira may refer to:

- Michel Pereira (born 1993), Brazilian mixed martial artist
- Michel Garbini Pereira (born 1981), Brazilian footballer
- Michell Pereira (born 1982), Sri Lankan cricketer

== See also ==
- Michaël Pereira (born 1987), French footballer
- Michaela Pereira (born 1970), Canadian television personality
- Michael Pereira (field hockey) (1932-2019), Kenyan field hockey player
- Mickaël Pereira (born 1991), Portuguese footballer
