= Alain Michel =

Alain Michel may refer to:

- Alain Michel (football manager) (born 1948), French football manager
- Alain Michel (motorcyclist) (born 1953), French sidecar racer
