= Thomas Michel (basketball) =

German basketball player (born 1995)

No. 34 – RheinStars Köln
- Position: Forward
- League: ProB

Personal information
- Born: February 9, 1995 (age 31) Bonn, Germany
- Listed height: 6 ft 6 in (1.98 m)
- Listed weight: 198 lb (90 kg)

Career information
- Playing career: 2012–present

Career history
- 2012–2018: Telekom Baskets Bonn
- 2018–present: RheinStars Köln

Thomas Michel (born 9 February 1995) is a German professional basketball player who formerly played for Telekom Baskets Bonn of the German Basketball League.
