= Michel Tremblay (disambiguation) =

Michel Tremblay is a Quebec playwright.

Michel Tremblay may also refer to:

- Michel Tremblay (politician) (born 1933), Quebec politician

== See also ==
- Roland Michel Tremblay (born 1972), French-Canadian writer
