= Michal Stiborek =

Czech economist and manager (1968–2025)

Michal Stiborek (1 June 1968 – 8 August 2025) was a Czech economist and manager. He was the director of the Institute for Clinical and Experimental Medicine (IKEM) from 2019 to 2023.

== Life and career ==
Stiborek was born on 1 June 1968, and graduated from the Prague University of Economics and Business in Prague and MBA from Nottingham Trent University. He worked in the private sector for more than a decade.

On 1 January 2019, he became the director of the Institute for Clinical and Experimental Medicine (IKEM). In May 2023 he defended his position, receiving 12 of the 15 votes of the members of the selection committee.

Stiborek died on 8 August 2025, at the age of 57.

== Controversy ==
On 18 August 2023, he resigned from the position of director due to the hospital procurement scandal and his statutory deputy, Jiří Malý, was entrusted with the management of IKEM. On 16 August 2024, the National Headquarters Against Organized Crime shelved the case of hospital contracts.

On 6 October 2023, the General Inspectorate of the Security Forces charged him and his deputy Jiří Malý and the head of IT, Petr Raška, on suspicion of committing the crime of blackmailing Jan Pirk and the head of the cardiovascular surgery clinic at IKEM, Ivan Netuka. On 8 August 2025, the court set the start of the trial for 13 October of the same year. On the same day, however, Stiborek died as a result of a serious illness.
