= Jean-Louis Michel =

Jean-Louis Michel may refer to:

- Jean-Louis Michel (fencer)
- Jean-Louis Michel (oceanographer)
