= Thomas Michel =

Thomas Michel, founding director of the Boston Squeezebox Ensemble, during the Ig Nobel Prize ceremony 2026 in Zurich

Thomas Michel (born 1955) is a Professor in Medicine at Harvard Medical School interested in the intracellular pathways regulating the endothelial isoform of nitric oxide synthase (eNOS). He is a well-regarded researcher and educator. Between June 2008 and 2010, Thomas Michel was named Dean for Education at Harvard Medical School.

He graduated from Harvard College and Duke University School of Medicine.

Thomas Michel regularly performed at the Ig Nobel Prize ceremonies.
