= André Michel =

André Michel may refer to:

- André Michel (art historian), French art historian, teacher and curator
- André Michel (director), French film director and screenwriter
- André Michel (lawyer), human rights and anti-corruption lawyer and opposition leader in Haiti
