= Saint-Michel-de-Veisse =

Commune in Nouvelle-Aquitaine, France

- Commune
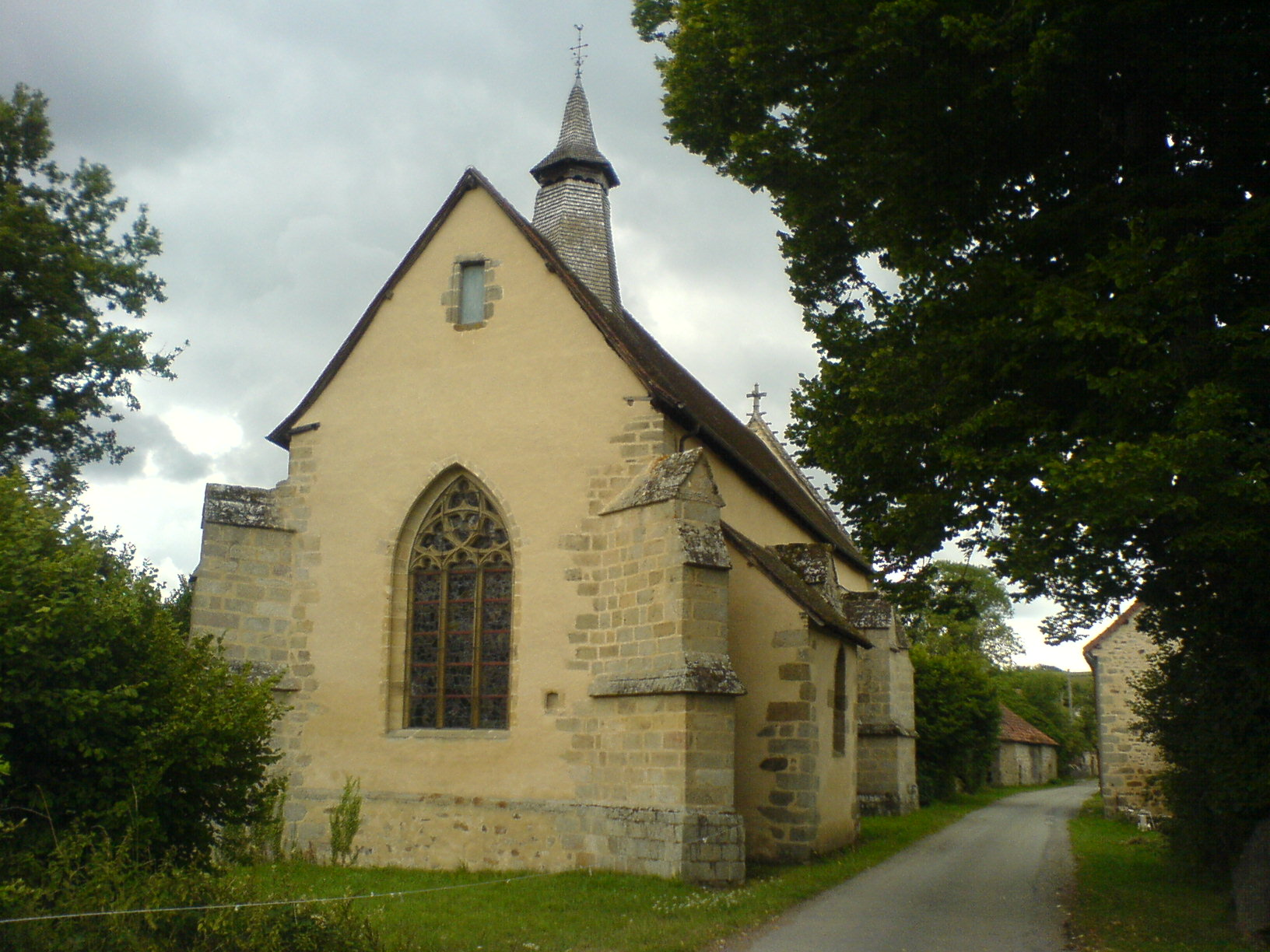
- The chapel in Saint-Michel-de-Veisse
- Location of Saint-Michel-de-Veisse
- Location within France Location within Nouvelle-Aquitaine
- Coordinates: 45°57′09″N 2°03′17″E
- Country: France
- Region: Nouvelle-Aquitaine
- Department: Creuse
- Arrondissement: Guéret
- Canton: Ahun
- Intercommunality: CC Creuse Sud Ouest

Government
  - Mayor (2020–2026): Catherine Defemme
- Area^{1}: 15.57 km^{2} (6.01 sq mi)
- Elevation: 650 m (2,130 ft)
- Highest elevation: 681 m (2,234 ft)
- Lowest elevation: 539 m (1,768 ft)
- Population (2023): 165
  - Density: 10.6/km^{2} (27.4/sq mi)
- Time zone: UTC+01:00 (CET)
  - Summer (DST): UTC+02:00 (CEST)
- INSEE/Postal code: 23222 /23480
- ^{1} French Land Register data, which excludes lakes, ponds, glaciers > 1 km^{2} (0.386 sq mi or 247 acres) and river estuaries.

Saint-Michel-de-Veisse (French pronunciation: [sɛ̃ miʃɛl də vɛs]; Occitan: Sent Michiu de Vaissa) is a commune in the Creuse department in central France.

== Population ==
Historical population
Year	Pop.	±% p.a.
1968	268	—
1975	200	−4.09%
1982	204	+0.28%
1990	177	−1.76%
1999	177	+0.00%
2007	161	−1.18%
2012	172	+1.33%
2017	162	−1.19%
2023	165	+0.31%
Source: INSEE

== See also ==
- Communes of the Creuse department
