= Michel Hamaide =

French politician

- Born: September 3, 1936 (age 89); Paris, France
- Occupation: Politician

Michel Hamaide (born 1936) is a French politician.

== Early life ==
Michel Hamaide was born on September 3, 1936, in Paris, France.

== Career ==
He served as a member of the fifth legislature of the National Assembly from September 30, 1986, to May 14, 1988, representing Var.
