= Jean Michel =

Jean Michel may refer to:

- Jean Michel (fencer), French Olympic fencer
- Jean Michel (poet) (died 1501), French dramatic poet
- Jean Michel (politician) (1949–2025), French politician

== See also ==
- Jean-Michel, French masculine given name
