= Michele Beevors =

New Zealand-based Australian sculptor

- Born: 1964 (age 61–62); Sydney, Australia

Academic background
- Education: City Art Institute, Sydney (Bachelor of Visual Art, 1987; Graduate Diploma, 1988); Australian National University (MA, 1993); Columbia University (MFA, 1997)

Academic work
- Institutions: Otago Polytechnic (Head of Sculpture)
- Notable works: debbiedoesdisney (2008); The Wreck of Hope (2014); Anatomy Lessons (2018)
- Website: www.michelebeevors.org

Michele Beevors (born 1964) is an Australian sculptor based in Dunedin, New Zealand. She is the head of the Sculpture Department at Otago Polytechnic's School of Arts.

== Life and career ==
Michele Beevors was born in Sydney, Australia, in 1964. She received a Bachelor of Visual Art in 1987 and a Graduate Diploma in 1988 from Sydney's City Art Institute. In 1993 she obtained a Master of Arts from the Australian National University. She then studied abroad, completing a Master of Fine Arts at Columbia University, New York, in 1997. In 2000, Beevors began lecturing in art history and sculpture at a tertiary education college in Campbelltown, New South Wales. In 2004 she began lecturing in sculpture at Otago Polytechnic in Dunedin, New Zealand, later becoming Head of Sculpture in 2012.

== Works ==
Beevors often explores complicated themes in her large-scale sculptural works. Psycho Killer and Friends (2004) depicts Mickey Mouse, Goofy, and Pluto armed with guns and grenades as a comment on American colonialism and foreign policy, while debbydoesdisney explores and comments on modern ideas of femininity and consumerism through large fibreglass sculptures of Disney princesses.

Her later works consist of life-sized knitted skeletons of various animals including frogs, snakes, elephants, and giraffes. The Wreck of Hope and Anatomy Lessons explore the complicated relationships between humans and the natural world, protesting their treatment and the threat of widespread extinctions. Beevors describes these works as an act of mourning for the animals depicted. The choice of medium, knitting, feeds into this concept, as Beevors says that knitting is linked to mourning as a "comforting thing" to be given.
