= Sylvia Michel =

Sylvia Michel may refer to:

- Sylvia Michel (footballer) (born 1972), German footballer
- Sylvia Michel (minister) (1935–2025), Swiss Reformed Church minister

== See also ==
- Sylvia Mitchell (born 1937), Australian long jumper
