= Paul Michel =

Paul Michel may refer to:

- Paul Michel (chess player) (1905–1977), German-Argentine chess master
- Paul Redmond Michel (born 1941), former chief judge of the United States Court of Appeals for the Federal Circuit
