= Joseph Michel =

Joseph Michel may refer to:

- Joseph Michel (composer) (1679–1736), French baroque chorister, composer and music teacher
- Joseph Michel (politician) (1925–2016), Belgian politician who was president of the Chamber of Representatives and was twice Minister of the Interior
- Joseph Eugène Michel (1821–1885), French lawyer, representative and then senator of Basses-Alpes
- Joseph Edward Michel, Ghana Army officer
