= Michał =

Michał (Polish: [ˈmixaw]) is a Polish and Sorbian form of Michael and may refer to:

- Michał Bajor (born 1957), Polish actor and musician
- Michał Chylinski (born 1986), Polish basketball player
- Michał Drzymała (1857–1937), Polish rebel
- Michał Dymek (born 1990 or 1991), Polish cinematographer
- Michał Gołaś (skier) (born 2004), Polish para-alpine skier
- Michał Heller (born 1936), Polish philosopher, academic and Catholic priest
- Michał Kalecki (1899–1970), Polish economist
- Michał Kamiński (born 1972), Polish politician
- Michał Kubiak (born 1988), Polish volleyball player
- Michał Kwiatkowski (born 1990), Polish cyclist
- Michał Kwiecień (born 1957), Polish bridge player
- Michał Listkiewicz (born 1953), Polish football referee
- Michał Lorenc (born 1955), Polish film score compose
- Michał Łysejko (born 1990), Polish heavy metal drummer
- Michał Kleofas Ogiński (1765–1833), Polish composer, diplomat, and politician
- Michał Piróg (born 1979), Polish dancer, choreographer, TV presenter, actor and television personality
- Michał Połuboczek (born 1982), Polish politician
- Michał Gedeon Radziwiłł (1778–1850), Polish noble
- Michał Rozmys (born 1995), Polish middle-distance runner
- Michał Sikorski (born 1995), Polish actor
- Michał Sołowow (born 1962), Polish billionaire businessman and rally driver
- Michał Sopoćko (1888–1975), the confessor of Faustina Kowalska and Apostle of Divine Mercy
- Michał Szpak (born 1990), Polish singer
- Michał Urbaniak (1943–2025), Polish jazz musician
- Michał Winiarski (born 1983), Polish volleyball player and coach
- Michał Korybut Wiśniowiecki (1640–1673), King of Poland
- Michał Żebrowski (born 1972), Polish actor
- Michał Żewłakow (born 1976), Polish footballer
- Michał Życzkowski (1930–2006), Polish technician
- Michał Rola-Żymierski (1890–1989), Polish communist leader and military commander

== See also ==
- Michel (disambiguation)
- Michael
