= Saint-Michel-de-Bellechasse =

- Municipality
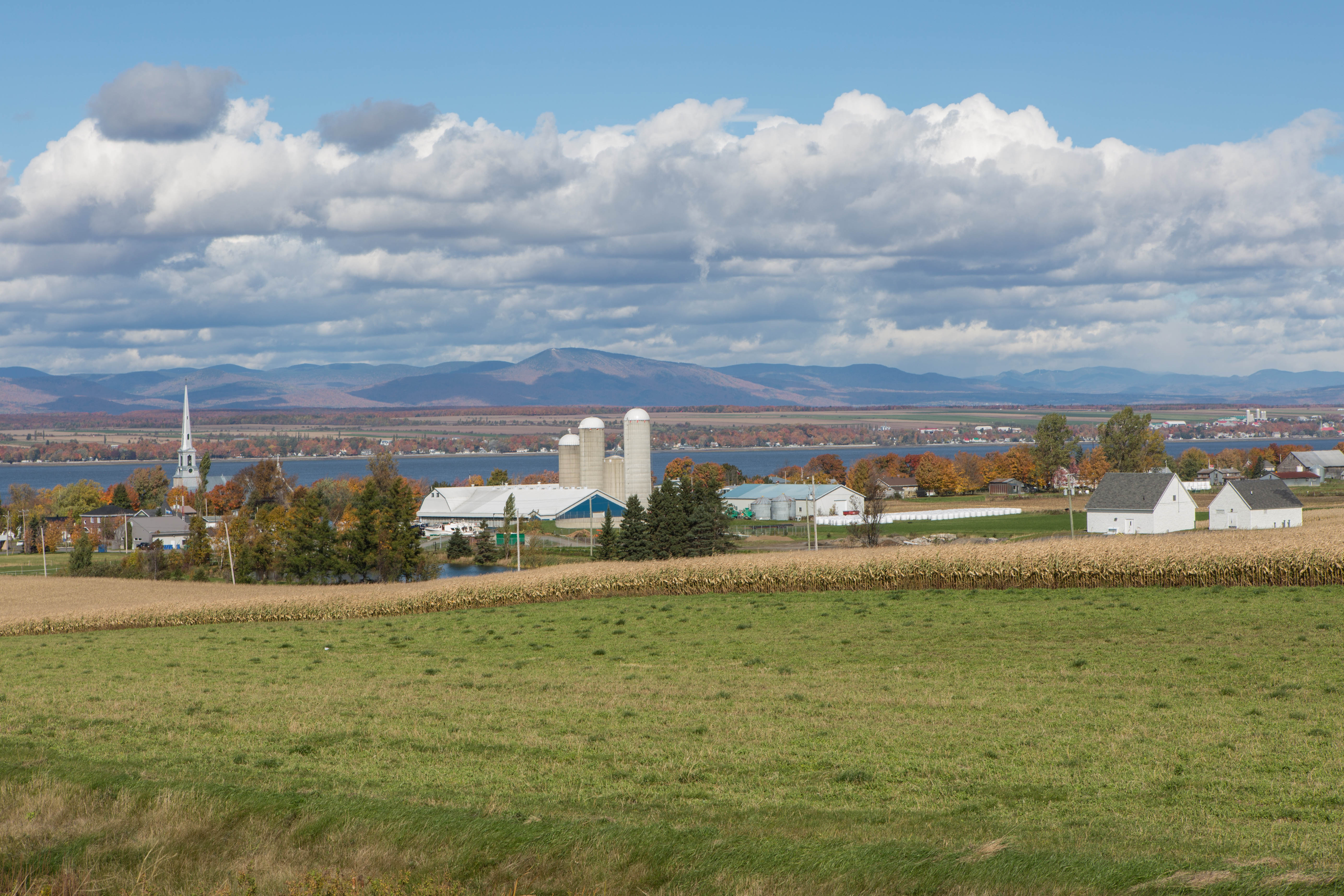
- View of Saint-Michel-de-Bellechasse

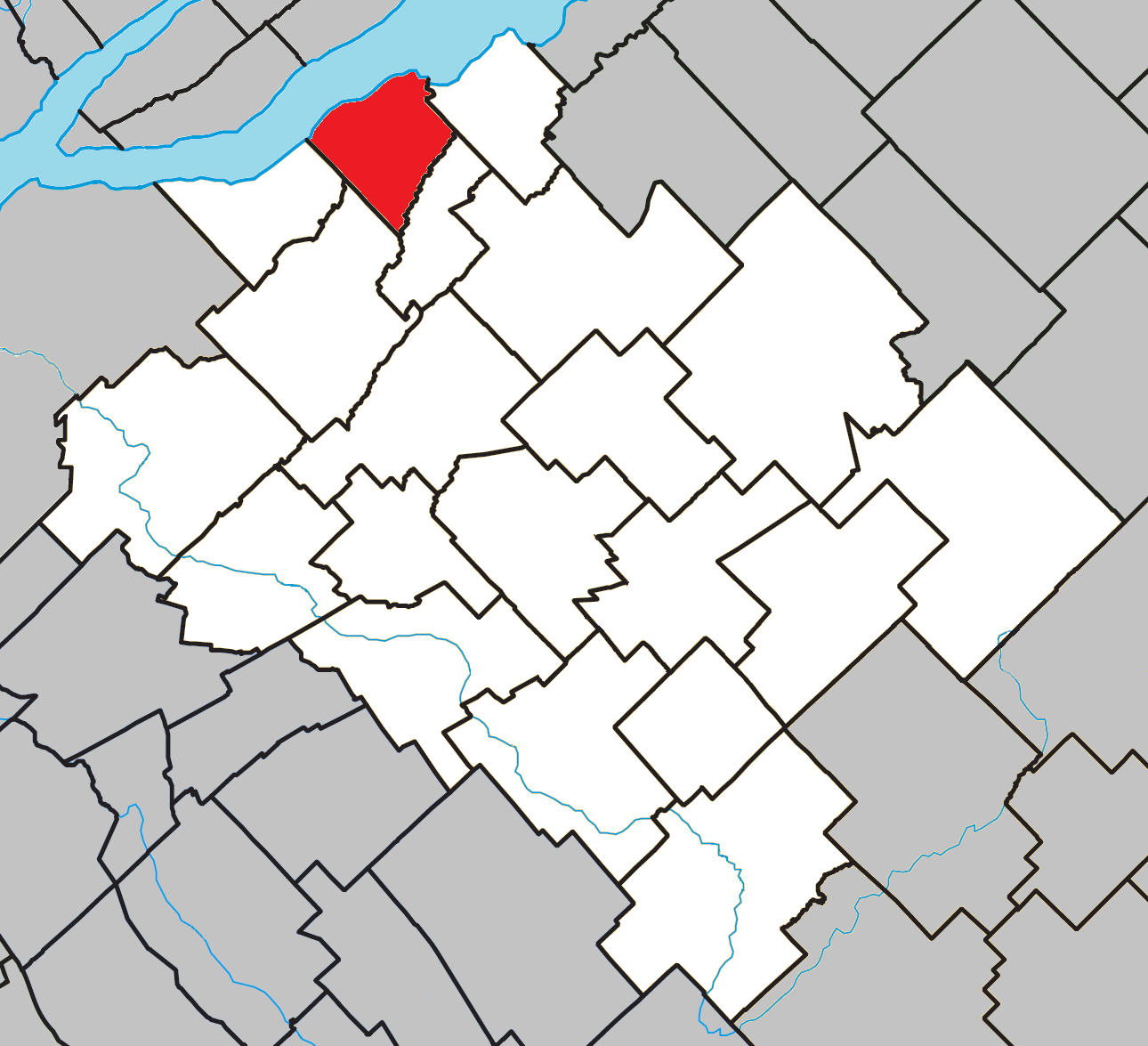
- Location within Bellechasse RCM.

- Location in province of Quebec.
- Coordinates: 46°52′N 70°55′W
- Country: Canada
- Province: Quebec
- Region: Chaudière-Appalaches
- RCM: Bellechasse
- Constituted: July 1, 1855

Government
  - Mayor: Pierre Fradette
  - Federal riding: Bellechasse—Les Etchemins—Lévis
  - Prov. riding: Bellechasse

Area
  - Total: 44.70 km^{2} (17.26 sq mi)
  - Land: 43.08 km^{2} (16.63 sq mi)

Population (2021)
  - Total: 1,871
  - Density: 43.4/km^{2} (112/sq mi)
  - Pop 2016-2021: ▲3.2%
  - Dwellings: 896
- Time zone: UTC−5 (EST)
  - Summer (DST): UTC−4 (EDT)
- Postal code(s): G0R 3S0
- Area codes: 418 and 581
- Highways A-20 (TCH): R-132; R-218; R-281
- Website: www.saintmichel debellechasse.com

Saint-Michel-de-Bellechasse (French pronunciation: [sɛ̃ miʃɛl də bɛlʃas]) is a municipality of about 1,800 people about 20 km east of Lévis, in Bellechasse Regional County Municipality in the Chaudière-Appalaches region of Quebec, Canada. It is a mostly rural community, and it was chosen as one of the Most Beautiful Villages of Quebec in Quebec. Route 281 passes through it.

== See also ==
- Raynald Leclerc
- Saint-Michel

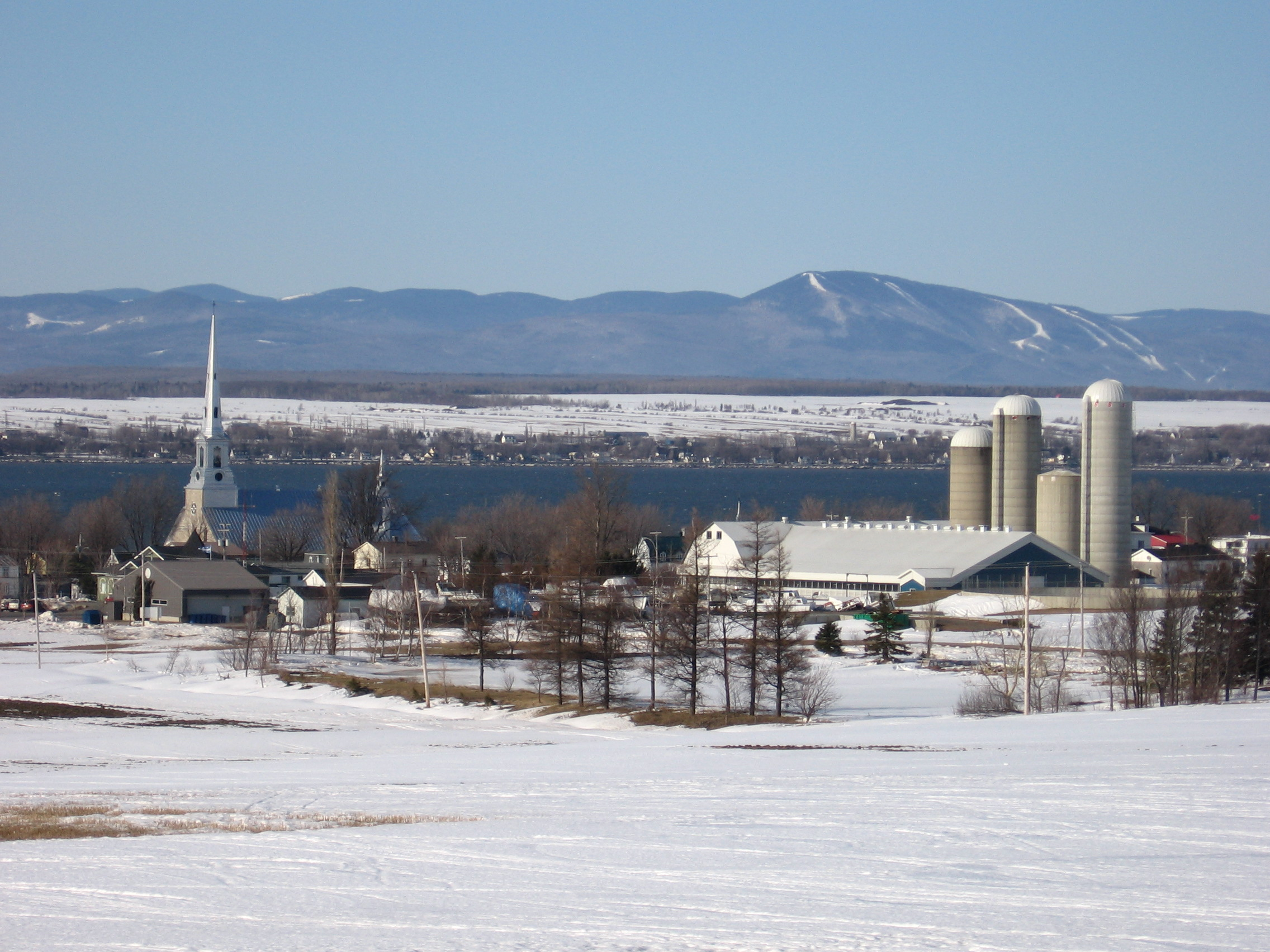
Saint-Michel-de-Bellechasse
