= Michèle Sarde =

French writer, university teacher (b. 1939)

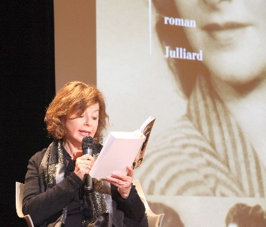
- Michèle Sarde, Paris 2016
- Education: Université Paris Sorbonne-Paris IV
- Occupations: Writer, academic
- Website: https://www.michelesarde.com

Michèle Sarde (born 1939), is a French writer (agrégée de lettres, Université Paris Sorbonne-Paris IV), born in 1939. She taught French literature and culture, together with gender and intercultural studies at Georgetown University, Washington D.C., from 1970 to 2000. She is now a Professor emerita at that university and lives in Chile and France.

Her literary work reflects her experience at the intersection between three of the world's regions, drawing inspiration from them. The key themes of her work, for which she has won several literary awards, are the observation of women, intercultural issues, the interaction between history and individual destinies and 20th century totalitarian systems, and the interweaving of personal and historical memory. She is an essayist, biographer and novelist. Her books have been translated into English, Dutch, Italian, Japanese, Russian, and Spanish.

== Essayist ==
In 1984, Sarde published a widely noted essay., titled Regard sur les Françaises, which won awards from the Académie Française and the Académie des sciences morales et politiques. It traces the singular history of Frenchwomen from the 10th to the 20th century. This study reinterprets texts, analyses the history of women in France, and presents portraits of prominent women. The essay "employs a highly concrete method, starting with an analysis of facts and texts to identify movements and continuities, and to formulate her concepts". De l'alcôve à l'arène was published in 2007, building on the analysis undertaken in Regard sur le Françaises. Based on comparative and multidisciplinary research combining literature with sociology and political science, underpinned by interviews with women who have left their mark on their epoch, Sarde surveys Frenchwomen’s journey in their quest for equality since the 1980s

Sarde has published numerous articles in academic journals.

== Biographer ==
Sarde’s biography of Colette, Colette, libre et entravée, published in 1978 (published in English with the title Colette: A Biography), was distinguished by an Académie française award. Starting out from Colette’s works, she "recreates" them in her own words. "Based on a wealth of documentation, she sheds new light on Colette as a person. Coinciding with the publication of the Pléiade edition of Colette’s works, [Sarde’s] book marks a new departure in critical approaches to Colette". Sarde then wrote a biography of Marguerite Yourcenar titled Vous Marguerite Yourcenar : la passion et ses masques, published in 1995. In this biography—written in dialogue form in which Sarde seeks to reconstitute Yourcenar’s little-known childhood and youth—she starts "from the text to deconstruct the author in terms of both her individual destiny and as a part of a collective history."

In 1995, Sarde and a team of researchers embarked on a long-term project: an edition of Marguerite Yourcenar’s correspondence (1951–1968), of which an anthology and several volumes covering the period 1951–1967 have been published already, together with a special edition devoted to Yourcenar’s letters to Emmanuel Boudot-Lamotte. With Jacques le Français published in 2002 (published in English with the title Jacques the Frenchman), she undertook a new form of biography inspired by her interviews recounting the extraordinary fate of Jacques Rossi (author of The Gulag Handbook), a young Franco-Polish communist caught up in the 1937 purges, who spent nineteen years in the Soviet Gulag.

== Novelist ==
Sarde won early attention for her first novel, Le Désir fou, which relates the journey of a destructive passion, drawing on the tormented history of the 20th century. In Histoire d'Eurydice pendant la remontée, published in 1991 (shortlisted for the prix Goncourt), she invokes the Algerian war and the Shoah. The work is organized around the myth of Orpheus and reconstructs it from the point of view of Eurydice. The novel draws its inspiration from two cultural and historical heritages: Greek mythology, revisited through the prism of feminism, and the Judeo-Christian tradition. Constance et la cinquantaine, published in 2003, is a novel in email form, with as its central theme the arrival in their fifties of a group of women bound by their friendship. In the background lurk the Armenian genocide and the military dictatorship in Chile. Sarde then turned to questions of remembrance, first with the publication, in 2016, of Revenir du silence (Returning from Silence), which tells the saga of a Sephardi family (Jews from Spain) that left Ottoman Salonica to become integrated into French life in the 1920s before suffering the persecutions of the Nazi occupation. A second perspective on this saga was published in 2019 with the title À la Recherche de Marie J. (In Search of Marie J.), interweaving two stories: the narrator’s investigations across several countries and the fictionalized quest of a young Sephardi woman from Eastern Europe lost in the Nazi camps. The third volume, published in 2023 under the title Vous doña Gracia : l’aïeule de la tribu perdue, recounts the eventful life of Gracia Naci—a historic ancestor whom the author has adopted as her own, and who devoted her immense fortune to bribing the powers that be to evade the Inquisition and help the conversos escape in the Catholic Europe of Charles V.

== Publications ==
=== Essays and biographies ===
- 1978: Colette : libre et entravée, Paris, Stock, 1978 (republished Seuil, collection Points 1984) – Prix Roland de Jouvenel from the Académie française. Published in English with the title Colette: A Biography, New York, William Morrow, 1980, and London, Michael Joseph, 1981.
- 1984: Regard sur les Françaises, X^{e}-XX^{e} siècle, Paris, Stock, 1984 (republished Seuil, collection Points, 1985) – Prix Fondation Biguet from the Académie française, Prix de l’Académie des Sciences morales et politiques, Bourse Marcelle Blum.
- 1995: Vous, Marguerite Yourcenar : la passion et ses masques, Paris, Laffont, 1995.
- 1997: Le livre de l'amitié : d'Homère à Georges Brassens, Paris, Seghers 1997 (with Arnaud Blin).
- 2002: Jacques, le Français : pour mémoire du goulag, Paris, Le Cherche Midi 2002 (republished Pocket, 2005) (with Jacques Rossi). Published in English with the title Jacques the Frenchman, Toronto, University of Toronto Press, 2020.
- 2007: De l'alcôve à l'arène : nouveau regard sur les Françaises, Paris, Laffont, 2007.

=== Correspondence edition ===
- 1995: Marguerite Yourcenar, Lettres à ses amis et quelques autres, Paris, Éditions Gallimard (with Joseph Brami)
- 2004: Marguerite Yourcenar, D’Hadrien à Zénon : Correspondance 1951–1956, Paris, Éditions Gallimard (with Joseph Brami, Maurice Delcroix, Élyane Dezon-Jones, Colette Gaudin, and Rémy Poignault)
- 2008: Marguerite Yourcenar, « Une volonté sans fléchissement » : Correspondance 1957–1960, Paris, Éditions Gallimard (with Joseph Brami, Maurice Delcroix, Colette Gaudin, and Rémy Poignault)
- 2011: Marguerite Yourcenar, « Persévérer dans l'être » : Correspondance 1961–1963, Paris, Éditions Gallimard (with Joseph Brami, Maurice Delcroix, Colette Gaudin, and Rémy Poignault)
- 2013: Marguerite Yourcenar, En 1939, l’Amérique commence à Bordeaux : Lettres à Emmanuel Boudot-Lamotte (1938–1980), Paris, Éditions Gallimard (with Élyane Dezon-Jones)
- 2019: Marguerite Yourcenar, « Le pendant des Mémoires d’Hadrien et leur entier contraire » : Correspondance 1964 1967, Paris, Éditions Gallimard (with Bruno Blanckeman, Élyane Dezon-Jones, and Rémy Poignault)

=== Novels ===
- 1975: Le désir fou, Paris, Stock, 1975.
- 1991: Histoire d'Eurydice pendant la remontée, Paris, Seuil, 1991.
- 1997: Le salon de conversation, Paris, Lattès, 1997 (with Catherine Hermary-Vieille).
- 2003: Constance et la cinquantaine, Paris, Seuil, 2003.
- 2016: Revenir du silence : Le récit de Jenny, Paris, Julliard, 2016 – Grand Prix WIZO 2017. Published in English with the title Returning from Silence, Chicago, Swan Isle Press, 2022.
- 2019: À la recherche de Marie J., Paris, Julliard, 2019.
- 2023: Vous doña Gracia : l’aïeule de la tribu perdue, Paris, Mialet Barrault, 2023

== Awards ==
- Ordre des Palmes académiques
- Ordre des Arts et des Lettres
- Ordre national du Mérite

== General references ==
- Miguet-Ollagnier, Marie. « Histoire d'Eurydice pendant la remontée de Michèle Sarde: un contre Orphée? », Uranie 2 (1992): 145–161.
- Plate, Liedeke. "Breaking the Silence: Michèle Sarde’s Histoire d'Eurydice pendant la remontée", Women in French Studies 3 (Fall 1995): 90–99.
- Proulx, Patrice J. "Of Myth and Memory: Rereading Michèle Sarde's Histoire d'Eurydice pendant la remontée", Religiologiques: Sciences Humaines et Religion 15 (Spring 1997): 179–187.
- Delcroix, Maurice. « Marguerite Yourcenar : une biographe devant ses biographes » in Cahiers de l’Association internationale des études françaises, 2000, n°52 : 201–220.
- Boloumié, Arlette. « La Résurgence du mythe d’Eurydice et ses métamorphoses dans l’œuvre d’Anouilh, de Pascal Quignard, de Henri Bosco, de Marguerite Yourcenar, de Michèle Sarde, et Jean Loup Trassard », Loxias, Loxias 2 (janv. 2004), published on line January 15, 2004.
- Nguyen, Victoria. « Histoire d’Eurydice pendant la remontée de Michèle Sarde : plasticité de la réécriture mythologique », Interartes. Diegesi migranti, a cura di Laura Brignoli, Milano, Mimesis ed., 2019, p. 71-80.
- Poignault, Rémy. « Histoire d’Eurydice pendant la remontée de Michèle Sarde : une alchimie yourcenarienne ? », Interartes. Diegesi migranti, a cura di Laura Brignoli, Milano, Mimesis ed., 2019, p. 81-95.
- Nguyen, Victoria. « Histoire d’Eurydice pendant la remontée de Michèle Sarde : histoire d’une réécriture », Mémoire de littérature française, Université Clermont Auvergne, 2019.
