= Charles Michel (disambiguation) =

Charles Michel (born 1975) is a Belgian politician and current President of the European Council.

Charles Michel may also refer to:

- Charles Michel (ophthalmologist) (1832–1913), American ophthalmologist
- Charles D. Michel (born 1963), U.S. Coast Guard vice admiral

Subjects with the first name Charles Michel or a variation thereof include:

- Charles-Michel de l'Épée
- Charles Michel de Langlade

== See also ==
- Charles Michels station, a Paris Metro station
