= Michèle Sebag =

French computer scientist

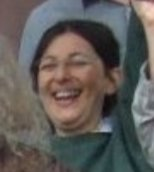

Martine-Michèle Sebag is a French computer scientist, primarily focused on machine learning. She has over 6,000 citations.

== Biography ==
Sebag studied mathematics at the Ecole Normale Supérieure, and later worked in the computer science industry, starting at Thomson Corporation, where she was introduced to artificial intelligence. She then moved into the research field, at the Laboratoire de Mécanique des Solides at Ecole Polytechnique.

She was awarded a PhD from the University of Paris-Sud, Paris Dauphine University and Ecole Polytechnique. Sebag started work at the Centre national de la recherche scientifique (CNRS) as a research fellow in 1991.

Sebag is deputy director of the Laboratoire de Recherche en Informatique at the CNRS; Head of group A-O at the latter; co-head of Projet TAO at INRIA Saclay; and principal scientist at the CNRS.

She was named chevalier of the Légion d'honneur in 2019.

== Selected research ==
- Gelly, Sylvain, et al. "The grand challenge of computer Go: Monte Carlo tree search and extensions." Communications of the ACM 55.3 (2012): 106–113.
- Bordes, Antoine, Léon Bottou, and Patrick Gallinari. "SGD-QN: Careful quasi-Newton stochastic gradient descent." Journal of Machine Learning Research 10.Jul (2009): 1737–1754.
- Termier, Alexandre, M-C. Rousset, and Michèle Sebag. "Treefinder: a first step towards xml data mining." 2002 IEEE International Conference on Data Mining, 2002. Proceedings.. IEEE, 2002.
- Sebag, Michèle, and Antoine Ducoulombier. "Extending population-based incremental learning to continuous search spaces." International Conference on Parallel Problem Solving from Nature. Springer, Berlin, Heidelberg, 1998.
