= Saint-Vallier, Quebec =

Saint-Vallier
- Municipality
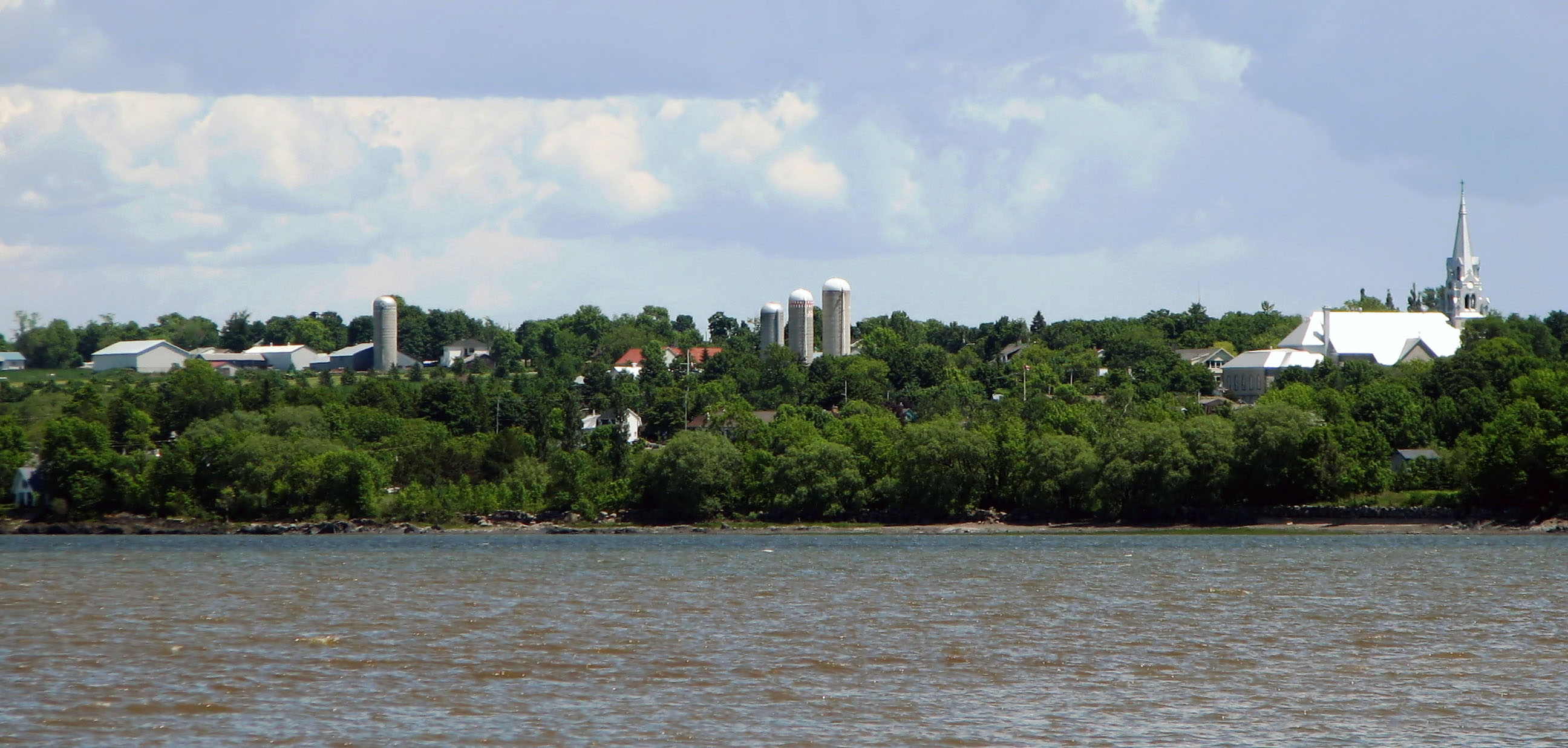
- Saint-Vallier

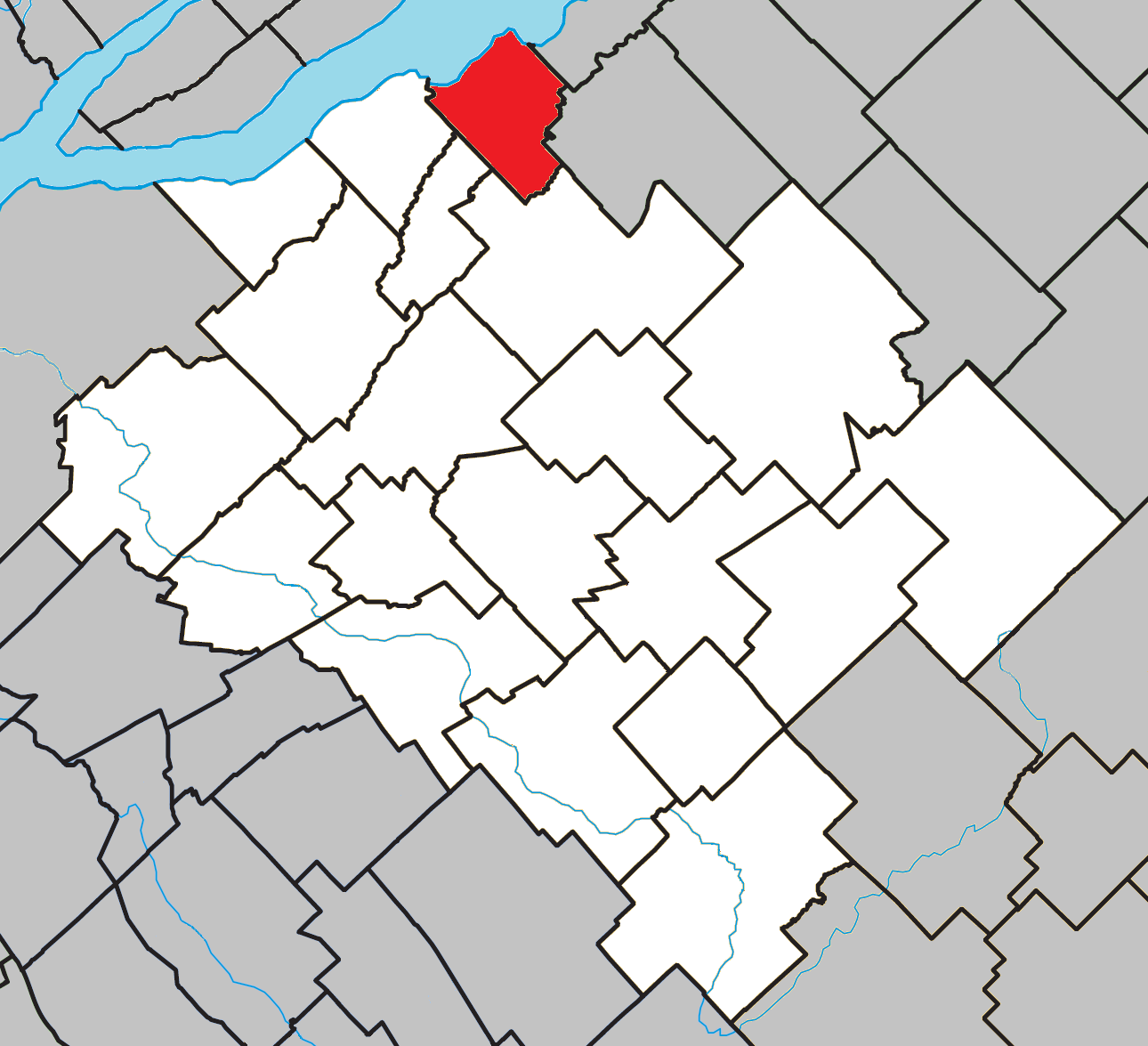
- Location within Bellechasse RCM.

- Location in province of Quebec.
- Coordinates: 46°53′N 70°49′W
- Country: Canada
- Province: Quebec
- Region: Chaudière-Appalaches
- RCM: Bellechasse
- Constituted: March 10, 1993

Government
  - Mayor: Alain Vallières
  - Federal riding: Bellechasse—Les Etchemins—Lévis
  - Prov. riding: Bellechasse

Area
  - Total: 60.50 km^{2} (23.36 sq mi)
  - Land: 44.88 km^{2} (17.33 sq mi)

Population (2021)
  - Total: 1,031
  - Density: 23/km^{2} (60/sq mi)
  - Pop 2016-2021: ▼2.8%
  - Dwellings: 519
- Time zone: UTC−5 (EST)
  - Summer (DST): UTC−4 (EDT)
- Postal code(s): G0R 4J0
- Area codes: 418 and 581
- Highways A-20 (TCH): R-132; R-228
- Website: www.stvallier bellechasse.qc.ca

Saint-Vallier (French pronunciation: [sɛ̃ valje]) is a municipality of about 1,000 people in Bellechasse Regional County Municipality in the Chaudière-Appalaches administrative region of Quebec in Canada.

== Demographics ==
Historical Census Data - Saint-Vallier, Quebec
Year	Pop.	±%
1996	1,042	—
2001	1,045	+0.3%
2006	1,044	−0.1%
2011	1,046	+0.2%
2016	1,061	+1.4%
2021	1,031	−2.8%

== Notable people ==
- Laurent Catellier (1839–1918), physician and professor
- Jack Marshall (ice hockey) (1877–1965), hockey player
- Louis-Rodolphe Roy (1858–1925), lawyer, politician and judge
