= Mount Dover =

Mountain in Antarctica

- Location within Antarctica

Highest point
- Elevation: 1,645 m (5,397 ft)
- Coordinates: 83°46′S 55°50′W

Geography
- Location: (Antarctica) Pensacola Mountains
- Parent range: Neptune Range

Mount Dover (83°46′S 55°50′W) is a mountain in Antarctica, 1,645 metres (5,397 ft) high, surmounting the southeast end of Gale Ridge where the ridge abuts the Washington Escarpment, in the Neptune Range, Pensacola Mountains.

== Exploration and name ==
Mount Dover was mapped by the United States Geological Survey (USGS) from surveys and United States Navy air photographs in 1956–66- It was named by the United States Advisory Committee on Antarctic Names for James H. Dover, a geologist with the Patuxent Range field party in 1962–63.

== Location ==
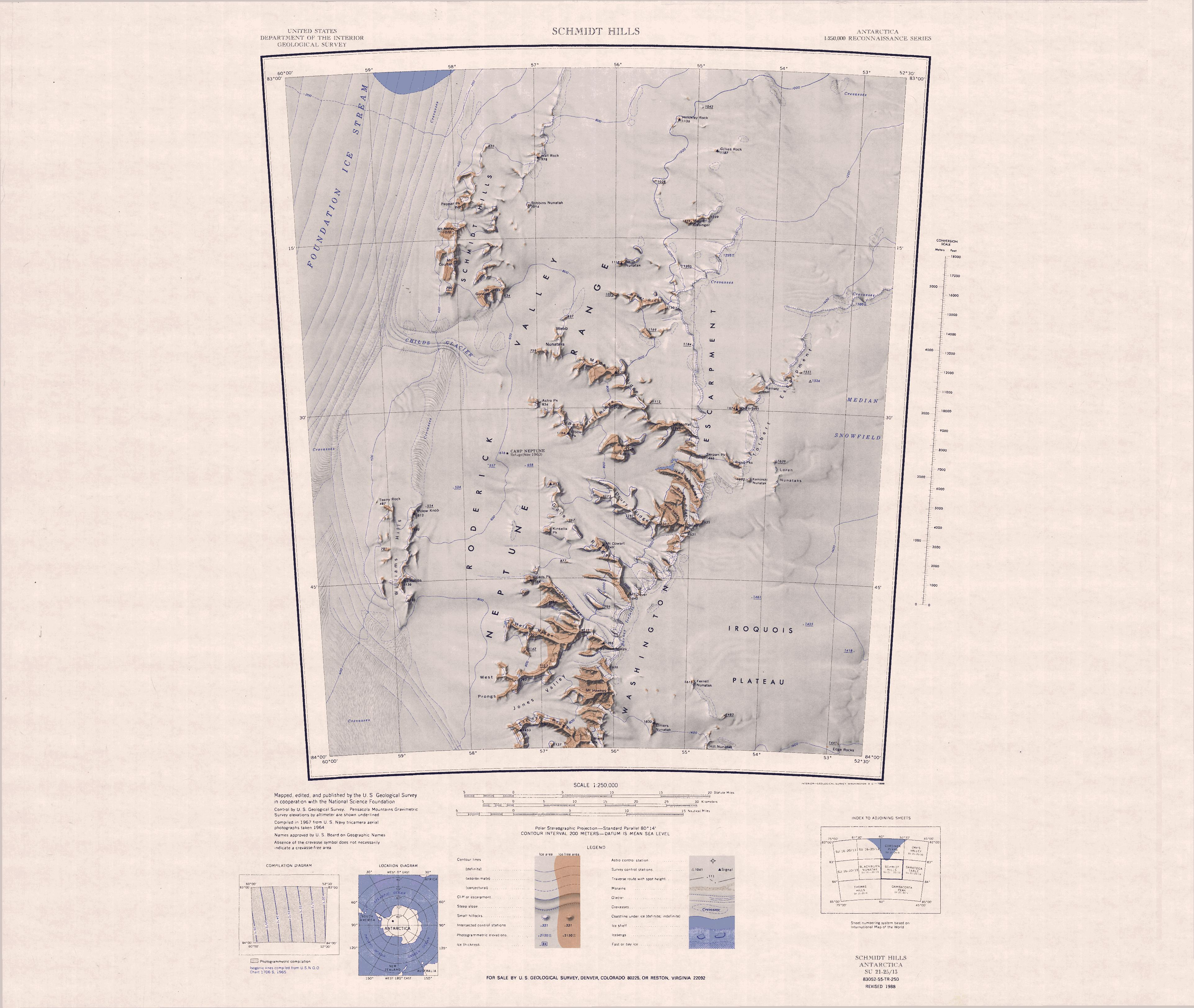
Northern part of the Neptune Range

Mount Dover is towards the south of the Washington Escarpment, west of the Iroquois Plateau and east of the Roderick Valley. It is north of Mount Hawkes, Bennett Spires and the Barnes Icefalls, and south of the Nelson Peak. The Gale Ridge extends northwest from Mount Dover, and includes Mount Cowart and Kinsella Peak.

== Nearby features ==
=== Barnes Icefalls ===
83°49′S 55°53′W. The icefalls along Washington Escarpment between Mount Dover and Bennett Spires. Mapped by USGS from surveys and United States Navy air photos, 1956-66. Named by US-ACAN for James C. Barnes, meteorologist and station scientific leader at Ellsworth Station, winter 1962.

=== Gale Ridge ===
83°41′S 56°27′W. A ridge, 12 nautical miles (22 km; 14 mi) long, extending northwestward from Mount Dover. Mapped by USGS from surveys and United States Navy air photos, 1956-66. Named by US-ACAN for Phillip L. Gale, meteorologist at Ellsworth Station, winter 1962.

=== Mount Cowart ===
83°42′S 56°09′W. A peak, 1,245 metres (4,085 ft) high, midway along Gale Ridge. Mapped by USGS from surveys and air photos, 1956-66. Named by US-ACAN for M. Sergeant Ray J. Cowart, United States Air Force, flight engineer and member of the Electronic Test Unit in the Pensacola Mountains, summer 1957-58.

=== Kinsella Peak ===
83°41′S 56°53′W. A peak along the south side of Gale Ridge, 5 nautical miles (9.3 km; 5.8 mi) west of Mount Cowart. Mapped by USGS from surveys and United States Navy air photos, 1956-66. Named by US-ACAN for William R. Kinsella, electronics technician at Ellsworth Station, winter 1958.

== Sources ==
- Alberts, Fred G., ed. (1995), Geographic Names of the Antarctic (PDF) (2 ed.), United States Board on Geographic Names This article incorporates public domain material from websites or documents of the United States Board on Geographic Names.
- Schmidt Hills, USGS: United States Geological Survey
- This article incorporates public domain material from websites or documents of the United States Geological Survey.
