= Mount Moffat =

Mountain in Antarctica

- Location within Antarctica

Highest point
- Elevation: 1,250 m (4,100 ft)
- Coordinates: 83°32′S 55°17′W

Geography
- Location: (Antarctica) Pensacola Mountains
- Parent range: Neptune Range

Mount Moffat (83°32′S 55°17′W) is a mountain, 1,250 metres (4,100 ft) high, standing 4 nautical miles (7.4 km; 4.6 mi) northeast of Mount Ege in the Neptune Range, Pensacola Mountains, Antarctica.

== Mapping and naming ==
Mount Moffat was mapped by the United States Geological Survey from surveys and United States Navy air photographs from 1956 to 1966. It was named by the United States Advisory Committee on Antarctic Names (US-ACAN) for Robert J. Moffat, a construction electrician at Ellsworth Station in the winter of 1958.

== Location ==
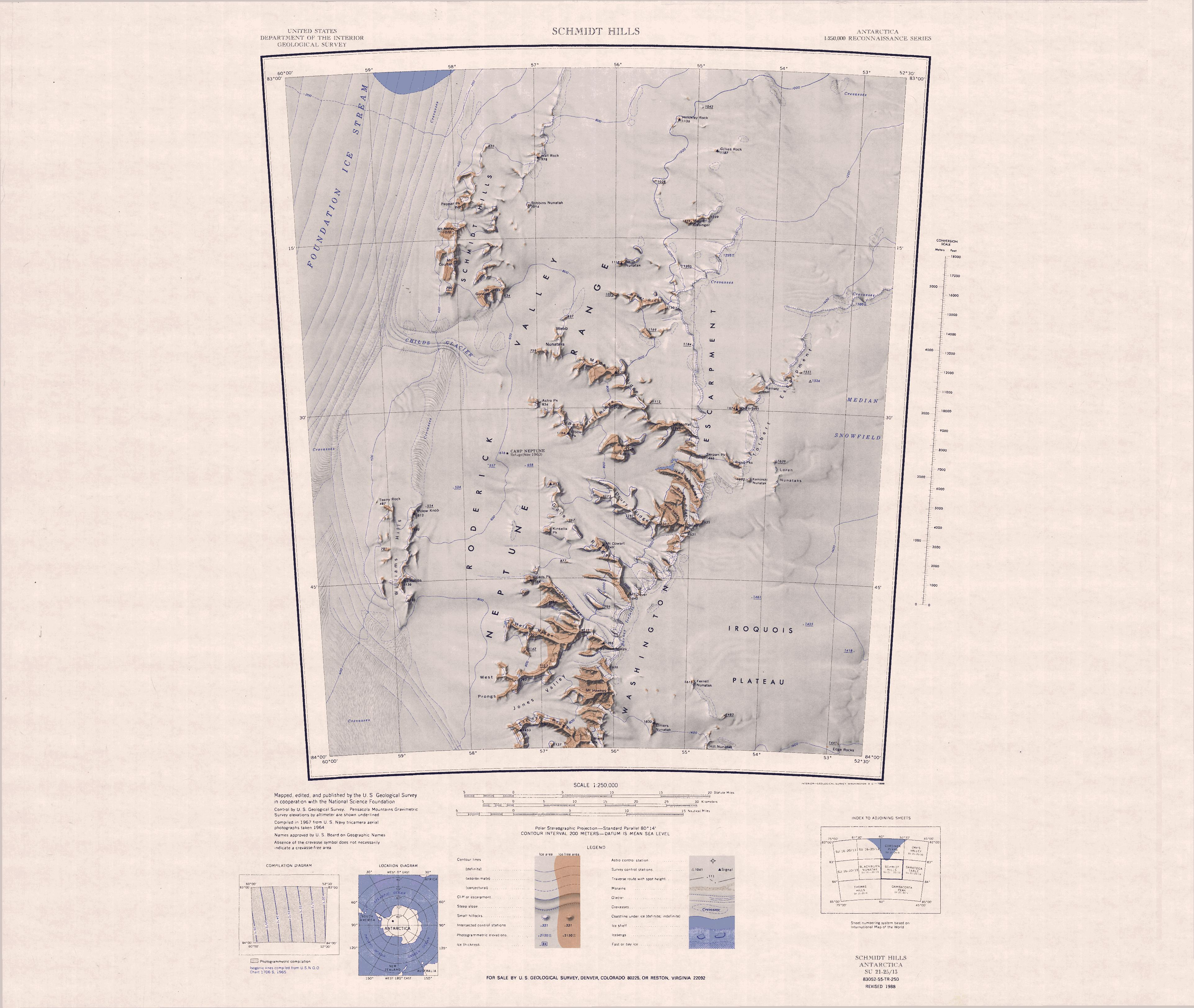
Northern part of the Neptune Range

Mount Moffat is towards the north of the Washington Escarpement, to the west of the southern part of the Torbert Escarpment and to the east of the Roderick Valley. It is just north of Serpan Peak, and east of Mount Ege. Berquist Ridge extends west from Mount Moffat past Elbow Peak, and terminates in Astro Peak. Madey Ridge extends northwest from Mount Moffat to the Webb Nunataks. Scattered features further north include Baker Ridge, Neith Nunatak, Mount Dasinger, Gillies Rock and Hinckley Rock.

== Nearby features ==
=== Serpan Peak ===
83°34′S 54°50′W. A small peak, 1,445 metres (4,741 ft) high, surmounting Washington Escarpment just west of Rivas Peaks. Mapped by USGS from surveys and United States Navy air photos, 1956-66. Named by US-ACAN for Robert D. Serpan, aerologist with the Neptune Range field party, 1963-64.

=== Mount Ege ===
83°34′S 55°53′W. Mountain, 1,350 metres (4,430 ft) high, between Berquist Ridge and Drury Ridge. Mapped by USGS from surveys and United States Navy air photos, 1956-66. Named by US-ACAN for John R. Ege, geologist with the Neptune Range field party, 1963-64.

=== Berquist Ridge ===
83°31′S 56°30′W. A curving ridge, 8 nautical miles (15 km; 9.2 mi) long, trending west from its juncture with Madey Ridge. Mapped by USGS from surveys and United States Navy air photos, 1956-66. Named by US-ACAN for Robert M. Berquist, photographer at Ellsworth Station, winter 1958.

=== Elbow Peak ===
83°32′S 56°37′W. A peak, 1,195 metres (3,921 ft) high, located at the southernmost bend of Berquist Ridge. Mapped by USGS from surveys and United States Navy air photos, 1956-66. The name given by US-ACAN describes the peak's position along the ridge.

=== Astro Peak ===
83°29′S 57°00′W. A peak, 835 metres (2,740 ft) high, standing 1 nautical mile (1.9 km; 1.2 mi) off the west end of Berquist Ridge. So named by US-ACAN because the USGS established an astro control station on this peak during the 1965-66 season.

=== Madey Ridge ===
83°28′S 55°50′W. A ridge trending northwest from Mount Moffat along the north side of Berquist Ridge. Mapped by USGS from surveys and United States Navy air photos, 1956-66. Named by US-ACAN for Jules Madey of Clark, NJ, ham radio operator who arranged innumerable phone patches between personnel in Antarctica and parties in the United States in the period 1957-67.

== Northern features ==
=== Webb Nunataks ===
83°24′S 56°42′W. A group of nunataks 2 nautical miles (3.7 km; 2.3 mi) west of Madey Ridge. Mapped by USGS from surveys and United States Navy air photos, 1956-66. Named by US-ACAN for Dalton Webb, electronics engineer with Raydist Corporation, a member of the Electronic Test Unit in the Pensacola Mountains, 1957-58.

=== Baker Ridge ===
83°20′S 55°40′W. A ridge extending west for 5 nautical miles (9.3 km; 5.8 mi) from the north part of Washington Escarpment. Mapped by USGS from surveys and United States Navy air photos, 1956-66. Named by US-ACAN for Clifford E. Baker, aviation electronics technician at Ellsworth Station, winter 1958.

=== Neith Nunatak ===
83°17′S 55°55′W. A nunatak 3 nautical miles (5.6 km; 3.5 mi) north of Baker Ridge in northern Neptune Range. Mapped by USGS from surveys and United States Navy air photos, 1956-66. Named by US-ACAN for Willard Neith, photographer with the Electronic Test Unit in the Pensacola Mountains, 1957-58.

=== Mount Dasinger ===
83°13′S 55°03′W. A mountain, 1,360 metres (4,460 ft) high, standing 6 nautical miles (11 km; 6.9 mi) northeast of Neith Nunatak. Mapped by USGS from surveys and United States Navy air photos, 1956-66. Named by US-ACAN for Lieutenant (j.g.) James R. Dasinger, United States Navy, of the Ellsworth Station winter party, 1958.

=== Gillies Rock ===
83°07′S 54°45′W. An isolated rock lying 6 nautical miles (11 km; 6.9 mi) north of Mount Dasinger. Mapped by USGS from surveys and United States Navy air photos, 1956-66. Named by US-ACAN for Betty Gillies, ham radio operator of San Diego, CA, who for several seasons from 1960-70 arranged phone patches for members of USGS field parties in the Thiel Mountains, Pensacola Mountains, and elsewhere in Antarctica.

=== Hinckley Rock ===
83°04′S 55°14′W. A rock 4 nautical miles (7.4 km; 4.6 mi) northwest of Gillies Rock. Mapped by USGS from surveys and United States Navy air photos, 1956-66. Named by US-ACAN for Neil Hinckley, a member of the Electronic Test Unit in the Pensacola Mountains, 1957-58.

=== Spanley Rocks ===
82°58′S 54°40′W. A group of about six rocks standing 10 nautical miles (19 km; 12 mi) southwest of Cordiner Peaks, marking the northern extremity of Neptune Range. Mapped by USGS from surveys and USN air photos, 1956-66. Named by US-ACAN for John A. Spanley, Jr., cook at South Pole Station, winter 1965.

== Sources ==
- Alberts, Fred G., ed. (1995), Geographic Names of the Antarctic (PDF) (2 ed.), United States Board on Geographic Names This article incorporates public domain material from websites or documents of the United States Board on Geographic Names.
- Schmidt Hills, USGS: United States Geological Survey
- This article incorporates public domain material from websites or documents of the United States Geological Survey.
