= Nelson Peak =

Mountain in Antarctica

- Location within Antarctica

Highest point
- Elevation: 1,605 m (5,266 ft)
- Coordinates: 83°40′S 55°3′W

Geography
- Location: (Antarctica) Pensacola Mountains
- Parent range: Neptune Range

Nelson Peak (83°40′S 55°3′W) is a 1,605 metres (5,266 ft) peak in Antarctica, standing at the eastern end of Drury Ridge and Brown Ridge where the two ridges abut Washington Escarpment, in the Neptune Range, Pensacola Mountains.

== Exploration and name ==
Nelson Peak was mapped by the United States Geological Survey (USGS) from surveys and United States Navy air photographs from 1956 to 1966. It was named by the United States Advisory Committee on Antarctic Names (US-ACAN) for Willis H. Nelson, a geologist with the Neptune Range field party of 1963–64.

== Location ==
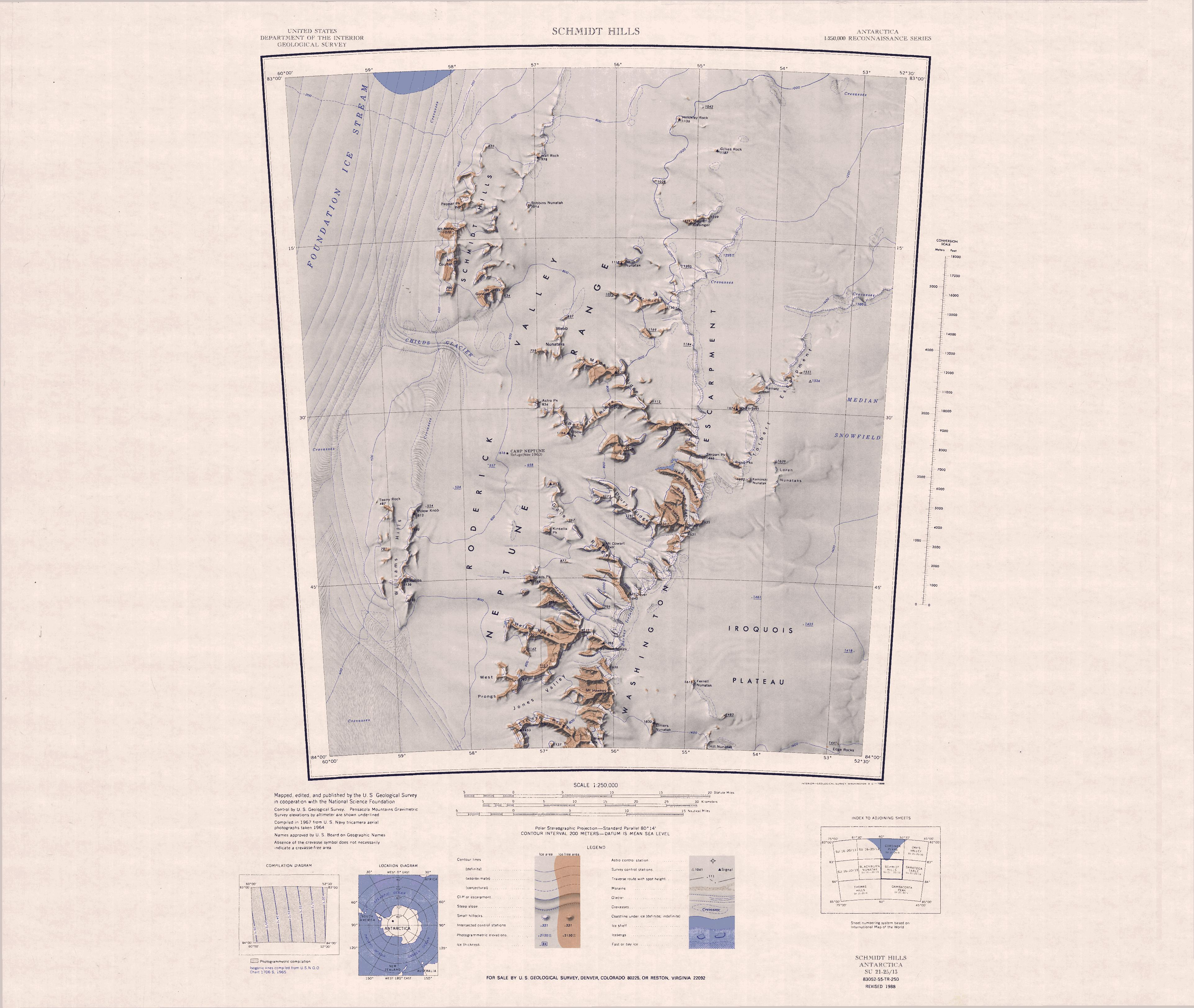
Northern part of the Neptune Range

Nelson Peak is towards the center of the Washington Escarpment, west of the Iroquois Plateau and east of the Roderick Valley. It is north of Mount Dover and south of Mount Moffat. The Drury Ridge extends west from Nelson Peak, separated by the Miller Valley from Brown Ridge, which extends north from the peak. Hannah Ridge is just north of Brown Ridge.

== Nearby features ==
=== Drury Ridge ===
83°39′S 55°45′W. A mainly snow-covered ridge, 9 nautical miles (17 km; 10 mi) long, extending west from Nelson Peak. Mapped by USGS from surveys and United States Navy air photos, 1956-66. Named by US-ACAN for David L. Drury, meteorologist at Ellsworth Station summer 1959-60, winter 1961.

=== Miller Valley ===
83°39′S 55°14′W. A small ice-free valley between Drury Ridge and Brown Ridge. Mapped by USGS from surveys and United States Navy air photos, 1956-66. Named by US-ACAN for Lieutenant Donald R. Miller, LC-47 pilot with United States Navy Squadron VX-6, who flew logistical support for the Neptune Range field party, 1963-64.

=== Brown Ridge ===
83°38′S 55°06′W. A bare rock ridge, 3 nautical miles (5.6 km; 3.5 mi) long, extending north-northwest from Nelson Peak. Mapped by USGS from surveys and United States Navy air photos, 1955-66. Named by US-ACAN for Robert D. Brown, geologist with the Patuxent Range field party, 1962-63.

=== Hannah Ridge ===
83°36′S 55°10′W. A narrow, arc-shaped rock ridge, 5 nautical miles (9.3 km; 5.8 mi) long, extending westward from Washington Escarpment just north of Brown Ridge. Mapped by USGS from surveys and United States Navy air photos, 1956-66. Named by US-ACAN for Edward L. Hannah, aviation structural mechanic at Ellsworth Station, winter 1958.

== Sources ==
- Alberts, Fred G., ed. (1995), Geographic Names of the Antarctic (PDF) (2 ed.), United States Board on Geographic Names This article incorporates public domain material from websites or documents of the United States Board on Geographic Names.
- Schmidt Hills, USGS: United States Geological Survey
- This article incorporates public domain material from websites or documents of the United States Geological Survey.
