= Cordiner Peaks =

Group of peaks in Antarctica

- Location within Antarctica

Geography
- Continent: Antarctica
- Range coordinates: 82°48′S 53°30′W
- Parent range: Pensacola Mountains

The Cordiner Peaks (82°48′S 53°30′W) are a group of peaks extending over an area of 6 nautical miles (11 km; 6.9 mi) standing 8 nautical miles (15 km; 9.2 mi) southwest of Dufek Massif in the northern part of the Pensacola Mountains, Antarctica.

== Discovery and name ==
The Cordiner Peaks were discovered and photographed on January 13, 1956, in the course of a transcontinental nonstop plane flight by personnel of United States Navy Operation Deep Freeze I from McMurdo Sound to the Weddell Sea and return. They were named by the United States Advisory Committee on Antarctic Names for Captain Douglas L. Cordiner, U.S. Navy, an observer on the P2V-2N Neptune aircraft making this flight. The entire Pensacola Mountains were mapped by the United States Geological Survey (USGS) in 1967 and 1968 from ground surveys and from United States Navy tricamera aerial photographs taken in 1964.

== Location ==
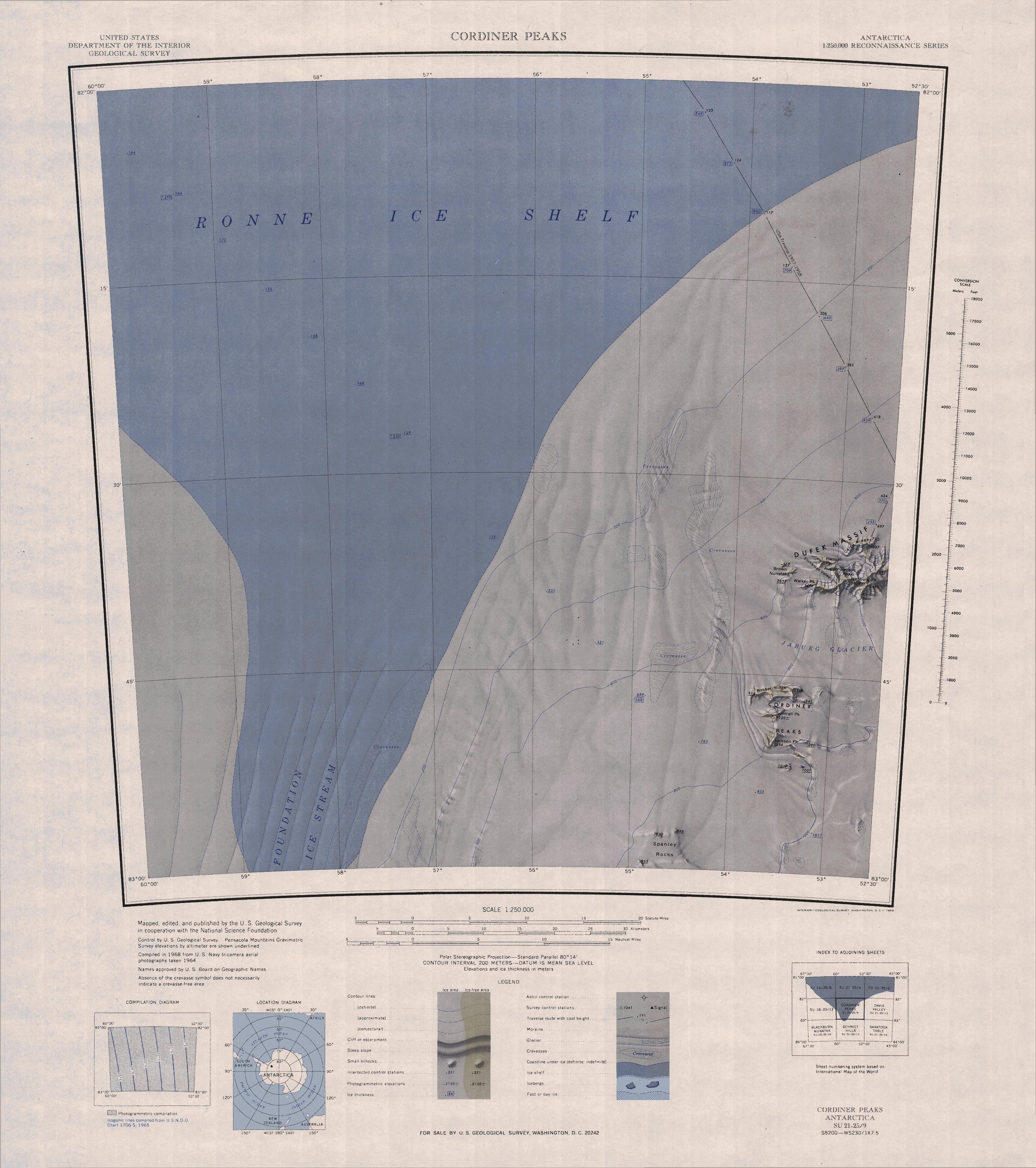
Cordiner Peaks towards southwest of map

The Cordiner Peaks are to the east of the mouth of the Foundation Ice Stream on the Ronne Ice Shelf. The Jaburg Glacier flows westward past their north side, to the south of the Dufek Massif. They are north of the Spanley Rocks at the north end of the Neptune Range. Features, from north to south, include Rosser Ridge, Sumrall Peak and Jackson Peak.

== Features ==
=== Jaburg Glacier ===
82°42′S 53°25′W. A broad glacier draining westward between Dufek Massif and Cordiner Peaks. Mapped by USGS from surveys and United States Navy air photos, 1956-66. Named by US-ACAN for Lieutenant Conrad J. Jaburg, United States Navy, helicopter pilot, Ellsworth Station winter party, 1957.

=== Rosser Ridge ===
82°46′S 53°35′W. A rock ridge, 4 nautical miles (7.4 km; 4.6 mi) long, marking the north limit of the Cordiner Peaks. Mapped by USGS from surveys and United States Navy air photos, 1956-66. Named by US-ACAN for Earl W. Rosser, topographic engineer in the Pensacola Mountains, 1965-66.

=== Sumrall Peak ===
82°48′S 53°33′W. A peak, 1,130 metres (3,710 ft) high, standing 1 nautical mile (1.9 km; 1.2 mi) south of Rosser Ridge in the Cordiner Peaks. Mapped by USGS from surveys and United States Navy air photos, 1956-66. Named by US-ACAN for Ens. William H. Sumrall, United States Navy Reserve, airplane pilot, Ellsworth Station winter party, 1957.

=== Jackson Peak ===
82°50′S 53°35′W. A peak, 1,255 metres (4,117 ft) high, standing 2 nautical miles (3.7 km; 2.3 mi) south of Sumrall Peak. Mapped by USGS from surveys and United States Navy air photos, 1956-66. Named by US-ACAN for Allen M. Jackson, aviation electronics technician, Ellsworth Station winter party, 1957.

== Sources ==
- Alberts, Fred G., ed. (1995), Geographic Names of the Antarctic (PDF) (2 ed.), United States Board on Geographic Names This article incorporates public domain material from websites or documents of the United States Board on Geographic Names.
- Cordiner Peaks, USGS: United States Geological Survey
- This article incorporates public domain material from websites or documents of the United States Geological Survey.
