= Mount Hawkes =

Mountain in Antarctica

- Location within Antarctica

Highest point
- Elevation: 1,975 m (6,480 ft)
- Coordinates: 83°55′S 56°5′W

Geography
- Location: Pensacola Mountains, Antarctica
- Parent range: Neptune Range

Mount Hawkes (83°55′S 56°5′W) is, at 1,975 metres (6,480 ft), the highest mountain along the Washington Escarpment, standing at the east side of Jones Valley in the Neptune Range of the Pensacola Mountains, Antarctica.

== Discovery and name ==
Mount Hawkes was discovered and photographed on January 13, 1956, in the course of the trans-Antarctic nonstop plane flight by personnel of United States Navy Operation Deep Freeze I from McMurdo Sound to the Weddell Sea and return. It was named by the United States Advisory Committee on Antarctic Names for Commander William M. Hawkes of the United States Navy, who was the co-pilot of the P2V-2N Neptune aircraft making this flight. The Hawkes Heights are also named for Hawkes, who was assigned to Air Development Squadron Six (VX-6) in 1955–56.

== Location ==
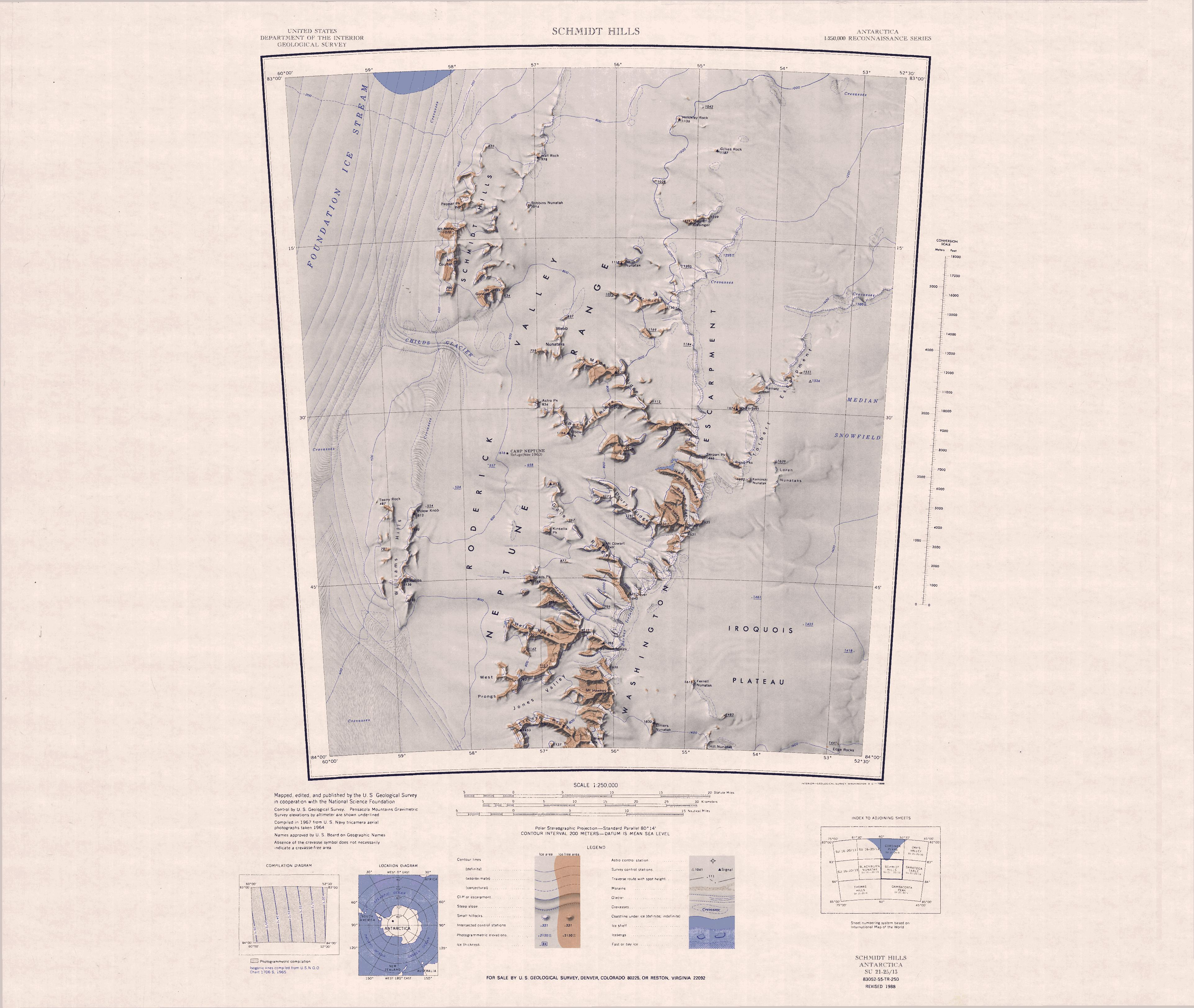
Northern part of the Neptune Range

Mount Hawkes is towards the south of the Washington Escarpment, which runs from south to north through the length of the Neptune Range. The Jones Valley is to its west and the Iroquois Plateau is to its east. Gambacorta Peak is to the south and Bennett Spires is to the north. Ridges extending west from Bennett Spires include the West Prongs, Heiser Ridge and Hudson Ridge, which terminates in Meads Peak.

== Nearby features ==
=== Jones Valley ===
83°55′S 56°50′W. A snow-covered valley between West Prongs and Elliott Ridge. Mapped by USGS from surveys and United States Navy air photos, 1956–66. Named by US-ACAN for Lieutenant (j.g.) James G.L. Jones, United States Navy, a member of the Ellsworth Station winter party in 1958.

=== Bennett Spires ===
83°51′S 56°10′W. Two sharp peaks overlooking the head of Jones Valley. Mapped by USGS from surveys and United States Navy air photos, 1956–66. Named by US-ACAN for Staff Sergeant Robert E. Bennett, United States Air Force, radio operator of the Electronic Test Unit in the Pensacola Mountains, summer 1957–58.

=== West Prongs ===
83°54′S 57°34′W. Three distinctive rock spurs that form the west end of the ridge just north of Elliott Ridge. Mapped by USGS from surveys and United States Navy air photos, 1956–66. Named by US-ACAN for Clyde E. West, cook at Ellsworth Station, winter 1958.

=== Seely Ridge ===
83.8833333°S 56.9166667°W. A ridge, 10 kilometres (6.2 mi) long, rising to 1,240 metres (4,070 ft) at the south end, trends northeast from West Prongs to join Heiser Ridge. Named by US-ACAN in 1995 after Benjamin W. Seely, who invented the inflatable life raft in 1915 at Pensacola Naval Air Station.

=== Heiser Ridge ===
83°50′S 57°09′W. A narrow rock ridge, 5 nautical miles (9.3 km; 5.8 mi) long, midway between West Prongs and Hudson Ridge. Mapped by USGS from surveys and United States Navy air photos, 1956–66. Named by US-ACAN for James R. Heiser, topographic engineer with the Neptune Range field party, summer 1963–64.

=== Hudson Ridge ===
83°47′S 56°39′W. A narrow rock ridge 5 nautical miles (9.3 km; 5.8 mi) long, lying 4 nautical miles (7.4 km; 4.6 mi) north of Heiser Ridge. Mapped by USGS from surveys and United States Navy air photos, 1956–66. Named by US-ACAN for Peter M. Hudson, aviation machinist at Ellsworth Station, winter 1958.

=== Meads Peak ===
83°45′S 57°08′W. A peak, 1,165 metres (3,822 ft) high, standing 0.5 nautical miles (0.93 km; 0.58 mi) off the northwest end of Hudson Ridge. Mapped by USGS from surveys and United States Navy air photos, 1956–66. Named by US-ACAN for Edward C. Meads, construction driver at Ellsworth Station, winter 1958.

== Sources ==
- Alberts, Fred G., ed. (1995), Geographic Names of the Antarctic (PDF) (2 ed.), United States Board on Geographic Names This article incorporates public domain material from websites or documents of the United States Board on Geographic Names.
- Schmidt Hills, USGS: United States Geological Survey
- "Seely Ridge", Geographic Names Information System, United States Geological Survey, United States Department of the Interior
- This article incorporates public domain material from websites or documents of the United States Geological Survey.
