= Gambacorta Peak =

Peak in the Pensacola Mountains, Antarctica

- Location within Antarctica

Highest point
- Elevation: 1,840 m (6,040 ft)
- Coordinates: 84°2′S 56°3′W

Geography
- Location: (Antarctica) Pensacola Mountains
- Parent range: Neptune Range

Gambacorta Peak (84°2′S 56°3′W) is a peak 1,840 metres (6,040 ft) high, standing 4 nautical miles (7.4 km; 4.6 mi) east of Mount Kaschak in the southern Neptune Range, Pensacola Mountains, Antarctica.

== Mapping and name ==
Gambacorta Peak was mapped by the United States Geological Survey from surveys and United States Navy air photographs from 1956 to 1966. It was named by the United States Advisory Committee on Antarctic Names for Captain Francis M. Gambacorta, captain of the USS Wyandot that transported the party which established Ellsworth Station at the outset of the International Geophysical Year. Unloading at the station site on the Filchner Ice Shelf began January 29, 1957.

== Location ==
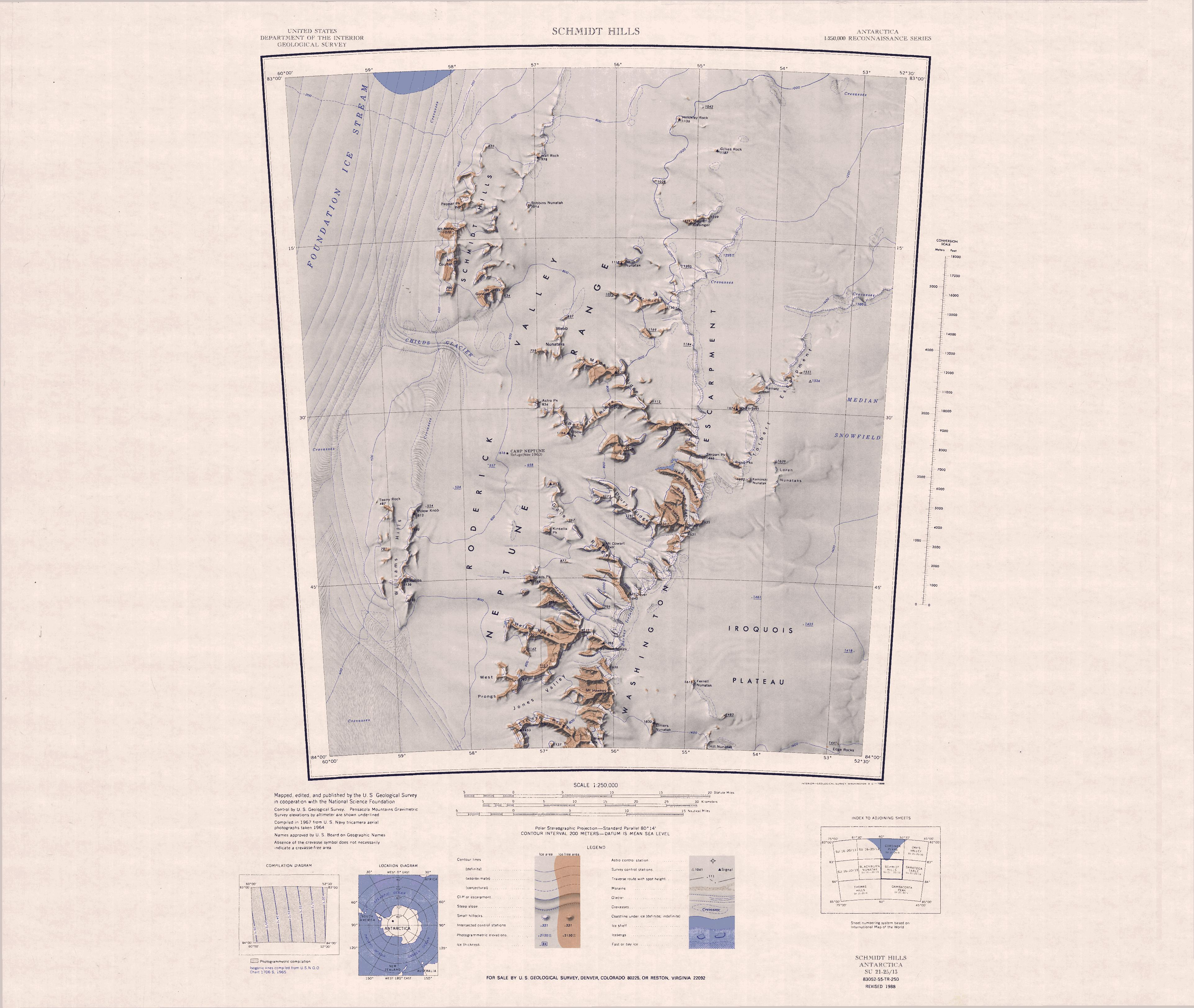
Northern part of the Neptune Range

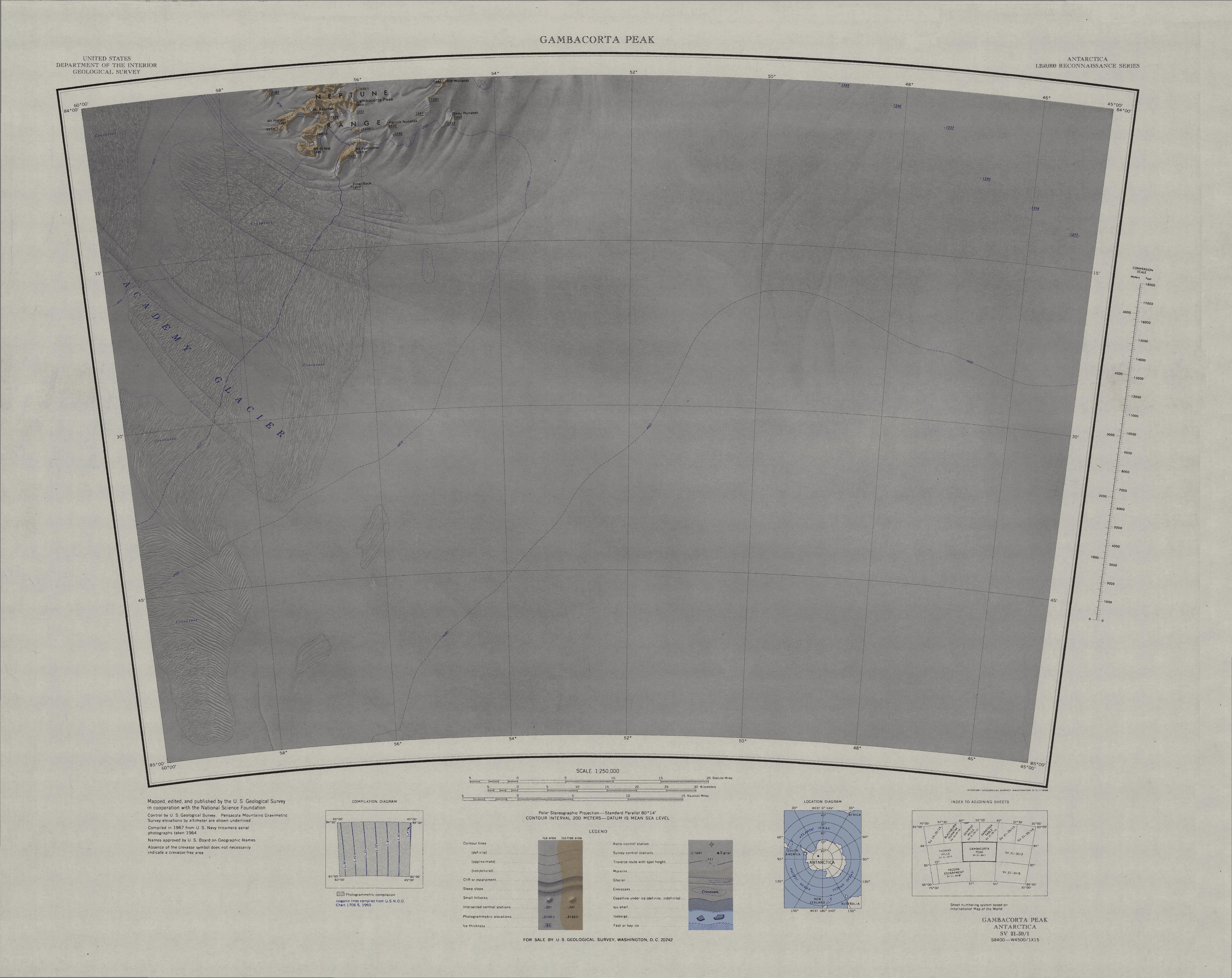
Gambacorta Peak in southern tip of range in northwest of map

Gambacorta Peak is a high point in the southern end of the Washington Escarpment, which runs from south to north through the Neptune Range. It is northeast of the Academy Glacier. The Antarctic Plateau is to the east. Nearby features include Mount Harper, Mount Kashak and Mount Bragg to the southwest, Mount Feldkotter to the south, and Patrick Nunatak, Seay Nunatak and Hill Nunatak to the east. Wiens Peak and Elliott Ridge are to the north.

== Nearby features ==
The nearby features were mapped by USGS from surveys and United States Navy air photos, 1956-66.

=== Mount Harper ===
84°03′S 57°03′W. A peak, 1,405 metres (4,610 ft) high, standing 2 nautical miles (3.7 km; 2.3 mi) west of Mount Kaschak. Named by US-ACAN for Ronald B. Harper, electronics technician at Ellsworth Station, winter 1958.

=== Mount Kaschak ===
84°02′S 56°40′W. A peak, 1,580 metres (5,180 ft) high, standing 4 nautical miles (7.4 km; 4.6 mi) west of Gambacorta Peak in southern Neptune Range. Named by US-ACAN for John P. Kaschak, aviation machinist at Ellsworth Station, winter 1958.

=== Mount Bragg ===
84°06′S 56°43′W. A mountain, 1,480 metres (4,860 ft) high, standing 6 nautical miles (11 km; 6.9 mi) southwest of Gambacorta Peak. Named by US-ACAN for Ralph L. Bragg, photographer with United States Navy Squadron VX-6 at McMurdo Station in 1964.

=== Mount Feldkotter ===
84°06′S 56°06′W. A mountain, 1,510 metres (4,950 ft) high, standing 4 nautical miles (7.4 km; 4.6 mi) south of Gambacorta Peak. Named by US-ACAN for Henry H.J. Feldkotter, aviation electrician at Ellsworth Station, winter 1958.

=== Final Rock ===
84°09′S 56°10′W. An isolated rock standing 3 nautical miles (5.6 km; 3.5 mi) south of Mount Feldkotter at the south extremity of the Neptune Range. So named by US-ACAN because it is the southernmost rock of the Neptune Range.

=== Patrick Nunatak ===
84°04′S 55°35′W. A nunatak 3.5 nautical miles (6.5 km; 4.0 mi) southeast of Gambacorta Peak. Named by US-ACAN for Frank M. Patrick, aerographer at Ellsworth Station, winter 1958.

=== Seay Nunatak ===
84°03′S 54°38′W. A nunatak standing 3 nautical miles (5.6 km; 3.5 mi) south of Hill Nunatak. Named by US-ACAN for William K. Seay, utilities man at Ellsworth Station, winter 1958.

=== Wiens Peak ===
83°59′S 56°19′W. A peak at the east end of Elliott Ridge in southern Neptune Range,. Named by US-ACAN for Rudolph H. Wiens, aurora scientist at Ellsworth Station, winter 1962.

=== Elliott Ridge ===
83°57′S 57°00′W. A hook-shaped ridge, 8 nautical miles (15 km; 9.2 mi) long, extending westward from Wiens Peak. Named by US-ACAN for Commander James Elliott, captain of the icebreaker USS Stalten Island which assisted the cargo ship Wyandot through the Weddell Sea pack ice to establish Ellsworth Station on the Filchner Ice Shelf in January 1957.

== Sources ==
- Alberts, Fred G., ed. (1995), Geographic Names of the Antarctic (PDF) (2 ed.), United States Board on Geographic Names This article incorporates public domain material from websites or documents of the United States Board on Geographic Names.
- Gambacorta Peak, USGS: United States Geological Survey
- Schmidt Hills, USGS: United States Geological Survey
- This article incorporates public domain material from websites or documents of the United States Geological Survey.
