= Pecora Escarpment =

Formation in Antarctica

- Location within Antarctica

Geography
- Continent: Antarctica
- Range coordinates: 85°38′S 68°42′W
- Parent range: Pensacola Mountains

The Pecora Escarpment (85°38′S 68°42′W) is an irregular escarpment, 7 nautical miles (13 km; 8.1 mi) long, standing 35 nautical miles (65 km; 40 mi) southwest of Patuxent Range and marking the southernmost exposed rocks of the Pensacola Mountains.

== Exploration and name ==
The Pecora Escarpment was mapped by United States Geological Survey (USGS) from surveys and United States Navy air photos in 1956–66. It was named by Dwight Schmidt, geologist to the Pensacola Mountains, 1962–66, for William Thomas Pecora, eighth director of the United States Geological Survey, 1965–71.

== Location ==
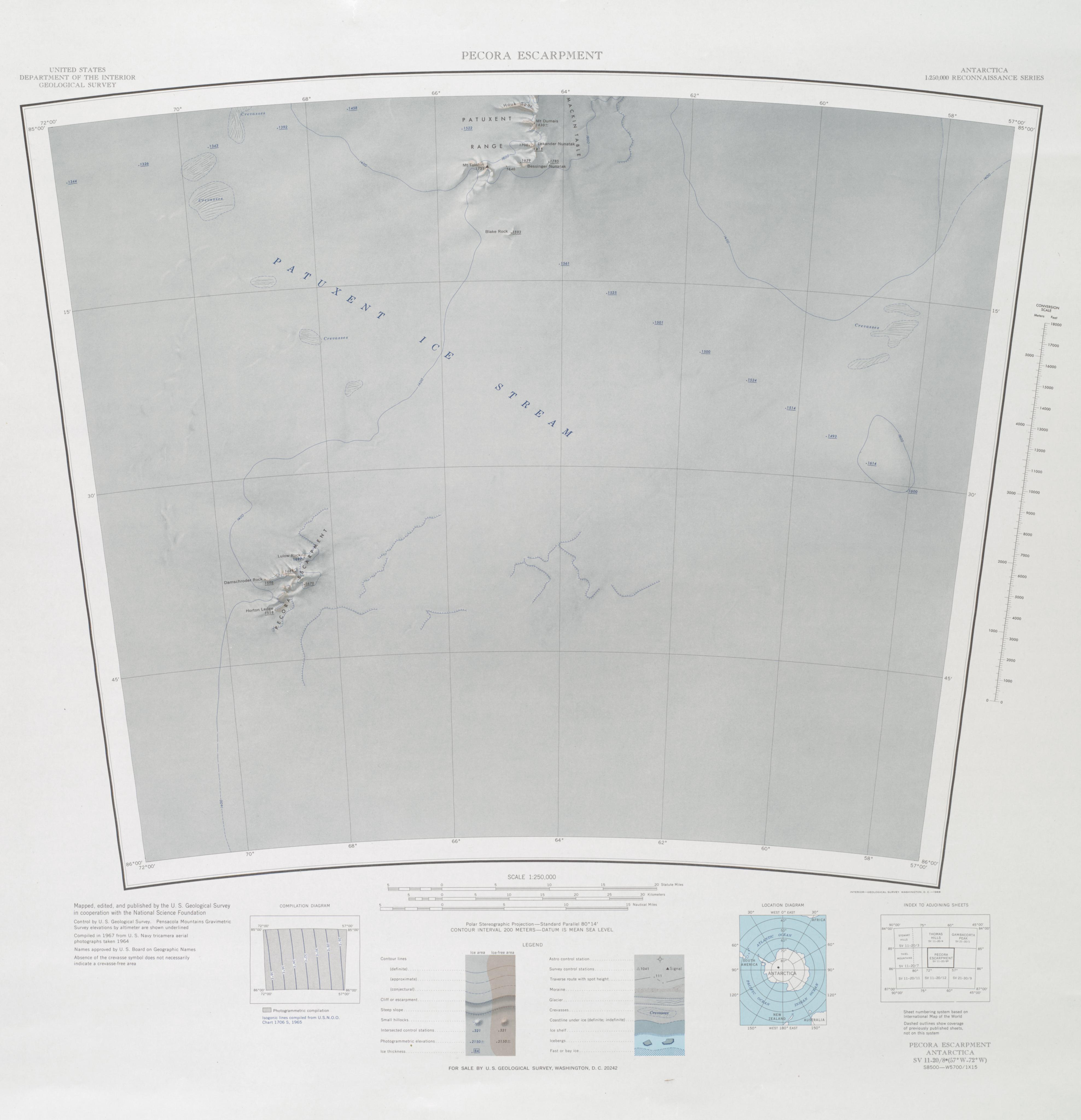
Pecora Escarpment towards southwest of map

The Pecora Escarpment is an isolated at the southwest end of the Pensacola Mountains. It is south of the Patuxent Ice Stream. The Patuxent Range is to the north of the ice stream. Features, from southwest to northeast, are Horton Ledge, Damschroder Rock and Lulow Rock.

== Features ==
=== Horton Ledge ===
85°41′S 69°05′W. A flat rock ledge that caps the southwest extremity of Pecora Escarpment. Mapped by USGS from surveys and United States Navy air photos, 1956-66. Named by the United States Advisory Committee on Antarctic Names (US-ACAN) for Edward C. Horton, Jr., electronics technician at Plateau Station, winter 1966.

=== Damschroder Rock ===
85°38′S 69°14′W. A conspicuous rock outlier, 1,595 metres (5,233 ft) high, at the end of a snow-covered spur extending westward for 2.5 nautical miles (4.6 km; 2.9 mi) from central Pecora Escarpment. Mapped by USGS from surveys and United States Navy air photos, 1956-66. Named by US-ACAN for Gerald H. Damschroder, construction mechanic at Plateau Station, winter 1966.

=== Lulow Rock ===
85°36′S 68°30′W. A prominent rock, 1,695 metres (5,561 ft) high, which is the northernmost exposed rock along the face of the Pecora Escarpment. Mapped by USGS from surveys and United States Navy air photos, 1956-66. Named by US-ACAN for William F. Lulow, cook at Plateau Station, winter 1966.

== Sources ==
- Alberts, Fred G., ed. (1995), Geographic Names of the Antarctic (PDF) (2 ed.), United States Board on Geographic Names This article incorporates public domain material from websites or documents of the United States Board on Geographic Names.
- Pecora Escarpment, USGS: United States Geological Survey
- This article incorporates public domain material from websites or documents of the United States Geological Survey.
