= Williams Hills =

Hills in Antarctica

- Location within Antarctica

Geography
- Range coordinates: 83°42′S 58°55′W
- Parent range: Neptune Range

Williams Hills (83°42′S 58°55′W) is a compact group of hills, 10 nautical miles (19 km; 12 mi) long, located south of Childs Glacier and west of Roderick Valley in the Neptune Range, Pensacola Mountains, Antarctica.

== Mapping and name ==
The Williams Hills were mapped by the United States Geological Survey (USGS) from surveys and United States Navy air photographs in 1956–1966. They were named by the United States Advisory Committee on Antarctic Names (US-ACAN) for Paul L. Williams, USGS geologist with the Neptune Range field party in 1963–64.

== Location ==
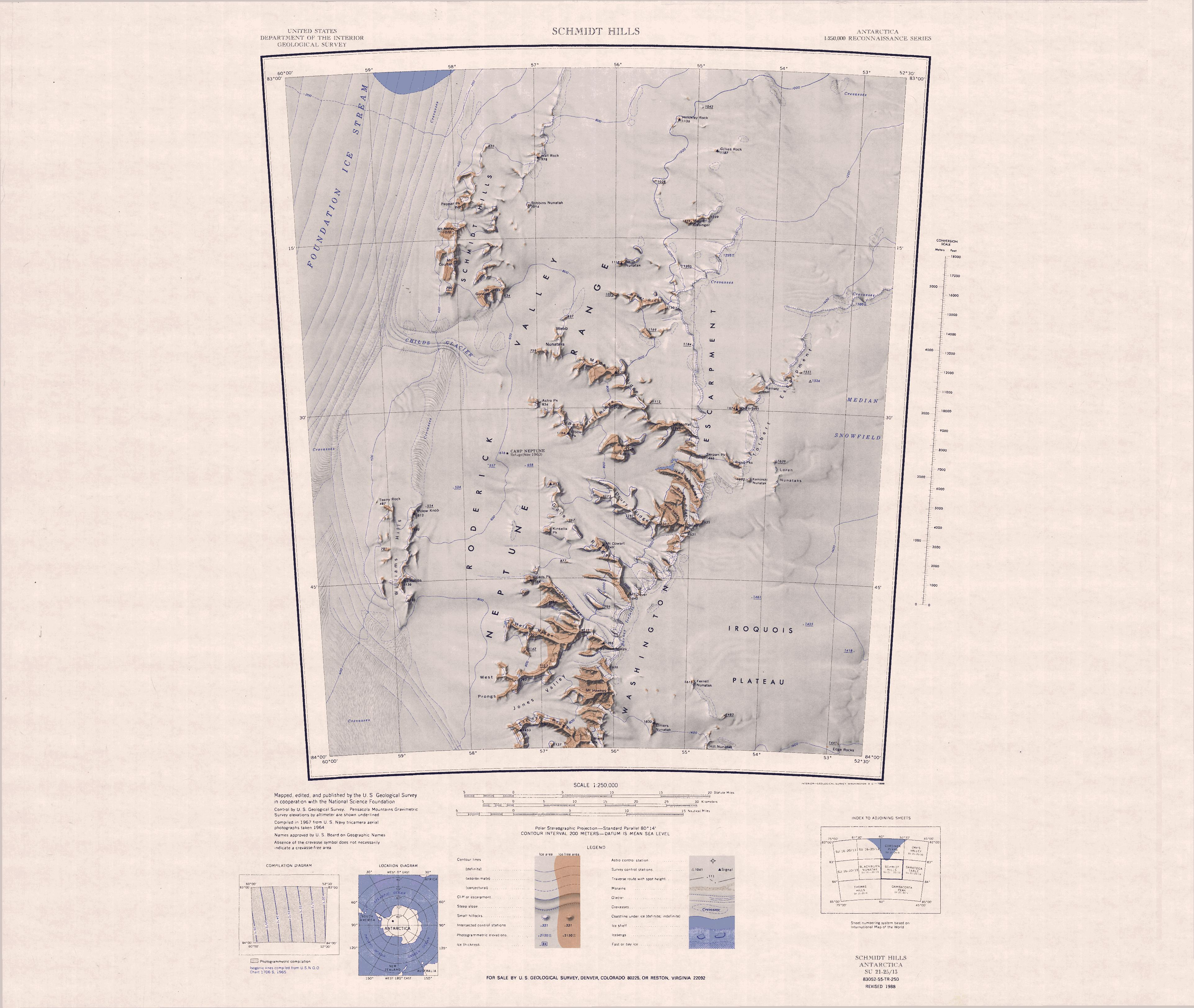
Williams Hills in the southwest

The Williams Hills are in the southwest of the Neptune Range on the east side of the Foundation Ice Stream. They are south of the Schmidt Hills and west of the southern end of the Washington Escarpment, from which they are separated by the Roderick Valley. Named features include, from south to north, Mount Hobbs, Pillow Knob and Teeny Rock.

== Features ==
=== Mount Hobbs ===
83°45′S 58°50′W. A mountain, 1,135 metres (3,724 ft) high, the highest summit of Williams Hills. Named by US-ACAN for Ens. James W. Hobbs, United States Navy, of the Ellsworth Station winter party, 1958.

=== Pillow Knob ===
83°39′S 58°41′W. A peak, 810 metres (2,660 ft) high, protruding through the snow cover at the northeast end of Williams Hills. The descriptive name was suggested by Dwight L. Schmidt, USGS geologist to these mountains, 1962–1966.

=== Teeny Rock ===
83°38′S 59°10′W. A small rock at the northwest end of Williams Hills. The name by US-ACAN alludes to the small size of the feature.

== Sources ==
- Alberts, Fred G., ed. (1995), Geographic Names of the Antarctic (PDF) (2 ed.), United States Board on Geographic Names This article incorporates public domain material from websites or documents of the United States Board on Geographic Names.
- Schmidt Hills, USGS: United States Geological Survey
- This article incorporates public domain material from websites or documents of the United States Geological Survey.
