= Francis Gambacorta =

Francis Michael Gambacorta (8 July 1913 - 1 December 2000) was a US Navy Captain. He graduated from the U.S. Naval Academy at Annapolis, Class of 1935 and served onboard submarines in World War II, receiving the Silver Star award for actions in Japan in 1942.

Later, Gambacorta served as captain of the USS Wyandot that transported the party which established Ellsworth Station, an Antarctic research station, at the outset of the International Geophysical Year. Unloading at the station site on the Filchner Ice Shelf began in January 1957. Gambacorta Peak, a mountain near the Station, was named for him by the Advisory Committee on Antarctic Names (US-ACAN).
