= Neptune Range =

Mountain range in Antarctica

- Location within Antarctica

Highest point
- Elevation: 1,975 m (6,480 ft)

Geography
- Range coordinates: 83°30′S 056°00′W
- Parent range: Pensacola Mountains

The Neptune Range (83°30′S 056°00′W) is a mountain range, 70 nautical miles (130 km; 81 mi) long, lying west-southwest of Forrestal Range in the central part of the Pensacola Mountains, Antarctica. The range comprises Washington Escarpment with its associated ridges, valleys and peaks, the Iroquois Plateau, the Schmidt and the Williams Hills.

== Exploration and name ==
The Neptune Range was discovered and photographed on 13 January 1956 on a United States Navy transcontinental plane flight from McMurdo Sound to Weddell Sea and return. It was named by United States US-ACAN after the Navy P2V-2N "Neptune" aircraft with which this flight was made. The entire Pensacola Mountains were mapped by United States Geological Survey (USGS) in 1967 and 1968 from ground surveys and United States Navy tricamera aerial photographs taken in 1964.

== Location ==
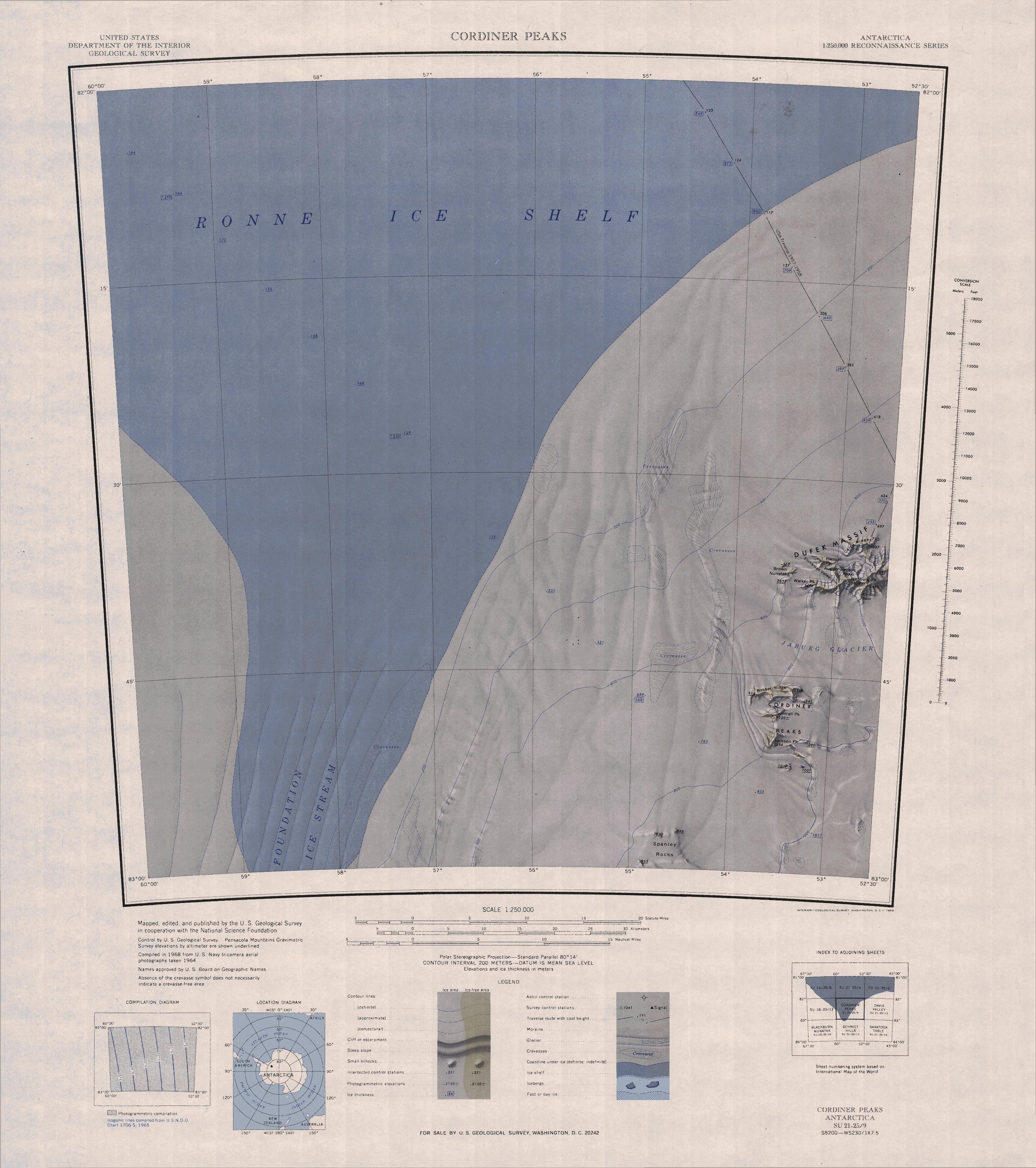
Spanley Rocks in extreme north, south margin of map

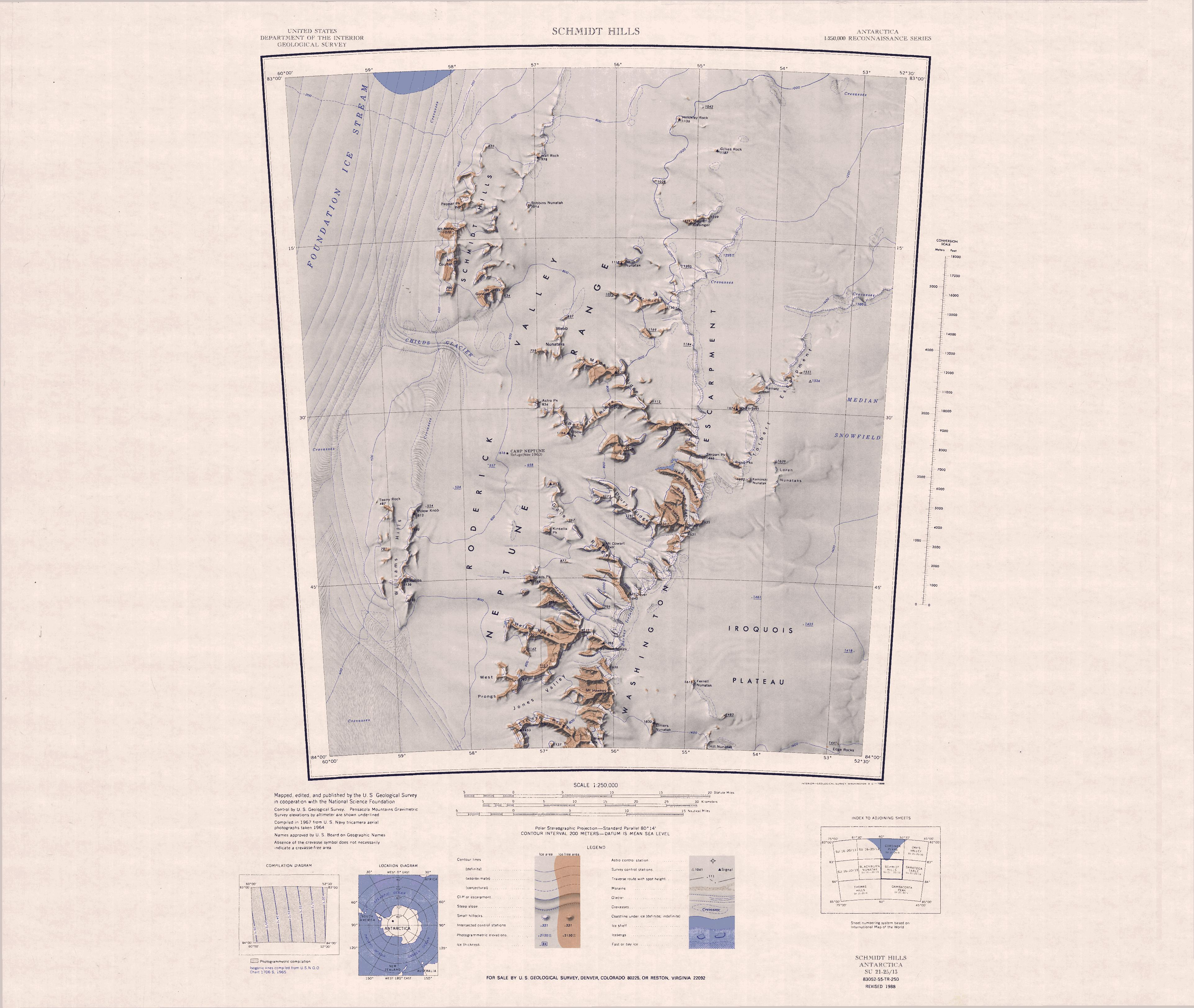
Northern part of the range

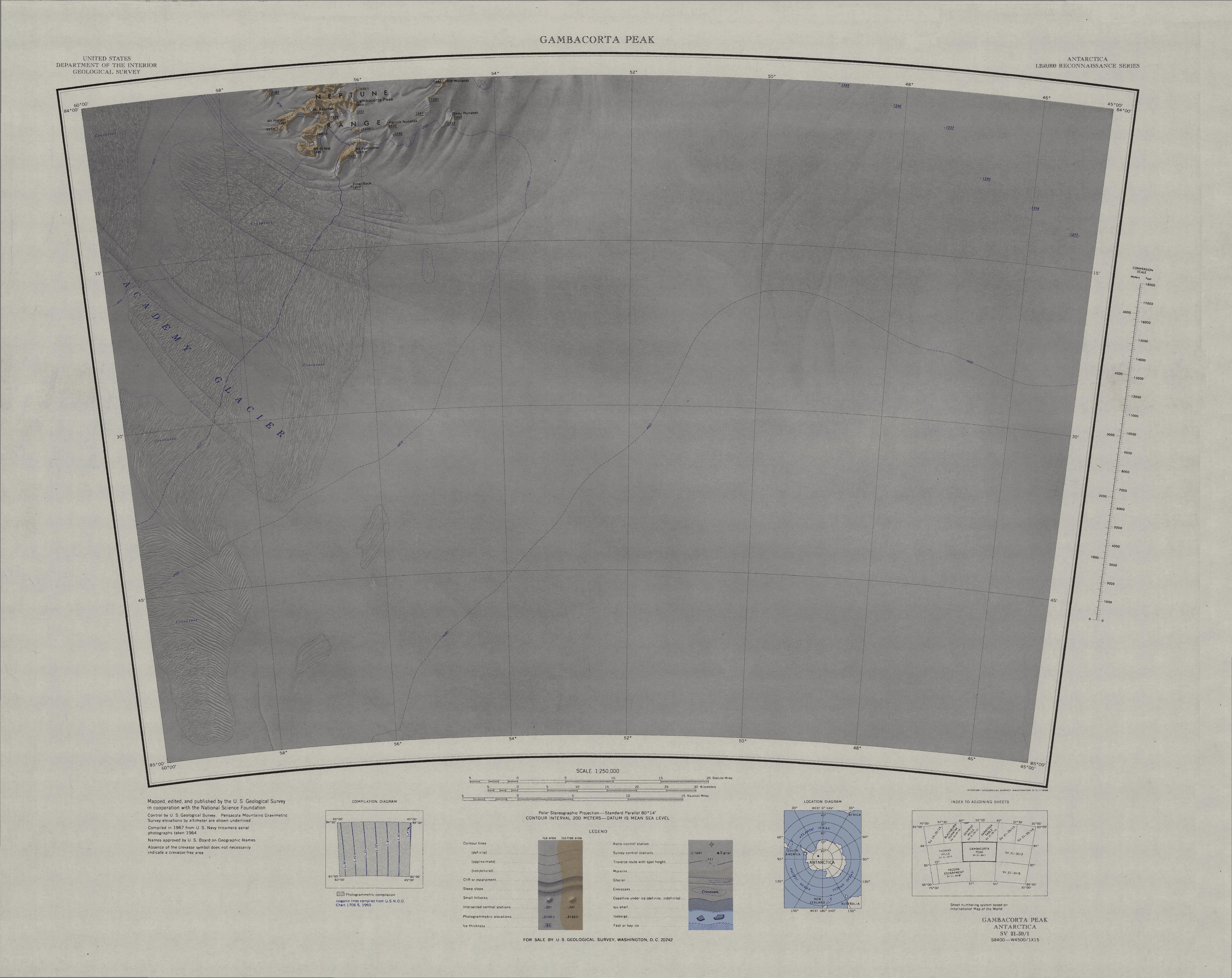
Southern tip of range in northwest of map

The Neptune Range runs from south to north to the east if the Foundation Ice Stream. Childs Glacier flows west from the range to join the ice stream, The Academy Glacier flows northwest between the Patuxent Range and the southern tip of the Neptune Range to join the ice stream. The Cordiner Peaks are to the north. The Iroquois Plateau and the Median Snowfield are to the east.

== Glaciers ==
- Foundation Ice Stream (83°15′S 60°00′W), a major ice stream in the Pensacola Mountains of Antarctica. The ice stream drains northward for 150 nautical miles (280 km; 170 mi) along the west side of the Patuxent Range and the Neptune Range to enter the Ronne Ice Shelf westward of Dufek Massif.
- Childs Glacier (83°24′S 58°40′W), a glacier in the Neptune Range, draining westward from Roderick Valley to enter Foundation Ice Stream.
- Academy Glacier (84°15′S 61°00′W), a major glacier in the Pensacola Mountains, draining northwestward between the Patuxent and Neptune Ranges to enter Foundation Ice Stream.

== Peaks ==
Peaks over 1,500 metres (4,900 ft) high include:

Mountain	m	ft	coord
Mount Hawkes	1,975	6,480	83°55′S 56°5′W
Gambacorta Peak	1,840	6,040	84°2′S 56°3′W
Mount Dover	1,645	5,397	83°46′S 55°50′W
Nelson Peak	1,605	5,266	83°40′S 55°3′W
Mount Kaschak	1,580	5,180	84°02′S 56°40′W
Mount Feldkotter	1,510	4,950	84°06′S 56°06′W

== Washington Escarpment ==
83°42′S 55°08′W. The major west-facing escarpment of the Neptune Range, extending some 50 nautical miles (93 km; 58 mi) and being the point of origin of a number of west-trending rock ridges. Mapped by the United States Geological Survey (USGS) from surveys and United States Navy air photographs in 1956-66. Named by the United States Advisory Committee on Antarctic Names (US-ACAN) for the University of Washington at Seattle. Several members of the Neptune Range field party of 1963-64 attended this university.

Features, from north to south, include

- Mount Moffat (83°32′S 55°17′W) is a mountain, 1,250 metres (4,100 ft) high, standing 4 nautical miles (7.4 km; 4.6 mi) northeast of Mount Ege.
- Nelson Peak (83°40′S 55°3′W), a 1,605 metres (5,266 ft) peak in Antarctica, standing at the eastern end of Drury Ridge and Brown Ridge where the two ridges abut Washington Escarpment.
- Mount Dover (83°46′S 55°50′W), a mountain 1,645 metres (5,397 ft) high surmounting the southeast end of Gale Ridge where the ridge abuts the Washington Escarpment.
- Mount Hawkes (83°55′S 56°5′W), at 1,975 metres (6,480 ft), the highest mountain along the Washington Escarpment, standing at the east side of Jones Valley.
- Gambacorta Peak (84°2′S 56°3′W), a peak 1,840 metres (6,040 ft) high, standing 4 nautical miles (7.4 km; 4.6 mi) east of Mount Kaschak in the southern Neptune Range.

== Other features ==
- Schmidt Hills (83°14′S 57°48′W), a group of rock hills, 15 nautical miles (28 km; 17 mi) long, lying north of Childs Glacier and west of Roderick Valley.
- Williams Hills (83°42′S 58°55′W), a compact group of hills, 10 nautical miles (19 km; 12 mi) long, located south of Childs Glacier and west of Roderick Valley.
- Torbert Escarpment (83°29′S 54°8′W), an escarpment, 15 nautical miles (28 km; 17 mi) long, marking the west margin of Median Snowfield.
- Iroquois Plateau (83°51′S 54°0′W), a large, mainly ice-covered plateau situated east of the southern part of the Washington Escarpment in the Pensacola Mountains, Antarctica.

== Sources ==
- Alberts, Fred G., ed. (1995), Geographic Names of the Antarctic (PDF) (2 ed.), United States Board on Geographic Names This article incorporates public domain material from websites or documents of the United States Board on Geographic Names.
- Gambacorta Peak, USGS: United States Geological Survey
- Schmidt Hills, USGS: United States Geological Survey
- This article incorporates public domain material from websites or documents of the United States Geological Survey.
