= Iroquois Plateau =

Mount Dover
- Location within Antarctica

Geography
- Range coordinates: 83°51′S 54°0′W
- Parent range: Neptune Range, Pensacola Mountains, Antarctica

The Iroquois Plateau (83°51′S 54°0′W) is a large, mainly ice-covered plateau situated east of the southern part of the Washington Escarpment in the Pensacola Mountains, Antarctica.

== Mapping and name ==
The Iroquois Plateau was mapped by the United States Geological Survey (USGS) from surveys and United States Navy air photographs in 1956–66. It was named by the United States Advisory Committee on Antarctic Names after the Bell UH-1 Iroquois helicopter which has greatly facilitated field operations in Antarctica.

== Location ==
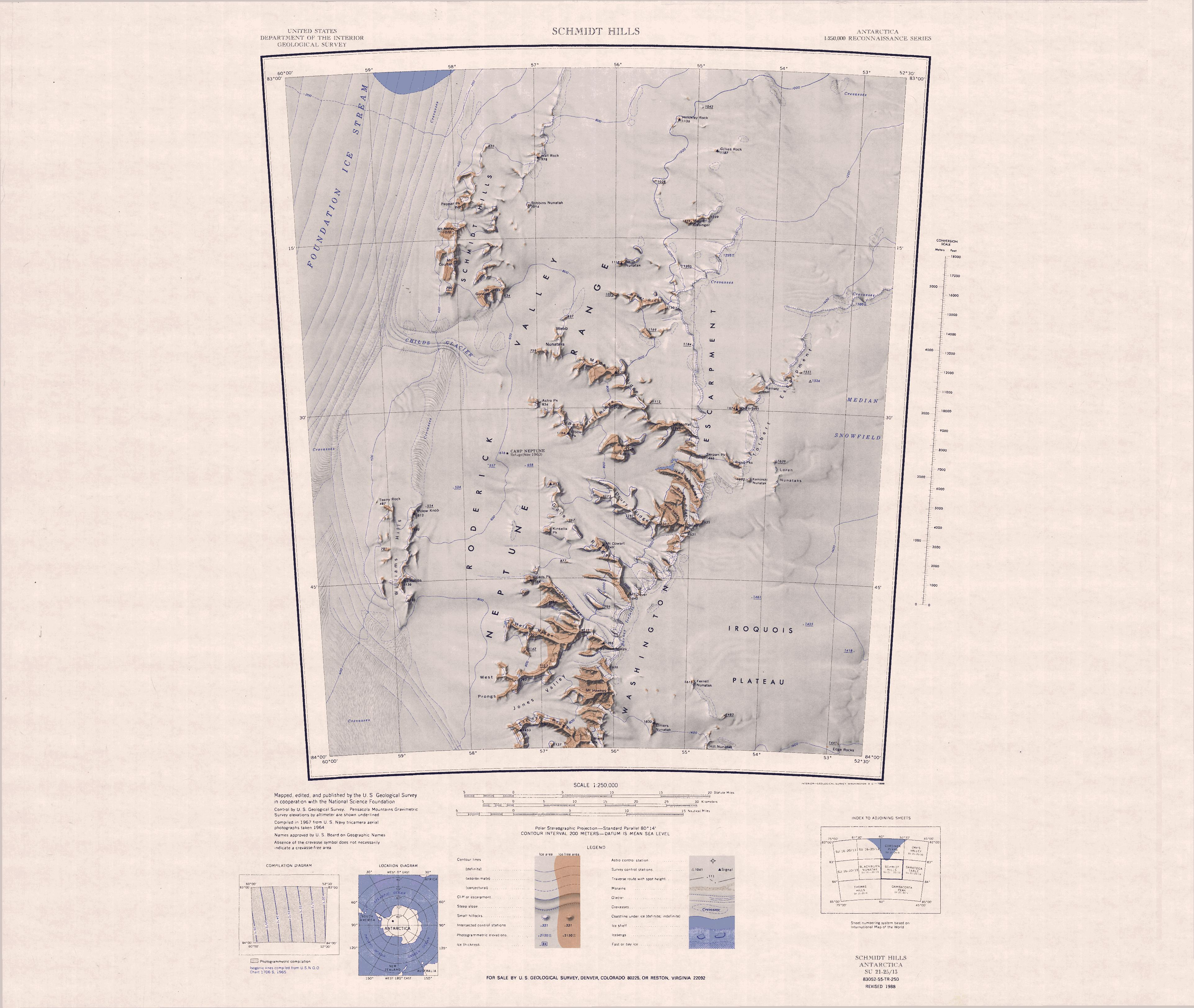
Northern part of the Neptune Range

The Iroquois Plateau is in the Neptune Range. It is east of the Washington Escarpment and south of the Median Snowfield. Scattered nunataks on the plateau include Elmers Nunatak, Ferrell Nunatak, Hill Nunatak and the Edge Rocks.

== Features ==
=== Elmers Nunatak ===
83°58′S 55°25′W. A prominent nunatak 5 nautical miles (9.3 km; 5.8 mi) southeast of Mount Hawkes. Named by US-ACAN for Elmer H. Smith, aerographer with the wintering parties at Ellsworth Station in 1958 and McMurdo Station in 1961.

=== Ferrell Nunatak ===
83°54′S 54°53′W. A nunatak protruding from the ice surface of Iroquois Plateau 5 nautical miles (9.3 km; 5.8 mi) northeast of Elmers Nunatak. Named by US-ACAN for James T. Ferrell, construction mechanic at Ellsworth Station, winter 1958.

=== Hill Nunatak ===
84°00′S 54°45′W. A prominent nunatak rising above the ice at the southeast end of the Neptune Range, 8 nautical miles (15 km; 9.2 mi) east-northeast of Gambacorta Peak. Discovered and photographed on January 13, 1956, during a United States Navy transcontinental plane flight from McMurdo Sound to the Weddell Sea and return. Named by US-ACAN for Jack O. Hill, aerial photographer on this flight.

=== Edge Rocks ===
83°59′S 52°55′W. Two rock exposures at the southeast margin of Iroquois Plateau, 11 nautical miles (20 km; 13 mi) east of Hill Nunatak. Given this name by US-ACAN because of their fringe position with relation to Iroquois Plateau.

== Sources ==
- Alberts, Fred G., ed. (1995), Geographic Names of the Antarctic (PDF) (2 ed.), United States Board on Geographic Names This article incorporates public domain material from websites or documents of the United States Board on Geographic Names.
- Schmidt Hills, USGS: United States Geological Survey
- This article incorporates public domain material from websites or documents of the United States Geological Survey.
