= Torbert Escarpment =

Escarpment in Antarctica

- Location within Antarctica

Geography
- Range coordinates: 83°29′S 54°8′W
- Parent range: Neptune Range

Torbert Escarpment (83°29′S 54°8′W) is an escarpment, 15 nautical miles (28 km; 17 mi) long, marking the west margin of Median Snowfield in the Neptune Range, Pensacola Mountains, Antarctica.

== Mapping and name ==
The Torbert Escarpment was mapped by United States Geological Survey (USGS) from surveys and United States Navy air photographs in 1956–66. It was named by the United States Advisory Committee on Antarctic Names (US-ACAN) after Mount Torbert, the salient feature along its edge.

== Location ==
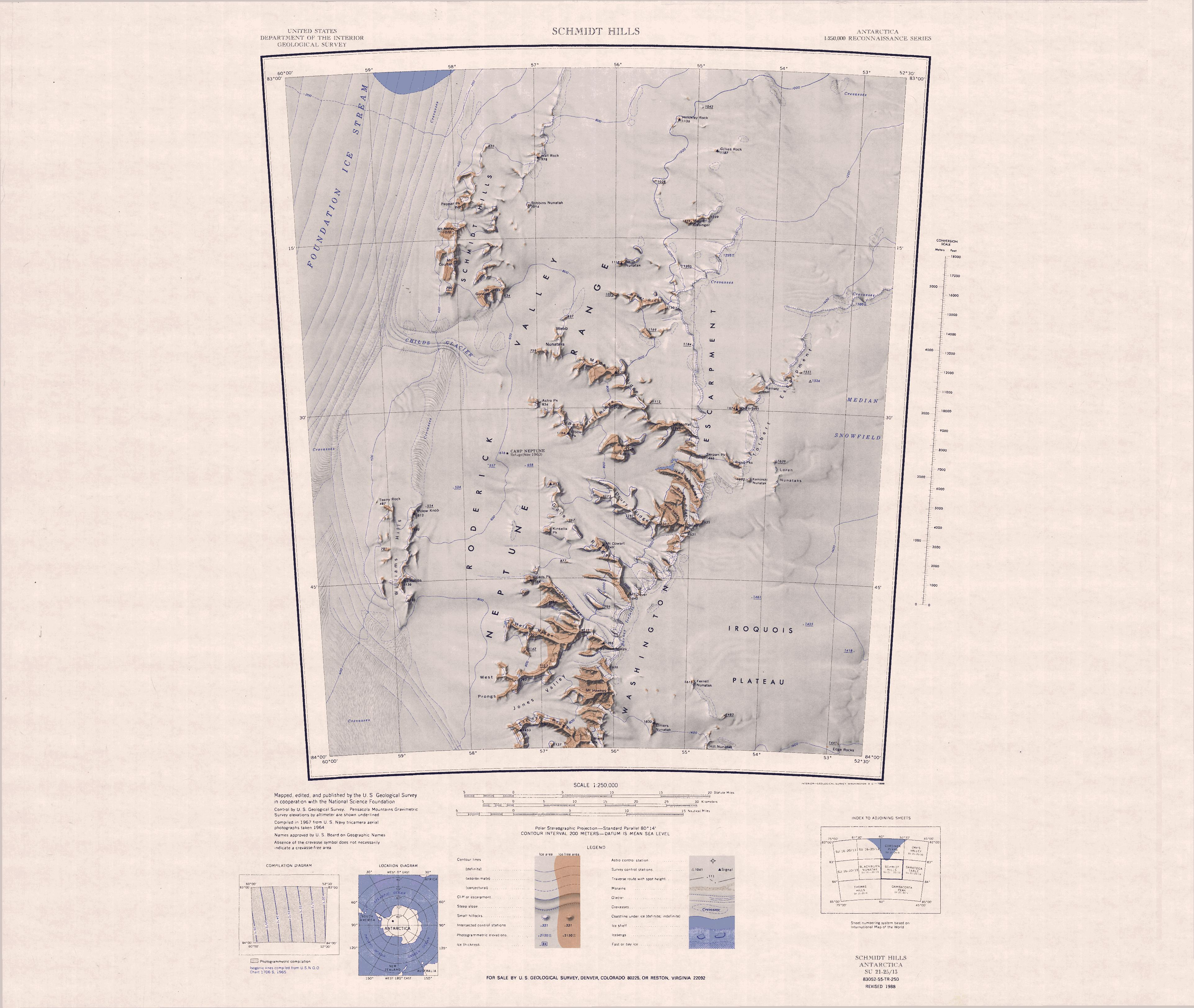
Torbert Escarpment in the northeast

The Torbert Escarpment faces west in the northeast of the Neptune Range. It runs roughly north–south between the Median Snowfield to the east, and the north end of the Washington Escarpment to the west. Festures include, from south to north, Rivas Peaks, Mount Torbert and Ramsey Cliff. Nearby features to the east include Kaminski Nunatak, Loren Nunataks and Median Snowfield.

== Features ==
Features and nearby features include:

=== Kaminski Nunatak ===
83°36′S 54°12′W. A cone-shaped nunatak 1.5 nautical miles (2.8 km; 1.7 mi) southeast of Rivas Peaks. Named by US-ACAN for Francis Kaminski, aerographer at Ellsworth Station, winter 1958.

=== Loren Nunataks ===
83°36′S 53°52′W. A line of low nunataks standing 3 nautical miles (5.6 km; 3.5 mi) east of Rivas Peaks. Named by US-ACAN for Loren Brown, Jr., aviation machinist at Ellsworth Station, winter 1958.

=== Rivas Peaks ===
83°35′S 54°25′W. A line of rock peaks that jut westward for 2 nautical miles (3.7 km; 2.3 mi) from the south part of Torbert Escarpment. Named by US-ACAN for Merced G. Rivas, radioman at Ellsworth Station, winter 1958.

=== Mount Torbert ===
83°30′S 54°25′W. A prominent, pyramidal rock peak, 1,675 metres (5,495 ft) high, midway along Torbert Escarpment. Discovered and photographed on January 13, 1956 on the transcontinental nonstop plane flight by personnel of United States Navy Operation Deep Freeze I from McMurdo Sound to Weddell Sea and return. Named by US-ACAN for Lieutenant Commander John H. Torbert, United States Navy, pilot of the P2V-2N Neptune aircraft making this flight.

=== Ramsey Cliff ===
83°28′S 54°09′W. A rock cliff along Torbert Escarpment, standing 2 nautical miles (3.7 km; 2.3 mi) northeast of Mount Torbert. Named by US-ACAN for Robert E. Ramsey, storekeeper at Ellsworth Station, winter 1958.

=== Median Snowfield ===
83°30′S 52°30′W. A large snowfield in the Pensacola Mountains between Torbert Escarpment and the southern part of the Forrestal Range. This name given by US-ACAN reflects the position of the feature between the Neptune and Forrestal Ranges.

== Sources ==
- Alberts, Fred G., ed. (1995), Geographic Names of the Antarctic (PDF) (2 ed.), United States Board on Geographic Names This article incorporates public domain material from websites or documents of the United States Board on Geographic Names.
- Schmidt Hills, USGS: United States Geological Survey
- This article incorporates public domain material from websites or documents of the United States Geological Survey.
