= Foundation Ice Stream =

Major ice stream in Antarctica

- Location within Antarctica
- Location: Queen Elizabeth Land
- Coordinates: 83°15′S 60°00′W
- Length: 150 nautical miles (280 km; 170 mi)
- Thickness: unknown
- Terminus: Filchner-Ronne Ice Shelf
- Status: unknown

Foundation Ice Stream (83°15′S 60°00′W) is a major ice stream in the Pensacola Mountains of Antarctica. The ice stream drains northward for 150 nautical miles (280 km; 170 mi) along the west side of the Patuxent Range and the Neptune Range to enter the Ronne Ice Shelf westward of Dufek Massif.

== Exploration and name ==
The United States Geological Survey (USGS) mapped the stream from surveys and United States Navy air photos, 1956–66. The United States Advisory Committee on Antarctic Names (US-ACAN) named the stream in recognition of the National Science Foundation, which provided major support to the U.S. Antarctic Research Program during this period.

== Course ==
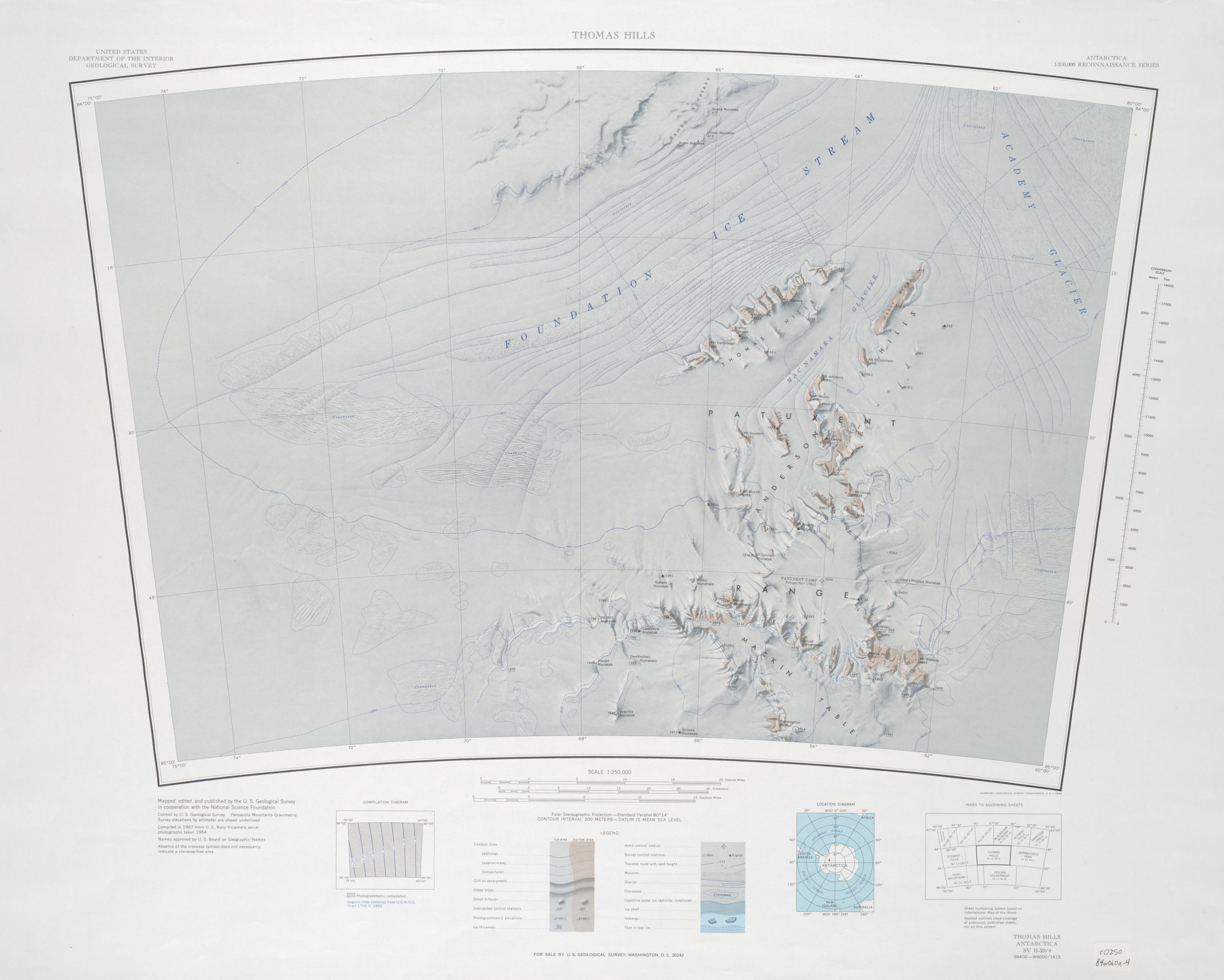
Head of the ice stream

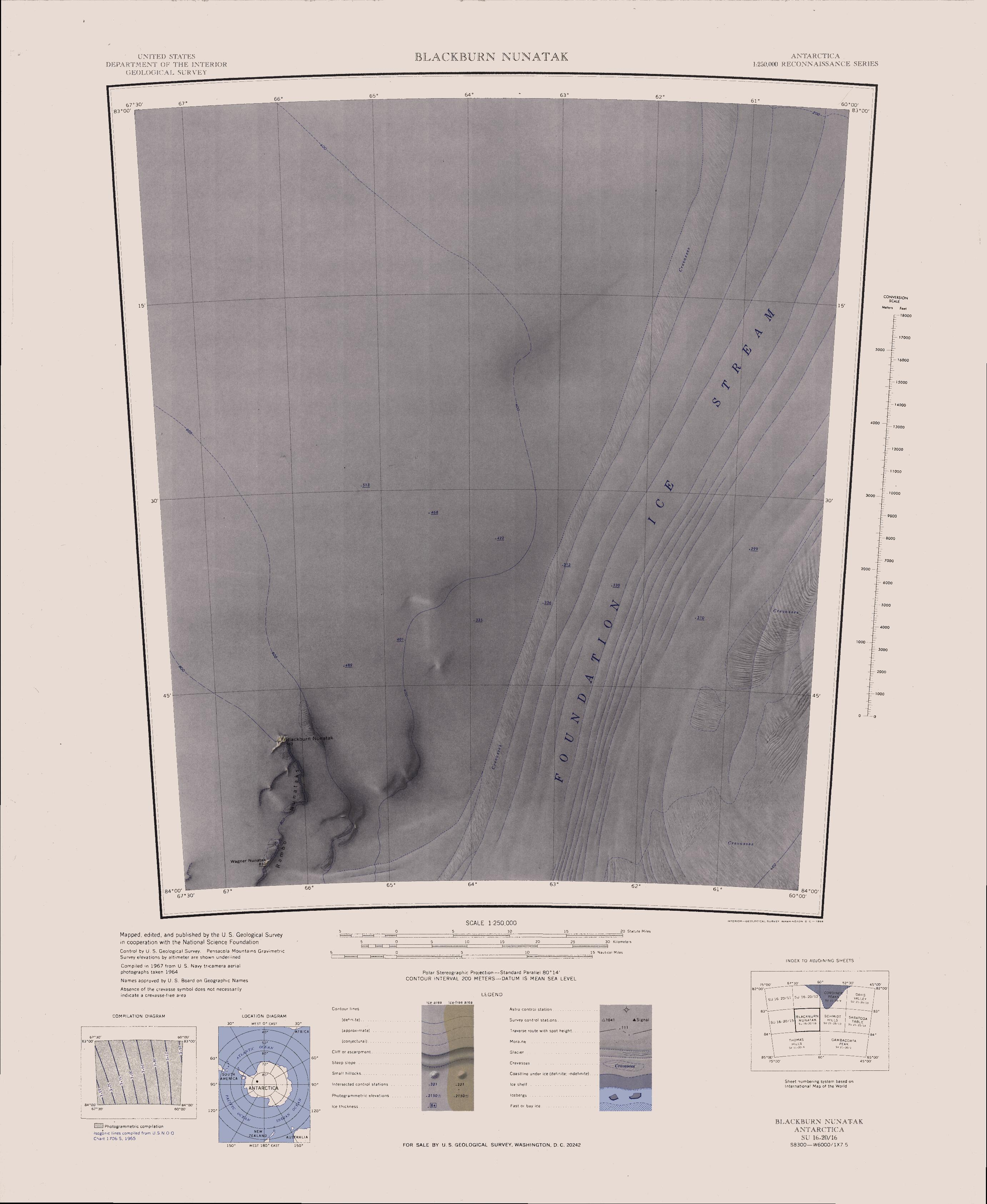
west of mid-section

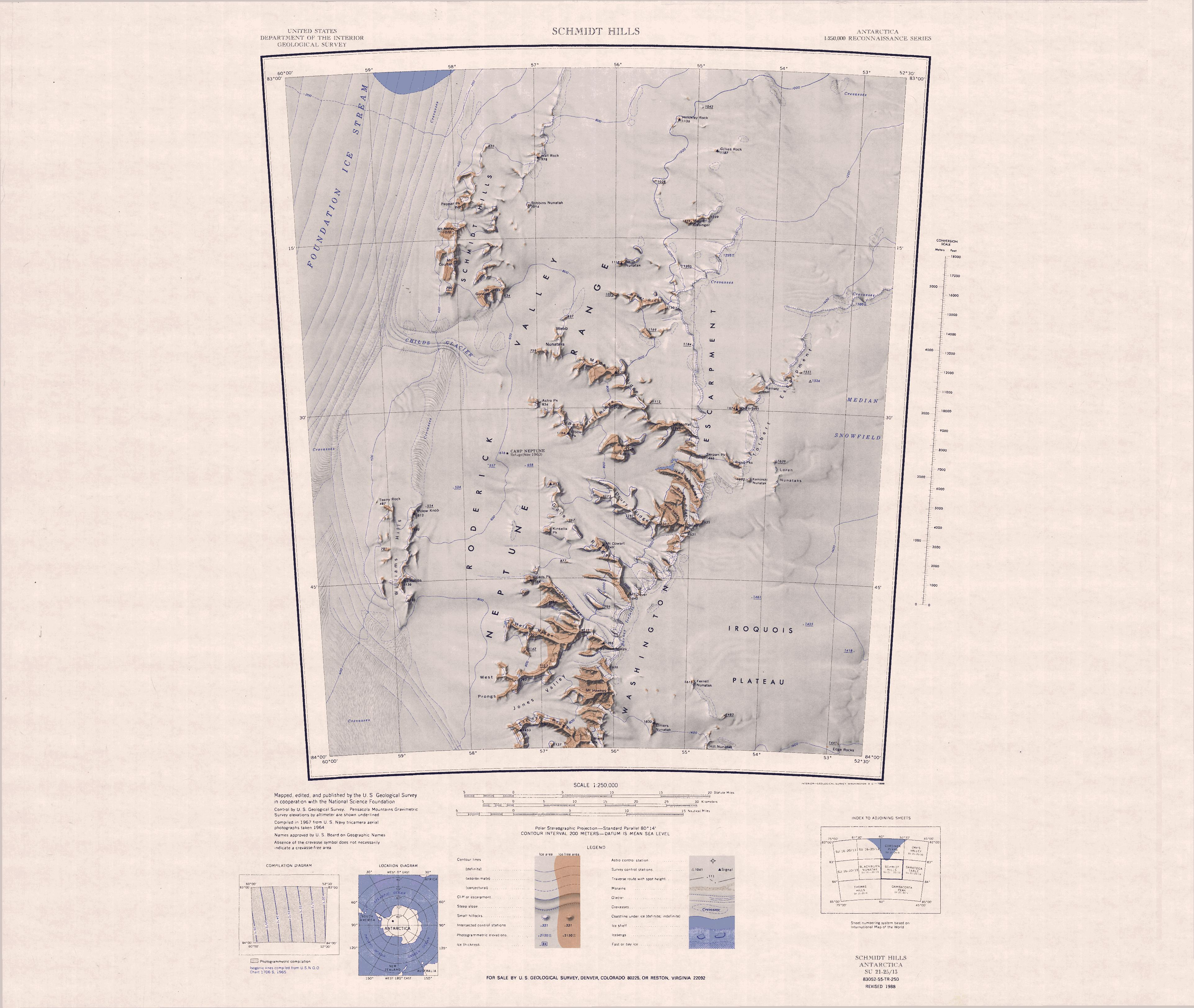
east of mid-section

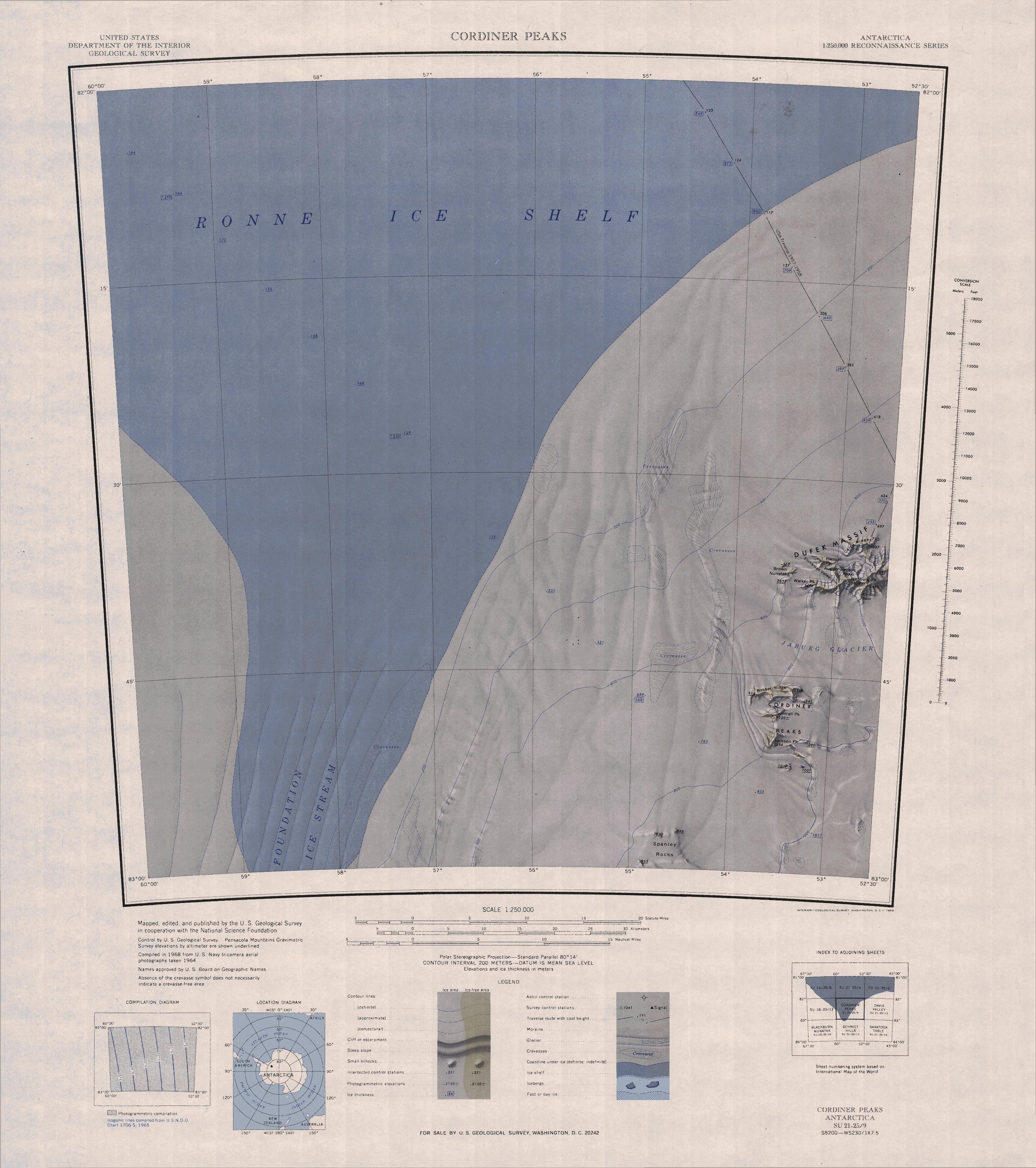
Mouth of the ice stream

The Foundation Ice Stream originates to the west of the Patuxent Range. It flows northwest past the Rambo Nunataks to the north and Thomas Hills to the south, where it is joined from the right (south) by the MacNamara Glacier. Further down the Academy Glacier joins it from the right. The ice stream continues north-northwest past the Williams Hills of the Neptune Range. It is joined from the east by the Childs Glacier before passing Schmidt Hills to its east. The mouth of the ice stream meets the Ronne Ice Shelf.

== Tributaries ==
=== Patuxent Ice Stream ===
85°15′S 67°45′W. A broad ice stream between Patuxent Range and Pecora Escarpment in the Pensacola Mountains, draining northwestward to the upper part of Foundation Ice Stream. Named by US-ACAN for its proximity to the Patuxent Range.

=== MacNamara Glacier ===
84°20′S 63°40′W. A glacier in the Patuxent Range, Pensacola Mountains, draining northeastward between the Thomas and Anderson Hills to Foundation Ice Stream. Named by US-ACAN for Edlen E. MacNamara, USARP exchange scientist at Molodezhnaya Station winter 1967.

=== Academy Glacier ===
84°15′S 61°00′W. A major glacier in the Pensacola Mountains, draining northwestward between the Patuxent and Neptune Ranges to enter Foundation Ice Stream. Named by US-ACAN for the National Academy of Sciences which has played an important role in the planning of the United States program for Antarctica.

=== Childs Glacier ===
83°24′S 58°40′W. A glacier in the Neptune Range, Pensacola Mountains, draining westward from Roderick Valley to enter Foundation Ice Stream. Named by US-ACAN for John H. Childs, builder at Ellsworth Station, winter 1958.

== Sources ==
- Alberts, Fred G., ed. (1995), Geographic Names of the Antarctic (PDF) (2 ed.), United States Board on Geographic Names This article incorporates public domain material from websites or documents of the United States Board on Geographic Names.
- Blackburn Nunatak, USGS: United States Geological Survey
- Cordiner Peaks, USGS: United States Geological Survey
- Schmidt Hills, USGS: United States Geological Survey
- Thomas Hills, USGS: United States Geological Survey
- This article incorporates public domain material from websites or documents of the United States Geological Survey.
