= Schmidt Hills =

Hills in Antarctica

- Location within Antarctica

Geography
- Range coordinates: 83°14′S 57°48′W
- Parent range: Neptune Range

Schmidt Hills (83°14′S 57°48′W) is a group of rock hills, 15 nautical miles (28 km; 17 mi) long, lying north of Childs Glacier and west of Roderick Valley in the Neptune Range of the Pensacola Mountains, Antarctica.

== Mapping and name ==
The Schmidt Hills were mapped by the United States Geological Survey (USGS) from surveys and United States Navy air photos and 1956–1966. They were named by the United States Advisory Committee on Antarctic Names (US-ACAN) for Dwight L. Schmidt, USGS geologist to the Pensacola Mountains in 1962–63, 1963–64 and 1965–66.

== Location ==
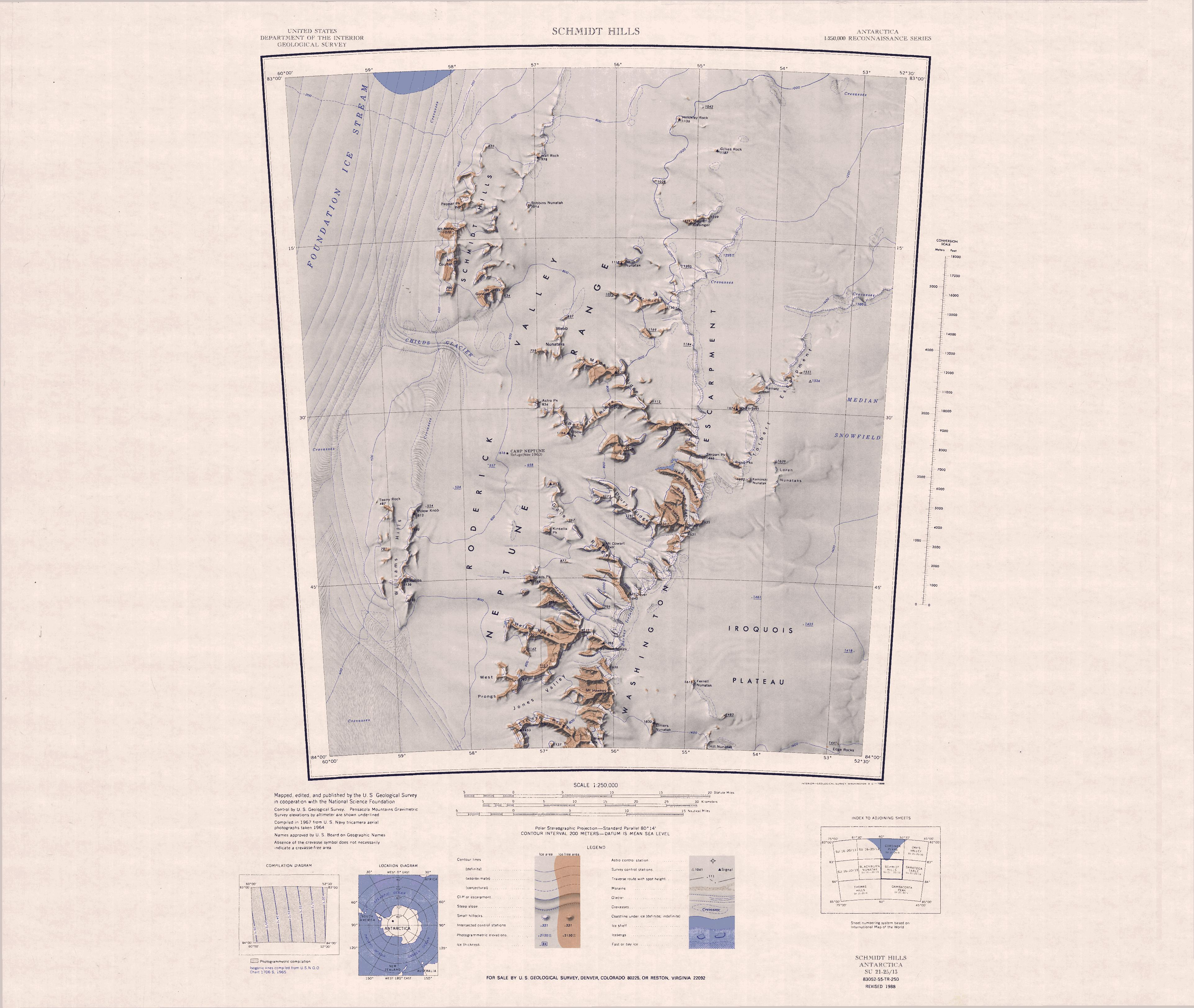
Schmidt Hills in the northwest

The Schmidt Hills are in the northwest of the Neptune Range on the east side of the Foundation Ice Stream near the point where it joins the Ronne Ice Shelf. They are north of the Williams Hills and west of the northern end of the Washington Escarpment, from which they are separated by the Roderick Valley. Features include, from south to north, Mount Gorecki, Mount Coulter, Mount Nervo, Pepper Peak, Robbins Nunatak and Wall Rock.

== Features ==
=== Mount Gorecki ===
83°20′S 57°35′W. A mountain, 1,110 metres (3,640 ft) high, at the southeast extremity of Schmidt Hills. It was discovered and photographed on January 13, 1956, on a United States Navy transcontinental non-stop plane flight from McMurdo sound to Weddell Sea and return. It was named by US-ACAN for aviation electronics technician Francis Gorecki, radioman of the P2V-2N aircraft making the flight.

=== Mount Coulter ===
83°17′S 58°02′W. A mountain 3 nautical miles (5.6 km; 3.5 mi) northwest of Mount Gorecki. It was named by US-ACAN for LeRoy G. Coulter, cook at Ellsworth Station, winter 1958.

=== Mount Nervo ===
83°14′S 58°00′W. A mountain, 1,070 metres (3,510 ft) high, standing 3 nautical miles (5.6 km; 3.5 mi) north of Mount Coulter. The mountain was named by US-ACAN for George W. Nervo, radioman at Ellsworth Station, winter 1958.

=== Pepper Peak ===
83°12′S 57°55′W. A sharp peak,940 metres (3,080 ft) high, standing 2 nautical miles (3.7 km; 2.3 mi) north of Mount Nervo. It was named by US-ACAN for Clifford G. Pepper, hospital corpsman at Ellsworth Station, winter 1958.

=== Robbins Nunatak ===
83°12′S 57°05′W. A conspicuous nunatak 8 nautical miles (15 km; 9.2 mi) northeast of Mount Gorecki. It was named by US-ACAN for Edward J. Robbins, aerographer at Ellsworth Station, winter 1958.

=== Wall Rock ===
83°08′S 56°57′W. A rock 4 nautical miles (7.4 km; 4.6 mi) north of Robbins Nunatak. The rock was named by US-ACAN for John Wall, a member of the Electronic Test Unit in the Pensacola Mountains, 1957–58.

=== Roderick Valley ===
83°30′S 57°30′W. A large ice-filled valley trending in a north–south direction and separating Schmidt Hills and Williams Hills from the main mass of the Neptune Range. It was named by US-ACAN for Captain David W. Roderick, United States Air Force, pilot and second in command of the Electronic Test Unit in the Pensacola Mountains, 1957–58.

== Sources ==
- Alberts, Fred G., ed. (1995), Geographic Names of the Antarctic (PDF) (2 ed.), United States Board on Geographic Names This article incorporates public domain material from websites or documents of the United States Board on Geographic Names.
- Schmidt Hills, USGS: United States Geological Survey
- This article incorporates public domain material from websites or documents of the United States Geological Survey.
