= Pensacola Mountains =

Group of mountain ranges in the Queen Elizabeth Land region of Antarctica

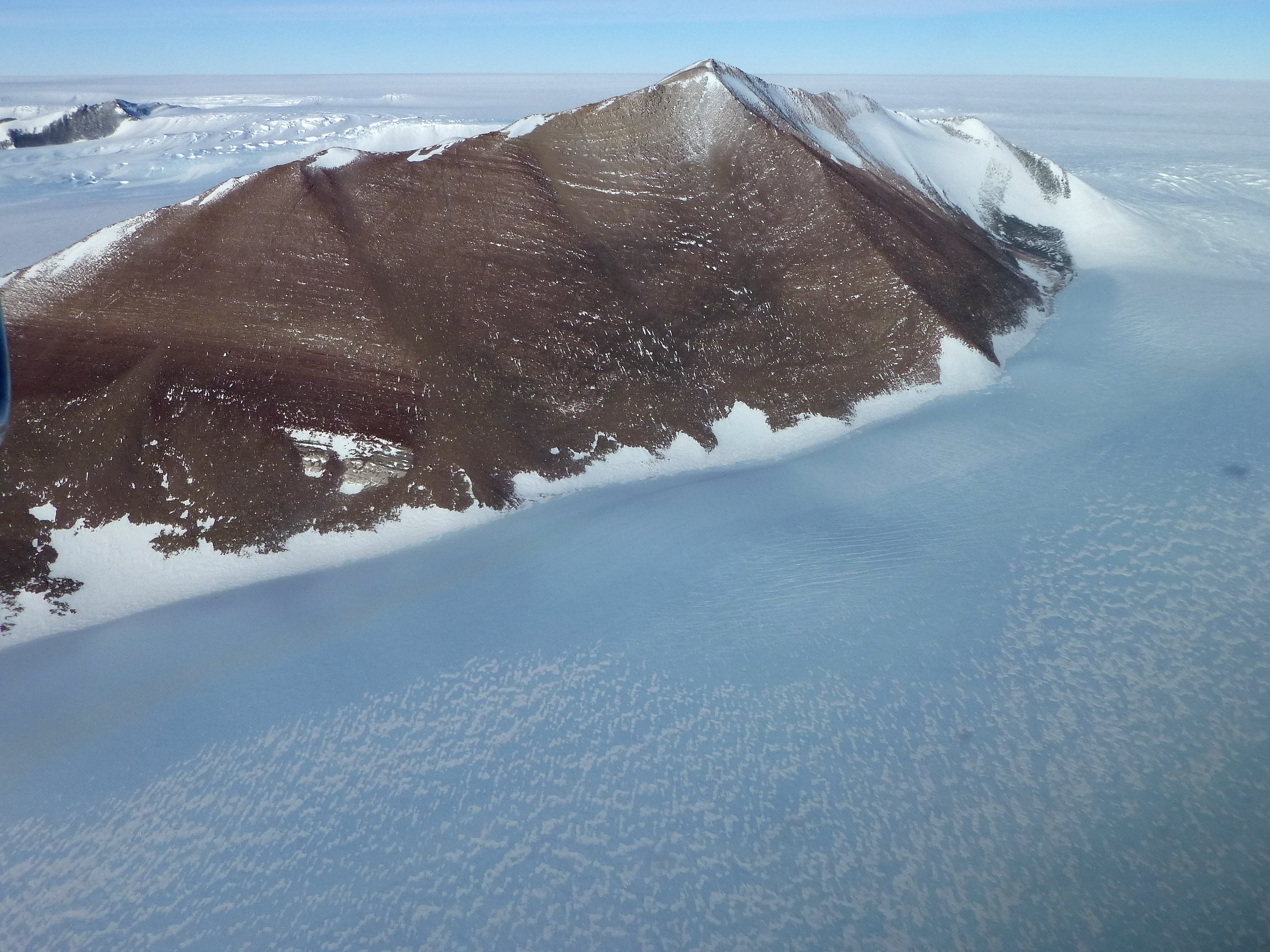

Highest point
- Peak: England Peak
- Elevation: 2,150 m (7,050 ft)
- Coordinates: 82°37′S 52°49′W

Dimensions
- Length: 450 km (280 mi)
- Area: 86,850 km^{2} (33,530 mi^{2})

Geography
- Location within Antarctica
- Continent: Antarctica
- Region: Queen Elizabeth Land
- Range coordinates: 84°2′S 61°22′W
- Parent range: Transantarctic Mountains

The Pensacola Mountains (82°37′S 52°49′W) are a large group of mountain ranges and peaks that extend 280 nautical miles (520 km; 320 mi) in a northeast–southwest direction in the Transantarctic Mountains System, Queen Elizabeth Land region of Antarctica. They comprise the Argentina Range, Forrestal Range, Dufek Massif, Cordiner Peaks, Neptune Range, Patuxent Range, Rambo Nunataks and Pecora Escarpment. These mountain units lie astride the extensive Foundation Ice Stream and Support Force Glacier which drain northward to the Ronne Ice Shelf.

== Discovery and naming ==
The Pensacola Mountains were discovered and photographed on 13 January 1956 in the course of a transcontinental nonstop plane flight by personnel of United States Navy Operation Deep Freeze I from McMurdo Sound to Weddell Sea and return. They were named by the United States Advisory Committee on Antarctic Names (US-ACAN) for the U.S. Naval Air Station, Pensacola, Florida, in commemoration of the historic role of that establishment in training aviators of the United States Navy. The mountains were mapped in detail by United States Geological Survey (USGS) from surveys and United States Navy air photos in 1956–67.

== Geology ==
The Pensacola Mountains were originally continuous with the Ventana Mountains near Bahía Blanca in Argentina, Cape Fold Belt in South Africa, the Ellsworth Mountains (West Antarctica) and the Hunter-Bowen orogeny in eastern Australia.

The Ordovician-Devonian Neptune Group rests unconformably on a Cambrian succession, and is overlain disconformably by the Dover Sandstone of the Beacon Supergroup. Within the Neptune Group is the Brown Ridge Conglomerate, Elliott Sandstone, Elbow Formation, and the Heiser Sandstone.

== Western features ==
The Foundation Ice Stream flows through the western part of the range.

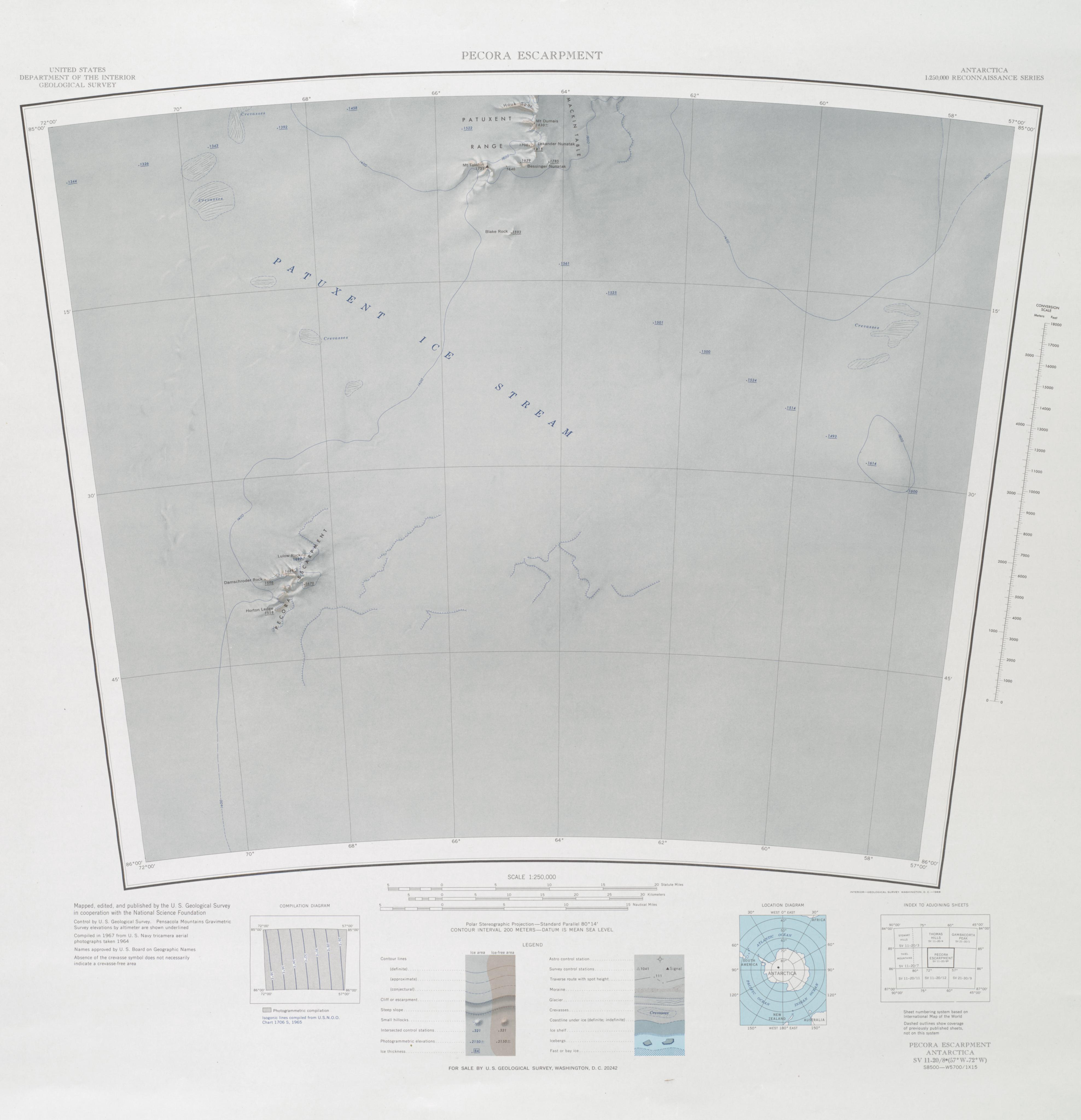
Pecora Escarpment, South tip of Patuxent Range

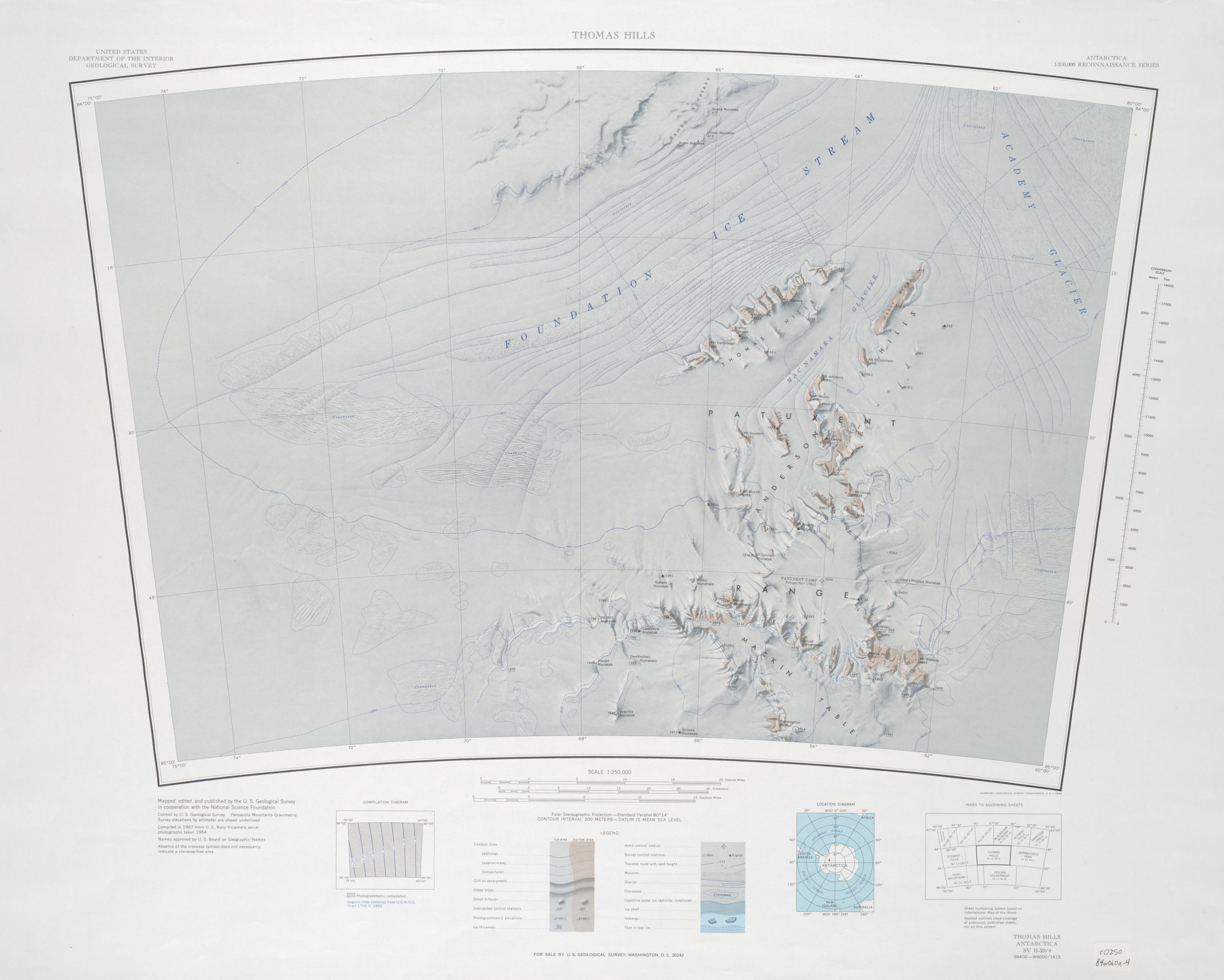
Patuxent Range. Rambo Nunataks to north

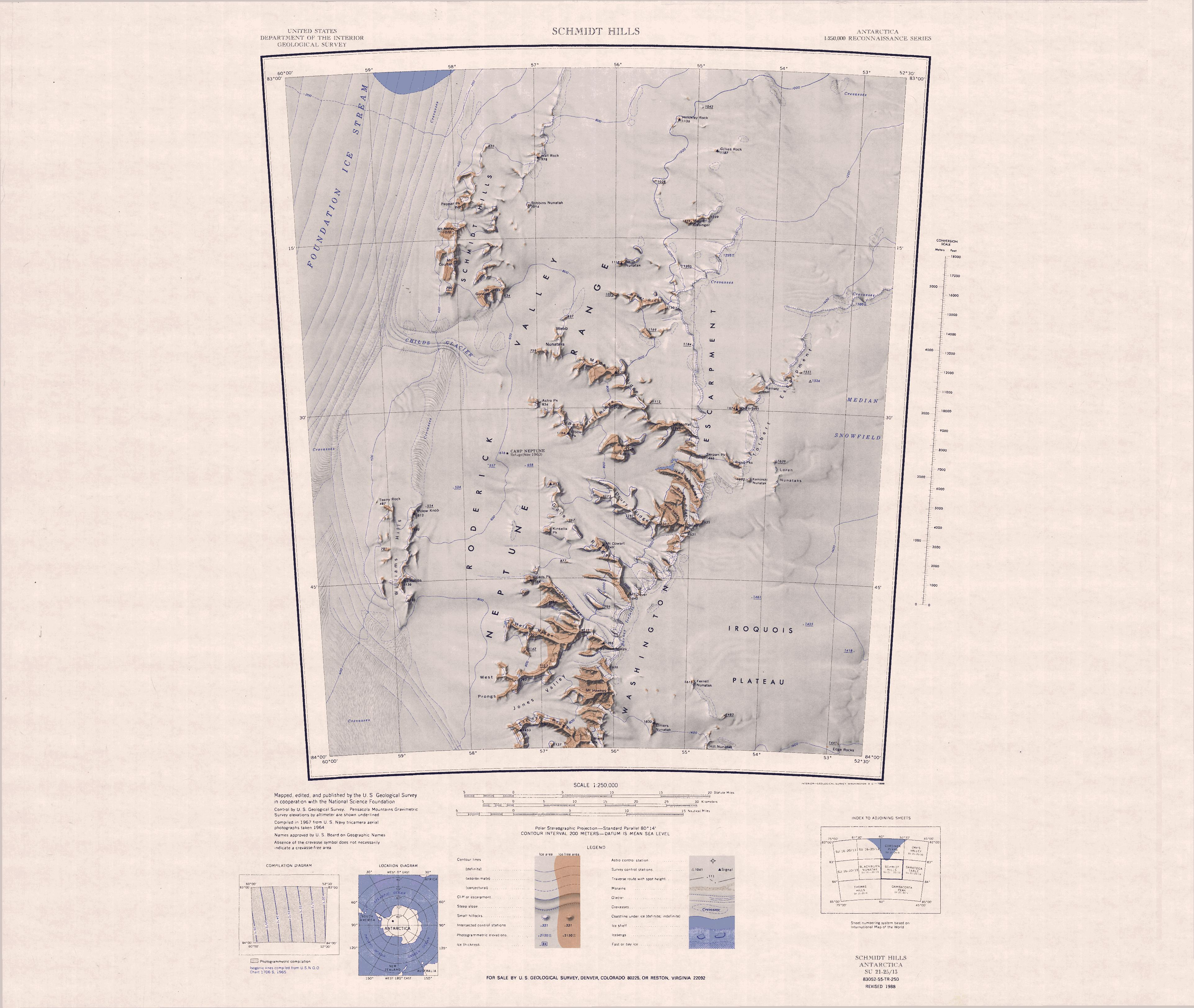
North part of Neptune range
- Pecora Escarpment (85°38′S 68°42′W), an irregular escarpment, 7 nautical miles (13 km; 8.1 mi) long, standing 35 nautical miles (65 km; 40 mi) southwest of Patuxent Range and marking the southernmost exposed rocks of the Pensacola Mountains.
- Patuxent Range (84°43′S 64°30′W), a major range of the Pensacola Mountains. It comprises the Thomas Hills, Anderson Hills, Mackin Table and various nunataks and ridges bounded by the Foundation Ice Stream, Academy Glacier and the Patuxent Ice Stream.
- Rambo Nunataks (83°57′S 66°20′W), a loose chain of nunataks which lie northwest of Patuxent Range and extend along the west side of the Foundation Ice Stream for 17 nautical miles (31 km; 20 mi).
- Neptune Range (83°30′S 056°00′W), a mountain range, 70 nautical miles (130 km; 81 mi) long, lying west-southwest of Forrestal Range in the central part of the Pensacola Mountains. The range comprises Washington Escarpment with its associated ridges, valleys and peaks, the Iroquois Plateau, the Schmidt Hills and Williams Hills.

== Northern features ==
The northern part of the range is to the south of the Filchner–Ronne Ice Shelf.

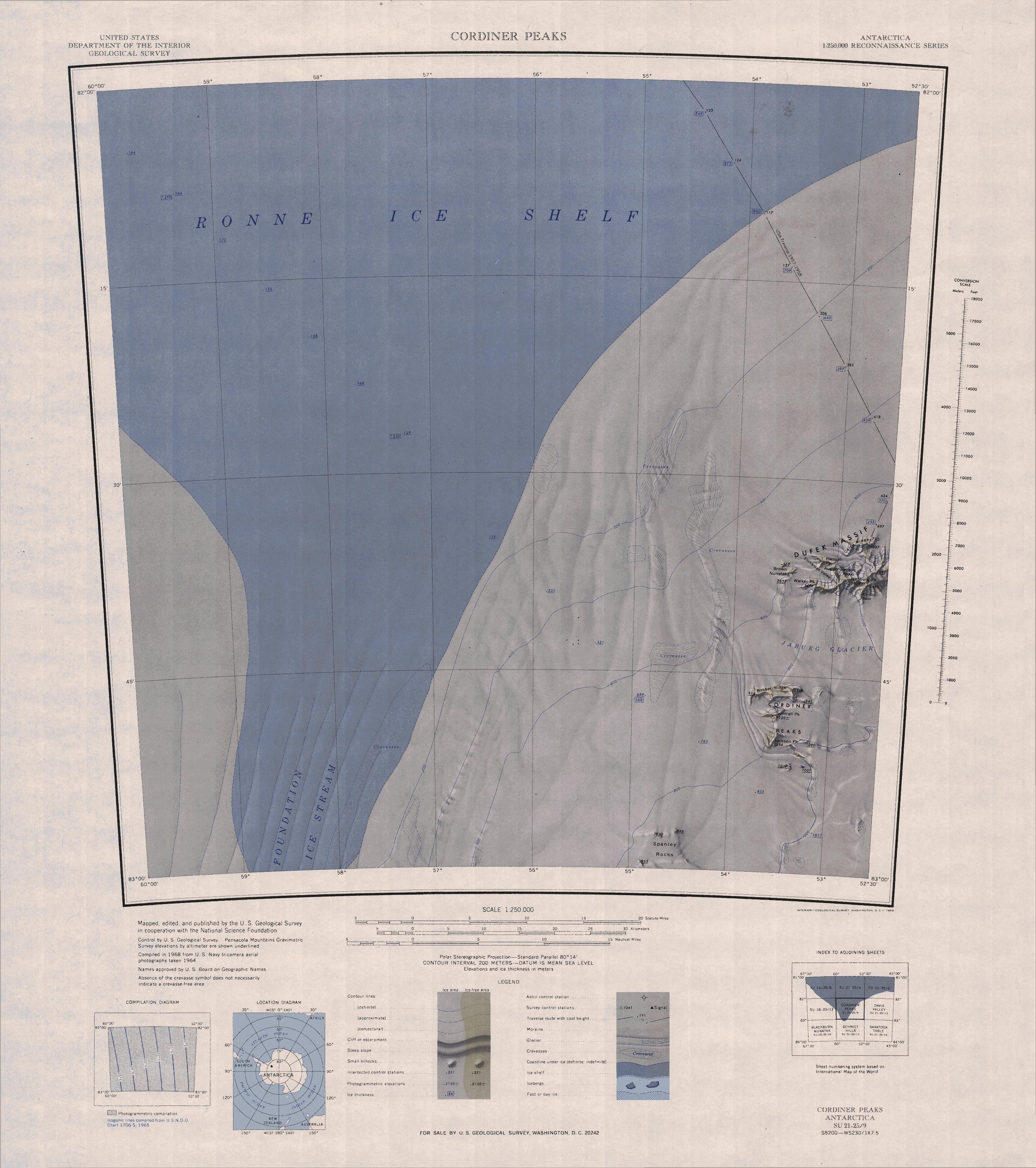
Cordiner Peaks, West part of Dufek Massif

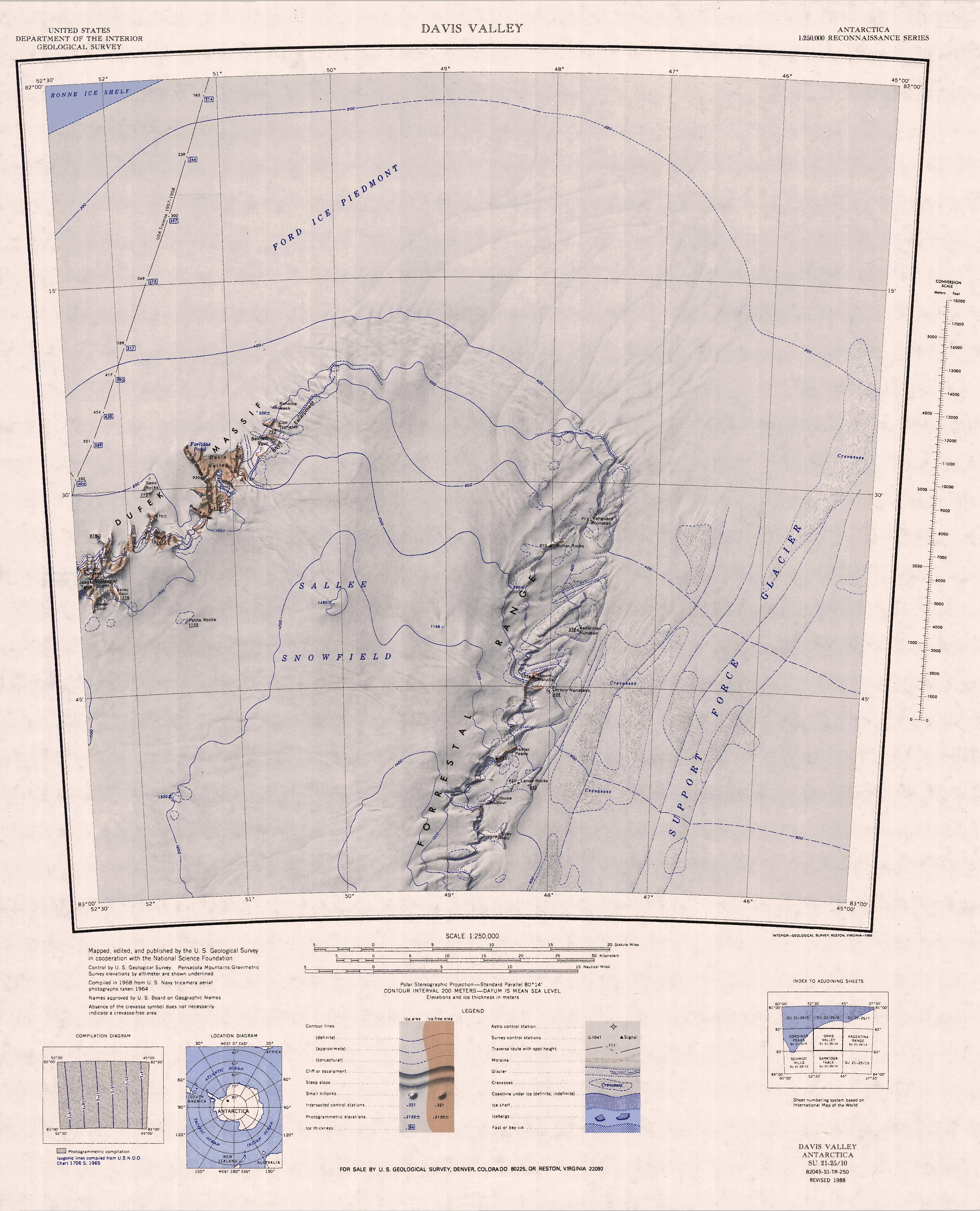
East part of Dufek Massif. North part of Forrestal Range

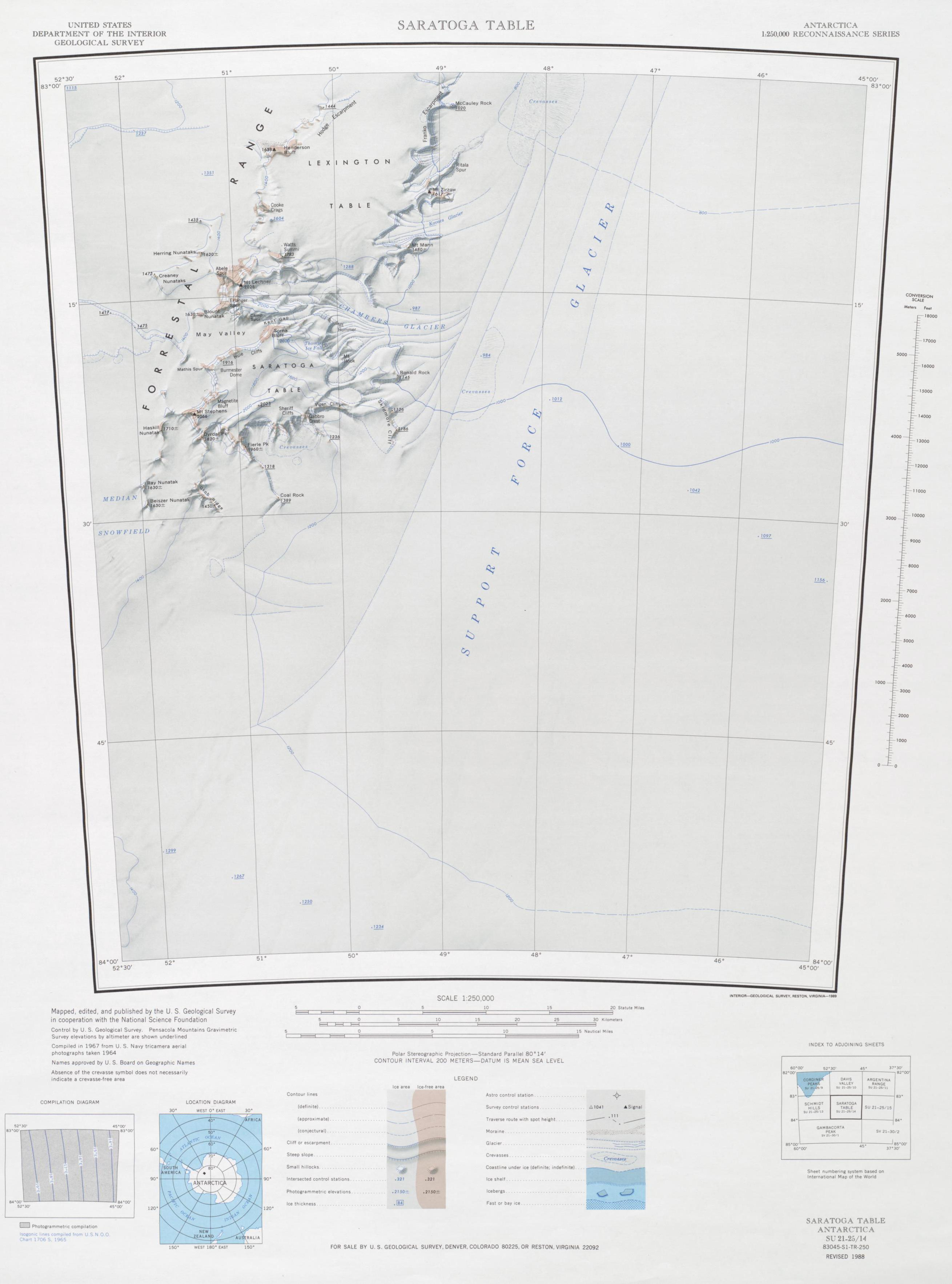
South part of Forrestal Range

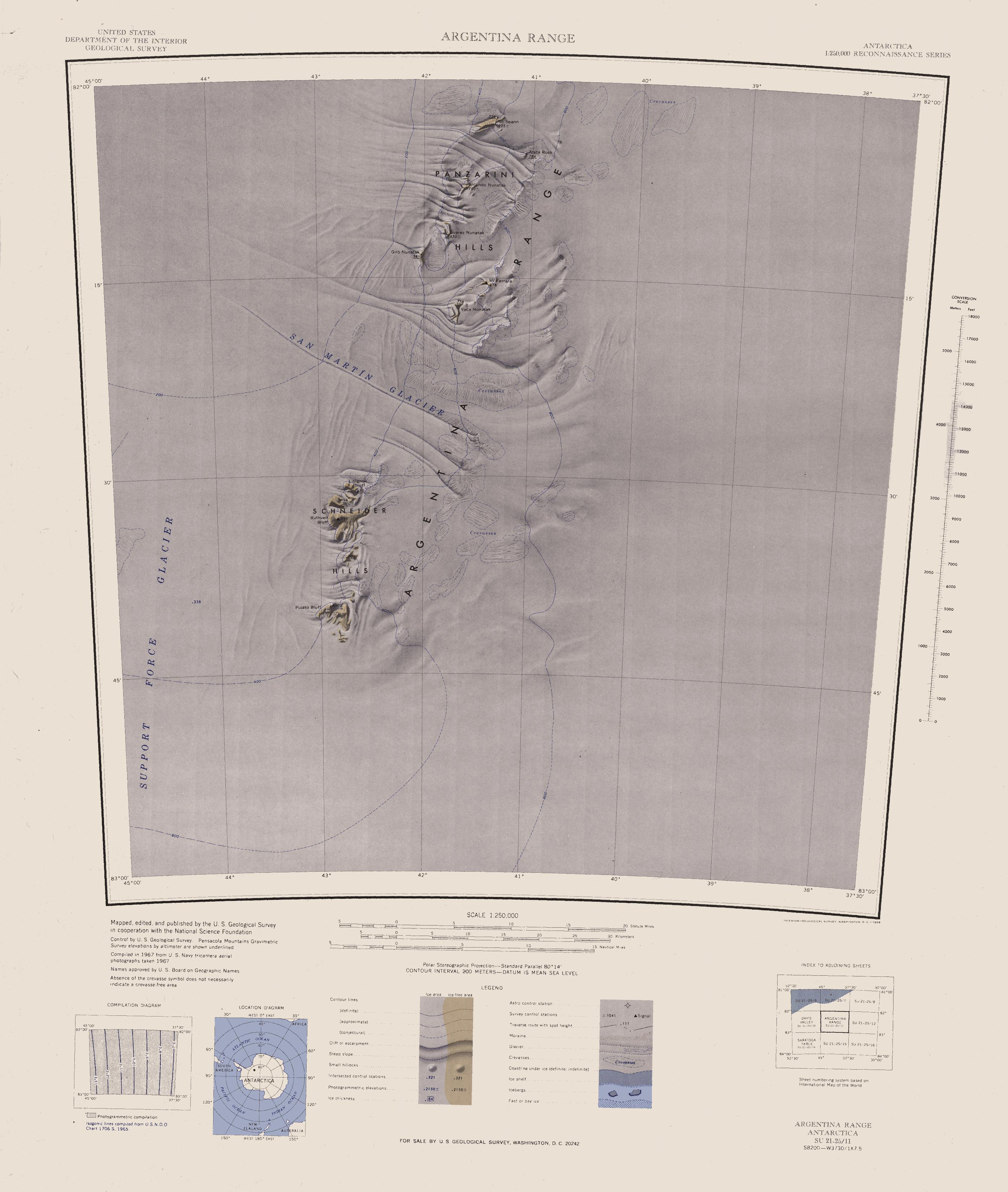
Argentina Range
- Cordiner Peaks (82°48′S 53°30′W), a group of peaks extending over an area of 6 nautical miles (11 km; 6.9 mi) standing 8 nautical miles (15 km; 9.2 mi) southwest of Dufek Massif in the northern part of the Pensacola Mountains.
- Dufek Massif (82°36′S 52°30′W), a rugged, largely snow-covered massif 27 nautical miles (50 km; 31 mi) long, standing west of the Forrestal Range in the northern part of the Pensacola Mountains.
- Forrestal Range (83°00′S 049°30′W), a largely snow-covered mountain range, about 65 nautical miles (120 km; 75 mi) long, standing east of Dufek Massif and the Neptune Range in the Pensacola Mountains.
- Argentina Range (82°20′S 042°00′W), a range of rock peaks and bluffs, 42 nautical miles (78 km; 48 mi) long, lying 35 nautical miles (65 km; 40 mi) east of the northern part of Forrestal Range in the northeastern portion of the Pensacola Mountains.

== Sources ==
- Alberts, Fred G., ed. (1995), Geographic Names of the Antarctic (PDF) (2 ed.), United States Board on Geographic Names This article incorporates public domain material from websites or documents of the United States Board on Geographic Names.
- Laird, M.G. (1991), Thomson, M.R.A.; Crame, J.A.; Thomson, J.W. (eds.), Lower-mid-Palaeozoic sedimentation and tectonic patterns on the palaeo-Pacific margin of Antarctica, in Geological Evolution of Antarctica, Cambridge: Cambridge University Press, p. 179, ISBN 9780521372664
- This article incorporates public domain material from websites or documents of the United States Geological Survey.
