= List of University of Hull people =

This is a list of notable people associated with the University of Hull, including alumni, academics, and staff.

== Notable academics ==
- Sir Hilary Beckles (born 1955) – Barbadian academic and historian, Vice-Chancellor of the University of the West Indies
- Richard Beeman – American history (1976–77)
- Malcolm Bradbury – Adult education (1959–61), novelist and academic
- Jacob Bronowski – mathematics (1934–42)
- Trevor Burnard - historian and director of the Wilberforce Institute for the Study of Slavery and Emancipation
- Edwin A. Dawes – Reckitt Chair in Biochemistry (1963–1990), magic historian
- Arthur Geoffrey Dickens – historian on The English Reformation (1949–1962)
- Richard A. Flavell – molecular biologist, and professor of immunobiology
- George William Gray FRS (also a Hull alumnus, PhD 1953) – instrumental in developing the materials which made liquid crystal displays possible (1946–1990), awarded Kyoto Prize and Leverhulme Medal of the Royal Society
- Brad K. Gibson – Australian-Canadian professor of Astrophysics (2015-2024)
- Sir Alister Hardy FRS – Marine biologist, the first Professor of Zoology at the University College of Hull (1928–1942)
- Clive Head – artist (1990–2000)
- Richard Hoggart – Staff Tutor in Adult Education (1946–1959), influential British academic and public intellectual
- Terence Wilmot Hutchison – Lecturer in Economics (1946–1947), influential as an economic methodologist and as a historian of economic thought
- Guido Imbens-Professor of Econometrics at Stanford University and fellow of the Econometric Society
- Ludwig Lachmann – German economist and member of the Austrian School of economics (1943–1948)
- Christian Langton – developed an early detection system for osteoporosis utilising ultrasonic waves
- Philip Larkin – University Librarian (1955–1985), poet, jazz critic and novelist
- Angela Leighton – Professor of English, literary scholar and poet
- Kathleen Lennon – Ferens Chair in Philosophy (2009–2025), feminist philosopher
- Sir Leslie Martin – Head of Architecture (1934–?), leading architect and designer of the Royal Festival Hall
- Rob Miles – computer scientist, Microsoft MVP
- Sir Andrew Motion – Lecturer in English (1976–1980), Poet Laureate (1999–2009)
- Bernhard Neumann – Lecturer in Mathematics (1946–1948), leading figure in group theory
- Hanna Neumann – Lecturer in Mathematics (1946–1958)
- Philip Norton, Baron Norton of Louth – professor of politics
- Stuart Palmer – responsible for breakthroughs in the field of ultrasound bone densitometry
- Michael Paraskos – writer and anarchist art historian (1994–2001)
- Bhikhu Parekh, Baron Parekh – professor of politics, specialist on the theory of multiculturalism (1964–2000)
- Daniel Parsons – professor of sedimentology
- Barrie Pettman, lecturer in Industrial Relations in the Department of Social Administration; publisher and philanthropist.
- John Guest Phillips FRS – endocrinologist and gerontologist, Professor of Zoology at Hull (1967–1979), Vice Chancellor of Loughborough University (1986–1987).
- Eric Roll, Baron Roll of Ipsden – Professor of Economics and Commerce (1935–1946), economist, civil servant and banker
- John Saville – Professor of History, marxist historian
- David Starkey – maritime historian (1994–)
- Richard Swinburne – Christian philosopher of religion, later professor of philosophy at University of Oxford
- Victor Terence King – Emeritus professor of Southeast Asian studies, University of Leeds and distinguished professor of Borneo Studies, Universiti Brunei Darussalam

== Notable alumni ==
- Michael Aldrich - online shopping pioneer, innovator, and entrepreneur (BA, 1962)
- Assem Allam - businessman and owner of Hull City football club
- Robert Allison – Vice-Chancellor and President, Loughborough University
- Faisal al-Qassem – Television personality
- Daniel Francis Annan – former Appeal Court Judge, member of the Provisional National Defence Council and Speaker of the Parliament of Ghana (1993–2001)
- Fred Apaloo, Chief Justice of Ghana (1977–1986) and later Kenya (1993–95)
- Koop Arponen – Finnish singer, winner of the fourth series of "Idols", a popular Finnish reality television talent show (Scarborough Campus)
- Len Arran, songwriter, composer
- Tony Badger – historian and Master of Clare College, Cambridge, 2003–14 (PhD American Studies 1974)
- Ronald Hugh Barker - a physicist, mathematician and pioneer in digital control engineering who invented Barker code (Bsc 1938)
- Erkin Bairam – Professor of Economics at the University of Otago (1991–2001)
- Lucy Beaumont – actor, writer, and stand-up comedian
- Georges Bégué MC – Special Operations Executive agent during World War II. Devised a system of coded communications via Radio Londres
- Ed Bicknell manager of Dire Straits (Social Science, 1969)
- Dan Billany – novelist
- Tracy Borman – historian and joint Chief Curator of Historic Royal Palaces (History, 1990–1997)
- Ana Brnabić – the Prime Minister of Serbia
- Colin Challen – Labour politician (BA, philosophy, 1983)
- Mark Chapman – BBC Radio 5 Live sports presenter
- Mark Charnock – actor and star of ITV soap opera Emmerdale
- Simon Cheshire – children's writer
- Neil Codling – keyboard player of the band Suede
- Richard Corbett – Member of the European Parliament for Yorkshire & Humber, Leader of Labour MEPs
- Patrick Cormack – Conservative politician, historian and journalist (BA 1961)
- Stuart Cosgrove – journalist, broadcaster and television executive (BA Drama and English 1974)
- Peter Cowgill – Executive Chairman of JD Sports
- Neil Coyle – Labour politician
- Tracey Crouch – Conservative politician
- Stan Cullimore – musician with The Housemartins (BSc, Maths, 1984)
- Alexander Apeatu Aboagye da Costa – Ghanaian politician
- Jeremy Darroch – Chief Executive of Sky
- Dehenna Davison – Conservative politician, MP for Bishop Auckland
- Richard Douglas – Director General and chief operating officer, Department of Health (BA, English, 1978)
- Douglas Dunn – Poet
- Rae Earl – author and broadcaster
- Robert Edric – English novelist
- Louise Ellman – Labour politician (BA Sociology and History, 1967)
- Robert Elstone – Chief Executive of Everton F.C.
- Barry Everitt – Professor of Neuroscience, Master of Downing College, University of Cambridge
- John Fallon – British business executive. He serves as the chief executive officer of Pearson PLC
- Frank Field – Labour politician
- Mark Fisher – cultural theorist, writer, critic, and former lecturer at Goldsmiths
- Anthony Forster – Vice-Chancellor of the University of Essex
- Stephen Gallagher – novelist, screenwriter
- Tony Galvin – former Tottenham Hotspur and Republic of Ireland footballer studied Russian and Politics
- Hazel Genn – Professor of Socio-Legal Studies at University College London
- Dennis Gibson – academic, Chancellor of the Royal Melbourne Institute of Technology in Australia (BSc, 1963)
- Anthony Giddens – sociologist, government advisor, and writer; former director of the LSE
- Dame Sarah Gilbert – Saïd Professor of Vaccinology at the University of Oxford and Project Lead on the Oxford–AstraZeneca COVID-19 vaccine
- Helen Grant – Conservative Party politician
- Sarah Greene – actor and television presenter
- Matt Haig – Novelist and journalist
- Brenda Hale, Baroness Hale of Richmond – judge and President of the Supreme Court of the United Kingdom
- Graeme Hall – dog trainer, TV presenter and author
- David Hanson – Labour Party politician
- Stewart Harcourt - screenwriter
- Nick Hardwick – former Her Majesty's Chief Inspector of Prisons
- Maidin Hashim – Bruneian diplomat (BSc, 1976)
- Roy Hattersley – former Secretary of State for Prices and Consumer Protection and Deputy Leader of the Labour Party
- Ayesha Hazarika – broadcaster, journalist and political commentator, and former political adviser
- Antony Higginbotham – Conservative politician
- Mark C. Hunter – naval historian
- Peter Kenny – Voice-over artist, actor, singer and designer
- Muhtar Kent – Turkish businessman and executive of the Coca-Cola Company
- Yahya Al Khusaibi – Undersecretary of the Ministry of Legal Affairs of the Sultanate of Oman
- Monika Kinley – art dealer, collector and curator
- Jonathan Kydd – Son of actor Sam Kydd. Actor, singer, voice over artist. Famous as the voice of Paddington Bear on TV
- Allan Levy QC – Barrister and children's advocate; chairman of the Pindown Inquiry
- Dorothy Lightbourne – Attorney General of Jamaica
- Sally Lindsay – actress
- Nicholas Liverpool (1960) – former President of Dominica
- Jason Lo – Malaysian music artist, music producer, DJ and entrepreneur
- Christine Loh – Hong Kong politician
- Magid Magid – politician, activist, and former Lord Mayor of Sheffield
- Maitha Al Mahrouqi – Oman's Undersecretary for Tourism
- John McCarthy – journalist
- Roger McGough – poet and presenter
- Judith McKenna – businesswoman and CEO of Walmart international division
- Kevin McNamara – Politician and MP for a number of Hull constituencies, Shadow Secretary of State for Northern Ireland
- Rosie Millard – journalist, columnist, and broadcaster
- Anthony Minghella – film director
- Simon Minter (born 1992), YouTuber, better known as Miniminter
- Eluned Morgan – (Baroness Morgan of Ely), Welsh politician and First Minister of Wales
- Juliet Morris (aka Julie) – broadcaster
- Chris Mullin – Labour politician, author, and journalist
- Jenni Murray – broadcaster and writer, host of BBC Woman's Hour
- Joanna Nadin – author
- Catherine O'Brien – former Senior lecturer in Film studies and lecturer at Kingston University, London
- Wale Ojo – actor and director (Drama, 1986)
- Keat Gin Ooi – academician and historian
- Ada Osakwe – economist, entrepreneur and corporate executive
- Tom Paulin – poet, and lecturer at The University of Oxford
- Genesis P-Orridge – Throbbing Gristle musician initially studied philosophy in 1968
- Greg Pope – former Labour politician
- Graham Potter – professional football manager
- John Prescott – former Deputy Prime Minister
- Sinéad Quinn – contestant in the first series of BBC's Fame Academy. (Scarborough Campus)
- Jonathan Raban – fiction and travel writer, including "Hunting Mister Heartbreak" and "Bad Land: An American Romance"
- Ken Reid – journalist and political editor at Ulster TV
- Sian Reese-Williams – actor and star of ITV soap opera Emmerdale
- Simon Rushton – academic
- Harriet Scott - radio broadcaster
- Kevin Shinkwin, Baron Shinkwin – House of Lords
- Nancy Shukri – Malaysian politician
- The Silkie – 1960s folk band, all members of the band attended the university
- Keith Simpson – Member of Parliament for Broadland
- Malcolm Sinclair, actor
- Josephine Sinyo – Kenyan lawyer, politician and disability rights activist
- Jimmy Smith – Guitarist for the indie rock band, Foals
- Mike Stock – record producer
- Philip Sugden – historian
- Chris Tame – libertarian political activist and founder and Director of the Libertarian Alliance
- Tracey Thorn – Singer, songwriter and one half of Everything But The Girl
- Jon Trickett MP – Labour Politician
- Sam Troughton – actor, grandson of Doctor Who actor Patrick Troughton
- Karl Turner – MP and politician
- Wouter Van Besien – Belgian politician of the green party Groen!.
- Ben Watt – Musician, songwriter and one half of Everything But The Girl
- Tom Watson, Baron Watson of Wyre Forest – Deputy Leader of the Labour Party 2015–2019
- Jennifer Wilby – Director of the Centre for Systems Studies, University of Hull
- Dame Rosie Winterton MP – Labour Party politician (BA History, 1979)

== Other notable people ==
- Baron Robert Armstrong of Ilminster – former civil servant, and Chancellor (1994–2006)
- Robert Blackburn – aviation pioneer, and commemorated by the Robert Blackburn building
- Baroness Virginia Bottomley of Nettlestone – former Conservative politician, and Chancellor (2006–)
- James William Bruce – mathematics academic, and deputy Vice-Chancellor (2004–2009)
- Lord Henry Cohen – Chancellor (1970–1977)
- Stanley R Dennison – Economist, and Vice-Chancellor (1972–1979)
- David Dilks – Historian, and Vice-Chancellor (1991–1999)
- David Drewry – geophysicist, and Vice-Chancellor (1999–2009)
- Thomas Ferens – Liberal politician, philanthropist
- Brynmor Jones – science academic, and Vice-Chancellor (1956–1972)
- Professor Susan Lea – health academic, and Vice-Chancellor (2017–)
- Sir Roy Marshall – academic lawyer, and Vice-Chancellor (1979–1985)
- Lord Middleton – first Chancellor (1954–1969)
- Arthur Eustace Morgan – first Principal of University College (1926–1935)
- John H Nicholson – academic, Principal of University College (1935–1954), followed by first Vice-Chancellor (1954–1956)
- Calie Pistorius – Engineering academic, and Vice-Chancellor (2009–2017)
- William Taylor – English academic, and Vice-Chancellor (1985–1991)
- John Venn – Hull born mathematician, and commemorated by the Venn building
- Baron Richard Wilberforce, former Judge and Chancellor (1978–1994)
