= Victor Terence King =

British academic (born 1949)

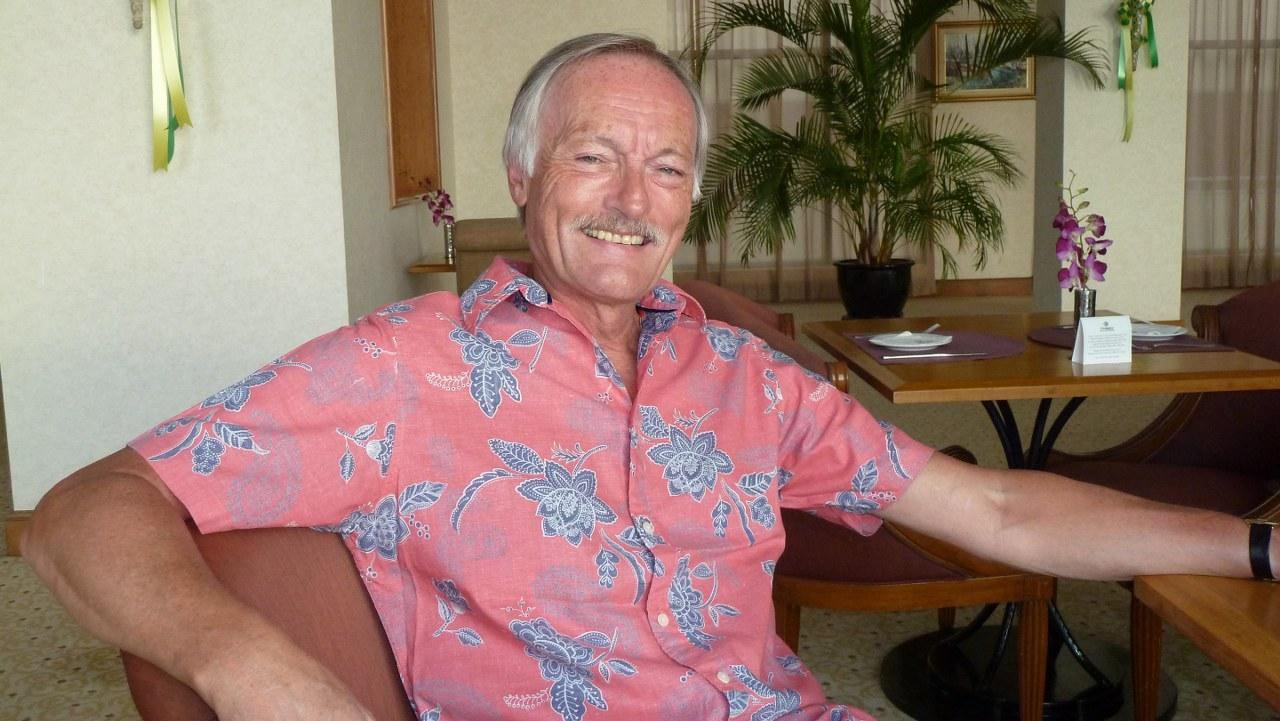
- Born: 26 January 1949 (age 77); Gorleston-on-Sea, England, UK
- Citizenship: British
- Known for: Anthropology and sociology of Southeast Asia
- Spouse: Judith Jane King

Academic background
- Education: University of Hull; SOAS University of London
- Doctoral advisor: Mervyn Aubrey Jaspan

Academic work
- Discipline: Anthropology; Sociology; Geography
- Institutions: University of Hull; University of Leeds

Victor Terence King (born 26 January 1949) is a British academic and Emeritus Professor of Southeast Asian Studies, University of Leeds and Visiting Professor of Borneo Studies, Institute of Asian Studies, Universiti Brunei Darussalam. King is listed as one of the University of Hull's Notable academics at List of University of Hull people.

== Education ==
King holds a BA in Geography and Sociology, University of Hull (1970), an MA (with distinction), Area Studies (Anthropology, Geography, Indonesian Language), SOAS University of London (1971) and a PhD in Social Anthropology, University of Hull (1980).

== Professional life ==
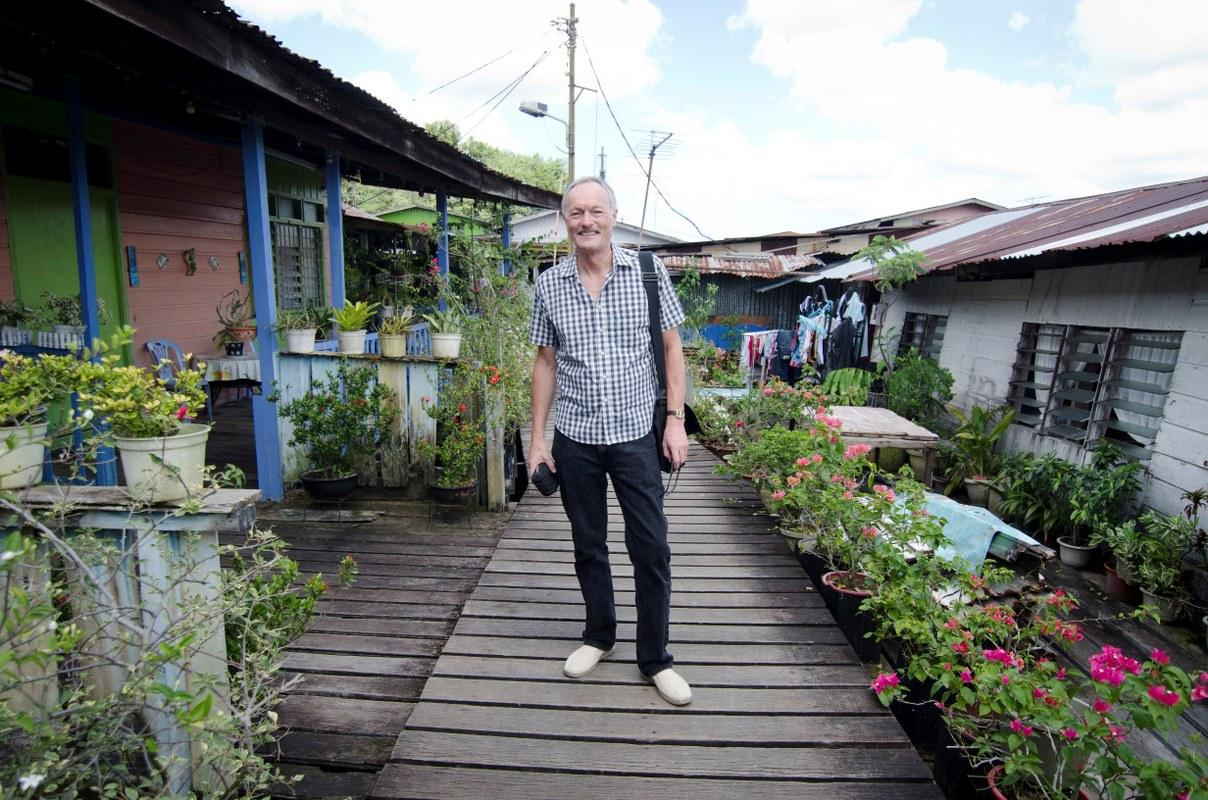
Subject during fieldwork in Brunei

King's area of research in the Anthropology and sociology of Southeast Asia focuses on Indonesia and Malaysia. He studies kinship and social organisation; culture and ethnic identities; environmental issues, climate change and forest clearance in Borneo; tourism and development; UNESCO World Heritage Sites; ethnographic museum and photographic collections; and the problems of defining Southeast Asia as a region. With Dr Monica Janowski, now Curator, he was instrumental in re-opening the Southeast Asian Museum at the University of Hull in 2024.

He contributed to three national Research Assessment Exercises for the Higher Education Funding Council for England: Asian Studies Panel Member (1992); deputy chair, Asian Studies (1995–1996); chair, Asian Studies Sub-Panel, and Member, Area Studies Panel (2005–2008). King has been Editor-in-Chief of Suvannabhumi: Multidisciplinary Journal of Southeast Asian Studies since 2019 and is a member of the advisory board of the Journal of Humanities and Social Science Research (JHSSR). King serves on the following editorial boards: South East Asia Research; TRaNS: Trans-Regional and National Studies of Southeast Asia; as an Editorial Advisor on East Asia: An International Quarterly; and as a member of the International Editorial Board of the International Journal of Asia Pacific Studies. He serves as an editorial board member of the Asia in Transition book series and as Editor of The Modern Anthropology of Southeast Asia book series. He is Senior Editorial Advisor, Regional Center for Social Science and Sustainable Development, Chiang Mai University Press. He is a Fellow of the Royal Society of Arts. The Universiti Brunei Darussalam has established an annual The Professor Victor T. King Prize in Borneo Studies, for the best final year undergraduate dissertation.

King has acted as Honorary Secretary (1976–1983), Treasurer (1988–1992) and Chair (2007–2010) of the Association of South-East Asian Studies in the United Kingdom (ASEASUK). and was a member (1979–1983, 2007–2010) of the United Kingdom Coordinating Council of Area Studies Associations (UKCASA). He served (1993–1998) on the Economic and Social Research Council and was involved in the development of Southeast Asian Studies in the British Academy acting as Honorary Secretary (1982–1986) of the British Academy and British Council funded British Institute in South-East Asia (BISEA) (which is distinct from the British Chambers of Commerce funded BiSEA) and later as Secretary (1986–1998) and Chair (1998–2002). The following book was published in his honour as a leading scholar in the field of Southeast Asian Studies, by Ooi, KG (2020) Borneo and Sulawesi: Indigenous Peoples, Empires and Area Studies Routledge, London and New York ISBN 9781138365667.

== Academic posts ==
Following a career at the University of Hull where he was a Lecturer then a Senior Lecturer in South-East Asian Sociology at Hull (1973–1988) before promotion to Professor of South East Asian Studies (1988 to 2005) during which time he served as Dean of the School of Social and Political Sciences (1993–1996) and Pro-Vice-Chancellor (1998–2000) and as Director of Southeast Asian Studies at Hull (1988–1993, 1997–1998, 2002–2005) and Director of the university's Graduate School (2002–2005). He moved to the University of Leeds where he was Professor of South East Asian Studies and served as Executive Director of the White Rose East Asia Centre, in partnership with the University of Sheffield, funded by the Higher Education Funding Council for England (HEFCE), the Economic and Social Research Council (ESRC) and the Arts and Humanities Research Council (AHRC) (2006–2012).

He retired in 2012 as emeritus Professor in the School of Languages, Cultures and Societies and Honorary Fellow in South East Asian Studies (2012–2017), University of Leeds and has since held posts at Universiti Brunei Darussalam in the Institute of Asian Studies, as Eminent Visiting Professor (2012–2013), Distinguished Visiting Fellow, (2014–2016), the inaugural Professor of Borneo Studies (2017–2022). He was Distinguished Professor (2022–2025) and has been visiting professor in the Institute of Asian Studies since 2025. He has held Research Fellowships at the Rijksmuseum voor Volkenkunde, KITLV/Royal Netherlands Institute of Southeast Asian and Caribbean Studies, Chiang Mai University, SOAS University of London, University of Leeds and Busan University of Foreign Studies.

== Bibliography ==
- King VT (1978) Essays on Borneo Societies Oxford University Press for the University of Hull, Oxford ISBN 0197134343
- Avé JB, King VT, De Wit, JGW (1983) West Kalimantan: A Bibliography Foris Publications Holland/USA, Dordrecht and Cinnaminson, Koninklijk Instituut voor Taal, Land- en Volkenkunde, Bibliographical Series 13 ISBN 9067650412
- King VT (1985) The Maloh of West Kalimantan An Ethnographic Study of Social Inequality and Social Change among an Indonesian Borneo People Series: Verhandelingen van het Koninklijk Instituut voor Taal-, Land- en Volkenkunde, Volume: 108, Foris Publications, Dordrecht-Holland ISBN 906765065X
- Ave JB, King VT (1986) Borneo: Oerwoud in Ondergang. Culturen op Drift Rijksmuseum voor Volkenkunde, Leiden ISBN 9071310272
- Avé JB, King VT (1986) People of the Weeping Forest: Tradition and Change in Borneo National Museum of Ethnology, Leiden ISBN 9071310280
- Bassett DK, King VT (Eds) (1986) Britain and South-East Asia University of Hull, Centre for South-East Asian Studies, Occasional Paper No 13 ISBN 0859585492
- King VT (Ed) (1989) HF Tillema. A Journey among the Peoples of Central Borneo in Word and Picture Oxford University Press, Singapore ISBN 0195889363
- King VT, Parnwell M (Eds) (1990) Margins and Minorities: The Peripheral Areas and Peoples of Malaysia Hull University Press, Hull ISBN 0859584909
- King VT (1990) Between West and East: Policy and Practice in South-East Asian Studies in Britain Hull University Press, Hull ISBN 0859584917
- Heinz WS, Pfennig W, King VT (Eds) (1990) The Military in Politics: Southeast Asian Experiences Hull University, Centre for South-East Asian Studies ISBN 0859585786
- King VT (1991) Introduction, Carl Lumholtz, Through Central Borneo Oxford University Press, Singapore ISBN 9781725781085
- King VT (Compiler) (1992) A Register of Current United Kingdom Research on Maritime South-East Asia: Malaysia, Singapore, Indonesia and Brunei Darussalam University of Hull for the Association of South-East Asian Studies in the United Kingdom ISBN 0859585859
- King VT (1992) The Best of Borneo Travel Oxford University Press, Kuala Lumpur ISBN 9780195886030
- King VT, Nazaruddin MJ (Eds) (1992) Issues in Rural Development in Malaysia Dewan Bahasa dan Pustaka, Kuala Lumpur ISBN 9836229477
- King VT, Nazaruddin MJ (Eds) (1992) Isu-Isu Pembangunan Luar Bandar di Malaysia Dewan Bahasa dan Pustaka, Kuala Lumpur ISBN 9836230092
- King VT (Ed) (1992) The Rejang of Southern Sumatra University of Hull, Centre for South-East Asian Studies ISBN 0859585867
- King VT (1993) The Peoples of Borneo (The Peoples of South-East Asia and the Pacific) Wiley-Blackwell, London ISBN 9780631172215
- King VT (1993) Tourism in Borneo Borneo Research Council, Phillips, Maine, Borneo Research Council Proceedings ISBN 096295683X
- Hitchcock M, King VT, Parnwell MJG (Eds) (1993) Tourism in South-East Asia Routledge, London and New York ISBN 0415079292
- King VT (Ed) (1995) Explorers of South-East Asia: Six Lives Oxford University Press, Kuala Lumpur ISBN 9789676530776
- King VT, Horton AVM (Eds) (1995) From Buckfast to Borneo: Essays Presented to Father Robert Nicholl on the 85th Anniversary of his Birth 27 March 1995 Sarawak Literary Society, Ampang Press Sdn Bhd, Kuala Lumpur ISBN 9839115049
- King VT (1996) Planning for Agrarian Change: Hydro-electric Power, Resettlement and Iban Swidden Cultivators in Sarawak East Malaysia Occasional Paper No 11, University of Hull: Centre for South-East Asian Studies ISBN 0859585441
- King VT (1997) The Simple Guide to Malaysia: Customs and Etiquette: Series 1: Customs & Etiquette Simple Guides, Cologne ISBN 9781860340116
- Hitchcock, M, King VT (Eds) (1997) Images of Malay-Indonesian Identity Oxford University Press, Kuala Lumpur ISBN 9789835600265
- King VT (1998) Environmental Challenges in South-East Asia Routledge, London ISBN 9780700706150
- King VT (1999) Anthropology and Development in South-East Asia: Theory and Practice (South-East Asian Social Science Monographs) Oxford University Press, Kuala Lumpur ISBN 9835600414
- King VT (1999) Moving Pictures: More Borneo Travel Oxford University Press, Shah Alam, Selangor, Malaysia ISBN 9835600554
- King VT (Ed) (1999) Rural Development and Social Science Research: Case Studies from Borneo Borneo Research Council, Phillips, Maine, Borneo Research Council Proceedings No 6 ISBN 0962956899
- Khng P, King VT (2001) Register of South-East Asianists in the United Kingdom, British Academy Committee for South-East Asian Studies/Association of South-East Asian Studies University of Hull ISBN 090312212X
- King VT, Wilder WD (2002) The modern anthropology of South-East Asia: an introduction Routledge, London ISBN 9780415297516
- Jawan JA, King VT (2004) Ethnicity and Electoral Politics in Sarawak Bangi, Penerbit Universiti Kebangsaan Malaysia ISBN 9679426793
- King VT (2005) Defining Southeast Asia and the Crisis in Area Studies: Personal Reflections on a Region Lund University, Centre for East and South-East Asian Studies, Working Paper No 13 ISBN 9197572624
- King VT (2007) Customs & Etiquette of Malaysia Bravo Ltd, London, Simple Guides ISBN 9781857333985
- Hitchcock M, King VT, Parnwell M (Eds) (2008) Tourism in Southeast Asia: challenges and new directions Silkworm Books, Chiang Mai ISBN 9788776940348
- King VT (2008) Malaysia - Culture Smart! The Essential Guide to Customs & Culture Culture Smart, London ISBN 9781787022768
- King VT (2008) The Sociology of Southeast Asia: Transformations in a Developing Region NIAS Press, Copenhagen ISBN 9788791114601
- Hitchcock M, King VT, Parnwell M (Eds) (2009) Tourism in Southeast Asia: Challenges and New Directions Silkworm Books, Chiang Mai; NIAS Press, Copenhagen ISBN 9788776940348
- King VT (2008) Cultuur Bewust! Malëisië. Een leidraad voor gewoonten en etiquette Uitgeverij Elmar, Delft ISBN 9789038918617
- Hitchcock M, King VT, Parnwell M (Eds) (2010) Heritage Tourism in Southeast Asia Copenhagen: NIAS Press ISBN 9788776940591
- King VT (2012) Culture and Identity: Some Borneo Comparisons Universiti Brunei Darussalam, Institute of Asian Studies, Working Paper No 1 ISBN 9789991712505
- King VT (2013) UNESCO in Southeast Asia: World Heritage in Comparative Perspective Working Paper No 4. Universiti Brunei Darussalam, Institute of Asian Sian Studies ISBN 9789991712642
- King VT (2013) Kalimantan Tempo Doeloe Komunitas Bambu, Depok ISBN 9786029402339
- Park SW, King VT (Eds) (2013) The Historical Construction of Southeast Asian Studies: Korea and Beyond ISEAS Publishing, Singapore ISBN 9789814414593
- King VT (Ed) (2013) Environmental Challenges in South-East Asia (NIAS Man and Nature in Asia) (1st edition) Routledge, London ISBN 9781138993495
- King VT, Wilder WD (2012) Antropologi Modern Asia Tenggara Sebuah Pengantar Kreasi Wacana, Jakarta ISBN 9786029020274
- King VT (2013) Borneo and Beyond: Reflections on Borneo Studies, Anthropology and the Social Sciences Universiti Brunei Darussalam, Institute of Asian Studies, Working Paper No 3 ISBN 9789811006715
- Porananond, P, King VT (Eds) (2014) Rethinking Asian Tourism: Culture, Encounters and Local Response Cambridge Scholars Publishing, Newcastle upon Tyne ISBN 9781443869720
- King VT (Ed) (2013) Environmental Challenges in South-East Asia (NIAS Man and Nature in Asia) (1st edition) Routledge, London ISBN 9781138993495
- King VT (2015) UNESCO in Southeast Asia: World Heritage Sites in Comparative Perspective: 55 (NIAS Studies in Asian Topics) Silkworm Books, Chiang Mai ISBN 8776941744
- Porananond, P, King VT (Eds) (2016) Tourism and Monarchy in Southeast Asia Cambridge Scholars Publishing, Newcastle upon Tyne ISBN 9781443899499
- Carnegie PJ, King VT, Zawawi I (Eds) (2016) Human Insecurities in Southeast Asia Springer Science+Business Media, Singapore ISBN 9789811022449
- King VT, Zawawi I, Hassan, NH (Eds) (2017) Borneo Studies in History, Society and Culture Springer Science+Business Media, Singapore ISBN 9789811006715
- de Lima IB, King VT (Eds) (2018) Tourism and Ethnodevelopment:Inclusion, Empowerment and Self-determination Routledge, London ISBN 9780367362294
- Harrison D, King VT, Eades JS (Eds) (2018) Tourism in East and Southeast Asia: Critical Concepts in Asian Studies Routledge, London and New York (4 volumes) ISBN 9780815360377
- Hitchcock M, King VT, Parnwell MJG (Eds) (2019) Tourism in South-East Asia: Challenges and New Directions Routledge, London and New York, Routledge Library Editions Volume 32 ISBN 9780824832995
- Filho WL, King VT, de Lima IB (Eds) (2020) Indigenous Amazonia, Regional Development and Territorial Dynamics Springer Nature Switzerland AG, Cham Switzerland ISBN 9783030291525
- King VT, Wilder WD (2020) The Modern Anthropology of South-East Asia: An Introduction Routledge, London ISBN 9780415297523
- King VT (2021) Culture Smart. Malaysia: The Essential Guide to Customs & Etiquette Kuperard, London ISBN 9781787022768
- King VT, Druce SC (Eds) (2021) Continuity and Change in Brunei Darussalam Routledge, London ISBN 9780429664250
- Zawawi I, Richards R, King VT (Eds.) (2021) Discourses, Agency and Identity in Malaysia Springer, Berlin ISBN 9789813345676
- Druce SC, King VT (Eds.) (2021) Origins, History and Social Structure in Brunei Darussalam Routledge, London ISBN 9781000214703
- Jammes J, King, VT (2021) Fieldwork and the Self: Changing Research Styles in Southeast Asia: 12 (Asia in Transition, 12) Springer, Berlin ISBN 9811624372
- Ooi KG, King VT (Eds) (2023) Routledge Handbook of Contemporary Brunei Routledge, London ISBN 9780367819149
- Ooi KG, King VT (2026) The Handbook of Southeast Asian Studies: Pioneers and Critical Thinkers (Handbooks in Asian Studies) Springer, Berlin ISBN 9789819955336
