= Human Rights in Thailand (book) =

2018 non-fiction book by Don F. Selby

- Author: Don F. Selby
- Publisher: University of Pennsylvania Press
- Publication date: 2018

Human Rights in Thailand is a nonfiction book by Don F. Selby. It was published in 2018 by the University of Pennsylvania Press as part of their Pennsylvania Studies in Human Rights series.

== General references ==
- Nathan, Andrew J. (2018). "Review of Human Rights in Thailand". Foreign Affairs. 97 (6): 226–226. ISSN 0015-7120.
- Phatharathananunth, Somchai (2019). "Review of Human rights in Thailand". Journal of Southeast Asian Studies. 50 (2): 305–306. ISSN 0022-4634.
- Zackari, Karin H. (2019). "Review of Human rights in Thailand". South East Asia Research. 27 (2): 196–197. ISSN 0967-828X.
