= Willi Soukop =

Austrian sculptor (1907–1995)

- Born: Wilhelm Joseph Soukop; 5 January 1907; Vienna, Austria
- Died: 8 February 1995 (aged 88); Glasgow, Scotland
- Occupation: Sculptor

Willi Soukop RA (5 January 1907 – 8 February 1995) was a sculptor, member of the Royal Academy and early teacher of Elisabeth Frink. Soukop's work is prominently on display at Hull University in front of the Brynmor Jones Library. Two external Willi Soukop bas-relief sculptures, one of an owl and the other of a human figure signifying the light of knowledge, are located over the main entrance in the older part.

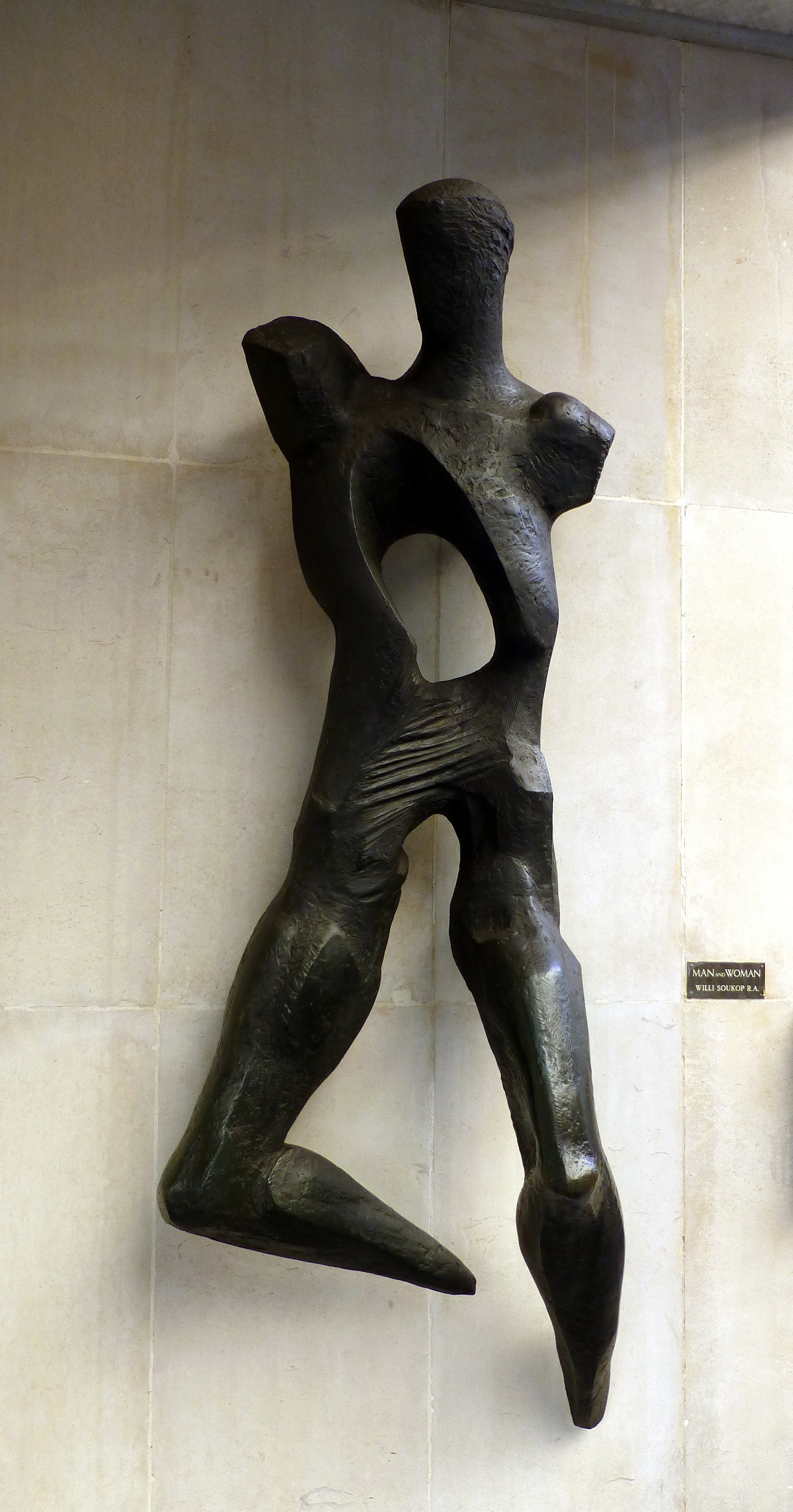
Willi Soukop Sculpture outside Albany House

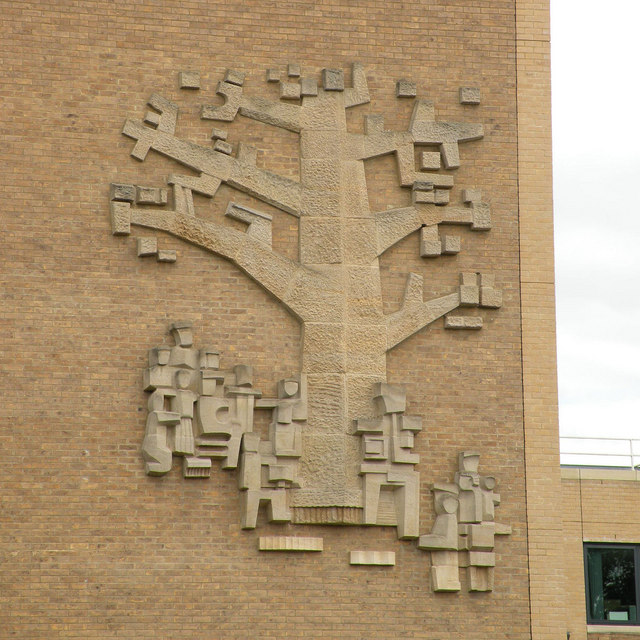
Sculpture at Kett's Oak (1962–63)

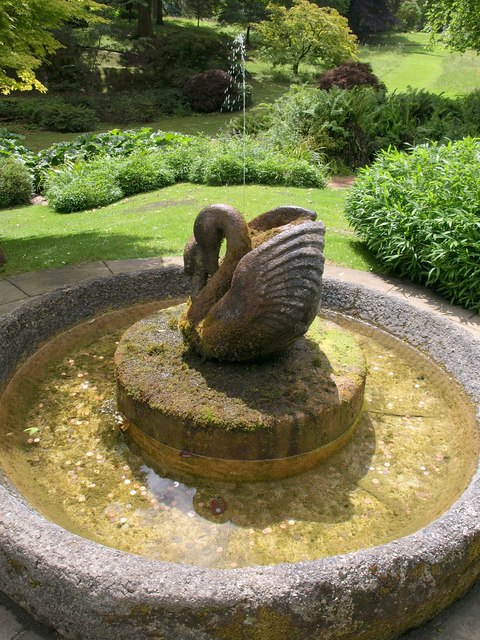
Swan Fountain, Dartington Hall, 1950

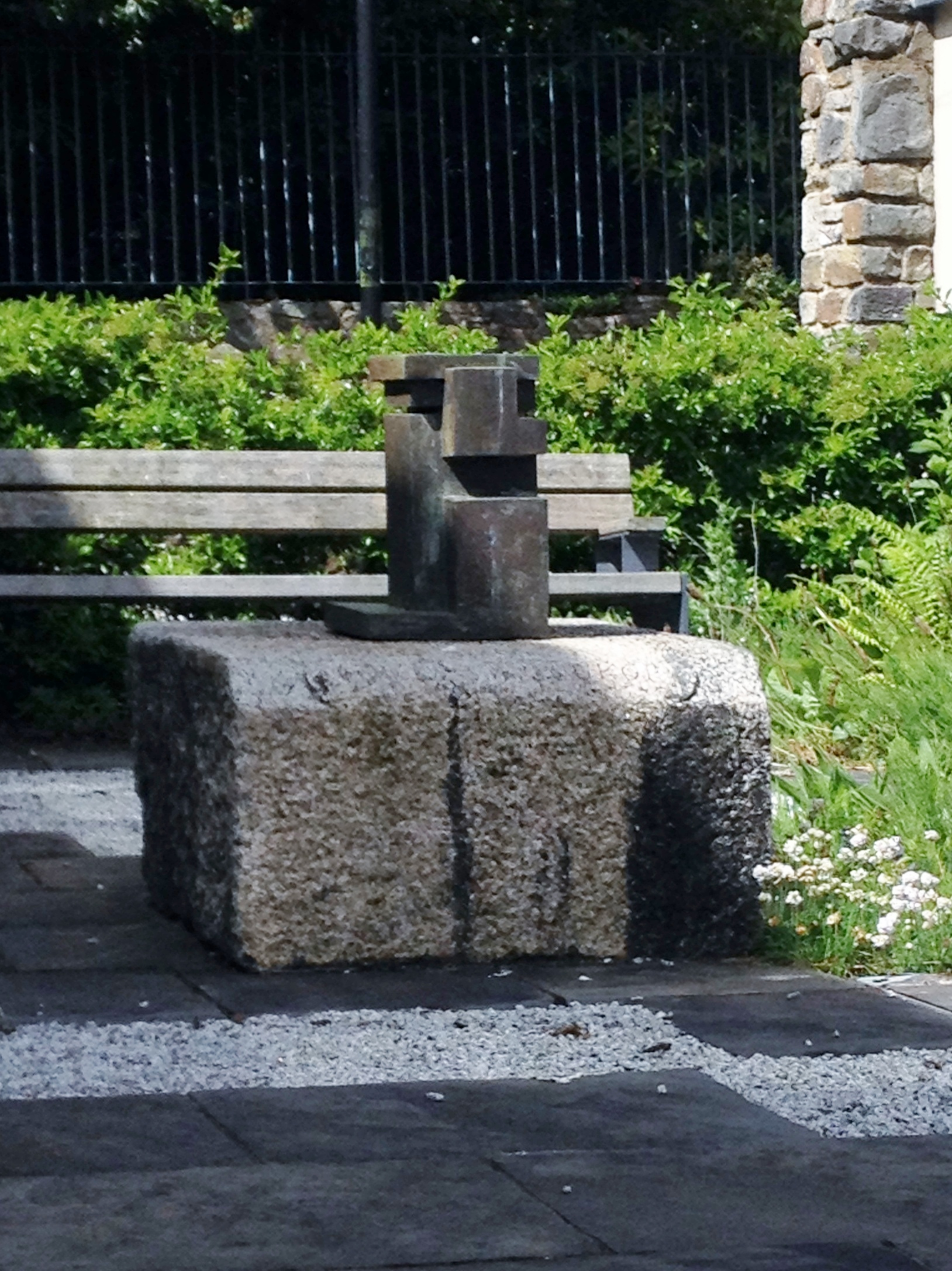
Sculpture at Swansea University

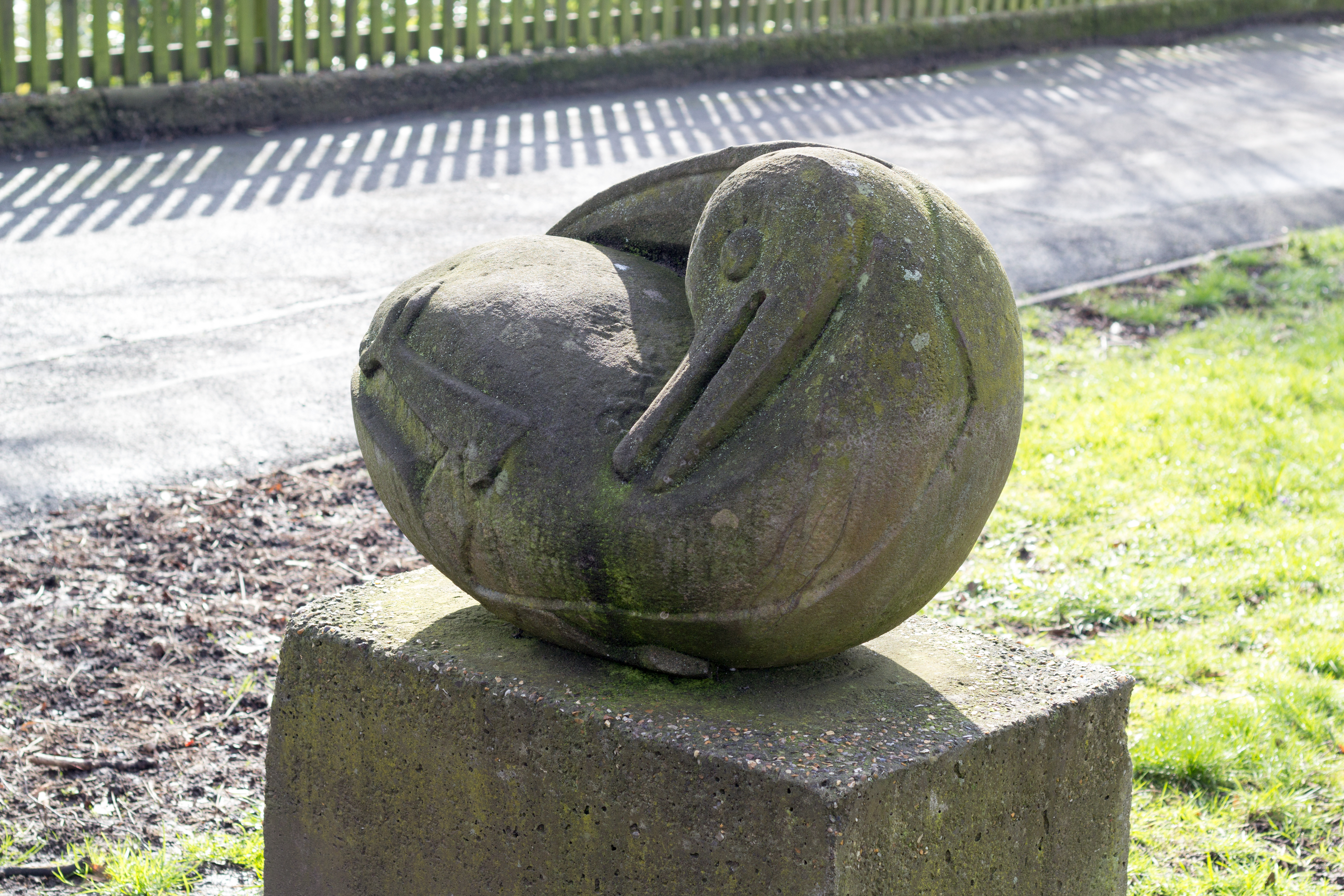
New Life Sculpture at London Zoo

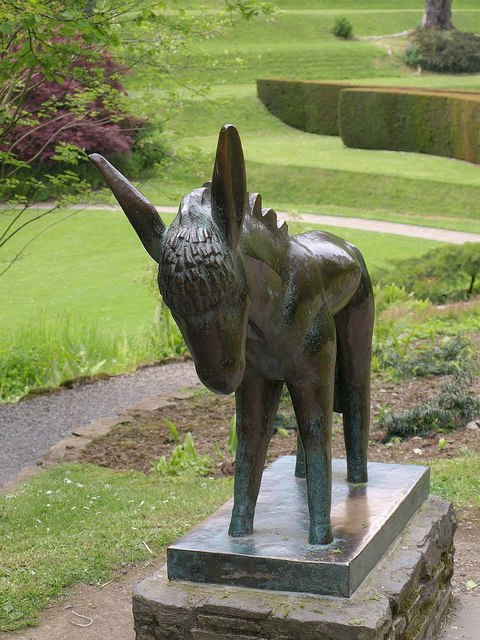
Donkey in bronze, Dartington Hall, 1935

== Sources ==
- Buckman, D., 1998
- Nairne, S. and Serota, N. (eds), 1981
- Spalding, F., 1990
- Strachan, W.J., 1984
- Obituary, The Times, 9 February 1995
