= Brynmor Jones =

Brynmor Jones may refer to:

- David Brynmor Jones (1851–1921), British MP
- Sir Brynmor Jones (academic) (1903–1989), Welsh chemist and university administrator
