= Mark C. Hunter =

Canadian naval historian (born 1974)

- Born: 1974 (age 51–52); Grand Falls-Windsor
- Education: University of Hull
- Occupation: Naval historian

Mark C. Hunter (born 1974) is a Canadian naval historian and currently an employee of the Government of Newfoundland and Labrador.

== Early life and education ==
Mark C. Hunter was born in Grand Falls-Windsor, Newfoundland and Labrador, Canada. He earned his BA Hons and MA in history in the Department of History, Memorial University of Newfoundland, and his PhD in history at the University of Hull, United Kingdom.

== Academic career ==
After competing his PhD, Hunter was a per-course lecturer at Memorial University of Newfoundland and a research fellow with the Institute of Social and Economic Research.

Hunter's work focuses on naval/military education, training and recruitment and maritime non-state actors (e.g., pirates and slave traders) and relies heavily on social and economic history. His studies of the United States Naval Academy have shown that it shared the view of adolescence in the West as a separate stage of life. Middle-class America, during the nineteenth century, shared this opinion and wanted their children educated in a safe environment for a future career, such as the Naval Academy. It was also an institution that shared this belief as it professionalized its officer corps and reveals that the United States Navy had a professional culture before the outbreak of the American Civil War.

Hunter's work on the Newfoundland Royal Naval Reserve shows that the Admiralty had to contend with local social and political conditions when managing the Newfoundland reserve. In addition, his study shows that rural fishers incorporated reserve service into their 'occupational pluralism,' working different jobs throughout the year and the British and political elite in St. John's saw the reserve as a conduit to uplift colonial citizens, and instill in them imperial sentiments.

His work on piracy and slave-trade suppression illustrates that Washington and London used their maritime and naval policies to further economic goals in the Atlantic while suppressing piracy and the slave trade and naval relations acted as a safety valve in wider Anglo-American relations until the outbreak of the American Civil War, within the context of suppressing piracy and the slave trade.

Hunter's studies have been influenced primarily by the works of Jan Glete, Andrew Lambert, William B. Skelton, David Starkey (maritime historian) and the statistical methodologies employed by maritime historians of the Atlantic Canada Shipping Project.

== Books ==
- A Society of Gentlemen: Midshipmen at the U.S. Naval Academy, 1845-1861. Naval Institute Press, 2010.
- To Employ and Uplift Them: The Newfoundland Naval Reserve, 1899-1926. ISER Books, 2009.
- Policing the Seas: Anglo-American Relations and the Equatorial Atlantic, 1819 to 1865. International Maritime Economic History Association, 2008.

== Major articles ==
- "Patriots and a Menace: American Values and the Pirate Paradox, 1776-1827," The Journal for Maritime Research 12, no. 1 (December 2010): 1-26 <http://www.informaworld.com/openurl?genre=article&issn=2153%2d3369&volume=12&issue=1&spage=1>.
- "The US Naval Academy and its Summer Cruises: Professionalization in the Antebellum US Navy, 1845 to 1861," The Journal of Military History 70, no. 4 (October 2006): 963-994.
- "The Hero Packs a Punch: Sir Charles Hotham, Liberalism, and West Africa, 1846-50," Mariner's Mirror 92, no. 3 (August 2006): 282-299.
- "HMS Calypso: Locating the Newfoundland Royal Naval Reserve Drill Ship, 1900-22," Great Circle 28, no. 1 (2006): 36-60.
- "Changing the Flag: The Cloak of Newfoundland Registry for American Rum-Running, 1924-1934," Newfoundland and Labrador Studies 21, no. 1 (Spring 2006): 41-69.
- "Anglo-American Political and Naval Response to West Indian Piracy," International Journal of Maritime History 13, no. 1 (June 2001): 63-93.
- "Youth, Law, and Discipline at the US Naval Academy, 1845-1861," The Northern Mariner 10, no. 2 (April 2000): 23-39.

== Suggested reading ==
- James C. Bradford, ed., A Companion to American Military History, Vol. 2. Chichester, UK; Malden, MA: Wiley-Blackwell Pub., 2010.
- Government of Newfoundland and Labrador, Department of Education, Department of Education Personnel, Adult Learning and Literacy Division, http://www.ed.gov.nl.ca/edu/department/directory/as_adult.html.
- Andrew Lambert, "Review of Mark C. Hunter, To Employ and Uplift Them: The Newfoundland Naval Reserve Unit [sic], 1899-1926," Mariner's Mirror 96, no. 1 (February 2010): 116-117.
- Mark C. Hunter, Official Website, http://www.mhunter.ca.
- Michael D. Robinson, "review of Society of Gentlemen: Midshipman at the U.S. Naval Academy, 1845-1861, by Hunter, Mark," Civil War Book Review, (Spring 2010).
