= Roy Marshall (legal scholar) =

Barbadian academic

Sir Roy Marshall
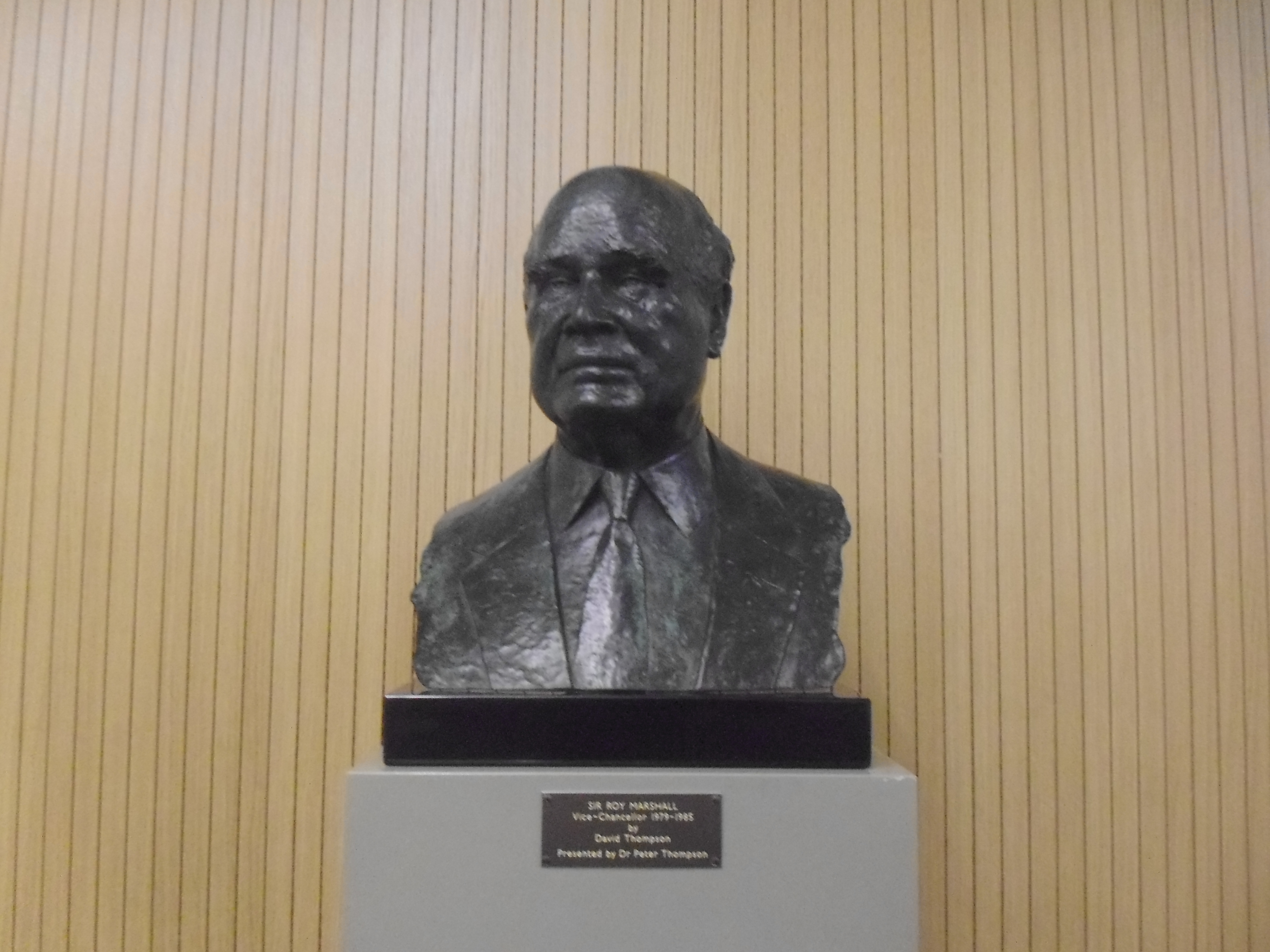
- Bust of Sir Roy Marshall, Brynmor Jones Library

3rd Vice-Chancellor University of the West Indies
- In office 1969–1974

4th Vice-Chancellor University of Hull
- In office 1979–1985
- Preceded by: Stanley R Dennison
- Succeeded by: Sir William Taylor

Personal details
- Born: 21 October 1920 Barbados, West Indies
- Died: 2 February 2015 (aged 94) Barbados

Sir Oshley Roy Marshall CBE (21 October 1920 – 2 February 2015) was a Barbadian academic lawyer, was the third vice-chancellor of the University of the West Indies and the fourth vice-chancellor of the University of Hull.

== Life ==
Marshall was born on the island of Barbados and was educated at Harrison College, Barbados and subsequently Pembroke College, Cambridge, gaining first class honours in 1945. He was called to the Bar of the Inner Temple in 1947. Marshall was awarded a doctorate from University College, London (UCL) in 1948. He taught law at UCL, and in 1956 he obtained a chair in law at the University of Sheffield. From 1956 to 1969 he remained at Sheffield excepting a period teaching at the University of Ife in Nigeria (1963–65). In the mid 1960s he was intimately involved in writing the constitution of Barbados, prior to the island's independence from the United Kingdom (UK). In 1968 Marshall was made a Commander of Order of the British Empire (CBE). In 1969 he became vice-chancellor of the University of the West Indies, serving until 1974. The Queen's New Year's Honours list of 1974 announced the award of a knighthood to Marshall. Between 1974 and 1979 he was secretary general of the Committee of Vice-Chancellors and Principals of the UK Universities. On the retirement of Stanley R Dennison in 1979, Marshall was appointed vice-chancellor of the University of Hull, serving until his own retirement in 1985.

In Marshall's time at Hull he is reputed to have refused to accept the poet Philip Larkin's resignation as university librarian. Larkin's reason for tendering his resignation was his apprehension that his technical knowledge was not adequate to cope with the changes in technology affecting how academic libraries functioned. Marshall refused the request on the grounds that Larkin's "presence on the staff was of material advantage to the university." Sir Roy was High Commissioner for Barbados in London between 1989 and 1991. Marshall made significant contributions to society in the realms of human rights and race relations. He died in November 2015, in his native Barbados.

== Bibliography ==
- Antoine, R-M B (2008) Commonwealth Caribbean Law and Legal Systems, Psychology Press.
- Briggs, A (1991) Serious Pursuits: Communications and Education, University of Illinois Press.
- Hayward J E S (2013) Out of Slavery: Abolition and After, Routledge.
