= Josephine Sinyo =

First Kenyan blind lawyer and politician

Josephine Sinyo OGW, EBS

Member of Parliament, Nominated
- Incumbent
- Assumed office 1998

Personal details
- Born: Kenya
- Party: Safina Party
- Education: University of Nairobi (LLB); University of Hull (LLM)
- Occupation: Lawyer, politician, disability rights activist
- Known for: First blind Member of Parliament in Kenya
- Awards: Order of the Grand Warrior (2006); Elder of the Burning Spear (2017); Excellence Service Award (2015)

Josephine Sinyo is a Kenyan lawyer, politician and disability rights activist. She is a member of Kenya's parliament, having become in 1998 the country's first blind person to be elected an MP.

== Early life and education ==
Josephine Sinyo is blind since having measles when she was three years old. She studied for her bachelors (LLB) at the University of Nairobi and a masters (LLM) at the University of Hull in England.

== Career ==
Experiences she had after giving birth to a child pushed her towards disability rights activism and she became chief executive officer of the Kenya Law Reform Commission (KLRC). She is also a trustee of the National Fund for People with a Disability.

In 1998, she was nominated for member of parliament by the Safina Party and was elected, becoming Kenya's first blind person to be an MP. She has also worked at the High Court of Kenya and the attorney general's office. A former MP, Dt Oki Ooko Ombaka had become blind during his service.

== Awards and recognition ==
Sinyo has received a number of state awards including the Order of the Grand Warrior (OGW) of Kenya (2006), the Excellence Service Award (2015) and the Elder of the Burning Spear (2017).

== Publications ==
- Environmental Law and Women, 1993

== See also ==
- List of first women lawyers and judges in Africa
