= International Journal of Maritime History =

- Discipline: Maritime history
- Language: English
- Edited by: David Starkey

Publication details
- History: 1989-present
- Publisher: SAGE Publications
- Frequency: Quarterly

Standard abbreviations
- ISO 4: Int. J. Marit. Hist.

Indexing
- ISSN: 0843-8714 (print); 2052-7756 (web)
- OCLC no.: 21102214

Links
- Journal homepage; Online access; Online archive

The International Journal of Maritime History is a peer-reviewed academic journal that covers all aspects of maritime history. The European Reference Index for the Humanities (ERIH) ranks it as a "Class One" journal. The journal is abstracted and indexed in Scopus and Historical Abstracts.

The journal was established in 1989 and published by the International Maritime History Association. Since 2013/14 it has been published by SAGE Publications. It also publishes monographs titled Research in Maritime History.

The founding editor-in-chief was Lewis R. Fischer, who was succeeded by David Starkey in 2013.
