= Brad K. Gibson =

Australian-Canadian astrophysicist

Brad Gibson
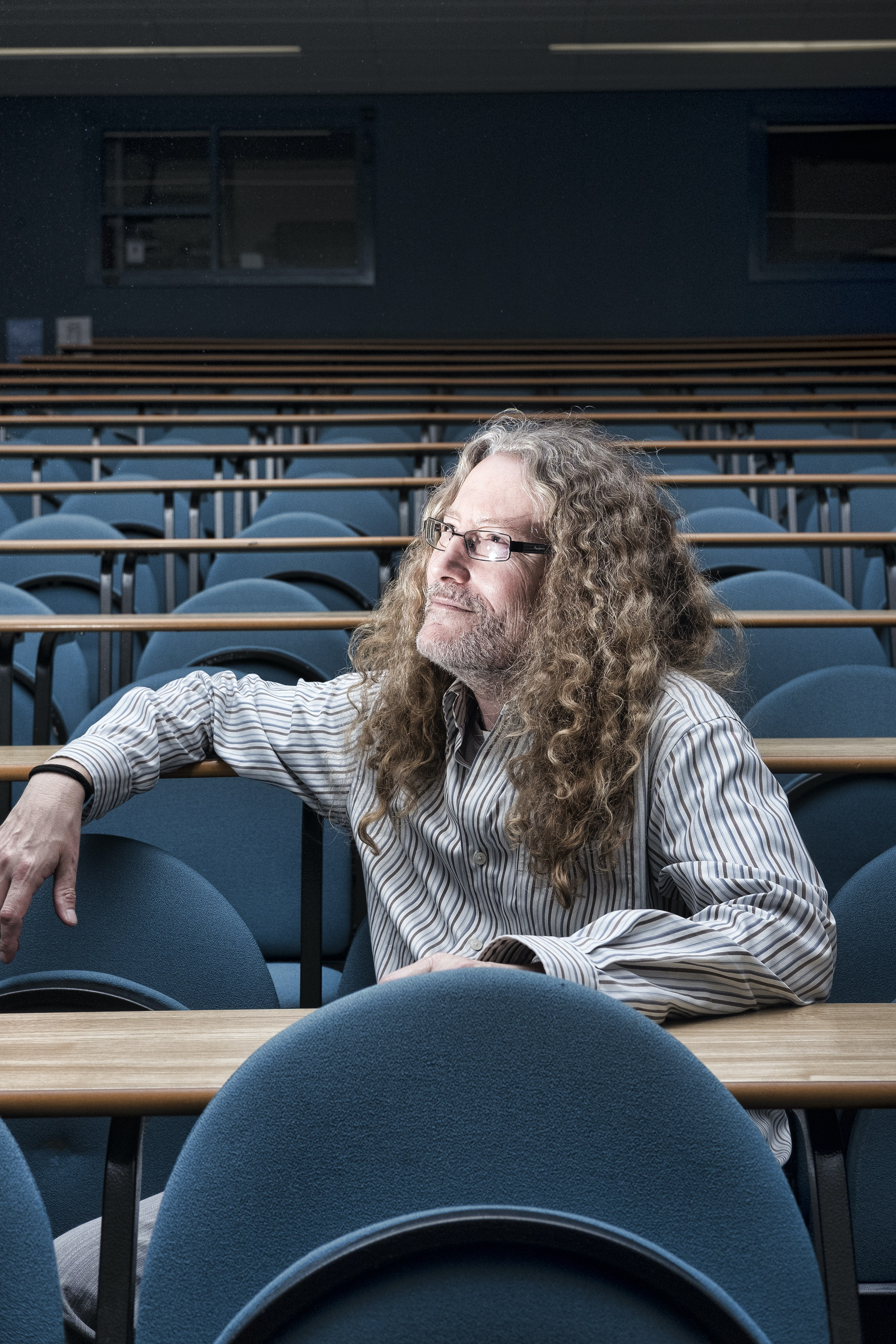
- Gibson in 2019
- Born: Bradley Kenneth Gibson
- Occupation: Astrophysicist

Academic background
- Education: University of Waterloo (BSc: 1988); University of British Columbia (PhD: 1995)
- Thesis: Photo-chemical Evolution of Elliptical Galaxies and the Intergalactic Medium (1995)
- Doctoral advisor: Paul Hickson, Francesca Matteucci

Academic work
- Institutions: University of Hull; University of Central Lancashire; Swinburne University of Technology; University of Colorado; Australian National University

Bradley Kenneth Gibson is a retired Australian-Canadian astrophysicist. He is known for identifying the regions of the Galaxy most likely to harbor complex biological life, designing and constructing the first operational liquid mirror telescope observatory, and using supernovae as cosmological probes, the latter for which led to the 2009 Gruber Prize in Cosmology. A passionate advocate for Widening Participation, Gibson delivers more than 100 presentations annually to schools and the general public; his Changing Face of Physics campaign was highlighted as Good Practice by the UK Equality Challenge Unit.

== Early life and education ==
Gibson was born in Toronto, Canada and raised in Ajax, Ontario and Mississauga, Ontario, where he latterly attended Port Credit Secondary School. He earned a BSc Degree with Honors in Physics from the University of Waterloo (1988), before pursuing an MSc in Astronomical Instrumentation (1990) and PhD Degree in Theoretical Astrophysics (1995) at the University of British Columbia. His postgraduate research demonstrated the viability of rotating liquid mirrors for astronomical imaging and was awarded a SPIE Scholarship for its Outstanding Long-Range Contributions to Optical Sciences.

== Career ==
In 1995, Gibson was awarded an NSERC Research Fellowship which he held for three years at the Australian National University. Following his research fellowship, Gibson joined the University of Colorado as a Research Associate, before joining Swinburne University of Technology as a professor of astrophysics in 2000; during his tenure at Swinburne, Gibson also served as deputy director to the newly formed Centre for Astrophysics and Supercomputing, and Deputy Head for the School of Biological Sciences and Electrical Engineering. In 2006, Gibson was appointed chair in Theoretical Astrophysics at the University of Central Lancashire. Gibson joined the University of Hull in 2015, where he was responsible for the establishment of the E.A. Milne Centre for Astrophysics and, from 2017 to 2024, served as the Head of the Department of Physics and Mathematics.

Gibson served as a member of United Kingdom's Research Excellence Framework 2021 Physics Sub-Panel, the Joint Institute for Nuclear Astrophysics Advisory Panel, a Trustee for the Spacelink Learning Foundation, and Vice-President of the Astronomical Society of Australia. He sat on the advisory board of YobiMinds Ltd., the Royal Society University Research Fellowship Panel, the Institute of Physics Heads of Department Steering Group, and the Scientific Editorial Board for The Astrophysical Journal.

== Research ==
Gibson and Paul Hickson designed and constructed the world's first operational Liquid Mirror Telescope Observatory, in Vancouver, Canada. His PhD involved the development of software tools to aid in mapping the distribution of the chemical elements throughout the Universe. With those tools, Gibson's team was able to define the Galactic Habitable Zone, the regions of our Milky Way Galaxy most likely to harbour complex biological life, research that was named by the readers of National Geographic Magazine as one of the Top 10 News Stories of the Year and led to a TEDx talk on the topic of alien life. As an NSERC Research Fellow at the Australian National University, Gibson led the Hubble Space Telescope Key Project on the Extragalactic Distance Scale in its use of exploding stars – supernovae – to determine the expansion rate of the Universe, research which led to the award of the 2009 Gruber Prize in Cosmology. Gibson was also responsible for leading the HI Parkes All-Sky Survey working group tasked with characterizing the mysterious high-velocity gas clouds which surround the Milky Way Galaxy; he and his PhD student, Mary Putman, provided the first evidence that strong gravitational forces were disrupting our closest neighbouring galaxies. As a Galactic Archaeologist, Gibson's team was responsible for developing the primary paradigm which describes the emergence of thick stellar disks within a cosmological framework, and subsequently saw Gibson elected a Builder of the Radial Velocity Experiment. Most recently, Gibson has taken on Co-Primary Investigator status (with Changbom Park) for Horizon Run 5, an ambitious cosmological simulation of the Universe.

=== Science advocacy ===
Gibson is an active schools and public outreach ambassador, delivering 100+ events and presentations annually. His efforts include appearances at the Royal Institution of Great Britain, the Cheltenham Science Festival, European AstroFest (opening for Brian Cox and Lucy Hawking), the British Science Festival, a TEDx talk on the search for alien life, and a monthly radio spot on BBC Radio Humberside. His efforts though are focused more on Widening Participation across socio-economic boundaries, with the majority of his 100+ annual events aimed at schools situated within areas of monetary deprivation. Since 2015, he has run more than 1000 events, reaching more than 60,000 people in-person, including 30,000+ students across 100 different schools. His efforts led to him being named the Institute of Physics John Porter Memorial Lecturer, the Leon Davis Lecturers (Glasgow), the Ray Bootland Memorial Lecturers (Hampshire), and the Bexwyke Lecturer (Manchester).

Gibson's contributions to Science Advocacy and Research led to his election to Fellow of the Institute of Physics in 2021. In 2023, Gibson was named Honorary President of the Association for Science Education.

== Awards and honors ==
- 1988 – G.A. Bakos Award, University of Waterloo
- 1990 – SPIE Scholarship in Optical Engineering, The International Society for Optical Engineering (SPIE)
- 1995 – NSERC Research Fellowship
- 2003 – Research Excellence Award, Swinburne University
- 2004 – Top 10 News Story of the year, National Geographic
- 2012 – The Kevin Westfold Distinguished Visitor, Monash University
- 2015 – The John Porter Memorial Lecture, Institute of Physics
- 2018 – Outstanding Research Group – Science and Engineering, University of Hull
- 2018 – Athena Swan Bronze Award, AdvanceHE
- 2019 – The Bexwyke Lecture, Manchester Grammar School
- 2019 – The Leon Davies Lecture, Astronomical Society of Glasgow
- 2019 – The Ray Bootland Memorial Lecture – Hampshire Astronomical Group
- 2019 – Outstanding Contributions to Outreach, University of Hull
- 2021 – Elected Fellow of the Institute of Physics

== Bibliography ==
=== Books ===
- The Third Stromlo Symposium: The Galactic Halo (1999) ISBN 978-1886733862
- Stromlo Workshop on High-Velocity Clouds (1999) ISBN 978-1886733879
- The 5th Workshop on Galactic Chemodyamics (2004)
- Workshop on Numerical Modeling in MHD and Plasma Physics (2018)
- Second Workshop on Numerical Modeling in MHD and Plasma Physics (2019)
- Third Workshop on Numerical Modeling in MHD and Plasma Physics (2020)

=== Selected articles ===
- Putman, M.E., Gibson, B.K, et al. (1998), Tidal Disruption of the Magellanic Clouds by the Milky Way, Nature, 394, 752
- Freedman, W.L., Madore, B.F., Gibson, B.K., et al. (2001). Final Results from the Hubble Space Telescope Key Project to Measure the Hubble Constant. The Astrophysical Journal, 553, 47
- Lineweaver, C.H., Fenner, Y., Gibson, B.K. (2004). The Galactic Habitable Zone and the Age Distribution of Complex Life in the Milky Way, Science, 303, 59
- Brook, C.B., Kawata, D., Gibson, B.K., Freeman, K.C. (2004). The Emergence of the Thick Disk in a Cold Dark Matter Universe, The Astrophysical Journal, 612, 894
- Pilkington, K., Few, C.G., Gibson, B.K., et al. (2012). Metallicity Gradients in Disks. Do Galaxies Form Inside-Out?, Astronomy & Astrophysics, 540, A56
