= Stanley R. Dennison =

British economist and university administrator

Stanley Dennison

3rd Vice-Chancellor University of Hull
- In office 1972–1979
- Preceded by: Sir Brynmor Jones
- Succeeded by: Sir Roy Marshall

Personal details
- Born: Stanley Raymond Dennison; 15 June 1912 North Shields, Northumberland, later Tyneside, England
- Died: 22 November 1992 (aged 80)

Stanley Raymond Dennison (15 June 1912 – 22 November 1992), an economist, was the third vice-chancellor of the University of Hull.

Dennison was born in North Shields, the son of a gas company clerk. He was educated at Tynemouth Municipal High School, Armstrong College, Newcastle (then part of the University of Durham), and subsequently Trinity College, Cambridge, where he was awarded a first class (division two) in Part II of the economics tripos in 1935 (one of only five students to receive a first that year – three of the others were David Bensusan-Butt, Richard Stone and D. G. Champernowne).

From 1935 to 1939 he lectured in economics at the University of Manchester, where he wrote the influential book The Location of Industry and the Depressed Areas (1939). In 1939 he was given a chair as professor of economics at University College Swansea, but shortly after, in 1940, he was appointed chief economic assistant at the War Office. He later worked closely with Harold Wilson, both of whom were assistants to William Beveridge. This work earned Dennison his CBE. At the end of the war he returned to Cambridge as a fellow of Gonville and Caius College. Later he was a professor at Queen's University, Belfast and subsequently David Dale Professor of Economics and pro-vice-chancellor at the University of Newcastle.

On the retirement of Sir Brynmor Jones in 1972, Dennison was appointed vice-chancellor of the University of Hull. Dennison's time at Hull saw a period of retrenchment following earlier expansion of the university. Within a straightened budget he nevertheless expanded subject coverage at the university. However, his relationship with student activists and some staff in a period of heightened political and social unrest on campus was notably abrasive. He never married, and retired in 1979 to his native Tyneside. His academic work was characterised by a liberal economic viewpoint.

== Bibliography ==
- Bamford, T.W. (1978) The University of Hull: the First Fifty Years, Published for the University of Hull by Oxford University Press.
- Obituary - The Times (of London) 24 November 1992.
