= Susan Lea =

Psychologist and academic

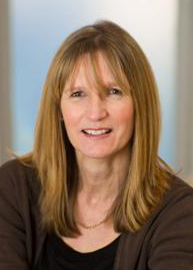

9th Vice-Chancellor University of Hull
- In office 2017–2022
- Preceded by: Calie Pistorius
- Succeeded by: David Petley

Professor Susan Lea is a chartered psychologist and academic, and was Vice-Chancellor at the University of Hull from 2017 to 2022. Previously she was Deputy Vice-Chancellor (Academic) at the University of Greenwich.

== Education ==
Lea attended the University of Cape Town where she gained a Bachelor of Social Science in 1982, a Bachelor of Arts in 1984 and a Master of Arts in 1986. In 1995 she received her Doctor of Philosophy from Loughborough University on South African Racial Discourse: A Social Psychological Study.

== Career ==
Lea trained as a community psychologist at the University of Cape Town. While at Plymouth University she was Acting Dean of the Health Faculty, Associate Dean (Learning and Teaching) of the Health Faculty, and Director of the Centre for Excellence in Professional Placement Learning.

From November 2010, she was Dean of Education in the Institute of Psychiatry, Psychology & Neuroscience at King's College and also held roles as Interim Vice Principal of (Education) and Lead for Education across the Health Schools.

Lea joined the University of Greenwich in April 2015 as Deputy Vice-Chancellor with responsibility for academic strategy including all aspects of quality, standards and enhancement.

== Interests ==
Her research interests include social justice, sexual and domestic violence, the attrition of rape cases within the criminal justice system, rape survivors’ experiences of sexual assault referral centres, and mental health. This involves working with police, NHS staff and academics.
