= John H. Nicholson =

John Henry Nicholson

2nd Principal of University College Hull
- In office 1935–1954
- Preceded by: Arthur E Morgan

1st Vice-Chancellor University of Hull
- In office 1954–1956
- Succeeded by: Sir Brynmor Jones

Personal details
- Born: 21 September 1889
- Died: 9 August 1972 (aged 82)

John Henry Nicholson (21 September 1889 – 9 August 1972) was the second Principal of University College Hull, and the first Vice-Chancellor of the University of Hull.

Dr John H Nicholson was educated at the University of Oxford, where he gained a 'double first' in theology. His scholarly interests centred on 'extra-mural education'. He taught at the University of Bristol and later was made a professor at what was to become Newcastle University (then part of the University of Durham). Nicholson was the second Principal of University College Hull, from 1935 to 1954. He guided the college through the difficult years of World War II, and oversaw the transition of the university college to the status of a fully independent university, becoming the new university's first vice-chancellor (1954–1956). He had a slight and rather hunched appearance and a heavy smoking habit, even smoking through committee meetings. Nicholson was a bachelor throughout his career, on leaving the university he retired to the city of York.

== Bibliography ==
- Bamford, T. W. (1978) The University of Hull: the First Fifty Years, Published for the University of Hull by Oxford University Press.
- Hoggart, R. (1994) A Measured Life: The Times and Places of an Orphaned Intellectual, Transaction Publishers.
