= Brynmor Jones Library =

Main library in the University of Hull, East Riding of Yorkshire, England

Coordinates: 53.77109°N 0.36911°W

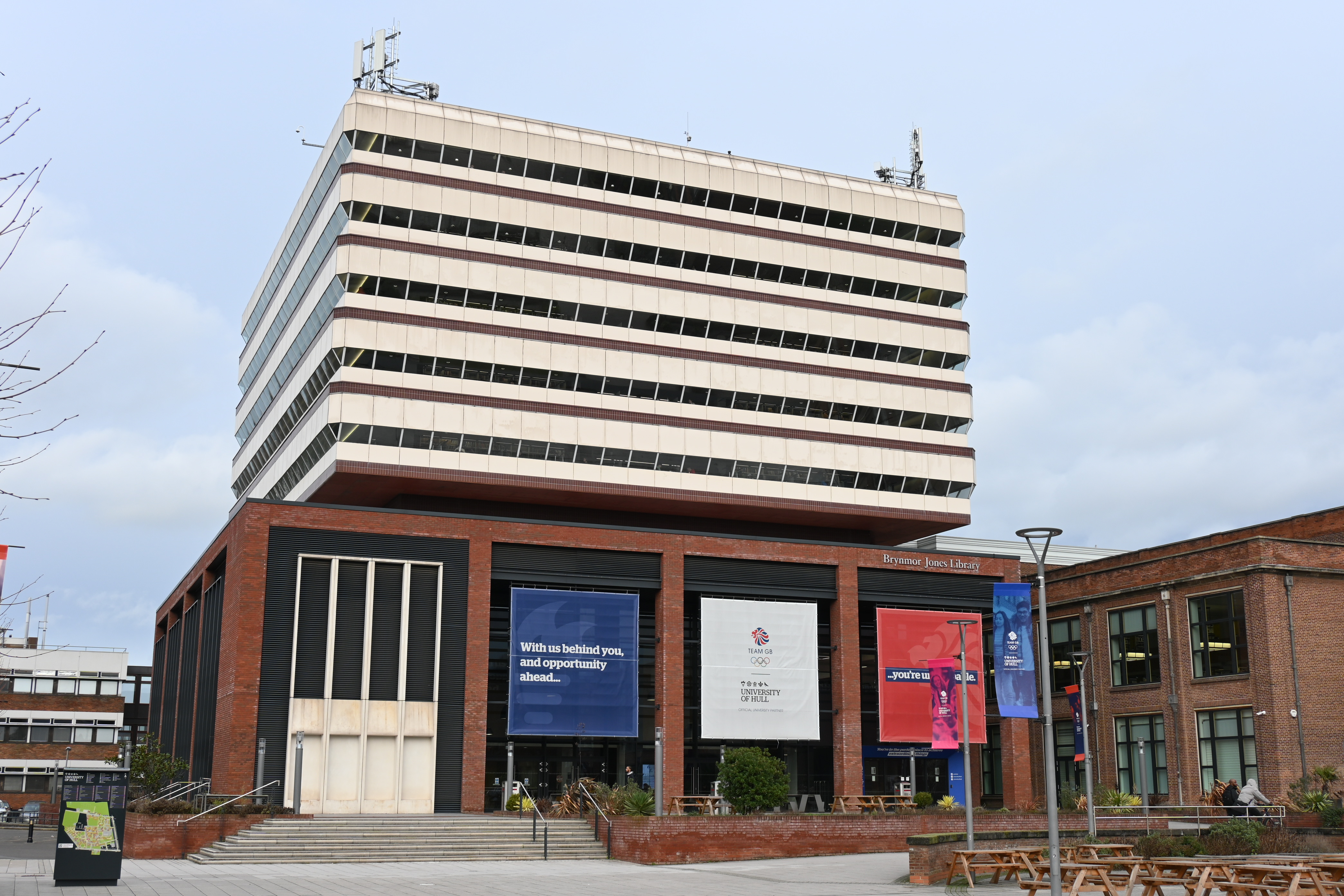
The Brynmor Jones Library

The Brynmor Jones Library (BJL) is the main library at the University of Hull, England. In 1967 it was named after Sir Brynmor Jones (1903–1989) who initiated research in the field of Liquid Crystals (LCD) at Hull and became Head of the Department of Chemistry in 1947. He was the Vice-Chancellor of the University from 1956 to 1972.

== Building ==
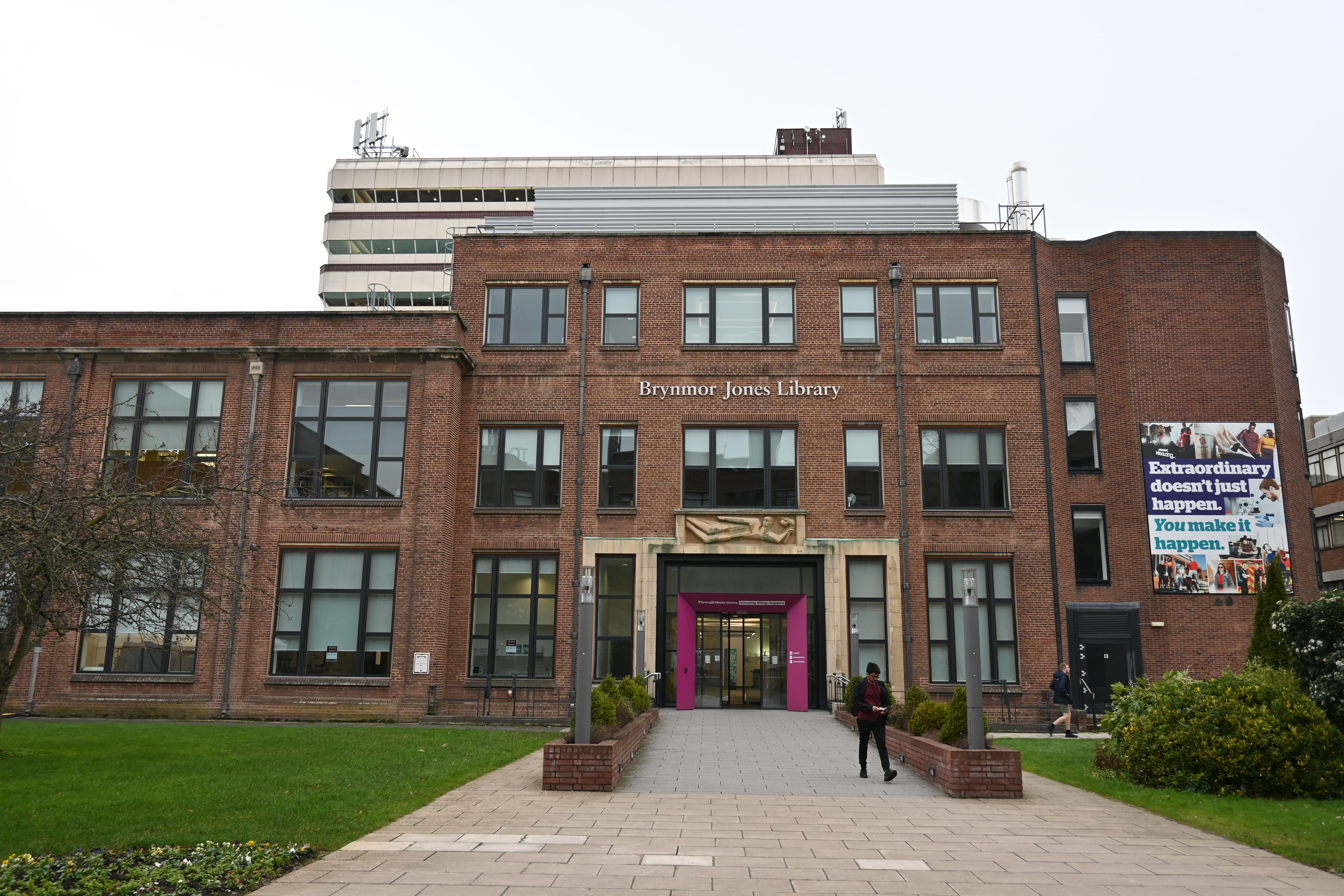
The main entrance

The building consists of two main sections: the older Art Deco style entrance and front section, built in the 1950s, which is five floors high (originally three which were later subdivided by mezzanines) and the newer extension, completed in 1970, which consists of eight floors plus a basement. The older section has two exterior bas-relief sculptures by Willi Soukop: one is of an owl; the other shows a human figure representing the light of knowledge and is positioned directly over the main entrance. The modern section has views over the Humber with three lifts for student use and a fourth lift for staff. The library contains over a million books, plus other reference materials, primarily for use by students at the university. There are also a large number of open access computers within the library which are connected to the University network.

== University of Hull Art Collection ==
The library also serves as home to the university's Art Collection. Started in 1963, the collection's focus is British art from 1890 to 1940, including works by the Bloomsbury and Camden Town Groups as well as inter-war sculpture.

The collection was formed originally to expose the university's students to real works of art funding by an bequeath from Thomas Ferens to encourage fine arts.

== Philip Larkin ==
In 1955 poet Philip Larkin became University Librarian, a post he held until his death in 1985. This was a period of significant expansion in the British university system and when Larkin took up his appointment there, the plans for a new university library were already far advanced. However, he made a great effort in just a few months to familiarize himself with them before they were placed before the University Grants Committee, suggesting numerous major and structural changes, all of which were adopted. Ten years after the new library's completion, Larkin introduced computerized records for the entire library stock, making it the first in Europe to install a Geac computer system, an automated online circulation system.

An iconic photograph of Larkin by Fay Godwin shows him leaning against a bookcase in the newly completed Brynmor Jones Library in 1969.
