= William Taylor (academic) =

British educator (1930–2023)

Sir William Taylor

5th Vice-Chancellor of the University of Hull
- In office 1985–1991
- Preceded by: Sir Roy Marshall
- Succeeded by: David Dilks

Personal details
- Born: 31 May 1930 Crayford, Kent, England
- Died: January 2023 (aged 92)
- Education: London School of Economics (BSc)

Sir William Taylor CBE (31 May 1930 – January 2023) was a British educator who served as the fifth vice-chancellor of the University of Hull.

== Early life and education ==
Taylor was born in Crayford, Kent and was educated at the London School of Economics (BSc, 1952) and subsequently took a post-graduate teaching qualification (1953). He began his career as a primary school teacher, but returned to academic study, earning a PhD in 1960.

== Career ==
Starting in 1960, Taylor held a number of lecturing positions at various colleges of education and then at the University of Oxford (1964–66). Subsequently, he obtained a chair at the University of Bristol (1966–73). From 1973 to 1985, he worked in London, first as Director of the UCL Institute of Education and then, from 1983, as the Principal of the University of London. In 1982, he was awarded a CBE. Upon the retirement of Sir Roy Marshall in 1985, Taylor was appointed vice-chancellor of the University of Hull, serving until his own retirement in 1991.

Taylor served as the president or chairman of a number of national and international educational organisations. He authored many books and other publications, and in 1990 he was knighted. He was the recipient of numerous honorary doctorates.

Taylor served as interim head of the Winchester School of Art from April 2004.

== Death ==
Taylor died in January 2023, at the age of 92.

== Bibliography ==
- Hayes, D. (ed) (2005) The Routledge Falmer Guide to Key Debates in Education, Routledge.
- Tan O.S., Wong H.O. and Seng S.H. (eds) (2015) Global Voices in Education: Ruth Wong Memorial Lectures, Springer.
