= Calie Pistorius =

South African academic (born 1958)

Carl Wilhelm Irene Pistorius
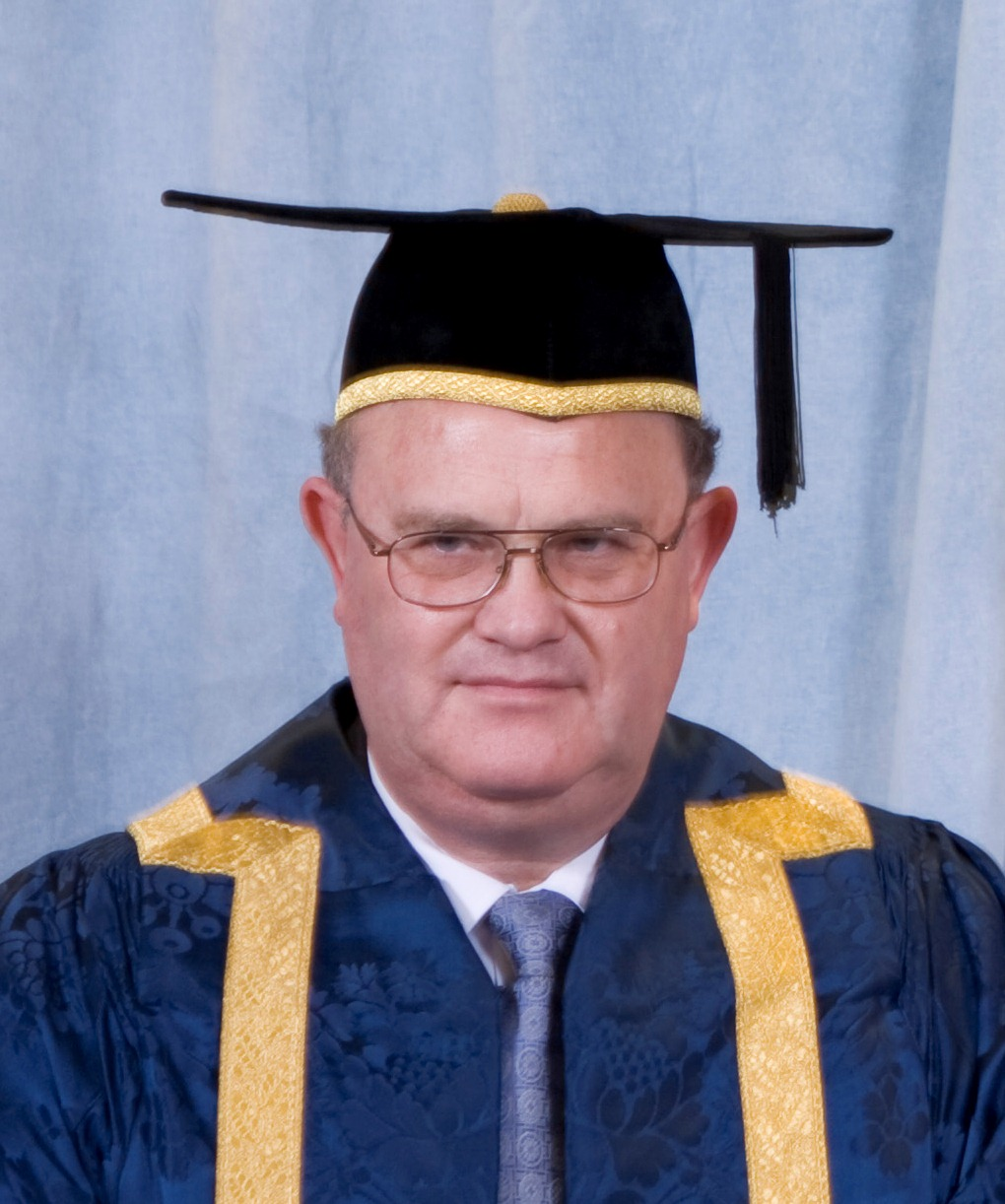

Vice chancellor of University of Pretoria
- In office 2001–2009
- Preceded by: J. van Zyl
- Succeeded by: Cheryl de la Rey

8th Vice chancellor of University of Hull
- In office 2009–2017
- Preceded by: David Drewry
- Succeeded by: Susan Lea

Personal details
- Born: 9 August 1958 (age 68)
- Education: University of Pretoria; Ohio State University; MIT Sloan School of Management
- Scientific career
- Fields: Electrical engineering
- Thesis: New main reflector, subreflector and dual chamber concepts for compact range applications (antenna, scattering measurements) (1968)
- Doctoral advisor: W. D. Burnside

Carl Wilhelm Irene "Calie" Pistorius (born 9 August 1958) is a South African electrical engineer who is a former Vice-Chancellor of the University of Hull, Kingston upon Hull, United Kingdom. He announced, on 1 August 2016, that he would be stepping down from this role at the end of January 2017. His successor at Hull was Professor Susan Lea.

== Education ==
Pistorius obtained the degree B.Sc (Eng) (cum laude) in electronic engineering from the University of Pretoria in 1979 and the degree B.Eng (Hons) (cum laude) in electronic engineering from the same university in 1981. He obtained a M.S. degree in electrical engineering from the Ohio State University in the U.S. in 1984, a Ph.D. degree in electrical engineering also from the Ohio State University in 1986, and a Master's degree in management (M.B.A.) from the MIT Sloan School of Management in 1994.

== Academic career ==
Pistorius is a consultant to industry and government on issues relating to strategy, management of technology, technological innovation, competitiveness and national technological policy. He is also a member of the National Advisory Council on Innovation in South Africa.

Pistorius has published widely both nationally and internationally and has 107 academic publications to his credit. He has received numerous awards and prizes including the prize for the best Ph.D. dissertation from the ElectroScience Laboratory at the Ohio State University, the President's Award from the National Research Foundation and the Bill Venter Prize for outstanding contributions to research published in book form by university personnel in South Africa.

At the university, Pistorius was head of the Department of Electronic and Electrical Engineering for five years, Director of the Institute for Technological Innovation for four years, Director of Information Technology for two years and Dean of the Faculty for one and a half years.

On 25 February 2009, it was announced that Pistorius would be stepping down from his position as Vice-Chancellor and Principal of the University of Pretoria, in order to take up the role of Vice-Chancellor of the University of Hull, as of 1 September 2009. He was chair of Yorkshire Universities, a Yorkshire Patron, a director of Jisc and served on the City Leadership Board in Hull. He resigned from the position of vice-chancellor of the University of Hull in 2017, and was succeeded by Susan Lea.

Academic offices
Preceded by J van Zyl	Vice-Chancellor of the University of Pretoria; 2001 – 2009	Succeeded by Cheryl de la Rey
Preceded by David Drewry	Vice-Chancellor of the University of Hull; 2009 – 2017	Succeeded by Susan Lea
