= South East Asia Research =

Quarterly peer-reviewed academic journal

The South East Asia Research is an international quarterly peer-reviewed academic journal covering scholarly studies on all aspects of Southeast Asia within the disciplines of archaeology, art history, economics, geography, history, language and literature, law, music, political science, social anthropology and religious studies. It is published by Taylor & Francis on behalf of SOAS University of London. The editor is Rachel V Harrison. This journal is abstracted and indexed by Scopus.
