= David Starkey (maritime historian) =

British maritime historian (born 1954)

David John Starkey (born 20 September 1954) is a specialist in eighteenth- and nineteenth-century British maritime history. His research focuses on shipping, seafaring, privateering, fisheries and marine environmental history.

== Life ==
Starkey earned a degree in Economic History from the University of Leeds, an MA in the History of the Atlantic Economy and a PhD on 'British Privateering in the 18th Century' from the University of Exeter. He has been based since 1994 at the University of Hull, where he was founding director of the Maritime Historical Studies Centre. He was head of the Department of History from 2011 to 2016, and subsequently Academic Manager for the Faculty of Arts, Cultures and Education. He retired in January 2020, and continues as Emeritus Professor.

Starkey was co-president of the North Atlantic Fisheries History Association (NAFHA), and chairman of the British Commission for Maritime History. From 2013 to 2021 he served as Editor-in-Chief of the International Journal of Maritime History.

== Publications ==
- Starkey, David J. (1990). British Privateering Enterprise in the Eighteenth Century. Exeter: University of Exeter Press. ISBN 0-85989-312-X.
- Starkey, David J.; van Eyck van Heslinga, E. S. (1997). Pirates and Privateers: New Perspectives on the War on Trade in the Eighteenth and Nineteenth Centuries. Exeter: University of Exeter Press.
- Starkey, David J. (1999). Shipping Movements in the Ports of the United Kingdom, 1871–1913: A Statistical Profile. Exeter: University of Exeter Press.
- Starkey, David J.; Thor, Jon; Heidbrink, Ingo, eds. (2009). A History of the North Atlantic Fisheries. Vol. 1: From Early Times to the mid-Nineteenth Century. Bremen: Hauschild.
