= Brynmor Jones (academic) =

2nd Vice-Chancellor University of Hull
- In office 1956–1972
- Preceded by: John H. Nicholson
- Succeeded by: Stanley R. Dennison

Personal details
- Born: 25 September 1903
- Died: 16 July 1989 (aged 85)

Sir Brynmor Jones (25 September 1903 – 16 July 1989) was a Welsh-born chemist and academic, who served as vice-chancellor of the University of Hull.

== Biography ==
Brynmor Jones was born in North Wales and was educated at University College of Wales at Bangor (BSc in Chemistry, 1925) and at St John's College, Cambridge (PhD, 1933). He obtained a number of research fellowships at the Chemistry Department in Cambridge. He gained his first teaching post at the University of Sheffield in 1931, where he began research into liquid crystals. In 1947 he was appointed to a professorial chair in Chemistry at the University College Hull. A year later he was awarded the DSc higher doctorate. During his early years at Hull he was made Dean of Science, and later Deputy Principal. When the college achieved full university status in 1954, he became its Pro-Vice-Chancellor. In 1956, on the retirement of John H. Nicholson, Jones was appointed Vice-Chancellor.

Brynmor Jones oversaw a period of rapid expansion of the University of Hull, with student numbers quadrupling during his time in office. He notably steered the university through a period of significant student unrest over the summer of 1968. In the same year he received a knighthood in the New Year's Honours List. Jones was a driving force behind the expansion of Hull University library, working closely with the university librarian Philip Larkin. The new library was opened in 1960; later, in 1967, it was named the Brynmor Jones Library in his honour. Jones received a number of honorary degrees. He retired in 1972.

== Bibliography ==
- Bamford, T.W. (1978) The University of Hull: the First Fifty Years, Published for the University of Hull by Oxford University Press.
