= University of Hull =

University in Kingston upon Hull, East Riding of Yorkshire, England

- Coat of arms
- Motto: Latin: Lampada Ferens
- Motto in English: Bearing the Torch [of learning]
- Type: Public
- Established: 1927 – University College Hull; 1954 – university status
- Affiliations: Global U8 (GU8); Utrecht Network; Universities UK; EUA; ResearchPlus
- Endowment: £15.6 million (2025)
- Budget: £201.2 million (2024/25)
- Chancellor: Alan Johnson
- Vice-Chancellor: Professor Tom Lawson
- Visitor: The Lord President of the Council ex officio
- Academic staff: 915 (2024/25)
- Total staff: 2,090 (2024/25)
- Students: 14,715 (2024/25)
- Undergraduates: 9,035 (2024/25)
- Postgraduates: 5,680 (2024/25)
- Location: Kingston upon Hull; 53.770263°N 0.367141°W, England
- Campus: Urban area
Colours
Scarf colours, blue and gold
Academic silk colour turquoise blue
- Website: hull.ac.uk

The University of Hull is a public research university in Kingston upon Hull, a city in the East Riding of Yorkshire, England. It was founded in 1927 as University College Hull. The main university campus is located in Hull and is home to the Hull York Medical School, a joint initiative with the University of York. Students are served by Hull University Union.

The first chancellor of the university was Lord Middleton (1954–1969), followed by Lord Cohen (1970–1977), Lord Wilberforce (1978–1994), Lord Armstrong (1994–2006) and Virginia Bottomley (Baroness Bottomley of Nettlestone) (2006–2023). Alan Johnson was installed as the current chancellor in July 2023.

== History ==
=== University College ===
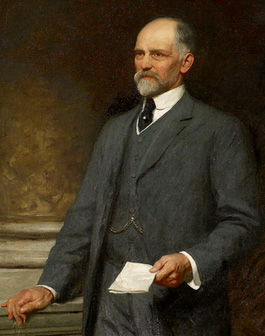
Thomas Ferens (1847–1930), the major benefactor financing the foundation of the University College of Hull

The foundation stone of University College Hull, then an external college of the University of London, was laid in 1927 by Prince Albert, the Duke of York (who later became king as George VI). The college was built on land donated by Hull City Council and by two local benefactors, Thomas Ferens and G F Grant. A year later the first 14 departments, in pure sciences and the arts, opened with 39 students. The college at that time consisted of one building, now named the Venn building (after the mathematician John Venn, who was born in Hull). The building now houses the administrative centre of the university.

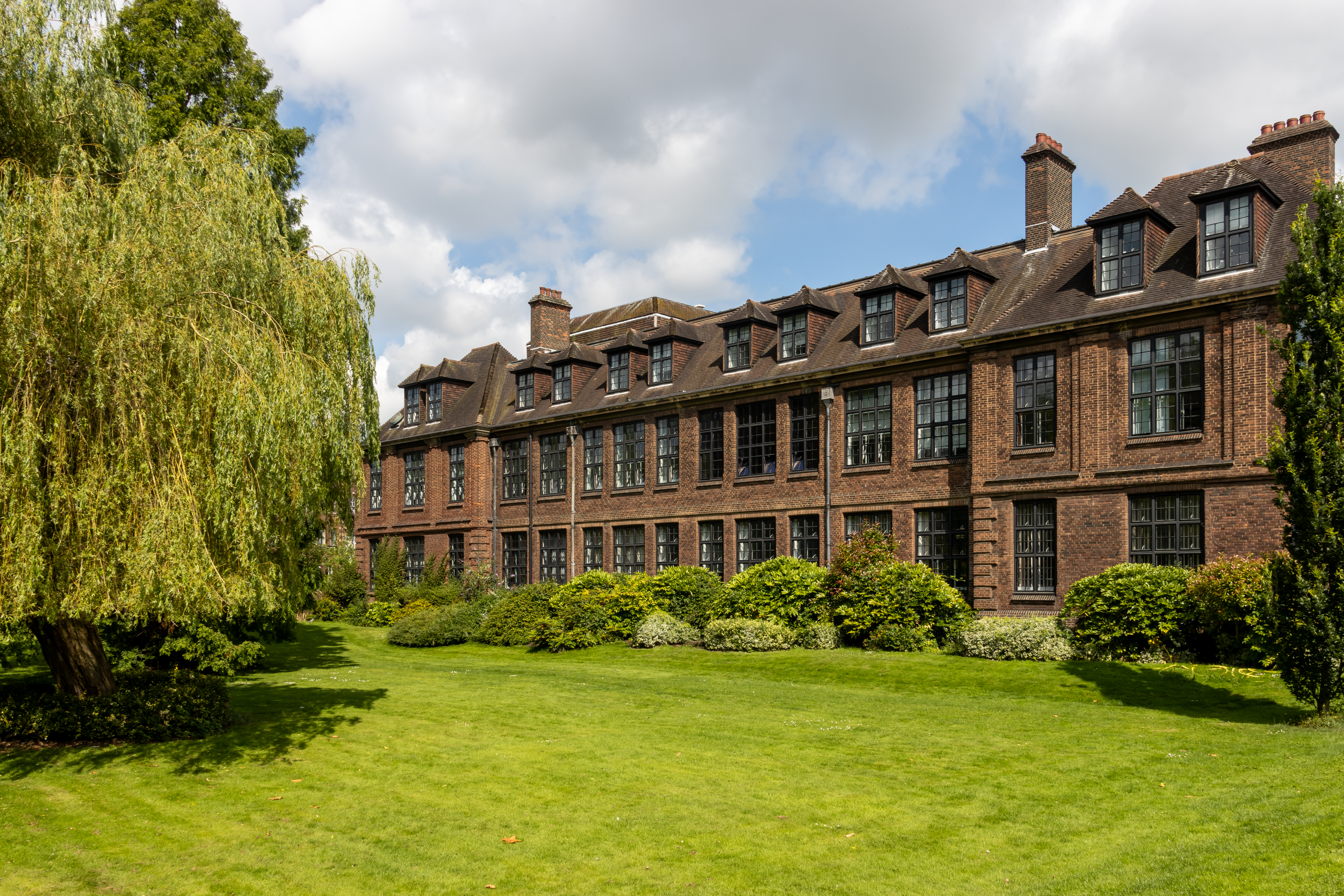
The Venn Building

Other early buildings include the Cohen Building, which originally housed the college library, and Staff House, now named Canham Turner building, built in 1948 as the Students' Union. Another early structure was the Chemistry Building, built in 1953. With the rapid expansion of student numbers which took place in the 1950s many academic departments were housed in temporary buildings, colloquially known as 'huts', which gave the campus the feel of an 'academic army camp'. The Dennison Centre on Cottingham Road was formerly the Brooklands Officers Hospital opened by the Red Cross in 1917. The author J. R. R. Tolkien was a convalescent patient at Brooklands and his connection is marked by a blue plaque.

Though many of the older buildings on Hull's campus are of red brick it is not a redbrick university in the strictest sense of the term, as it was not founded as part of the civic university movement of the late Victorian and Edwardian eras. Hull, with its origins in the 1920s, has been categorised as a 'younger civic university' (also referred to as a "Whitetile university") and it is placed between the 'redbricks' and the 'plateglass universities' founded in the 1960s.

The first principal of the college was Arthur E. Morgan (1926–1935), the second was John H Nicholson (1935–1954), who also served as the university's first vice-chancellor when the college was granted university status (1954–1956).

==== Coat of arms ====
The university coat of arms was designed by Sir Algernon Tudor-Craig in 1928. The symbols are the torch for learning, the rose for Yorkshire, the ducal coronet from the arms of the City of Hull, the fleur-de-lys for Lincolnshire and the dove, symbolising peace, from the arms of Thomas Ferens. These symbols were later reused to create the current university logo. The motto, Lampada Ferens (Bearing the Torch), incorporates the name of the university's founding father within a Latin pun.

=== Royal charter ===
The college gained its royal charter on 6 September 1954. This empowered it to award degrees of its own, making it the 3rd university in Yorkshire and the 14th in England. The twenty six years between the formation of the university college and the awarding of the charter were the shortest such period in the history of university formation in England up to that time. Within a year of the charter being granted applications to study at the new university had doubled, and in 1956 student numbers topped 1,000 for the first time.

=== The mace ===
The academic authority and autonomy of the university is symbolically embodied in the ceremonial mace. Made of gilt silver, and incorporating devices from the Hull University coat of arms, the mace was presented to the university in December 1956 by the Lord Mayor of Hull. As a gift from the city it also reflects the close relationship between "town and gown" existing in Hull. The mace is carried in procession and displayed at all major university ceremonies.

=== Expansion in the 1950s and 1960s ===
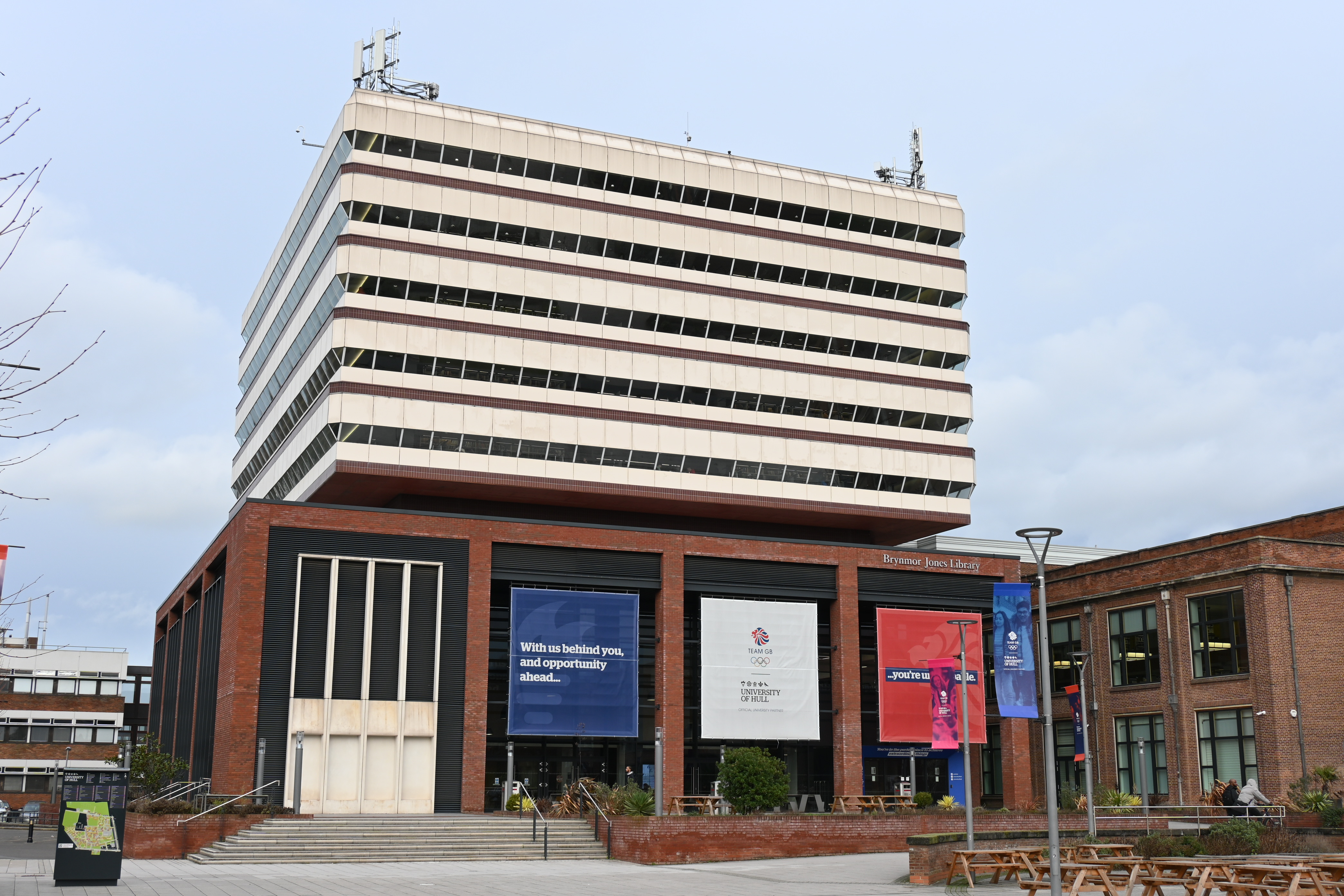
Brynmor Jones Library

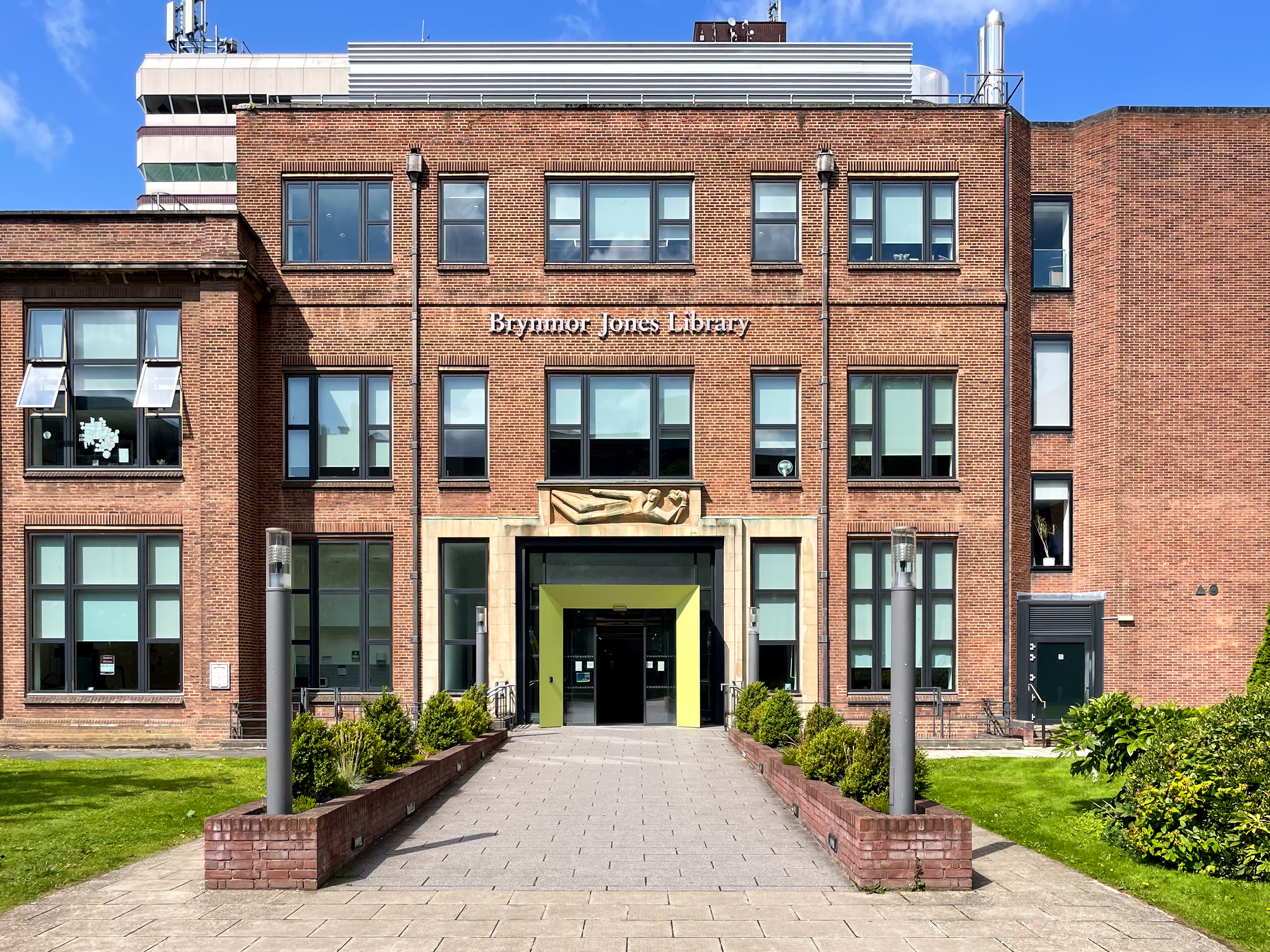
The Eastern entrance of the Brynmor Jones Library

The period of rapid expansion of Hull University coincided with the vice-chancellorship of Sir Brynmor Jones (1956–1972), during whose time in office student numbers quadrupled.

The Brynmor Jones Library, which houses more than a million volumes, was constructed in two phases: the first phase was fully completed in 1959, with a tower block extension officially opened in 1970. Previously, the library had existed across two rooms in the Cohen Building, run by Agnes Cuming from its opening in 1929 until 1955. During the 1950s and 1960s a considerable number of academic buildings were built, including the Larkin and Wilberforce Buildings (originally given other names). The 'Martin Plan' of 1967, Sir Leslie Martin was the university architect, envisaged a campus with its tallest buildings in the centre surrounded by buildings diminishing in height towards the perimeter. In the course of the 1960s most of the departments housed in temporary structures were moved into new purpose-built premises. However, Biochemistry was still partially located in a 'hut' to the rear of the Venn building into the early 1980s. This early phase of expansion through building ended in 1974, after this year there was to be no further academic building construction on the campus until 1996. However, student numbers doubled in this period, with the university becoming highly efficient in using its existing building stock.

=== Liquid crystal technology ===
In 1972 George Gray and Ken Harrison created room-temperature stable liquid crystals in the university chemistry laboratories, which were an immediate success in the electronics industry and consumer products. This led to Hull becoming the first university to be awarded the Queen's Award for Technological Achievement for the joint-development of the long-lasting materials that made liquid crystal displays possible.

=== Expansion in the 21st century ===
In 2000 the university bought the site of University College Scarborough on Filey Road, Scarborough, plus two linked buildings on the same road. This became the University of Hull Scarborough Campus.

A further significant expansion took place in 2003, when the buildings of the former Humberside University campus, which were situated immediately adjacent to Hull University's main campus, were purchased. The acquisition increased the size of the Cottingham Road campus by more than a third. It was the largest single act of expansion in the history of the university. Hull University fully occupied the newly acquired premises in the 2005 academic year; the area becoming the university's West Campus. The site now houses the Hull York Medical School and the relocated business school, which is located in three of the most prominent buildings – Wharfe, Derwent and Esk.

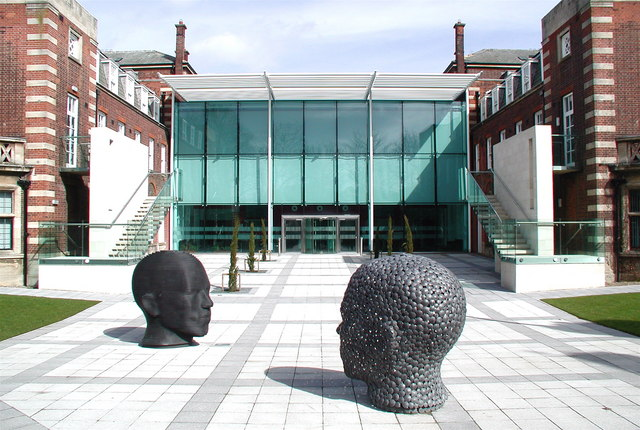
'Moving Matter' by Joseph Hillier

In 2012, the university began the ambitious refurbishment of the Brynmor Jones Library, a £28 million project to transform the seven-storey former workplace of Philip Larkin, into a learning hub suitable for contemporary student needs. The project was completed in 2015.

=== Hull History Centre ===
The Hull History Centre, which opened in 2010, is located in a new building on Worship Street in Hull city centre. It unites the holdings of Hull City Library's Local Studies collections and Hull University's archives and is run in partnership between the City Library and University Library.

=== City of Culture 2017 ===
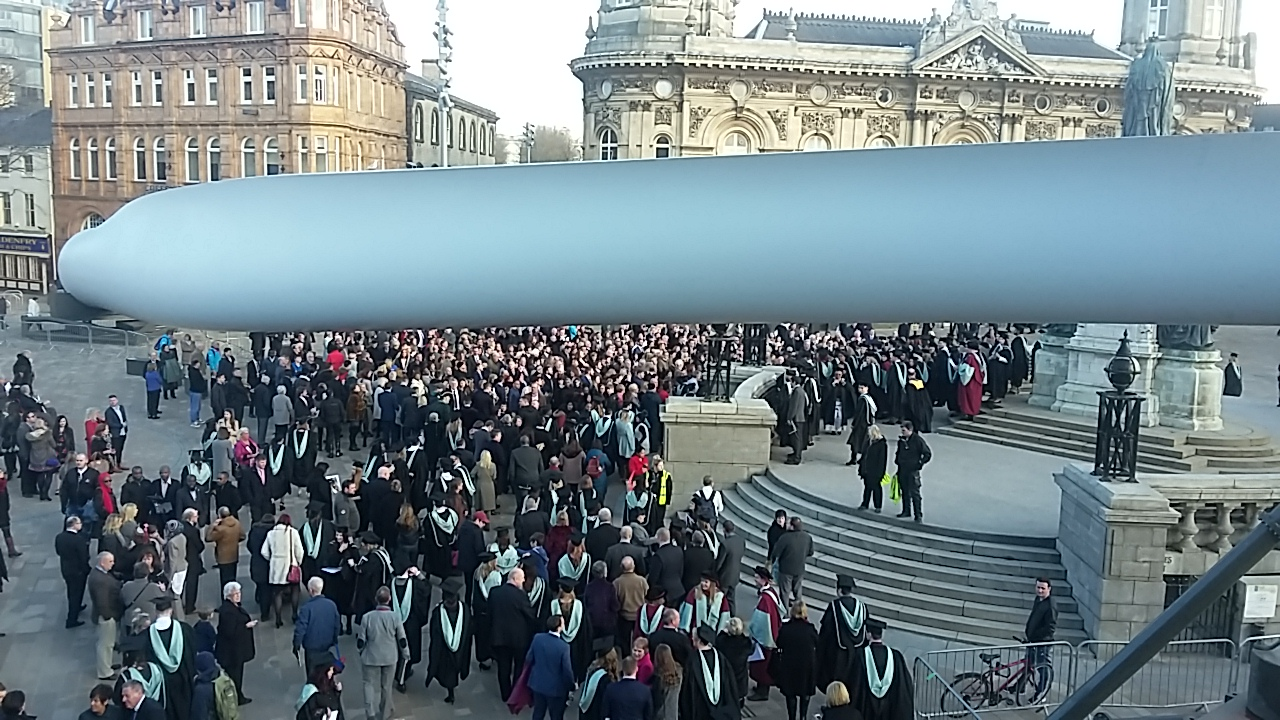
Graduates from a ceremony at the University of Hull gather outside Hull City Hall under the installation 'Blade', part of the Hull UK City of Culture 2017 celebrations

The university was a principal partner of the city's bid to become UK City of Culture in 2017. As well as being involved in the planning and preparation of the bid, the university and its staff and students have been involved in many of the events of the year. For example, during the initial three-month season, Hull Maritime Museum displayed a multimedia installation depicting a Bowhead whale The installation was designed by students from Hull School of Art and Design with music by students from Hull University. The opening event of the whole year, from 1–7 January, included a multimedia projection called Arrivals and Departures which was greatly influenced by the work of Dr Nick Evans on migration patterns into and through Hull. The installation was projected onto The Deep using stop-frame animation, image and sound.

=== Staff cuts and restructuring ===
In June 2024, University of Hull Vice-Chancellor Professor David Petley announced plans to cut up to 150 jobs (14% of the workforce) in response to a reduction in international student applications. The number of redundancies was later reduced to 127.

In November 2024, it was announced that the university would close its chemistry department and that the number of schools would be reduced from 17 to 11.

On 10 December 2025, Professor David Petley stepped down as Vice-Chancellor and subsequently became Vice-Chancellor of Nottingham Trent University.

== Campuses ==
The main campus is located in a residential district of North Hull on Cottingham Road. The university had a smaller campus in Scarborough on the North Yorkshire coast.

Hull University is a campus university; though situated in a city, its main campus is in a suburban rather than urban district. The main campus occupies a single, clearly defined site and is self-contained in regard to catering and entertainment for students and staff. Most of the major features of the campus are described in the 'history' section above; in addition, the campus has a large Students' Union building, which is often described as one of the finest in the country, and extensive playing fields and other sports facilities. The large village of Cottingham on Hull's north-western outskirts housed for many years some of the university-owned student accommodation, although none are used for this purpose now.

The campus features a concert venue, Middleton Hall, which re-opened after refurbishment in 2016. The building originally opened in 1967 and was designed by Leslie Martin, it was Grade II listed in 2014 alongside the Larkin Building.

=== London Study Centre ===
In May 2024, the University of Hull, in collaboration with the Cambridge Education Group, inaugurated the London Study Centre, offering students the opportunity to pursue University of Hull programmes in the capital. Located in Bloomsbury, central London, the Centre initially provides a selection of business-focused postgraduate programmes, including MSc Business Management MSc Logistics and Supply Chain Management MSc Digital Marketing and Advertising.

=== University College Scarborough ===
University of Hull: Scarborough Campus was a satellite campus of the university located in Scarborough, North Yorkshire, attended by approximately 2,000 students. Formerly a higher education institution offering BSc and BA degrees, the building was acquired by the University of Hull in 2000, offering Education courses, particularly at a primary level, as well as courses in Marine Biology, Digital Media, Music Technology Theatre Studies, Tourism Management, and a number of Business and English courses.

Scarborough ran somewhat independently of the main campus in Hull, with its own branch of the Hull University Union. Graduation ceremonies took place within Scarborough's historic Spa Complex. The campus also contained basic amenities for study, such as computer labs, performance studios for students of Theatre and Dance related courses as well as dedicated music suites in the "Filey Road Studios" building opposite the campus.

In April 2014, the university released a statement that Scarborough Campus was "not sustainable in the medium to long term", and in June held a public consultation outlining the future of the campus with a new academic model in mind. In March 2015, it was revealed that the Hull College Group were the university's "preferred partners for taking forward the Scarborough Campus". The college returned to its former name, "University College Scarborough" and became part of the Hull College group, but still hosts programmes from both Hull College and the University of Hull.

=== External Validation ===
Since September 2013, all undergraduate and postgraduate degree courses at the Leeds Conservatoire are validated by the University of Hull. Beginning in 1993 Hull has validated Masters of Education programmes for the Christian Leadership in Education Office (CLEO), in Cork (and from 1993 to 1996 in Limerick), Ireland. Hull also validates a number of programmes in Rotherham College, Dearne Vally College, and other RNN Group locations. From 1972 until 1982 the University of Hull validated programmes at the postgraduate Irish School of Ecumenics.

== Academic profile ==
=== Faculty of Science and Engineering ===
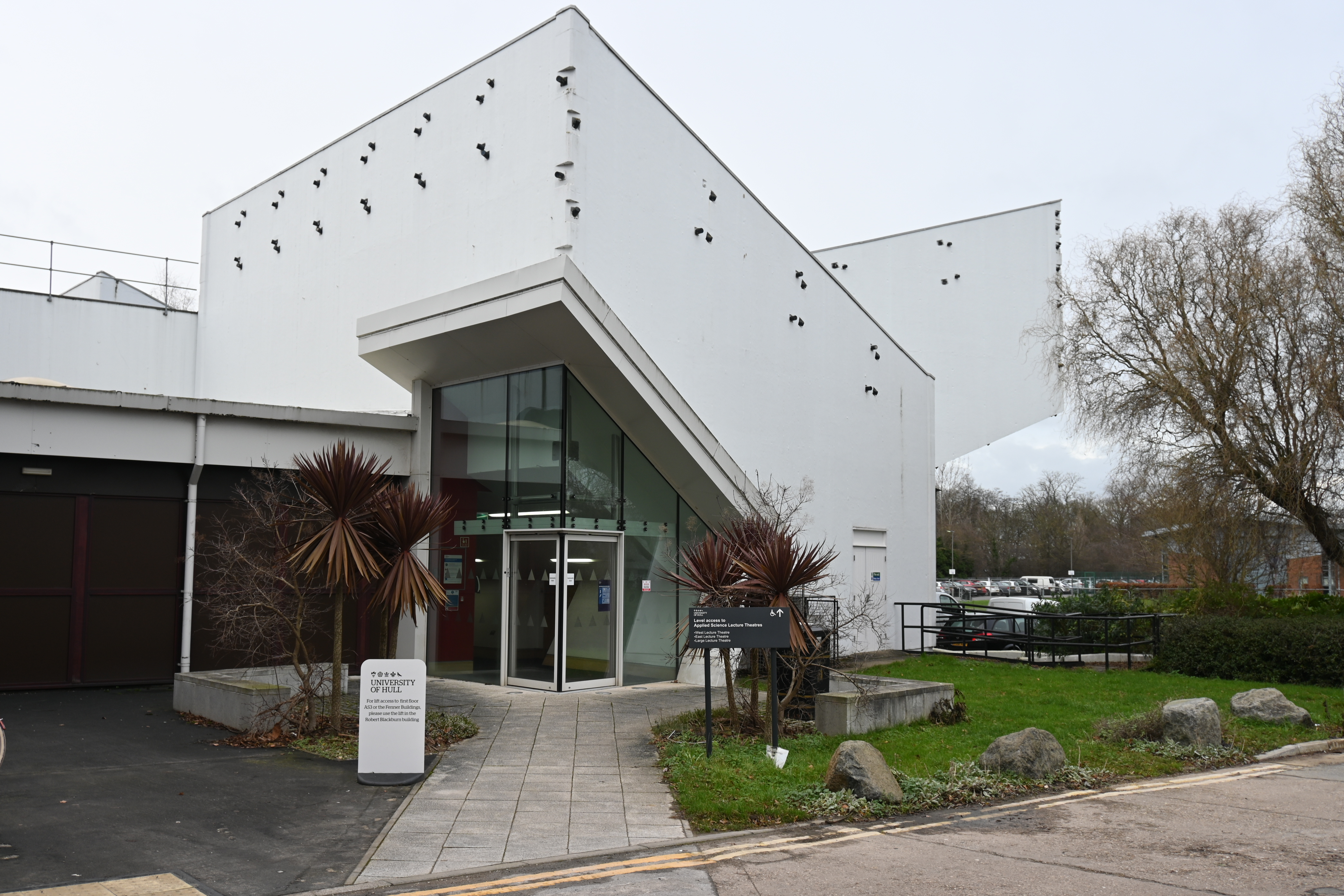
Lecture theatres attached to the Applied Sciences Building

- School of Engineering & Computer Science: Chemical Engineering, Civil Engineering, Electrical & Electronic Engineering, Computer Science, Mechanical Engineering, Medical & Biomedical Engineering
- School of Environmental Sciences: Environmental Science, Geography & Geology
- School of Natural Sciences: Biological Sciences, Chemistry, Mathematics, Physics & Astrophysics

Until recently, there were two faculties, the 'Faculty of Applied Science & Technology' and the 'Faculty of Science & the Environment', before becoming the 'Faculty of Science' and later being renamed to the 'Faculty of Science and Engineering'.

Notable centres for research include the Hull Immersive Visualisation Environment (HIVE), the Institute for Estuarine and Coastal Studies (IECS), the E.A. Milne Centre for Astrophysics (MCA) and the G W Gray Centre for Advanced Materials.

A new biomedical research facility will bring academics from biology and chemistry together and will include Positron Emission Tomography with CT scanning (PET-CT) and two mini cyclotrons. Two new research groups will be based at the facility, called the Allam building: one focusing on cardiovascular and metabolic research and the other on cancer.

=== Faculty of Arts, Culture & Education ===
- School of The Arts: Drama; Film & Digital Media; Music
- School of Education: Education, Teaching & Childhood Studies; Youth & Community Development
- School of Criminology, Sociology and Policing: Criminology; Sociology; Professional Policing
- School of Humanities: American Studies; History; English & Creative Writing

Most social science and law-related department housed in the refurbished Wilberforce Building. Includes the School of Arts and New Media at Scarborough, formed in August 2006. Drama is taught in the Gulbenkian Centre, including the Donald Roy Theatre. History, English, Languages and Music are in the Larkin Building.

==== Gulbenkian Centre ====
The Gulbenkian Centre, opened in 1969 as the "first completely new building for the teaching of drama at a British university", received £50,000 of funding towards its construction from the Gulbenkian Foundation.

The building, a red brick and concrete octagon, was designed by Peter Moro and Partners, a practice with experience from Nottingham Playhouse, and was listed as Grade II in 2015. The Donald Roy Theatre within the centre was designed for flexibility and ease of changeover between different seating arrangements, it was named after the then head of Hull's Department of Drama (then only the third of its kind in the country).

=== Faculty of Health Sciences ===
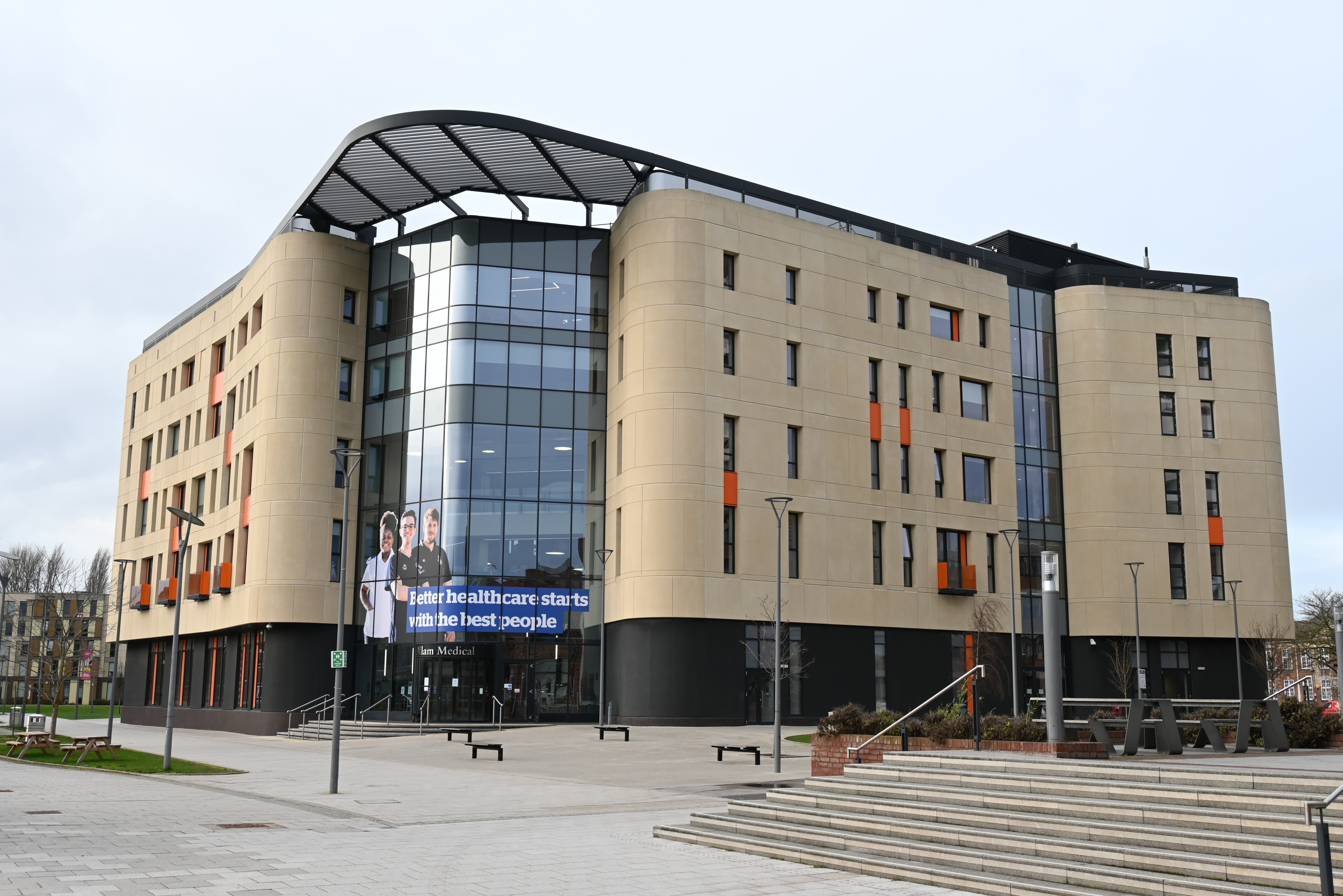
The Allam Medical Building, opened in 2017

- Hull York Medical School
- School of Health Care: Paramedic Science, Nursing & Midwifery; Diagnostic Radiography; Operating Departmental Practice
- School of Psychology and Social Work: Psychology; Clinical Psychology; Social Work
- School of Sport, Exercise & Rehabilitation Sciences: Sport, Health and Exercise Science; Allied Health Professions

Based in the Calder, Aire and Dearne buildings in the west campus. Allam Medical Building contains mock clinical areas, wards, an operating theatre and a midwifery suite, within a simulated environment.

==== Hull York Medical School ====
Teaching of medicine began in October 2003 on the west campus. Medical students receive joint degrees from the universities of Hull and York. The school includes the 'International Society for the Study of Cough' based at Castle Hill hospital on Castle Road in Cottingham. Third and fourth year students train also at hospitals in Scunthorpe, Grimsby, and Scarborough.

==== Postgraduate Medical Institute ====
Established in 1994, one of the PGMI's sections is the Yorkshire Cancer Research-funded Centre for Magnetic Resonance Investigations which is actively engaged in researching the application of magnetic resonance imaging and magnetic resonance spectroscopy techniques to cancer research.

=== Faculty of Business, Law & Politics ===
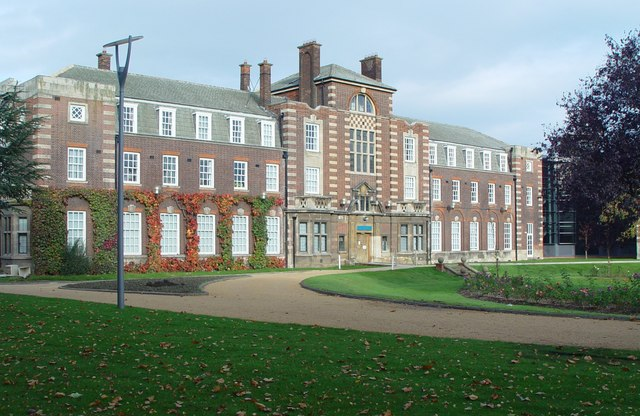
The Esk Building – part of the Business School

- Hull University Business School: Accounting & Finance, Business & Management, Economics & Business Economics, Marketing, Logistics & Supply Chain Management
- School of Law & Politics: Law, Politics & International Relations

Established in August 1999, Hull University Business School has around 3,500 students from over 100 countries. Students are taught at the Hull campus, with additional MBA students taught overseas. On the Hull campus, the school occupies refurbished listed buildings on the West Campus which were opened in 2005. The Logistics Institute was completed in September 2007, and officially launched in March 2008.

In 2011, following accreditation by the AMBA, EQUIS and AACSB, the business school became the first in Yorkshire, and the 13th in the UK, to achieve "triple crown accreditation" status. As of 2023, the school remains accredited by AMBA and AACSB.

=== Wilberforce Institute ===
The Wilberforce Institute, patron Archbishop Emeritus Desmond Tutu, for the study of Slavery and Emancipation (WISE) is located in Oriel Chambers on the High Street in Hull's Old Town, adjacent to Wilberforce House. It undertakes graduate research in the field of slavery and human rights.

=== Maritime Historical Studies Centre ===
The university's Maritime Historical Studies Centre provides a BA in History and Maritime History, an online Diploma in Maritime History and PhD research in Maritime History. The centre is located in the Hull's Old Town in Blaydes House. Its director is David J Starkey.

=== International collaboration ===
The university is an active member of the University of the Arctic. UArctic is an international cooperative network based in the Circumpolar Arctic region, consisting of more than 200 universities, colleges, and other organizations with an interest in promoting education and research in the Arctic region.

The university also participates in UArctic's mobility program north2north. The aim of that program is to enable students of member institutions to study in different parts of the North.

Since 2016 the university has hosted a Confucius Institute.

=== Rankings ===
Rankings
National rankings
- Complete (2027): 64
- Guardian (2027): 71
- Times / Sunday Times (2027): 50

Global rankings
- ARWU (2026): 801–900
- QS (2027): 575=
- THE (2026): 551–600

The University of Hull is rated Gold in the Teaching Excellence Framework. In the ARWU 2026 rankings, the University of Hull is placed in the 801 - 900 bracket globally, which ranks it between 48th and 55th nationally in the United Kingdom. In the "Times Higher Education World University" 2027 rankings, the University of Hull is placed in the 551–600 bracket globally, while it ranks 53rd nationally in the United Kingdom.

== Student life ==
=== Students' Union ===
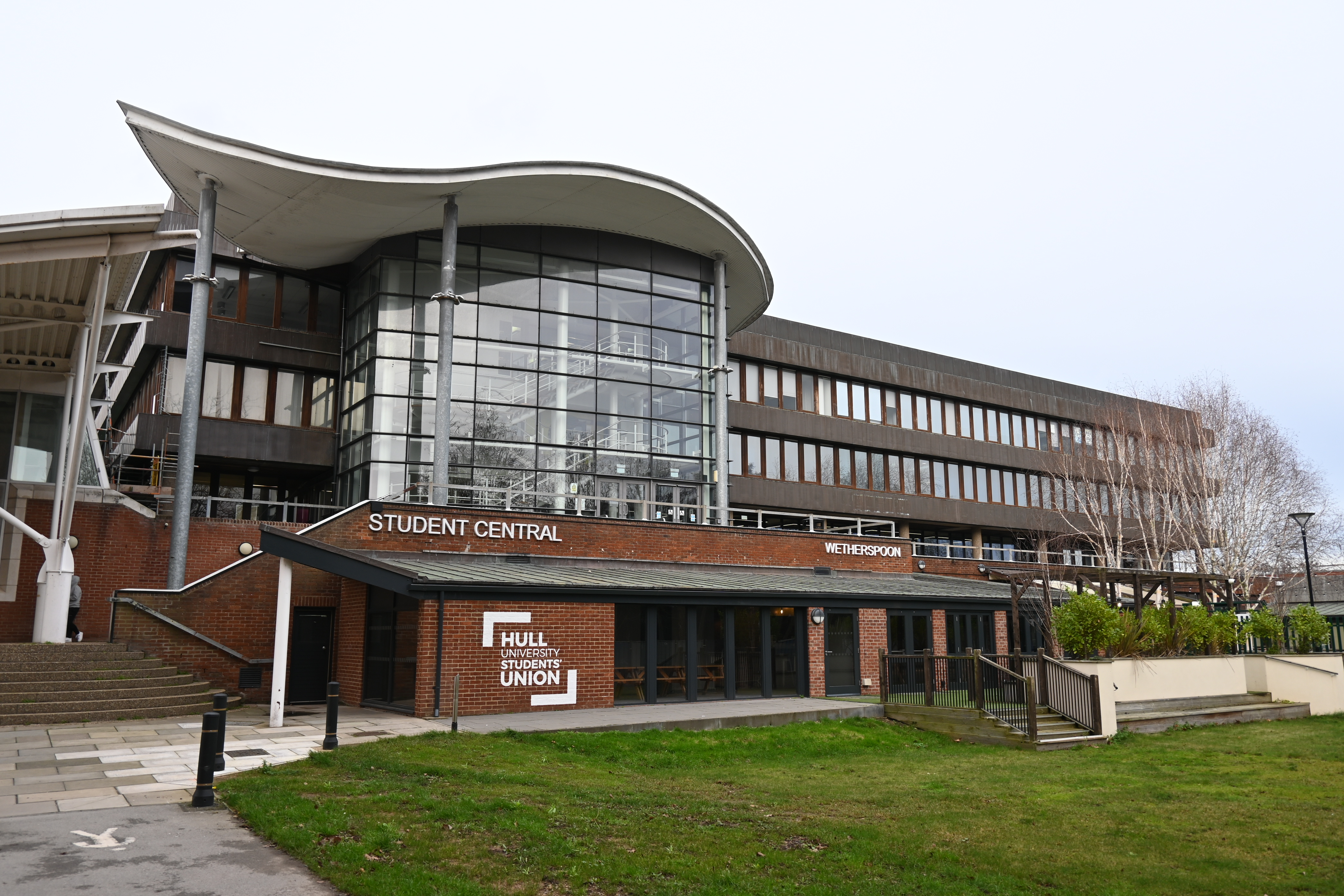
Hull University Union

Hull University Union is the main provider of student catering, services and entertainment on the university campus. It has over 100 student societies affiliated to it, and also runs a volunteering and charity hub. Approximately 50 sports clubs are affiliated to the Students Union's Athletic Union, many of which compete in BUCS national university leagues. The University Union was voted Students' Union of the Year in July 2012.

The student union building comprises an on-site nightclub as well as a number of bars and catering outlets. The building also houses a shop, advice centre, and the university-run careers service.

There is a monthly student newspaper called The Hullfire, an online television station called Hullfire TV and a student radio station which broadcasts from the union building called JAM Radio which relaunched in 2018.

=== Student accommodation ===
The university has three main halls of residence on campus:

- Taylor Court is located next to the Wilberforce building and houses 288 students in en-suite rooms with shared kitchens.
- The Courtyard opened in 2016 and is situated next to the Student Union, it houses 562 students in en-suite rooms as well as some rooftop apartments.
- Westfield Court partially opened in 2018, with a full opening in 2019 on the site of the former medical school. It houses a total of 1462 students in a mix of single and cluster flats.

In the recent past there were halls of residence in Cottingham at The Lawns, seven halls which could hold around 1,000 students. In March 2019 it was announced that The Lawns would close. Historically, the main concentration of 'traditional' (catered) university halls of residence was in Cottingham. These comprised: Cleminson Hall (closed in 2004), Needler Hall (closed in 2016), and Thwaite Hall (closed in 2017). Ferens Hall was originally a traditional hall, but was later amalgamated with the adjoining Lawns halls. Prior to the mid-1980s, Cleminson and Thwaite halls were exclusively for female residents, Needler and Ferens exclusively for male residents. There was a former on-campus student residence, Loten Hall (now known as the Loten Building).

Student housing is based primarily in the terraced streets around the university campus itself, as well as around the Newland Avenue and Beverley Road areas of the city.

== Notable alumni and academics ==
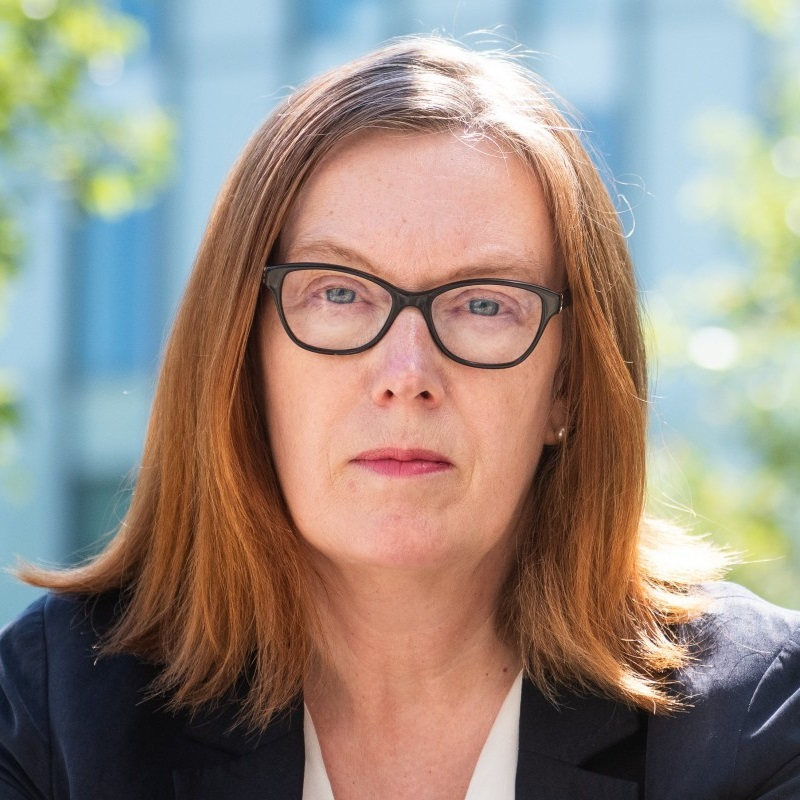
Vaccinologist Dame Sarah Gilbert (PhD, 1986) was the Project Lead on the Oxford–AstraZeneca COVID-19 vaccine

Alumni of the University of Hull are especially prominent in the fields of politics, academia, journalism and drama. They include former MP and later Deputy Prime Minister Lord Prescott (John Prescott), former MP and Deputy Leader of the Labour Party Lord Hattersley (Roy Hattersley), former Labour Party Leader in the European Parliament Richard Corbett, and former Labour MP and deputy leader Tom Watson, former Labour MP and author Chris Mullin, vaccinologist Dame Sarah Gilbert who was Project Lead on the Oxford–AstraZeneca COVID-19 vaccine, social scientist Lord Giddens (Anthony Giddens), poet Roger McGough, journalist John McCarthy, film director, playwright and screenwriter the late Anthony Minghella.

One of the 2021 joint Nobel laureates for economics was Hull graduate, Guido Imbens.

The university's Brynmor Jones Library was the workplace of the poet Philip Larkin who served as its Head Librarian for over thirty years. The Philip Larkin Society organises activities in remembrance of Larkin including the Larkin 25 festival which was organised during 2010 in partnership with the university. Andrew Motion, another prominent poet, and former poet laureate, also worked at the university. Prominent former academics include: marine biologist Sir Alister Hardy, architect Sir Leslie Martin, mathematician and historian Jacob Bronowski and novelist Sir Malcolm Bradbury.

=== List of principals and vice-chancellors ===
Principals

- 1926–1935: Arthur E. Morgan
- 1935–1954: John H. Nicholson

Vice-Chancellors

- 1954–1956: John H. Nicholson
- 1956–1972: Sir Brynmor Jones
- 1972–1979: Stanley R. Dennison
- 1979–1985: Sir Roy Marshall
- 1985–1991: William Taylor
- 1991–1999: David Dilks
- 1999–2009: David Drewry
- 2009–2017: Calie Pistorius
- 2017–2022: Susan Lea
- 2022–2025: David Petley
- 2026–present: Tom Lawson

== See also ==
- Armorial of UK universities
- Civic university
- List of universities in the UK
- Listed buildings in Kingston upon Hull (University Ward)

== Bibliography ==
- Bamford, T. W. (1978). The University of Hull: the First Fifty Years. Published for the University of Hull by Oxford University Press. ISBN 0197134327.
