= Nolan (given name) =

Nolan is a male given name of Irish origin meaning "champion" and "strong one".

== People with the given name ==
=== A ===
- Nolan Allaer (born 2002), American racing driver
- Nolan Allan (born 2003), Canadian ice hockey player
- Nolan D. Archibald (born 1943), American corporate executive
- Nolan Arenado (born 1991), American baseball player
- Nolan Arendse (born 1968), South African darts player
- Nolan B. Aughenbaugh (1928–2017), American professor

=== B ===
- Nolan Baumgartner (born 1976), Canadian ice hockey player
- Nolan Rice Best (1871–1930), American editor
- Nolan Bushnell (born 1943), American entrepreneur

=== C ===
- Nolan Carroll (born 1987), American football player
- Nolan Clarke (born 1948), Dutch cricketer
- Nolan Cooney (born 1996), American football player
- Nolan Cromwell (born 1955), American football coach
- Nolan Crouse (born 1953), Canadian politician

=== D ===
- Nolan Dyck, Canadian politician

=== E ===
- Nolan Evans (1885–1948), English footballer

=== F ===
- Nolan Flemmer (1938–2018), South African cricketer
- Nolan Fontana (born 1991), American baseball player
- Nolan Foote (born 2000), American-Canadian ice hockey player
- Nolan Franz (born 1959), American football player
- Nolan Frese (born 1992), American football player
- Nolan Frizzelle (1921–2013), American politician
- Nolan Gerard Funk (born 1986), Canadian actor

=== G ===
- Nolan Gallagher, American sports executive
- Nolan Gasser (born 1964), American composer
- Nolan Godfrey (born 1981), American lacrosse player
- Nolan Gould (born 1998), American actor
- Nolan Gorman (born 2000), American baseball player
- Nolan Gottlieb (born 1982), American basketball player

=== H ===
- Nolan Bailey Harmon (1892–1993), American bishop
- Nolan Hansen (born 1998), American YouTuber
- Nolan Harrison (born 1969), American football player
- Nolan Hauser (born 2005), American football player
- Nolan Heavenor (born 1982), Canadian lacrosse player
- Nolan Hemmings (born 1970), English actor
- Nolan Henderson (born 1998), American football player
- Nolan Henke (born 1964), American golfer
- Nolan Hickman (born 2003), American basketball player
- Nolan Hoffman (born 1985), South African cyclist
- Nolan Hoffman (baseball) (born 1997), American baseball player

=== J ===
- Nolan Jones (born 1998), American baseball player

=== K ===
- Nolan Karras (born 1944), American politician
- Nolan Kasper (born 1989), American alpine skier
- Nolan Keeley (born 1951), English footballer

=== L ===
- Nolan Laufenberg (born 1999), American football player
- Nolan Leary (1889–1987), American actor
- Nolan Luhn (1921–2011), American football player

=== M ===
- Nolan MacMillan (born 1990), Canadian American football player
- Nolan Mbemba (born 1995), French footballer
- Nolan McCarty (born 1967), American political scientist
- Nolan McDonald (born 1977), Canadian ice hockey player
- Nolan McKenzie (born 1969), Guyanese cricketer
- Nolan McLean (born 2001), American baseball player
- Nolan Mettetal (1945–2020), American politician
- Nolan Miller (1933–2012), American fashion designer
- Nolan Miller (writer) (1907–2006), American author
- Nolan Moyle (born 1999), American ice hockey player

=== N ===
- Nolan Ngewakl (born 2008), Northern Marianan footballer
- Nolan Norris (born 2005), American soccer player
- Nolan North (born 1970), American voice actor

=== P ===
- Nolan Patrick (born 1998), Canadian hockey player
- Nolan Pope, American stock car racing driver
- Nolan Porter (1949–2021), American singer-songwriter
- Nolan Pratt (born 1975), Canadian ice hockey player

=== Q ===
- Nolan Quinn (born 1983), Canadian politician

=== R ===
- Nolan Reimold (born 1983), American baseball player
- Nolan "Yeti" Reising (born 2009), American football superstar
- Nolan Richardson (born 1941), American basketball coach
- Nolan Richardson III (1964–2012), American basketball coach
- Nolan Roux (born 1988), French footballer
- Nolan Rucci (born 2002), American football player
- Nolan Ryan (born 1947), American baseball player

=== S ===
- Nolan Schaefer (born 1980), Canadian ice hockey player
- Nolan Schanuel (born 2002), American baseball player
- Nolan Schubart (born 2004), American baseball player
- Nolan Seegert (born 1992), German ice skater
- Nolan Shaheed (born 1949), American musician
- Nolan Siegel (born 2004), American racing driver
- Nolan Sipe, American songwriter
- Nolan Smith (born 1988), American basketball player
- Nolan Smith (American football) (born 2001), American football player
- Nolan Sotillo (born 1994), American singer-songwriter
- Nolan Stevens (born 1996), American ice hockey player
- Nolan Swancy (1896–1964), American baseball player

=== T ===
- Nolan Tash (born 1977), Trinidadian volleyball player
- Nolan Teasley (born 1984), American football executive
- Nolan Thiessen (born 1980), Canadian curler
- Nolan Thomas (born 1966), American musician and photographer
- Nolan Traoré (born 2006), French basketball player
- Nolan Tupaea, New Zealand rugby league footballer
- Nolan Turner (born 1997), American football player

=== V ===
- Nolan Van Way (1931–2016), American baritone

=== W ===
- Nolan R. Walborn (1944–2018), American astronomer
- Nolan Wallach (born 1940), American mathematician
- Nolan Watson (born 1979), Canadian businessman
- Nolan Watson (baseball) (born 1997), American baseball player
- Nolan West (born 1990), American politician
- Nolan White (1931–2002), American racing driver
- Nolan Williams (disambiguation), multiple people
- Nolan Winter (born 2005), American basketball player
- Nolan Wirth (born 1995), Canadian soccer player

=== Y ===
- Nolan T. Yelich (born 1942), American librarian
- Nolan Yonkman (born 1981), Canadian ice hockey player
- Nolan Young, Canadian politician

== See also ==
- Nolan (surname), a page for people with the surname "Nolan"
- Nolan (disambiguation), a disambiguation page for "Nolan"
