= Forlidas Pond =

Round frozen pond in Queen Elizabeth Land, Antarctica

- Location within Antarctica
- Location: Antarctica
- Coordinates: 82°27′S 51°21′W
- Type: frozen pond
- Max. length: 100 metres (110 yd)
- Max. width: 100 metres (110 yd)

Forlidas Pond is a round frozen pond, 100 metres (110 yd) in diameter, lying in a morainal valley east of the north end of Forlidas Ridge, Dufek Massif, Queen Elizabeth Land, Antarctica. The only pond in the northern Pensacola Mountains, it is of much interest to biologists. The pond was discovered and briefly investigated in December 1957 by a United States – International Geophysical Year party from Ellsworth Station. The name is in association with Forlidas Ridge and was suggested by Arthur B. Ford of the United States Geological Survey following geological work in the area, 1978–79.

== Antarctic Specially Protected Area ==
Forlidas Pond, with Davis Valley some 500 metres (1,600 ft) away, and other adjacent ice-free valleys, forms one of the most southerly ‘dry valley’ systems on the continent and has exceptional scientific value for the interpretation of past glacial events and climate in this part of Antarctica. The site is protected under the Antarctic Treaty System as Antarctic Specially Protected Area (ASPA) No.119.
