= Lexington Table =

Plateau in Antarctica

- Location within Antarctica

Geography
- Range coordinates: 83°05′S 49°45′W
- Parent range: Pensacola Mountains

The Lexington Table (83°05′S 49°45′W) is a high, flat, snow-covered plateau, about 15 nautical miles (28 km; 17 mi) long and 10 nautical miles (19 km; 12 mi) wide, standing just north of Kent Gap and Saratoga Table in the Forrestal Range, Pensacola Mountains, Antarctica.

== Discovery and name ==
The Lexington Table was discovered and photographed on January 13, 1956 on a transcontinental nonstop flight by personnel of United States Navy Operation Deep Freeze I from McMurdo Sound to the vicinity of the Weddell Sea and return. It was named by the United States Advisory Committee on Antarctic Names (US-ACAN) for the USS Lexington of 1926, one of the first large aircraft carriers of the United States Navy.

== Location ==
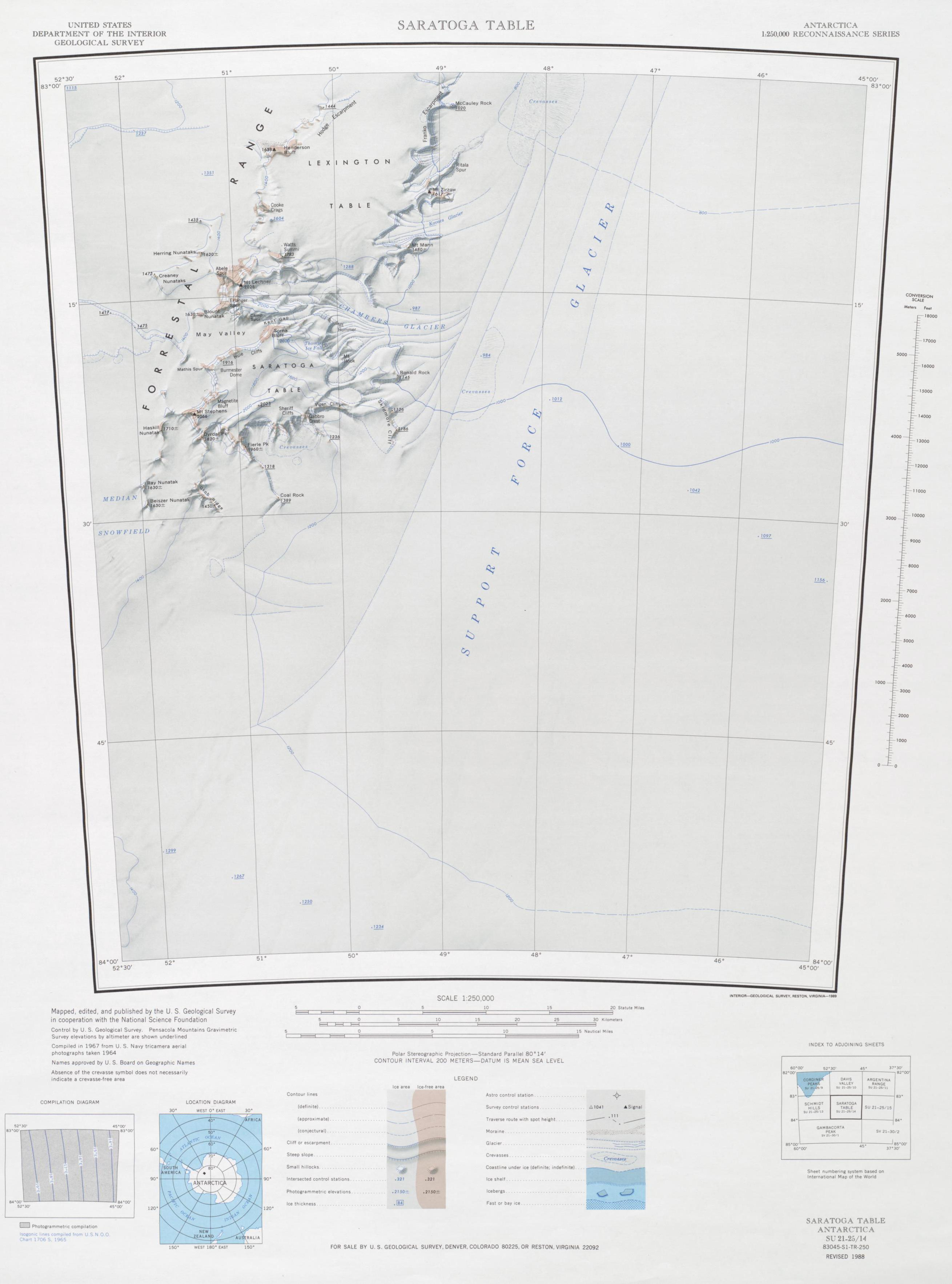
Saratoga Table in northwest near top of map

The Lexington Table is north of the Saratoga Table, from which it is separated by the May Valley, Kent Gap and Chambers Glacier. The Support Force Glacier runs along its eastern side. Features, clockwise from the northeast, include Franko Escarpment, McCauley Rock, Ritala Spur, Mount Zirzow, Kovacs Glacier, Mount Mann, Watts Summit, Cooke Crags, Henderson Bluff and Hodge Escarpment. Features to the southwest include Camp Spur, Mount Lechner, Erlanger Spur, Blount Nunatak, Abele Spur, Creaney Nunataks and Herring Nunataks.

== Features ==
=== Franko Escarpment ===
83°03′S 49°05′W. A mostly snow-covered escarpment that runs north–south for 4 nautical miles (7.4 km; 4.6 mi) and forms the northeast edge of Lexington Table. Named by US-AC AN in 1979 for Stephen J. Franko, Grants and Contracts Officer, National Science Foundation, from 1967, with responsibility for all contracts in support of the USARP.

=== McCauley Rock ===
83°02′S 48°53′W. A rock, 1,020 metres (3,350 ft) high, situated just off the east edge of Lexington Table, 6 nautical miles (11 km; 6.9 mi) north of Mount Zirzow. Mapped by USGS from surveys and United States Navy air photos, 1956-66. Named by US-ACAN for Clyde J. McCauley, United States Navy seaman at Ellsworth Station, winter 1957.

=== Ritala Spur ===
83°07′S 48°57′W. A mostly snow-covered spur extending northeast from the east side of Lexington Table. Named by US-ACAN in 1979 after Keith D. Ritala, USARP geophysicist who conducted gravity research at South Pole Station, winter party 1972.

=== Mount Zirzow ===
83°08′S 49°06′W. A mountain, 1,615 metres (5,299 ft) high, standing 4 nautical miles (7.4 km; 4.6 mi) north of Mount Mann on the east edge of Lexington Table. Mapped by USGS from surveys and United States Navy air photos, 1956-66. Named by US-ACAN for Commander Charles F. Zirzow, United States Navy, Assistant Chief of Staff to the Commander, United States Naval Support Force, Antarctica, 1966-67.

=== Mount Mann ===
83°12′S 49°20′W. A mountain, 1,680 metres (5,510 ft) high, standing on the southeast edge of Lexington Table, 4 nautical miles (7.4 km; 4.6 mi) south of Mount Zirzow. Mapped by USGS from surveys and United States Navy air photos, 1956-66. Named by US-ACAN for Captain Edward K. Mann, United States Air Force, an assistant in the Research Division of the United States Naval Support Force, Antarctica, 1966-68.

=== Watts Summit ===
83°12′S 50°31′W. A peak rising to 1,785 metres (5,856 ft) high in the southwest corner of Lexington Table. Mapped by USGS in 1967 from ground surveys and United States Navy aerial photographs taken 1964. Named in 1979 by US-ACAN after Raymond D. Watts, USGS geophysicist who worked in the Forrestal Range and Dufek Massif, 1978-79.

=== Cooke Crags ===
83°10′S 50°43′W. Rock crags on the ice slope between Henderson Bluff and Mount Lechner on the west side of Lexington Table. The area was mapped by USGS from surveys and United States Navy aerial photographs, 1956-66. Named by US-ACAN in 1979 after James E. Cooke, USGS geophysicist who worked in Forrestal Range and Dufek Massif, 1978-79.

=== Henderson Bluff ===
83°05′S 50°35′W. A rock bluff, 1,660 metres (5,450 ft) high, along the west side of Lexington Table 9 nautical miles (17 km; 10 mi) north of Mount Lechner, in the Forrestal Range, Pensacola Mountains. Mapped by USGS from surveys and United States Navy air photos, 1956-66. Named by US-ACAN for John R. Henderson, geophysicist in the Pensacola Mountains, 1965-66.

=== Hodge Escarpment ===
83°03′S 50°11′W. An escarpment to the northeast of Henderson Bluff on the northwest side of Lexington Table. Named by US-ACAN for Steven M. Hodge, USGS geophysicist, who worked in the Dufek Massif and Forrestal Range, 1978-79.

== Southwest features ==
=== Camp Spur ===
83°16′S 50°50′W. A rock spur along the north wall of May Valley. Mapped by USGS from surveys and United States Navy air photos, 1956-66. Named by US-ACAN for Gary C. Camp, aerographer at Ellsworth Station, winter 1957.

=== Mount Lechner ===
83°14′S 50°55′W. A prominent mountain, 2,030 metres (6,660 ft) high, surmounting the southwest end of Saratoga Table. Mapped by USGS from surveys and United States Navy air photos, 1956-66. Named by US-ACAN for Major Ralph C. Lechner, United States Army, airlift coordinator on the staff of the Commander, United States Naval Support Force, Antarctica, 1964-66.

=== Erlanger Spur ===
83°16′S 51°06′W. A rock spur from the southwest extremity of Lexington Table. The spur lies south of Abele Spur and extends west toward Blount Nunatak. Named by US-ACAN, at the suggestion of USGS geologist Arthur B. Ford, after George L. Erlanger, electronics specialist with Geophysical Survey Systems Inc., who worked with the USARP-CRREL survey in the Pensacola Mountains, 1973-74.

=== Blount Nunatak ===
83°16′S 51°19′W. A prominent nunatak, 1,630 metres (5,350 ft) high, standing 3 nautical miles (5.6 km; 3.5 mi) southwest of Mount Lechner. Discovered and photographed on January 13, 1956 during a United States Navy transcontinental nonstop plane flight from McMurdo Sound to Weddell Sea and return. Named by US-ACAN for Hartford E. Blount, aviation machinists mate with United States Navy Squadron VX during Operation Deep Freeze, 1956.

=== Abele Spur ===
83°13′S 51°05′W. A rock spur that descends west from Mount Lechner toward Herring Nunataks. Named by US-ACAN at the suggestion of Arthur B. Ford for Gunars Abele, civil engineer on the 1973-74 USARP-CRREL survey in this area.

=== Creaney Nunataks ===
83°14′S 51°43′W. Low nunataks lying southwest of Herring Nunataks and 5.5 nautical miles (10.2 km; 6.3 mi) west of Mount Lechner. Mapped by USGS from surveys and United States Navy air photos, 1956-66. Named by US-ACAN for David B. Creaney, aviation electrician at Ellsworth Station, winter 1957.

=== Herring Nunataks ===
83°12′S 51°22′W. Two prominent nunataks standing 3 nautical miles (5.6 km; 3.5 mi) northwest of Mount Lechner. Mapped by USGS from surveys and United States Navy air photos, 1956-66. Named by US-ACAN for Earl F. Herring, aviation storekeeper at Ellsworth Station, winter 1957.

== Sources ==
- Alberts, Fred G., ed. (1995), Geographic Names of the Antarctic (PDF) (2 ed.), United States Board on Geographic Names This article incorporates public domain material from websites or documents of the United States Board on Geographic Names.
- Saratoga Table, USGS: United States Geological Survey
- This article incorporates public domain material from websites or documents of the United States Geological Survey.
