= Mount Malville =

Mountain in Antarctica

- Location within Antarctica

Highest point
- Elevation: 1,030 m (3,380 ft)
- Coordinates: 82°44′S 48°10′W

Geography
- Location: (Antarctica) Pensacola Mountains
- Parent range: Forrestal Range

Mount Malville (82°44′S 48°10′W) is a mountain, 1,030 metres (3,380 ft) high, standing 5 nautical miles (9.3 km; 5.8 mi) southwest of Ackerman Nunatak in the northern part of the Forrestal Range, Pensacola Mountains, Antarctica.

== Mapping and name ==
Mount Malville was mapped by the United States Geological Survey (USGS) from surveys and United States Navy air photographs from 1956 to 1966. It was named by the United States Advisory Committee on Antarctic Names (US-ACAN) for J. McKim Malville, an auroral scientist at Ellsworth Station during the winter of 1957.

== Location ==
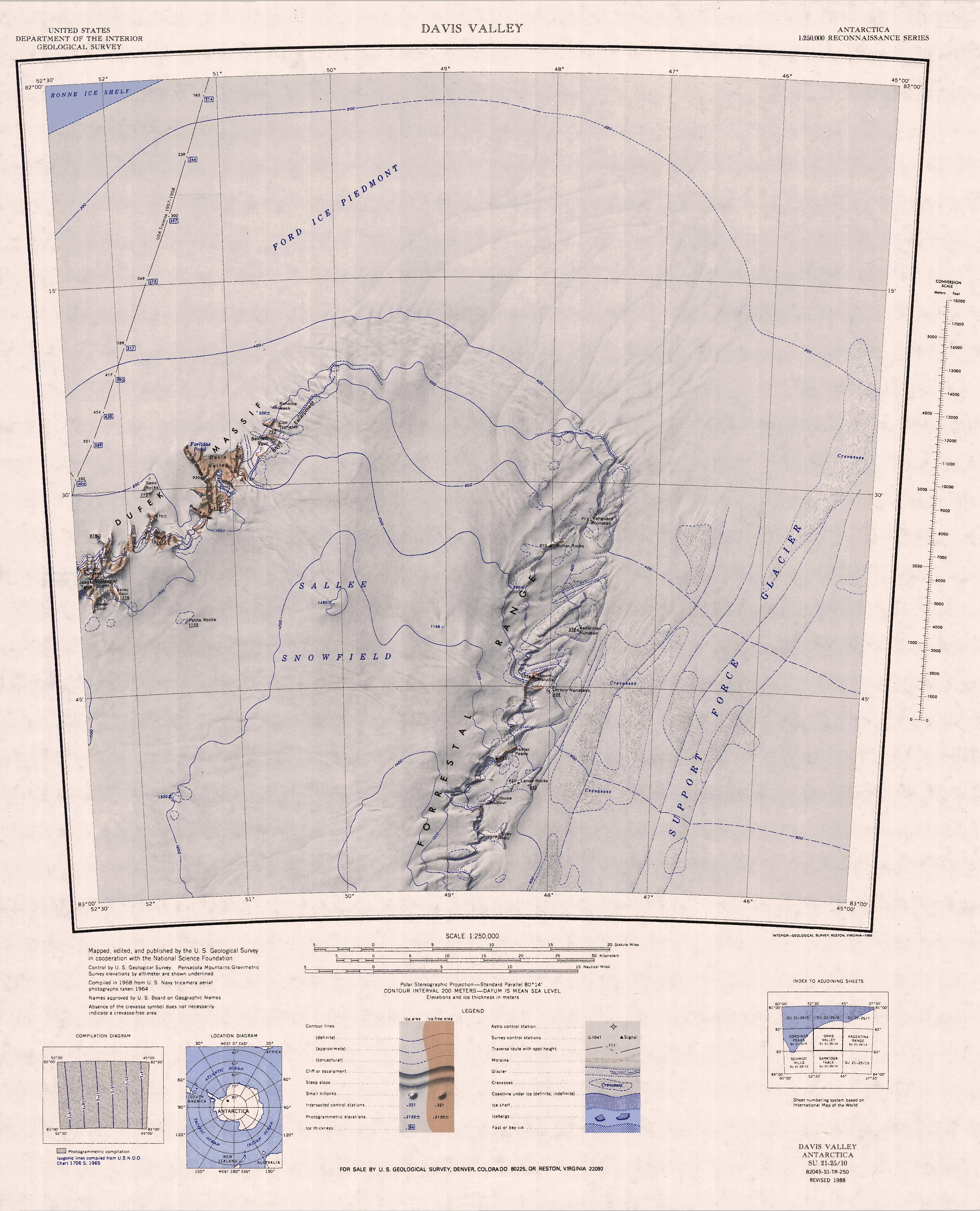
Forrestal Range in center, south of map. Mount Malville in center of this part of the range

Mount Malville is towards the north end of the Forrestal Range, which trends north-northeast between the Sallee Snowfield to the west and the Support Force Glacier to the east. It is north of the Kester Peaks. The Larson Nunataks are just to the east of Mount Malville. Features to the north include Ackerman Nunatak, Butler Rocks and Vanguard Nunatak.

== Nearby features ==
=== Larson Nunataks ===
82°45′S 48°00′W. A small cluster of nunataks lying along the east side of Forrestal Range, 1.5 nautical miles (2.8 km; 1.7 mi) southeast of Mount Malville. Mapped by USGS from surveys and United States Navy air photos, 1956-66. Named by US-AC AN for Larry R. Larson, aviation electronics technician at Ellsworth Station, winter 1957.

=== Ackerman Nunatak ===
82°41′S 47°45′W. An isolated nunatak, 655 metres (2,149 ft) high, standing 6.5 nautical miles (12.0 km; 7.5 mi) south-southeast of Butler Rocks. Mapped by USGS from surveys and United States Navy air photos, 1956-66. Named by US-ACAN for Thomas A. Ackerman, aerographer, Ellsworth Station winter party, 1957.

=== Butler Rocks ===
82°35′S 47°57′W. Two rock nunataks, 910 metres (2,990 ft) high, standing 2.5 nautical miles (4.6 km; 2.9 mi) southwest of Vanguard Nunatak. Mapped by USGS from surveys and United States Navy air photos, 1956-66. Named by US-ACAN for William A. Butler, aerographer, Ellsworth Station winter party, 1957.

=== Vanguard Nunatak ===
82°33′S 47°38′W. A conspicuous cone-shaped nunatak, 715 metres (2,346 ft) high, standing at the northern extremity of Forrestal Range. Mapped by USGS from surveys and United States Navy air photos, 1956-66. So named by US-ACAN for its prominent position at the north end of Forrestal Range.

== Sources ==
- Alberts, Fred G., ed. (1995), Geographic Names of the Antarctic (PDF) (2 ed.), United States Board on Geographic Names This article incorporates public domain material from websites or documents of the United States Board on Geographic Names.
- Davis Valley, USGS: United States Geological Survey
- This article incorporates public domain material from websites or documents of the United States Geological Survey.
