= Coal Rock =

Coal Rock (83°29′S 50°38′W) is a prominent nunatak lying 4 nautical miles (7 km) southeast of Fierle Peak at the south end of the Forrestal Range, Pensacola Mountains. It was mapped by the United States Geological Survey (USGS) from surveys and from U.S. Navy air photos, 1956–1966, and named by Dwight L. Schmidt, USGS geologist for two beds of graphitic coal that are well exposed on the nunatak.

== Geology ==
Coal Rock exposes about 200 meters (660 ft) of the Permian Pecora Formation. At Coal Rock, it consists of gray to tan weathering, thin-bedded, fine-grained, quartzose and feldspathic sandstone that contains many thin interbeds of carbonaceous and pyritic siltstone and shale. The sandstone is commonly cross-bedded and forms ledges. Two beds of graphitic coal, each about 1 meter (3.3 ft) thick, are exposed at Coal Rock. These coal beds contain plant fossils including a glossopterid paleoflora of Permian age.
