= Jaeger Table =

Ice-covered summit plateau of Dufek Massif in Antarctica

- Location within Antarctica

Highest point
- Coordinates: 82°36′S 52°30′W

Geography
- Location: Pensacola Mountains, Antarctica
- Parent range: Dufek Massif

The Jaeger Table (82°36′S 52°30′W) is the ice-covered summit plateau of Dufek Massif, in the Pensacola Mountains of Antarctica, rising to 2,030 metres (6,660 ft) at Worcester Summit.

== Mapping and name ==
The plateau was mapped by the United States Geological Survey (USGS) in 1968 from ground surveys and United States Navy aerial photographs taken 1964. It was named by the United States Advisory Committee on Antarctic Names (US-ACAN), at the suggestion of USGS geologist Arthur B. Ford, after Commander James W. Jaeger, United States Navy, pilot of the Squadron VXE-6 Lockheed C-130 Hercules aircraft that landed the USGS field party in the area in the 1976–77 season.

== Location ==
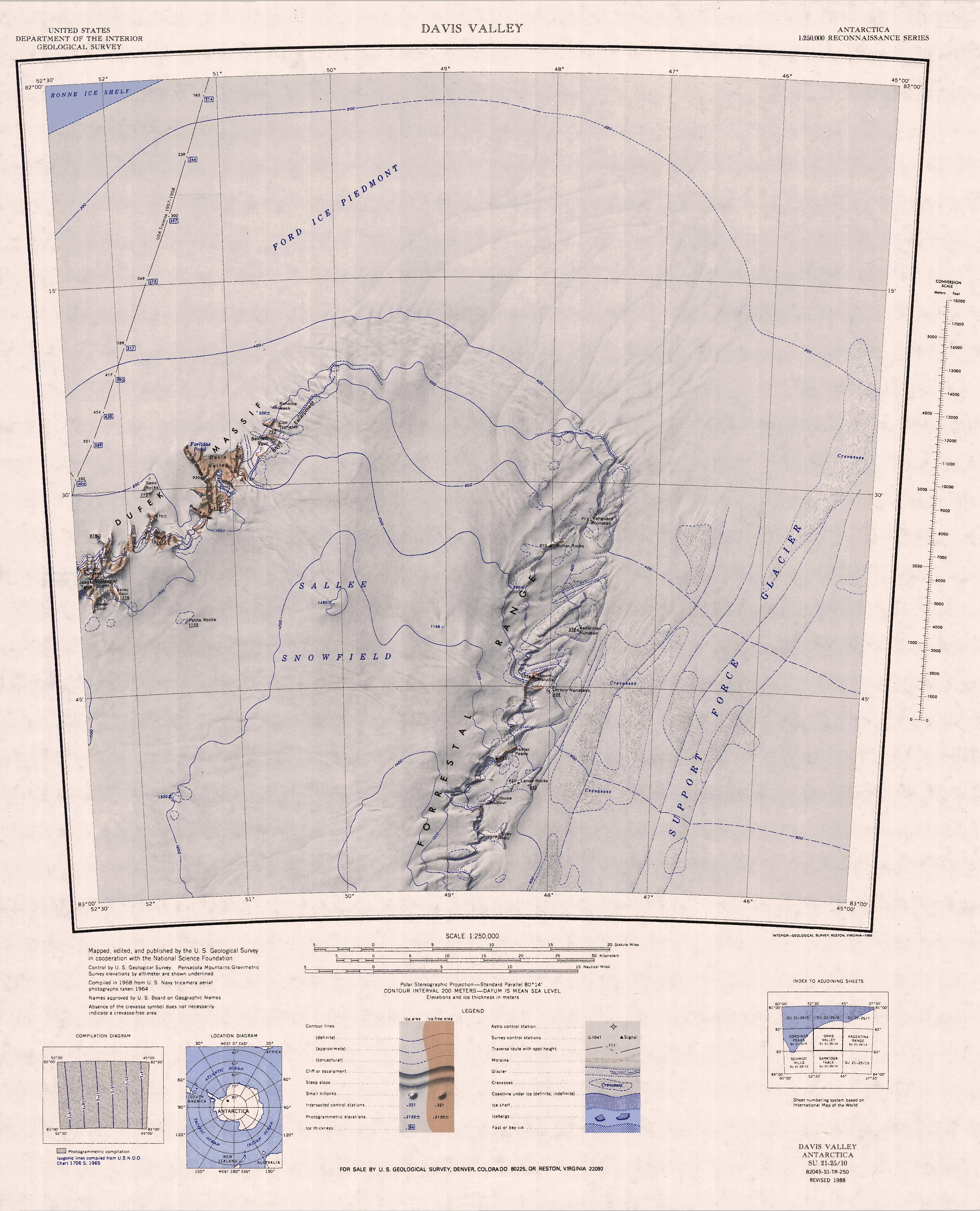

The Jaeger Table is east of Neuburg Peak in the Dufek Massif and west of Davis Valley. The Ford Ice Piedmont is to the north and the Sallee Snowfield is to the south. Features immediately surrounding the plateau include Spear Spur, Kelley Spur, Worcester Summit, Lewis Spur and Carlson Buttress. Features along the escarpment that extends east from the plateau include Frost Spur, Alley Spur, Sapp Rocks and Nutt Bluff.

== Features ==
=== Spear Spur ===
82°38′S 52°22′W. A rock spur 3 nautical miles (5.6 km; 3.5 mi) east of Clinton Spur on the south side of Dufek Massif. Mapped by USGS from surveys and United States Navy air photos, 1956–66. Named by US-ACAN for Albert Spear, builder, Ellsworth Station winter party, 1957.

=== Kelley Spur ===
82°37′S 52°08′W. A rock spur 2 nautical miles (3.7 km; 2.3 mi) east of Spear Spur on the south side of Dufek Massif. Mapped by USGS from surveys and United States Navy air photos, 1956–66. Named by US-ACAN for Samuel Kelley, photographer of United States Navy Squadron VX-6 on several Deep Freeze deployments, 1964–70.

=== Worcester Summit ===
82°36′S 52°22′W. The crest of a ridge rising to about 2,030 metres (6,660 ft) high at the east end of Jaeger Table. Named by US-ACAN in 1979 after Robin Worcester who, with David W. Bennett, comprised the first of the annual USGS satellite surveying teams at the South Pole Station, winter party 1973.

=== Lewis Spur ===
82°34′S 52°13′W. A rock spur 1.5 nautical miles (2.8 km; 1.7 mi) west of Frost Spur on the north side of Dufek Massif. Mapped by USGS from surveys and United States Navy air photos, 1956–66. Named by US-ACAN for Atles F. Lewis, aviation structural mechanic, Ells worth Station winter party, 1957.

=== Carlson Buttress ===
82°35′S 52°27′W. A rock buttress to the northwest of Worcester Summit, rising to about 1,800 metres (5,900 ft) high on the north side of Jaeger Table. Named by US-ACAN in 1979 for Christine Carlson, USGS geologist who worked in the Dufek Massif area, summer 1976–77.

=== The Organ Pipes ===
82°37′S 52°42′W. Notable rock cliffs on the northwest side of Jaeger Table, south of Cairn Ridge. The name is suggested by the appearance of the feature caused by weathering along prominent vertical joints in the gabbro rock. Named by Arthur B. Ford, USGS geologist, leader of the USGS Pensacola Mountains survey party, 1978–79.

=== Czamanske Ridge ===
82°35′S 52°42′W. A ridge between Jaeger Table and Welcome Pass. Named by US-ACAN after Gerald K. Czamanske, USGS geologist, a member of the USGS Pensacola Mountains party, 1976–77.

== Eastern features ==
=== Frost Spur ===
82°33′S 51°59′W. A rock spur between Lewis Spur and Alley Spur or the north side of Dufek Massif Pensacola Mountains. Mapped by USGS from surveys and United States Navy air photos, 1956–66. Named by US-ACAN for Charles Frost, logistics specialist, Office of Antarctic Programs, National Science Foundation.

=== Alley Spur ===
82°32′S 51°47′W. A rock spur on north side of Dufek Massif, just south of Sapp Rocks. Mapped by USGS from surveys and United States Navy air photos, 1956–66. Named by US-ACAN for Captain Dalton E. Alley, United States Air Force, navigator, a member of the Electronic Test Unit in the Pensacola Mountains, 1957–58.

=== Sapp Rocks ===
82°30′S 51°48′W. Two exposed rocks lying 2 nautical miles (3.7 km; 2.3 mi) north of Alley Spur along the north side of Dufek Massif. Mapped by USGS from surveys and United States Navy air photos, 1956–66. Named by US-ACAN for Cliflton E. Sapp, hospital corpsman with the South Pole winter party, 1965.

=== Nutt Bluff ===
82°34′S 51°45′W. Rock bluff rising to about 1,315 metres (4,314 ft) high southeast of Alley Spur. Named by US-ACAN at the suggestion of Arthur B. Ford, leader of the USGS geological party in the Dufek Massif, 1976–77, after Constance J. Nutt, geologist, Stanford University, Stanford, CA, a member of the USGS party.

== Sources ==
- Alberts, Fred G., ed. (1995), Geographic Names of the Antarctic (PDF) (2 ed.), United States Board on Geographic Names This article incorporates public domain material from websites or documents of the United States Board on Geographic Names.
- Davis Valley, USGS: United States Geological Survey
- This article incorporates public domain material from websites or documents of the United States Geological Survey.
