= Boyd Escarpment =

Escarpment in the Dufek Massif, Pensacola Mountains, Antarctica

- Location within Antarctica

Highest point
- Coordinates: 82°26′S 50°30′W

Geography
- Location: Pensacola Mountains, Antarctica
- Parent range: Dufek Massif

The Boyd Escarpment (82°26′S 50°30′W) is a rock and snow escarpment which extends northeast for 10 nautical miles (19 km; 12 mi) from Wujek Ridge, in the Dufek Massif, Pensacola Mountains, Antarctica. It includes Bennett Spur, Cox Nunatak and Rankine Rock.

== Name ==
The Boyd Escarpment was named in 1979 by the United States Advisory Committee on Antarctic Names (US-ACAN) after Walter W. Boyd, Jr., a U.S. International Geophysical Year glaciologist who wintered at Little America, 1957; geologist, United States Geological Survey (USGS), for three summers in the Pensacola Mountains, 1962–66.

== Location ==
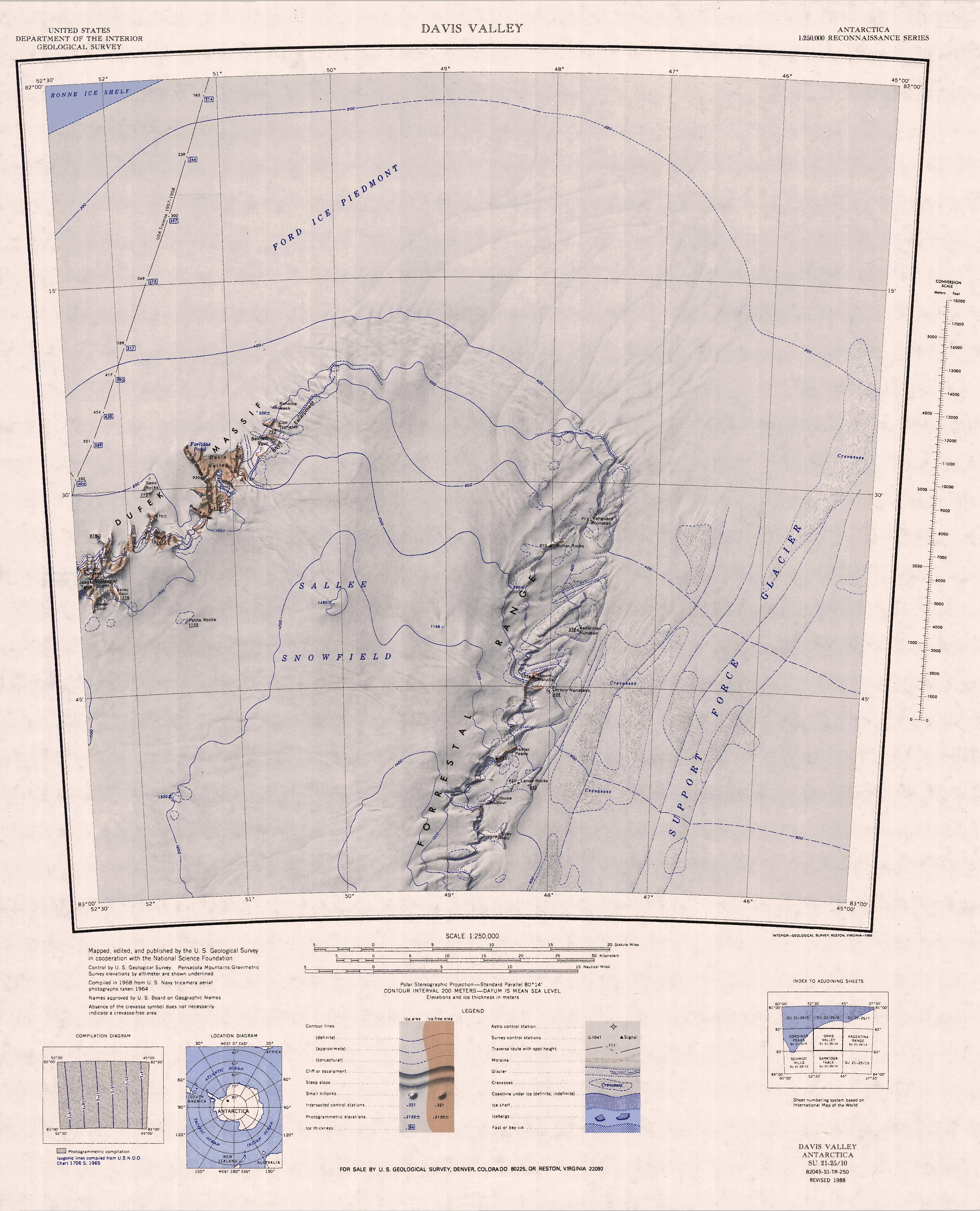

The Boyd Escarpment is the northern part of the Dufek Massif, facing the Ford Ice Piedmont to the north, with the Sallee Snowfield to its south. It is east of Davis Valley. Features include, from west to east, Bennett Spur, Cox Nunatak and Rankine Rock.

== Features ==
=== Bennett Spur ===
82°26′S 50°38′W. A rock spur between Wujek Ridge and Cox Nunatak. Named by US-ACAN in 1979 after David W. Bennett who, with Robin Worcester, comprised the first of the annual USGS satellite surveying teams at the South Pole Station, winter party 1973.

=== Cox Nunatak ===
82°26′S 50°34′W. A nunatak, 795 metres (2,608 ft) high, standing 1 nautical mile (1.9 km; 1.2 mi) south of Rankine Rock. Mapped by USGS from surveys and United States Navy air photos, 1956-66. Named by US-ACAN for Walter M. Cox, photographer, Ellsworth Station winter party, 1957.

=== Rankine Rock ===
82°24′S 50°35′W. A rock lying 1 nautical mile (1.9 km; 1.2 mi) north of Cox Nunatak at the north extremity of Dufek Massif. Mapped by USGS from surveys and United States Navy air photos, 1956-66. Named by US-ACAN for David F. Rankine, Jr., photographer with United States Navy Squadron VX-6 during Operation Deep Freeze 1964.

== Sources ==
- Alberts, Fred G., ed. (1995), Geographic Names of the Antarctic (PDF) (2 ed.), United States Board on Geographic Names This article incorporates public domain material from websites or documents of the United States Board on Geographic Names.
- Davis Valley, USGS: United States Geological Survey
- This article incorporates public domain material from websites or documents of the United States Geological Survey.
