= Kester Peaks =

Mountain in Antarctica

- Location within Antarctica

Highest point
- Coordinates: 82°49′S 48°23′W

Geography
- Location: (Antarctica) Pensacola Mountains
- Parent range: Forrestal Range

The Kester Peaks (82°49′S 48°23′W) are three aligned rock peaks standing together 5 nautical miles (9.3 km; 5.8 mi) south of Mount Malville on the east side of the Forrestal Range, in the Pensacola Mountains, Antarctica.

== Mapping and name ==
The Kester Peaks were mapped by the United States Geological Survey (USGS) from surveys and United States Navy air photos from 1956 to 1966, They were named by the United States Advisory Committee on Antarctic Names (US-ACAN) for Larry T. Kester, a photographer with United States Navy Squadron VX-6 during Operation Deep Freeze in 1964.

== Location ==
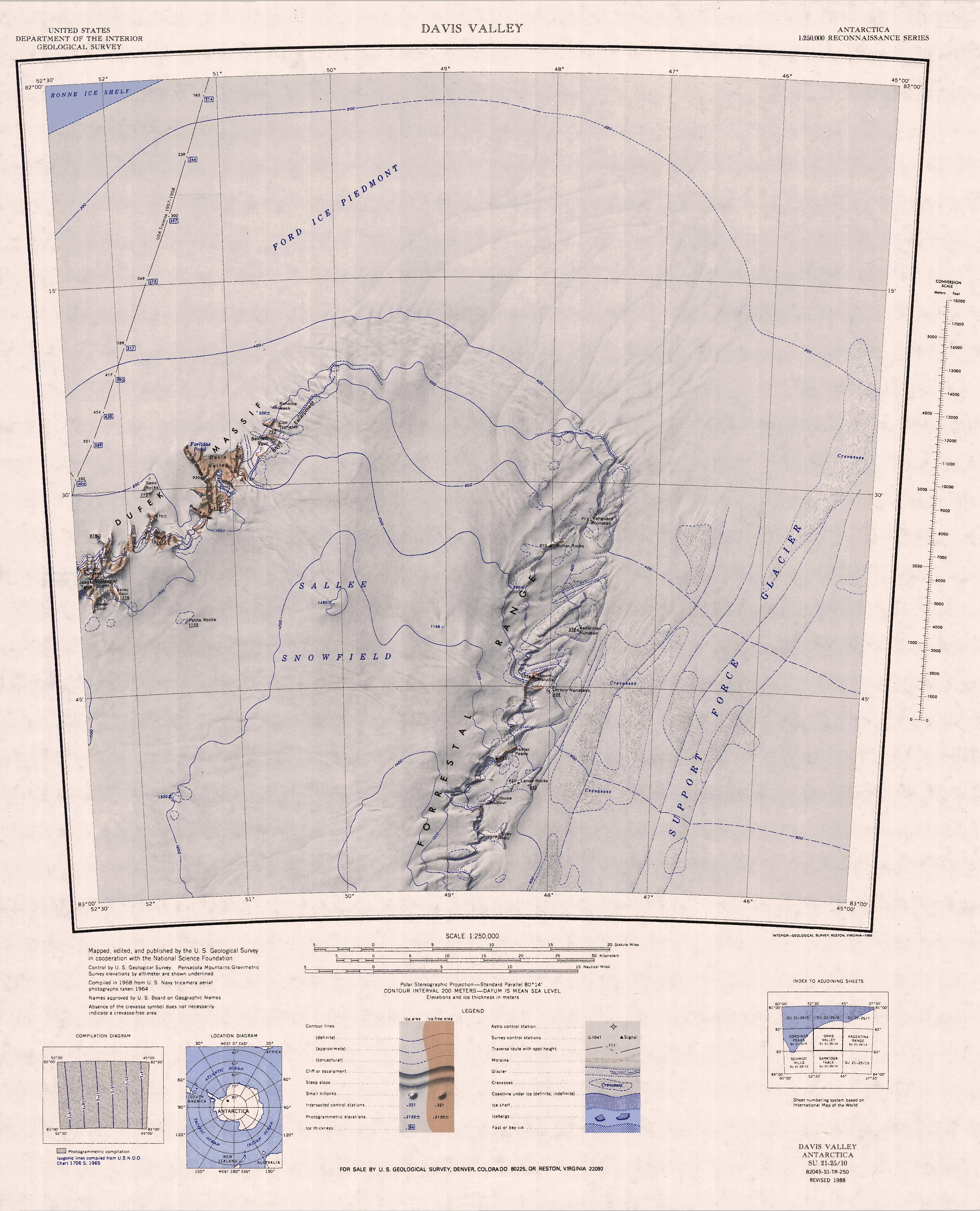
Forrestal Range in center, south of map. Kester Peaks in center of this part of the range

The Kester Peaks are towards the north of the Forrestal Range, which trends north-northeast between the Sallee Snowfield to the west and the Support Force Glacier to the east. They are south of Mount Malville and north of the Lexington Table. Nearby features to the south include the Lance Rocks, Crouse Spur and Gray Hill.

== Nearby features ==
=== Lance Rocks ===
82°52′S 48°19′W. Two rocks lying together at the northeast end of Grouse Spur. Mapped by USGS from surveys and United States Navy air photos, 1956–66. Named by US-ACAN for Captain Samuel J. Lance, United States Air Force, navigator and member of the Electronic Test Unit in the Pensacola Mountains, 1957–58.

=== Crouse Spur ===
82°53′S 48°35′W. A partly snow and rock spur descending from the east side of Forrestal Range, 3 nautical miles (5.6 km; 3.5 mi) south of Kester Peaks. Mapped by USGS from surveys and United States Navy air photos, 1956–66. Named by US-ACAN for Carl L. Crouse, construction man with the Ellsworth Station winter party, 1957.

=== Gray Hill ===
82°56′S 48°29′W. A mainly ice-covered hill, 1,020 metres (3,350 ft) high, standing 2.5 nautical miles (4.6 km; 2.9 mi) south of Crouse Spur on the east side of Forrestal Range. Mapped by USGS from surveys and United States Navy air photos, 1956–66. Named by US-ACAN for Master Sergeant Kitt Gray, United States Air Force, flight engineer and member of the Electronic Test Unit in the Pensacola Mountains, 1957–58.

== Sources ==
- Alberts, Fred G., ed. (1995), Geographic Names of the Antarctic (PDF) (2 ed.), United States Board on Geographic Names This article incorporates public domain material from websites or documents of the United States Board on Geographic Names.
- Davis Valley, USGS: United States Geological Survey
- This article incorporates public domain material from websites or documents of the United States Geological Survey.
