= Nolan B. Aughenbaugh =

- Nolan B. Aughenbaugh in 2001
- Born: July 29, 1928; Akron, Ohio, U.S.
- Died: April 5, 2017 (aged 88)
- Education: PhD Purdue University
- Engineering career
- Institutions: University of Mississippi; University of Missouri-Rolla; University of Alaska Fairbanks

Nolan Blaine Aughenbaugh (July 29, 1928 – April 5, 2017) was an American Professor Emeritus of Geological Engineering at the University of Mississippi.

== Biography ==
Aughenbaugh was born in Akron, Ohio, and was an Antarctic explorer during the International Geophysical Year. He also holds a Ph.D. in Civil Engineering from Purdue University.

Aughenbaugh was married and had three children. He died on April 5, 2017, at the age of 88.

== Awards and honors ==
- Aughenbaugh Peak was named for Nolan B. Aughenbaugh by the Advisory Committee on Antarctic Names (US-ACAN)
- The Aughenbaugh Gabbro, part of the Dufek Intrusion, Antarctica was named for Nolan B. Aughenbaugh

== Published works ==
- Preliminary report on the geology of the Dufek Massif: IG Y World Data Center A glaciology, Gla. Rept, 1961
- Characterization Of Swelling Potential Of Shale Strata
