= Lance Rock =

Lance Rock may refer to:

- Lance Archer, wrestler active under the ring name Lance Rock
- Lance Robertson, host of the kids' series Yo Gabba Gabba! as DJ Lance Rock
- Lance Rocke, a character in the film Beyond the Valley of the Dolls
- Lance Rock (record label), for artists such as Man or Astro-man?
- Lance Rocks, geographical feature near Kester Peaks
