= Gray Hill =

Gray Hill may refer to:

- Gray Hill, Monmouthshire, in Wales
- Gray Hill (Antarctica), in the Forrestal Mountains, Antarctica
