= Charles F. Zirzow =

United States civil engineer

CDR Charles F. Zirzow

Commander Charles F. Zirzow, U.S. Navy, (December 19, 1922 – July 3, 1997) was assistant chief of staff for civil engineering with the Naval Civil Engineering Corps and was Assistant Chief of Staff to the Commander, U.S. Naval Support Force, Antarctica, 1966-67.

== Career ==
Zirzow served as a paratrooper with the army during World War II and received the Purple Heart. After the war, he attended the University of Illinois, where he was a member of Phi Beta Kappa and graduated summa cum laude in civil engineering.

He lived in Fairfax, Virginia and worked with the Naval Civil Engineering Corps from 1950 to 1967. During his years there, he served as a public works officer and then as director of the natural resources management staff. He was named assistant chief of staff for civil engineering and spent his final years with naval forces in Antarctica. Mount Zirzow of the Forrestal Range in Antarctica is named in his honor.

In 1967 he retired with the rank of commander and then joined the Washington engineering firm of Howard Needles Tammen & Bergendoff, first working as an aviation facilities engineer and then as director of environmental quality. He retired from the firm in 1983 and started his consulting business, which he continued until his death in 1997.

He was a founding director of the National Association of Environmental Professionals (NAEP) and was a past secretary, treasurer and president. The Zirzow Student Award was established in 2001, and is presented to a deserving college student or recent graduate, who has been recognized by their department for their academic achievement.
