= Dufek Intrusion =

The Dufek Intrusion is a mafic layered intrusion that was emplaced into present-day Antarctica approximately 183 million years ago. It comprises two outcropping sections called the Dufek Massif and the Forrestal Range that are thought to be connected beneath the Sallee Snowfield.

The Dufek intrusion is associated with large volumes of Jurassic tholeiitic magmatism associated with the breakup of Gondwana. This magmatism stretched from northern Victoria Land to Dronning Maud Land and onwards into Africa and Australia. Stratigraphy within the intrusion includes the 1.8 km thick Dufek Massif section and associated nanataks. This massif section is composed of the 230 m thick Walker Anorthosite, with laminated plagioclase cumulates, overlain by the Aughenbaugh Gabbro. This gabbro consists of laminated plagioclase with and the augite-pigeonite pyroxene cumulus. The upper portion of the intrusion consists of the 1.7 km thick Forrestal Range section, with the Saratoga Gabbro cumulates overlain by the 300 m thick Lexington Granophyre.
