= Davis Valley =

Dry valley in Antarctica

- Location within Antarctica

Highest point
- Coordinates: 82°28′S 51°9′W

Geography
- Location: Pensacola Mountains, Antarctica
- Parent range: Dufek Massif

Davis Valley (82°28′S 51°9′W) is an ice-free valley just east of Floridas Ridge in north-east Dufek Massif, in the Pensacola Mountains, Antarctica.

== Mapping and name ==
Davis Valley was mapped by the United States Geological Survey (USGS) from surveys and United States Navy air photos in 1956–66. It was named by the United States Advisory Committee on Antarctic Names (US-ACAN) for Edward H. Davis, a construction mechanic with the Ellsworth Station winter party in 1957.

== Location ==
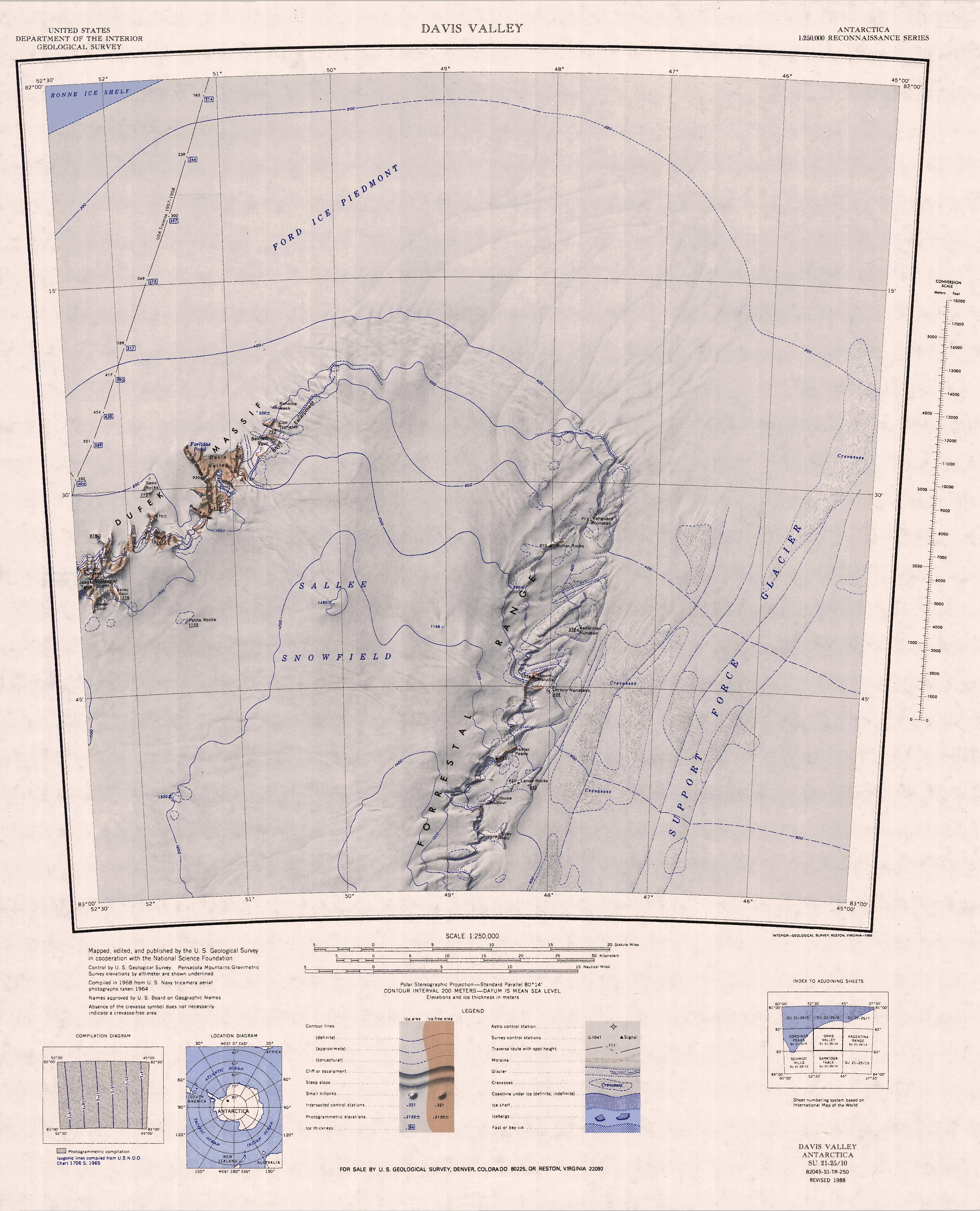
David Valley towards east of center

David Valley is towards the northeast of the Dufek Massif, between Jaeger Table to the southwest and Boyd Escarpment to the northeast. The Ford Ice Piedmont is to the north and the Sallee Snowfield is to the south. Features include Preslik Spur, Clemons Spur, Edge Glacier, Forlidas Ridge, Forlidas Pond and Wujeck Ridge.

== Antarctic Specially Protected Area ==
Davis Valley and other, adjacent ice-free valleys, forms one of the most southerly ‘dry valley’ systems on the continent and has exceptional scientific value for the interpretation of past glacial events and climate in this part of Antarctica. With #Forlidas Pond some 500 metres (1,600 ft) away, the site is protected under the Antarctic Treaty System as Antarctic Specially Protected Area (ASPA) No.119.

== Features ==
=== Preslik Spur ===
82°32′S 51°20′W. An ice-free spur lying south of Clemons Spur and Forlidas Ridge. Named by US-ACAN, at the suggestion of USGS party leader Arthur B. Ford, after Private First Class Joseph W. Preslik, a member of the United States Army Aviation Detachment with the USGS Pensacola Mountains survey, 1965-66.

=== Kistler Valley ===
82.5°S 51.5°W. A mostly ice-filled valley in the east-central part of the Dufek Massif. The valley lies between Sapp Rocks and Forlidas Ridge and heads in the amphitheater between Nutt Bluff and Preslik Spur. Named after Ronald W. Kistler, Research Geologist, USGS, (retired). His laboratory research and scientific reporting with A.B. Ford (1979-2000) on the geochronology and petrology of the Dufek Intrusion of the northern Pensacola Mountains was critical for the understanding of the evolution of this major igneous complex.

=== Clemons Spur ===
82°31′S 51°13′W. A bare rock spur next south of Forlidas Ridge. Named at the suggestion of party leader Arthur B. Ford, USGS, after Samuel D. Clemons, steward, United States Navy Squadron VXE-6, with the USGS Pensacola Mountains survey, 1965-66.

=== Forlidas Ridge ===
82°29′S 51°16′W. A rock ridge that forms the west side of Davis Valley. Mapped by USGS from surveys and United States Navy air photos, 1956-66. Named by US-ACAN after Charles W. Forlidas, radioman, Ellsworth Station winter party, 1957.

=== Forlidas Pond ===
82°27′S 51°21′W. A round frozen pond, 100 metres (330 ft) in diameter, lying in a morainal valley east of the north end of Forlidas Ridge. The only pond in the northern Pensacola Mountains, it is of much interest to biologists. The pond was discovered and briefly investigated in December 1957 by a US-IGY party from Ellsworth Station. The name is in association with Forlidas Ridge and was suggested by Arthur B. Ford of USGS following geological work in the area, 1978-79.

=== Wujek Ridge ===
82°28′S 50°55′W. A rock ridge trending north–south and marking the east extent of Davis Valley. Named by US-ACAN in 1979 after CWO Stanley J. Wujek, United States Army, helicopter pilot of the Army Aviation Detachment which supported the USGS Pensacola Mountains survey, 1965-66.

== Sources ==
- Alberts, Fred G., ed. (1995), Geographic Names of the Antarctic (PDF) (2 ed.), United States Board on Geographic Names This article incorporates public domain material from websites or documents of the United States Board on Geographic Names.
- Davis Valley, USGS: United States Geological Survey
- "Davis Valley and Forlidas Pond, Dufek Massif" (PDF), Management Plan for Antarctic Specially Protected Area No. 119: Measure 2, Annex D, Antarctic Treaty Secretariat, 2005
- "Kistler Valley", Geographic Names Information System, United States Geological Survey, United States Department of the Interior
- This article incorporates public domain material from websites or documents of the United States Geological Survey.
