= Argentina Range =

Mountain range in Antarctica

- Location within Antarctica

Geography
- Range coordinates: 82°20′S 042°00′W
- Parent range: Pensacola Mountains

The Argentina Range (82°20′S 42°00′W) is a range of rock peaks and bluffs, 42 nautical miles (78 km; 48 mi) long, lying 35 nautical miles (65 km; 40 mi) east of the northern part of Forrestal Range in the northeastern portion of the Pensacola Mountains of Antarctica.

== Discovery and name ==
The Argentina Range was discovered and photographed on January 13, 1956, in the course of a United States Navy transcontinental nonstop plane flight from McMurdo Sound to Weddell Sea and return. It was named by the United States Advisory Committee on Antarctic Names (US-ACAN) after Argentina, which for many years from 1955 maintained a scientific station on the Filchner Ice Shelf at the General Belgrano or Ellsworth Station site. The entire Pensacola Mountains were mapped by United States Geological Survey (1863) in 1967 and 1968 from ground surveys and from United States Navy tricameral photographs taken in 1964.

== Location ==
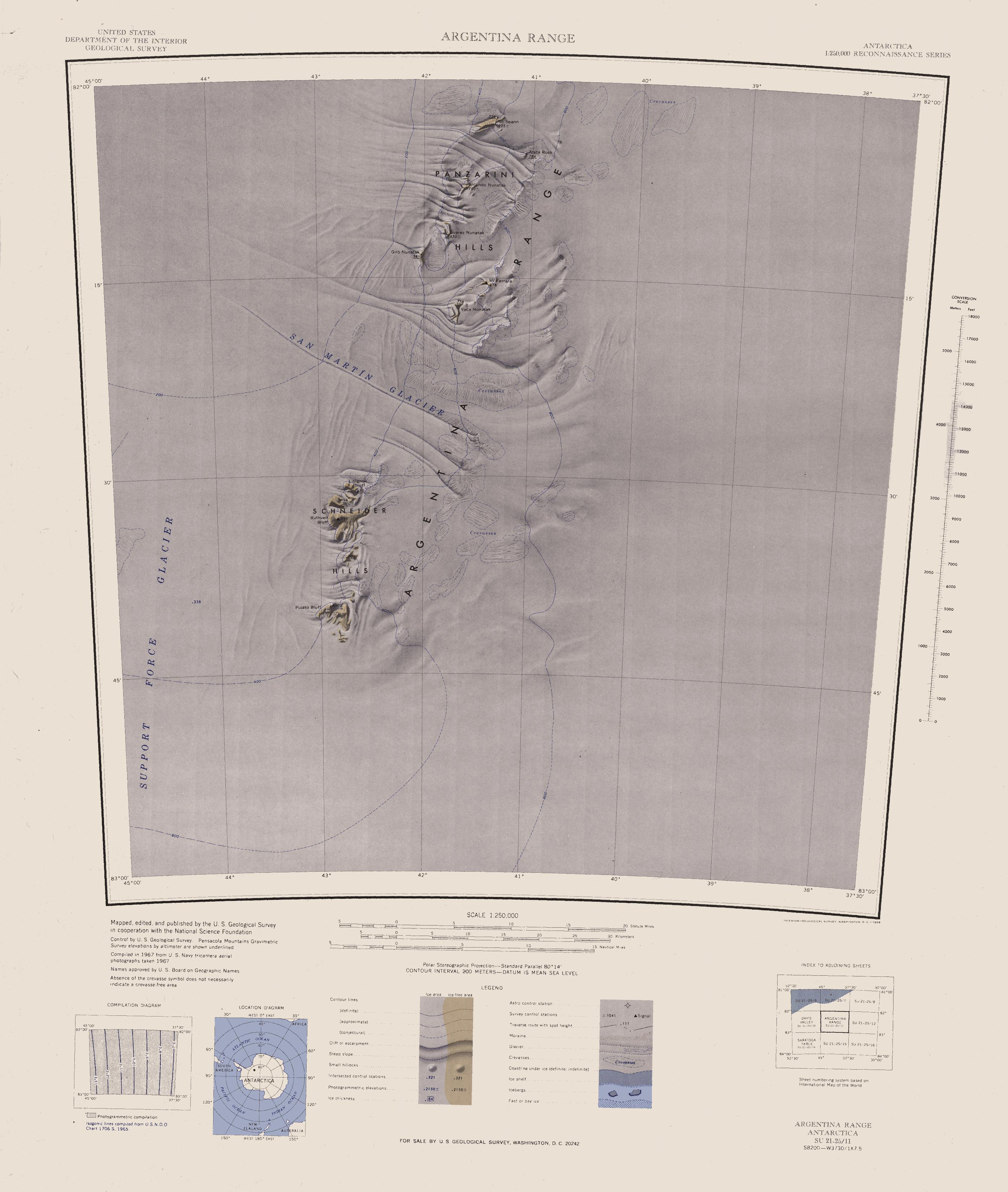
Argentina Range in center of map

The Argentina Range lies between the Support Force Glacier to the west, which separates it from the Forrestal Range, and the East Antarctic Ice Sheet to the east. The Blackwall Ice Stream joins the Recovery Glacier between the Argentina Range and Whichaway Nunataks. The range is bisected by the San Martín Glacier, which flows west between the Schneider Hills to the south and the Panzarini Hills to the north. Features of the Schneider Hills include, from south to north, Pujato Bluff, Ruthven Bluff, Sosa Bluff and Lisignoli Bluff. Features of the Panzarini Hills include, from south to north, Vaca Nunatak, Mount Ferrara, Giro Nunatak, Suarez Nunatak, Arcondo Nunatak, Areta Rock and Mount Spann.

== Schneider Hills ==
82°36′S 42°45′W. A group of hills lying south of San Martin Glacier and forming the south half of the Argentina Range. Named by US-ACAN for Otto Schneider, chief scientist of the Institute Antartico Argentine in this period.

=== Pujato Bluff ===
82°40′S 42°57′W. A rock bluff, 660 metres (2,170 ft) high, forming the south end of Schneider Hills. Named by US-ACAN for Gen. Hernán Pujato, officer in charge of Argentine wintering parties at General Belgrano Station in 1955 and 1956.

=== Ruthven Bluff ===
82°34′S 42°54′W. Large rock bluff 1 nautical mile (1.9 km; 1.2 mi) south of Sosa Bluff. Named by US-ACAN for Richard W. Ruthven, USGS surveyor who visited the bluff in the 1965–66 season.

=== Sosa Bluff ===
82°32′S 42°53′W. A rock bluff 1 nautical mile (1.9 km; 1.2 mi) south of Lisignoli Bluff. Named by US-ACAN for Lieutenant O.R. Sosa, Argentine officer in charge of General Belgrano Station, winter 1966.

=== Lisignoli Bluff ===
82°31′S 42°41′W. A rock bluff, 610 metres (2,000 ft) high, forming the north end of Schneider Hills. Named by US-ACAN for Cesar Augusto Lisignoli, Argentine glaciologist and scientific leader at Ellsworth Station, winter 1961.

== Panzarini Hills ==
82°10′S 41°30′W. A group of hills lying north of San Martin Glacier and forming the north half of the Argentina Range. Named by US-ACAN for Admiral Rodolfo N. Panzarini, Director of the Instituto Antártico Argentine in this period.

=== Vaca Nunatak ===
82°17′S 41°42′W. The southernmost nunatak of Panzarini Hills. Named by US-ACAN for Captain José M.T. Vaca, Argentine officer in charge of General Belgrano Station, winter 1961.

=== Mount Ferrara ===
82°15′S 41°25′W. A mountain, 875 metres (2,871 ft) high, standing 2.5 nautical miles (4.6 km; 2.9 mi) northeast of Vaca Nunatak. Named by US-ACAN for Chief Aviation Machinists Mate Frederick J. Ferrara, United States Navy, crew chief of the P2V-2N Neptune aircraft making the flight.

=== Giró Nunatak ===
82°13′S 42°02′W. A nunatak 4 nautical miles (7.4 km; 4.6 mi) northwest of Vaca Nunatak. Named by US-ACAN for Captain G.A. Gir6, Argentine officer in charge of General Belgrano Station, winter 1965.

=== Suarez Nunatak ===
82°12′S 41°47′W. A nunatak, 830 metres (2,720 ft) high, standing 5 nautical miles (9.3 km; 5.8 mi) northwest of Mount Ferrara. Named by US-ACAN for Captain Jorge Suarez, Argentine officer in charge at Ellsworth Station, 1959-61.

=== Arcondo Nunatak ===
82°08′S 41°37′W. A nunatak, 780 metres (2,560 ft) high, standing 5 nautical miles (9.3 km; 5.8 mi) south of Mount Spann. Named by US-ACAN for Mayor Pedro Arcondo, Argentine officer in charge at General Belgrano Station, 1959-61.

=== Areta Rock ===
82°06′S 41°05′W. A rock 3 nautical miles (5.6 km; 3.5 mi) southeast of Mount Spann. Named by US-ACAN for Lieutenant Eduardo Ferrin Areta, Argentine officer in charge at Ellsworth Station, winter 1961.

=== Mount Spann ===
82°03′S 41°21′W. A mountain, 925 metres (3,035 ft) high, marking the north extremity of the Panzarini Hills. Named by US-ACAN for Staff Sergeant Robert C. Spann, USMC, navigator of the P2V-2N Neptune aircraft during this flight.

== Sources ==
- Alberts, Fred G., ed. (1995), Geographic Names of the Antarctic (PDF) (2 ed.), United States Board on Geographic Names This article incorporates public domain material from websites or documents of the United States Board on Geographic Names.
- Argentina Range, USGS: United States Geological Survey
- "Blackwall Ice Stream", Geographic Names Information System, United States Geological Survey, United States Department of the Interior
- This article incorporates public domain material from websites or documents of the United States Geological Survey.
