= Ralph W. Sallee =

American meteorologist and naval officer (1927–2022)

Ralph William Sallee (November 26, 1927 - February 9, 2022) was an American meteorologist and commander in the U.S. Navy.

== Biography ==
Sallee was born in Arkansas on November 26, 1927.

During the Korean War he served aboard the aircraft carrier USS Oriskany. Later he served in Hawaii, Guam, Port Hueneme, California and at the U.S. Naval Station Sangley Point near Manila in the Philippines (1964–1966).

On September 11, 1967, Lieutenant Commander Sallee relieved Lt. A. W. Snell as Officer-in-charge, Det. Charlie, Antarctic Support Activities. In recognition of his meteorological contributions during his service with Operation Deep Freeze, a mapped area of the Antarctica was named Sallee Snowfield by the Advisory Committee on Antarctic Names (US-ACAN).

He retired from the U.S. Navy in 1975. He died on February 9, 2022.
