= Nolan =

Nolan may refer to:

== People ==
- Nolan (given name)
- Nolan (surname)
- Michael Nolan, Baron Nolan (1928–2007), British judge
- The Nolans, an Irish all-female band
- Christopher Nolan, British and American filmmaker
- Jonathan Nolan, British and American filmmaker

== Places in the United States ==
- Nolan, Texas
- Nolan County, Texas
- Nolan River, Texas
- Nolan, West Virginia

== See also ==
- Nolan amphora
- Nolan Chart, a political diagram popularized by Libertarian David Nolan
- Nolan Helmets, an Italian helmet manufacturer
- Nolan principles, first report of the Committee on Standards in Public Life
