= Nolan Gottlieb =

American basketball player

Nolan Gottlieb (born 1982) is a former NCAA Division II basketballer and currently head men’s basketball coach at Trinity Christian School in Dublin, Georgia. He has the genetic condition cystic fibrosis.

== Playing career ==
A member of Anderson's junior varsity teams, Gottlieb was promoted to the varsity team in 2004-05 due to his strong work ethic and professional attitude. In a January 2005 interview Gottlieb spoke of the determination which was the basis of his ongoing success despite the adversity presented by cystic fibrosis. "I've got no choice, I can get up off my rear and go out and work or be at home in bed dying at age 45. It's either live or die. With the goals, I've set for myself, there's no way I can just sit around. I've got to do what I've got to do", he said, hoping his experience would encourage and inspire others with the same condition, "I wish there was a way to get my story out to other CF patients, I tell the younger kids with CF to stay as active as possible. That's been the biggest thing for me."

== Coaching career ==
Following the completion of his playing career and graduation with a degree in Kinesiology in 2005–06, Gottlieb joined the men's basketball coaching staff at Anderson University. Head Coach Jason Taylor endorsed the decision stating, "I'm pleased that he wanted to stay here at Anderson and be a part of our staff. He is a good young coach with a bright future in this business.". Nolan later went on to coach the NewSpring 17U boys in the Anderson church league, where the team finished with a record of 4–6 on the year.

On May 6th 2024, it was announced that Nolan will become the next head men’s basketball coach at his alma mater, Trinity Christian School in Dublin, GA

== Family ==
His father Stuart Gottlieb played four years as an offensive tackle with the Dallas Cowboys in the NFL.
