= Neuburg Peak =

Jagged rock peak in Antarctica

- Location within Antarctica

Highest point
- Elevation: 1,840 m (6,040 ft)
- Coordinates: 82°37′S 52°54′W

Geography
- Location: Pensacola Mountains, Antarctica

Neuburg Peak (82°37′S 52°54′W) is a jagged rock peak in Antarctica, 1,840 metres (6,040 ft) high, rising 2.5 nautical miles (4.6 km; 2.9 mi) east of Walker Peak in the southwest part of Dufek Massif, Pensacola Mountains.

== Mapping and name ==
Neuburg Peak was mapped by the United States Geological Survey (USGS) from surveys and United States Navy air photographs from 1956 to 1966. It was named by the United States Advisory Committee on Antarctic Names (US-ACAN) for Hugo A.C. Neuburg, a glaciologist at Ellsworth Station and a member of the first party to visit Dufek Massif in December 1957.

== Location ==
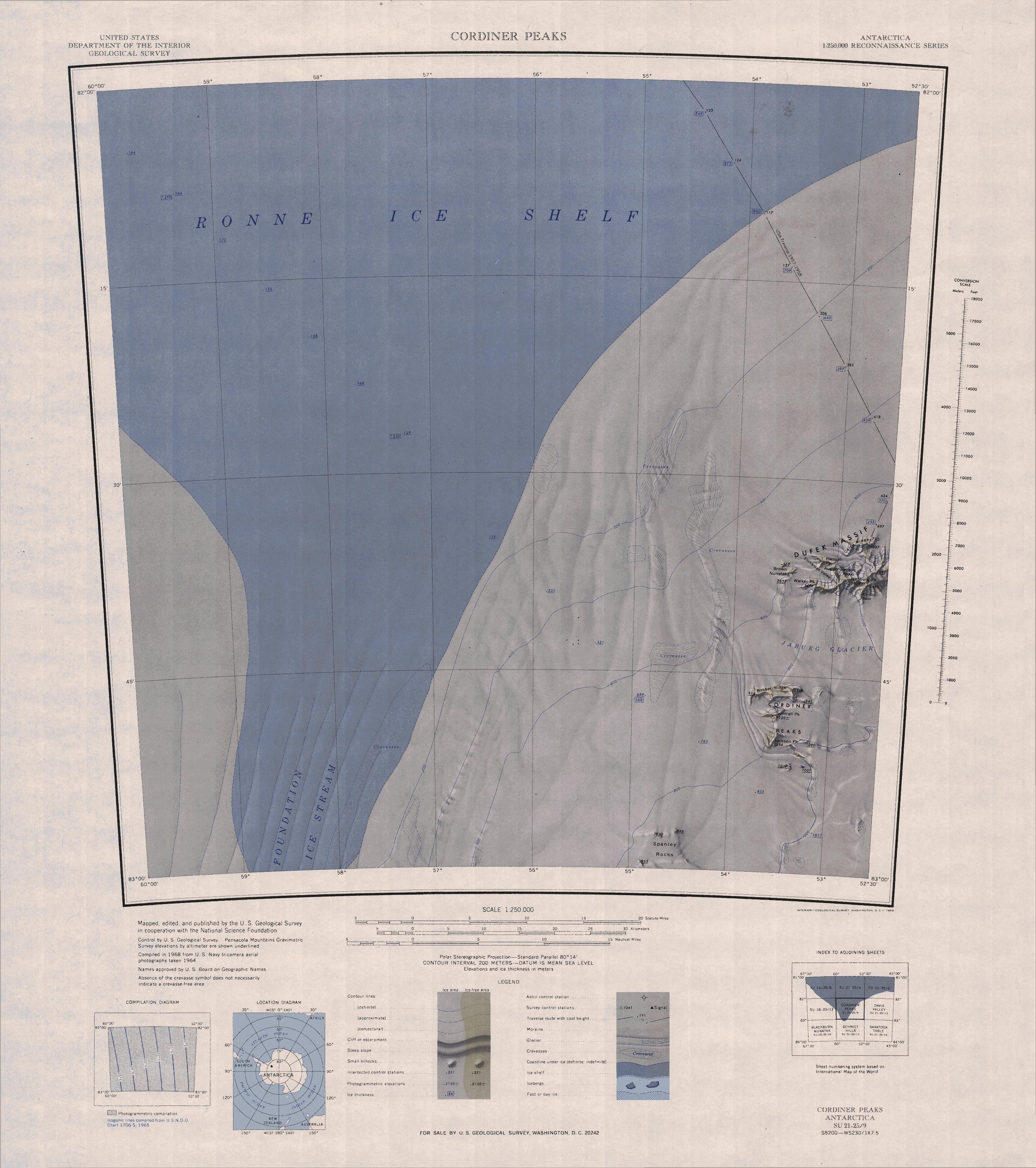
Neuburg Peak near east margin of center of map

Neuburg Peak is in the southwest end of the Dufek Massif, looking over the Jaburg Glacier to the south. It is west of the Worcester Summit. The Clinton Spur is south of the mountain, Aughenbaugh Peak is to the east (Note: The USGS map of the region shows Aughenbaugh Peak to the west of Neuburg Peak. However, the coordinates and description of Aughenbaugh Peak in Alberts (1995) shows it to the northeast of Neuberg Peak.) and the Cairn Ridge is to the north. To the west are the Hannah Peak and Walker Peak around the Enchanted Valley. The Brown Nunataks are west of the Enchanted Valley.

== Features ==
=== Clinton Spur ===
82°39′S 52°45′W. A rock spur on the south side of Dufek Massif, 1.5 nautical miles (2.8 km; 1.7 mi) southeast of Neuburg Peak. Mapped by USGS from surveys and United States Navy air photos, 1956-66. Named by US-ACAN for Lieutenant Clinton R. Smith, (MC) United States Navy, of the Ellsworth Station winter party, 1957.

=== Aughenbaugh Peak ===
82°37′S 52°49′W. A sharp peak, over 1,800 metres (5,900 ft) high, standing 0.7 nautical miles (1.3 km; 0.81 mi) northeast of Neuburg Peak. Mapped by USGS from surveys and United States Navy air photos, 1956-66. Named by US-ACAN for Nolan B. Aughenbaugh, glaciologist at Ellsworth Station, a member of the first party to visit Dufek Massif, in December 1957.

=== England Peak ===
82°37′S 52°49′W. A sharp peak about 2,150 metres (7,050 ft) high, located 0.5 nautical miles (0.93 km; 0.58 mi) south of Aughenbaugh Peak and east of Neuburg Peak. Named by US-ACAN at the suggestion of USGS field party leader Arthur B. Ford after Anthony W. England, USGS geophysicist who worked in the Dufek Massif during the 1976-77 and 1978-79 seasons.

=== Tranquillity Valley ===
82°36′S 52°55′W. A snow-covered valley between Hannah Peak and Cairn Ridge in the west part of Dufek Massif. The name was proposed by Arthur B. Ford, USGS geologist, leader of several USGS field parties to the Pensacola Mountains, 1965-79. Named from its typical weather conditions, the valley being protected from strong winds most of the time. The USGS snowmobile parties coming from cold, windy areas found welcome refuge in this valley. The name is also in accord with nearby Enchanted Valley to indicate the general beauty of this part of Dufek Massif.

=== Cairn Ridge ===
82°35′S 52°50′W. A rock ridge adjoining the north side of Dufek Massil, 2 nautical miles (3.7 km; 2.3 mi) northeast of Hannah Peak. Mapped by USGS from surveys and United States Navy air photos, 1956-66. A cairn was erected on this ridge during a visit in December 1957 by the US-IGY traverse party from Ellsworth Station.

=== Welcome Pass ===
82°35′S 52°45′W. A snow pass between Cairn Ridge and Czamanske Ridge, providing access to Tranquillity Valley. Named from association with Tranquillity Valley; also because during the 1976-77 season, Arthur B. Ford and Willis H. Nelson, of USGS, on discovery of a Soviet Antarctic Expedition helicopter cache left here the previous summer, left a note of welcome to the Dufek Massif for the Soviet Antarctic Expedition party leader, Garrik Grikurov.

=== Pyroxenite Promontory ===
82°37′S 53°00′W. A promontory rising to about 1,150 metres (3,770 ft) high near the west end of Dufek Massif. The feature is located west of Neuburg Peak and projects northwest toward Rautio Nunatak. The name was proposed by Arthur B. Ford, leader of the USGS geological party in the Pensacola Mountains, 1978-79, from the pyroxenite rock which forms a conspicuous dark layer along the cliffs of the promontory.

=== Rautio Nunatak ===
82°37′S 53°03′W. Nunatak rising to about 1,000 metres (3,300 ft) high between Neuburg Peak and Hannah Peak near the west end of Dufek Massif. Named by US-ACAN after Henry Rautio, photographer, United States Navy Squadron VX-6, who obtained reconnaissance photographs of the Pensacola Mountains from LC-47 aircraft on January 22, 1964.

=== Hannah Peak ===
82°36′S 53°10′W. A sharp peak at the southwest end of Dufek Massif 2 nautical miles (3.7 km; 2.3 mi) north-northeast of Walker Peak. Mapped by USGS from surveys and United States Navy air photos, 1956-66. Named by US-ACAN for James L. Hannah, construction electrician, who wintered-over at Ellsworth Station in 1957 and McMurdo Station in 1961.

=== Enchanted Valley ===
82°37′S 53°10′W. A small snow-filled valley between Walker Peak and Hannah Peak in the southwest end of Dufek Massif, Pensacola Mountains. The name describes the scenic beauty of the valley and was applied by the US-IGY party from Ellsworth Station that visited the valley in December 1957.

=== Walker Peak ===
82°38′S 53°13′W. A sharp peak, 1,495 metres (4,905 ft) high, marking the southwest extremity of Dufek Massif. Mapped by USGS from surveys and United States Navy air photos, 1956-66. Named by US-ACAN for Paul T. Walker, glaciologist at Ellsworth Station, a member of the first party to visit Dufek Massif, in December 1957.

=== Brown Nunataks ===
82°37′S 53°30′W. Three nunataks lying 1 nautical mile (1.9 km; 1.2 mi) northwest of Walker Peak at the southwest extremity of Dufek Massif. Mapped by USGS from surveys and United States Navy air photos, 1956-66. Named by US-ACAN for John B. Brown, ionospheric scientist, Ellsworth Station winter party, 1957.

== Sources ==
- Alberts, Fred G., ed. (1995), Geographic Names of the Antarctic (PDF) (2 ed.), United States Board on Geographic Names This article incorporates public domain material from websites or documents of the United States Board on Geographic Names.
- Cordiner Peaks, USGS: United States Geological Survey
- This article incorporates public domain material from websites or documents of the United States Geological Survey.
