= Nolan Williams =

Nolan Williams is the name of:

- Nolan Williams (composer) (born 1969), American composer
- Nolan Williams (politician) (1941–2022), American politician
- Nolan R. Williams (1982–2025), American physician known for his work on transcranial magnetic stimulation
