= Saratoga Table =

Plateau in Antarctica

- Location within Antarctica

Highest point
- Coordinates: 83°20′S 50°30′W

Geography
- Parent range: Pensacola Mountains

The Saratoga Table (83°20′S 50°30′W) is a high, flat, snow-covered plateau, 8 nautical miles (15 km; 9.2 mi) long and 6 nautical miles (11 km; 6.9 mi) wide, standing just south of Kent Gap and Lexington Table in the southern Forrestal Range, Pensacola Mountains, Antarctica.

== Discovery and name ==
The Saratoga Table was discovered and photographed on January 13, 1956 on a transcontinental nonstop flight by personnel of United States Navy Operation Deep Freeze I from McMurdo Sound to the vicinity of the Weddell Sea and return. I was named by the United States Advisory Committee on Antarctic Names (US-ACAN) for the USS Saratoga of 1926, one of the first large aircraft carriers of the United States Navy.

== Location ==
The Saratoga Table is bounded by the Support Force Glacier to the east and the Median Snowfield to the southwest. It is separated from the Lexington Table to the north by May Valley, Kent Gap and Chambers Glacier. Features, clockwise from the north, include Sorna Bluff, Mount Hummer, Mount Hook, Ronald Rock, Skidmore Cliff, Vigen Cliffs, Gabbro Crest, Sheriff Cliffs, Fierle Peak, Dyrdal Peak, Mount Stephens, Magnetite Bluff, Mathis Spur, Burmester Dome and Huie Cliffs. Features in the snowfield to the southeast include Haskill Nunatak, Ray Nunatak, Beiszer Nunatak, Grob Ridge and Coal Rock.

== Features ==
Most of the features were mapped by the USGS from surveys and United States Navy air photographs in 1956–66.

=== May Valley ===
83°18′S 51°10′W. A nearly flat snow-covered valley along the west flank of Forrestal Range, at the juncture of the Lexington and Saratoga Tables. Named by US-ACAN for Walter H. May, aerographer at Ellsworth Station, winter 1957.

=== Kent Gap ===
83°17′S 50°30′W. An ice-filled gap connecting the heads of May Valley and Chambers Glacier and marking the divide between Lexington and Saratoga Tables. Named by US-ACAN for Kenneth K. Kent, electronics technician at Ellsworth Station, winter 1957.

=== Sorna Bluff ===
83°18′S 50°40′W. A prominent rock bluff on the north side of Saratoga Table, overlooking the head of May Valley. Named by US-ACAN for Lieutenant Commander Ronald E. Sorna, United States Navy, pilot on photographic flights in the Pensacola Mountains.

=== Mount Hummer ===
83°17′S 50°06′W. A snow-covered, bluff-type mountain on the southwest side of the head of Chambers Glacier, northeast Saratoga Table. Named by US-ACAN in 1979 after Doctor Michael G. Hummer, M.D., Oklahoma Medical Research Foundation, a researcher in biomedicine and the physician at South Pole Station, winter party 1975.

=== Mount Hook ===
83°20′S 50°00′W. A mountainous snow-covered projection from the east side of Saratoga Table, 5 nautical miles (9.3 km; 5.8 mi) southeast of Sorna Bluff. Named by US-ACAN in 1979 after Lieutenant Richard M. Hook, United States Navy, Medical Officer at South Pole Station, winter party 1969.

=== Ronald Rock ===
83°20′S 49°25′W. A prominent rock, 1,145 metres (3,757 ft) high, along the cliff next north of Skidmore Cliff, located east of Saratoga Table. Named by US-ACAN for Ronald D. Brown, aviation structural mechanic at Ellsworth Station, winter 1957.

=== Skidmore Cliff ===
83°24′S 49°30′W. An irregular east-facing cliff, 4 nautical miles (7.4 km; 4.6 mi) long, located at the extremity of a spur trending eastward from Saratoga Table. Named by US-ACAN for Donald D. Skidmore, ionospheric scientist at Ellsworth Station, winter 1957.

=== Vigen Cliffs ===
83°23′S 50°07′W. Cliffs rising to about 1,750 metres (5,740 ft) high to the east of Gabbro Crest. Named by US-ACAN in 1979 for Oscar C. Vigen, Budget and Planning Officer, Division of Polar Programs, National Science Foundation, 1968–85.

=== Gabbro Crest ===
83°28′S 50°22′W. The crest about 1,750 metres (5,740 ft) high of the mountain spur between Sheriff Cliffs and Vigen Cliffs on the southeast edge of Saratoga Table. So named in 1979 by US-ACAN, at the suggestion of Arthur B. Ford, USGS geologist, from the dominant rock type of the Forrestal Range.

=== Sheriff Cliffs ===
83°24′S 50°37′W. Cliffs rising to about 1,750 metres (5,740 ft) high to the west of Gabbro Crest. Named by US-ACAN in 1979 after Steven D. Sheriff, geologist, Western Washington State University, Bellingham, WA, who worked in this area, 1978–79.

=== Fierle Peak ===
83°25′S 50°58′W. A sharp peak, 1,960 metres (6,430 ft) high, standing 3 nautical miles (5.6 km; 3.5 mi) east-southeast of Dyrdal Peak at the south extremity of Saratoga Table. Named by US-ACAN for Gerard R. Fierle, meteorologist at Ellsworth Station, winter 1957.

=== Dyrdal Peak ===
83°25′S 51°23′W. A peak, 1,820 metres (5,970 ft) high, standing at the southwest extremity of Saratoga Table, 2 nautical miles (3.7 km; 2.3 mi) west-northwest of Fierle Peak. Named by US-ACAN for Frederick F. Dyrdal, aviation structural mechanic at Ellsworth Station, winter 1957.

=== Mount Stephens ===
83°23′S 51°27′W. A prominent mountain, 2,065 metres (6,775 ft) high, surmounting the west extremity of Saratoga Table. Mapped by USGS from surveys and United States Navy air photos, 1956–66. Named by US-ACAN for Lieutenant Commander H.E. Stephens, United States Navy, leader of the unit from Mobile Construction Battalion One which constructed Ellsworth Station in January-February, 1957.

=== Magnetite Bluff ===
83°22′S 51°15′W. A bluff 2 nautical miles (3.7 km; 2.3 mi) northeast of Mount Stephens on the west side of Saratoga Table. Named by US-ACAN, 1979, at the suggestion of Arthur B. Ford and following USGS geological work in the area, from the extensive occurrences of magnetite in the gabbro of this area which cause large magnetic anomalies over the Forrestal Range.

=== Mathis Spur ===
83°20′S 51°17′W. A rock spur along the west side of Saratoga Table, 3 nautical miles (5.6 km; 3.5 mi) north of Mount Stephens. Named by US-ACAN for Melvin Mathis, hospital corpsman at Ellsworth Station, winter 1957.

=== Burmester Dome ===
83°22′S 50°56′W. An ice-capped dome rising to 2,095 metres (6,873 ft) high in west-central Saratoga Table. At the suggestion of USGS party leader Arthur B. Ford, named by US-ACAN after Russell F. Burmester, geologist, Western Washington State University, Bellingham, WA, who worked in the Forrestal Range, 1978–79.

=== Huie Cliffs ===
83°19′S 51°03′W. Steep rock cliffs rising above May Valley and forming the northwest edge of Saratoga Table. Named by US-ACAN for Carl Huie, technician in Antarctica, 1976–77, and geologist with USGS in the Pensacola Mountains, 1978–79.

== Southwest features ==
Features to the southwest of the table include:

=== Himmelberg Hills ===
83.4°S 51.7666667°W. A linear group of hills with prominent rock outcrops, 11.5 nautical miles (21.3 km; 13.2 mi) long, at the southwest end of Saratoga Table. Named features in the group include Haskill Nunatak, near the center, and Ray Nunatak and Beiszer Nunatak at the south end. Named after Glen R. Himmelberg, Department of Geology, University of Missouri-Columbia. His laboratory research and scientific reporting with A.B. Ford (1973–91) on the petrology of Antarctica and specifically on the Dufek intrusion of the northern Pensacola Mountains was critical for the understanding of the evolution of this major igneous complex.

=== Haskill Nunatak ===
83°24′S 51°45′W. An elongate nunatak, 1,710 metres (5,610 ft) high, standing 2.5 nautical miles (4.6 km; 2.9 mi) west of Dyrdal Peak in southern Forrestal Range. Named by US-ACAN for Robert E. Haskill, radioman at Ellsworth Station, winter 1957.

=== Ray Nunatak ===
83°28′S 51°58′W. A nunatak, 1,630 metres (5,350 ft) high, located just north of Beiszer Nunatak and 5 nautical miles (9.3 km; 5.8 mi) southwest of Dyrdal Peak in southern Forrestal Range. Named by US-ACAN for James A. Ray, utilities man at Ellsworth Station, winter 1957.

=== Beiszer Nunatak ===
83°29′S 51°57′W. A nunatak, 1,630 metres (5,350 ft) high, standing 1 nautical mile (1.9 km; 1.2 mi) south of Ray Nunatak at the southwest end of Forrestal Range. Named by US-ACAN for John E. Beiszer, aviation structural mechanic at Ellsworth Station, winter 1957.

=== Grob Ridge ===
83°29′S 51°22′W. A narrow ridge, 3 nautical miles (5.6 km; 3.5 mi) long, located 3 nautical miles (5.6 km; 3.5 mi) south of Dyrdal Peak at the south end of Forrestal Range. Named by US-ACAN for Richard W. Grob, cook at Ellsworth Station, winter 1957.

=== Coal Rock ===
83°29′S 50°38′W. A prominent nunatak lying 4 nautical miles (7.4 km; 4.6 mi) southeast of Fierle Peak at the south end of Forrestal Range, Pensacola Mountains. Named by Dwight L. Schmidt, USGS geologist to these mountains, for the Permian coal that is well exposed on the nunatak.

== Sources ==
- Alberts, Fred G., ed. (1995), Geographic Names of the Antarctic (PDF) (2 ed.), United States Board on Geographic Names This article incorporates public domain material from websites or documents of the United States Board on Geographic Names.
- "Himmelberg Hills", Geographic Names Information System, United States Geological Survey, United States Department of the Interior
- Saratoga Table, USGS: United States Geological Survey
- This article incorporates public domain material from websites or documents of the United States Geological Survey.
