= Forrestal Range =

Mountain range in the Pensacola Mountains of Antarctica

Forrestal Range in Antarctica

The Forrestal Range (83°00′S 049°30′W) is a largely snow-covered mountain range, about 65 nautical miles (120 km; 75 mi) long, standing east of Dufek Massif and the Neptune Range in the Pensacola Mountains, Antarctica.

== Discovery and name ==
The Forrestal Range was discovered and photographed on 13 January 1956 on a transcontinental patrol plane flight of United States Navy Operation Deep Freeze I from McMurdo Sound to the vicinity of the Weddell Sea and return. It was named by the United States Advisory Committee on Antarctic Names (US-ACAN) after USS Forrestal, first supercarrier of the U.S. Navy. The entire Pensacola Mountains were mapped by United States Geological Survey (USGS) in 1967 and 1968 from United States Navy tricamera aerial photographs taken in 1964.

== Location ==
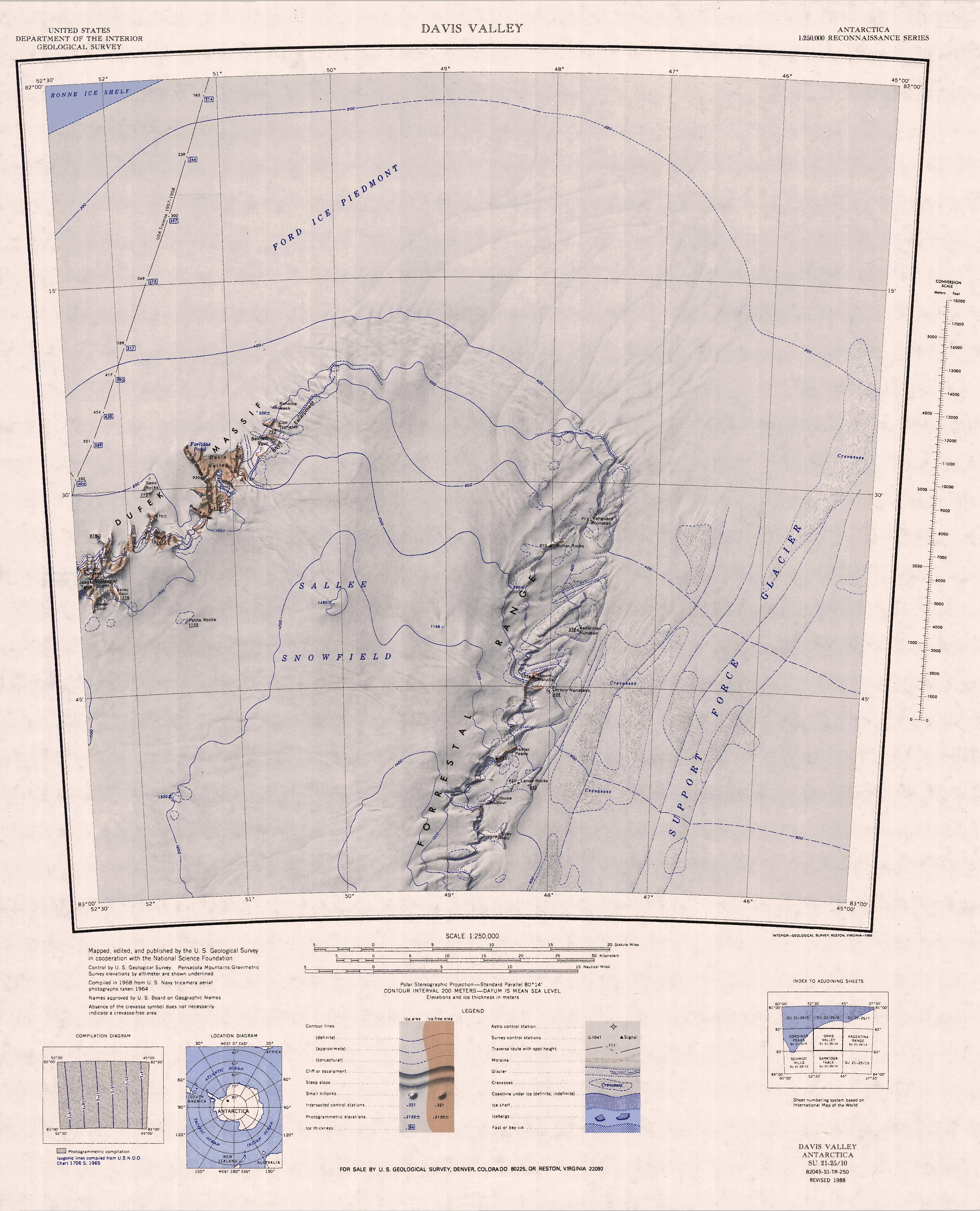
Northern Forrestal Range in center, south of map

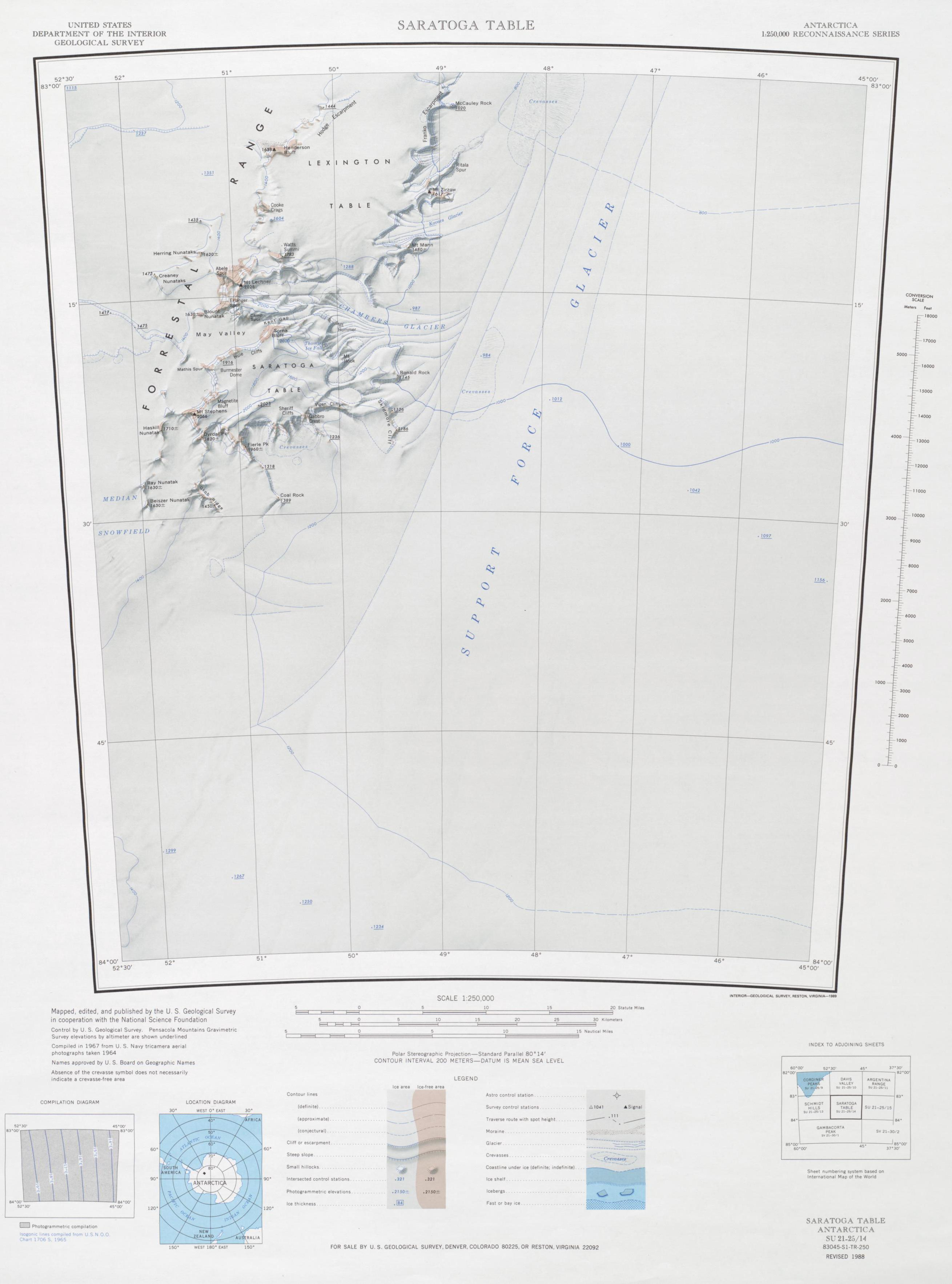
South part of Forrestal Range in northwest of map

The Forrestal Range extends in a north-northeast direction along the west side of the Support Force Glacier. The Median Snowfield is to its south and the Sallee Snowfield to its west, separating it from the Dufek Massif. The Ford Ice Piedmont is to its north. Major features from south to north include the Saratoga Table, Lexington Table, Kester Peaks and Mount Malville.

== Major glaciers and snowfields ==
- Support Force Glacier (82°45′S 046°30′W), a major glacier in the Pensacola Mountains, draining northward between the Forrestal Range and Argentina Range to the Filchner-Ronne Ice Shelf.
- Median Snowfield (83°30′S 52°30′W), a large snowfield in the Pensacola Mountains between Torbert Escarpment and the southern part of the Forrestal Range.
- Sallee Snowfield (82°37′S 50°20′W), a large snowfield between the Dufek Massif and northern Forrestal Range.
- Ford Ice Piedmont (82°10′S 50°00′W), the large ice piedmont lying northward of Dufek Massif and Forrestal Range between the lower ends of Foundation Ice Stream and Support Force Glacier.

== Peaks ==
Peaks over 1,500 metres (4,900 ft) high include:

Mountain	m	ft	coord
Burmester Dome	2,095	6,873	83°22′S 50°56′W
Mount Stephens	2,065	6,775	83°23′S 51°27′W
Mount Lechner	2,030	6,660	83°14′S 50°55′W
Fierle Peak	1,960	6,430	83°25′S 50°58′W
Dyrdal Peak	1,820	5,970	83°25′S 51°23′W
Watts Summit	1,785	5,856	83°12′S 50°31′W
Vigen Cliffs	1,750	5,740	83°23′S 50°07′W
Gabbro Crest	1,750	5,740	83°28′S 50°22′W
Sheriff Cliffs	1,750	5,740	83°24′S 50°37′W
Haskill Nunatak	1,710	5,610	83°24′S 51°45′W
Mount Mann	1,680	5,510	83°12′S 49°20′W
Henderson Bluff	1,660	5,450	83°05′S 50°35′W
Ray Nunatak	1,630	5,350	83°28′S 51°58′W
Blount Nunatak	1,630	5,350	83°16′S 51°19′W
Beiszer Nunatak	1,630	5,350	83°29′S 51°57′W
Mount Zirzow	1,615	5,299	83°08′S 49°06′W

== Feature groupings ==
Features that are the focus of a group of lesser or related features include

- Mount Malville (82°44′S 48°10′W), a mountain, 1,030 metres (3,380 ft) high, standing 5 nautical miles (9.3 km; 5.8 mi) southwest of Ackerman Nunatak in the northern part of the Forrestal Range.
- Kester Peaks (82°49′S 48°23′W) are three aligned rock peaks standing together 5 nautical miles (9.3 km; 5.8 mi) south of Mount Malville on the east side of the Forrestal Range.
- Lexington Table (83°05′S 49°45′W), a high, flat, snow-covered plateau, about 15 nautical miles (28 km; 17 mi) long and 10 nautical miles (19 km; 12 mi) wide, standing just north of Kent Gap and Saratoga Table.
- Saratoga Table (83°20′S 50°30′W), a high, flat, snow-covered plateau, 8 nautical miles (15 km; 9.2 mi) long and 6 nautical miles (11 km; 6.9 mi) wide, standing just south of Kent Gap and Lexington Table in the southern Forrestal Range.

== Sources ==
- Alberts, Fred G., ed. (1995), Geographic Names of the Antarctic (PDF) (2 ed.), United States Board on Geographic Names This article incorporates public domain material from websites or documents of the United States Board on Geographic Names.
- Davis Valley, USGS: United States Geological Survey
- Saratoga Table, USGS: United States Geological Survey
- This article incorporates public domain material from websites or documents of the United States Geological Survey.
