= Dufek Massif =

Largely snow-covered massif in the Pensacola Mountains, Antarctica

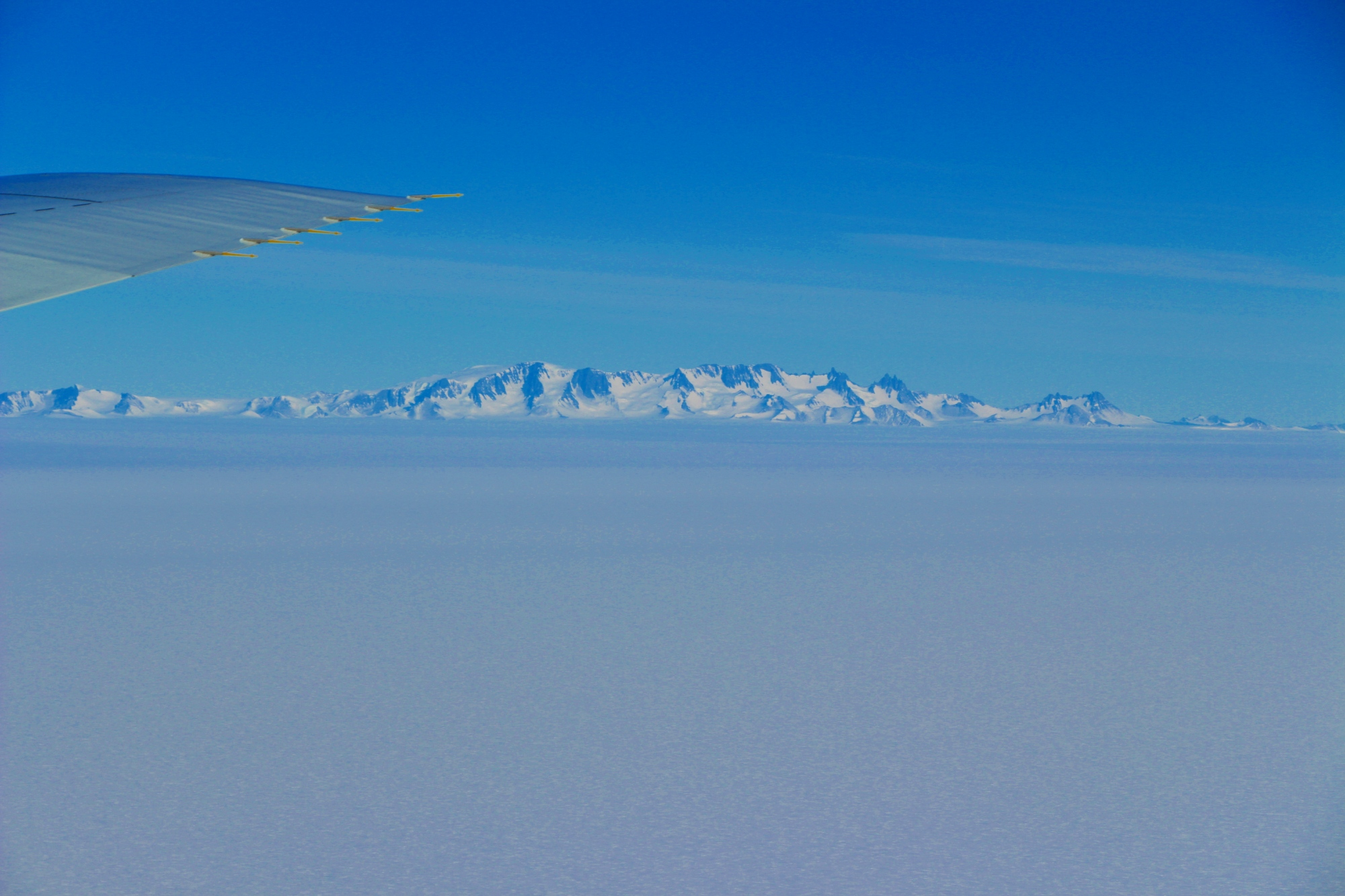
- Dufek Massif from a distance

Highest point
- Elevation: 2,150 m (7,050 ft)

Geography
- Location within Antarctica
- Continent: Antarctica
- Range coordinates: 82°36′S 52°30′W
- Parent range: Pensacola Mountains

The Dufek Massif (82°36′S 52°30′W) is a rugged, largely snow-covered massif 27 nautical miles (50 km; 31 mi) long, standing west of the Forrestal Range in the northern part of the Pensacola Mountains, Antarctica.

== Discovery and name ==
The Dufek Massif was discovered and photographed on January 13, 1956, on a transcontinental patrol plane flight of United States Navy Operation Deep Freeze from McMurdo Sound to the vicinity of the Weddell Sea and return. It was named by the United States Advisory Committee on Antarctic Names (US-ACAN) for Rear Admiral George J. Dufek (Note: Dufek Coast, Dufek Head, and Dufek Mountain are also named for Rear Admiral George J. Dufek.) United States Navy, who was in direct operational command of United States Navy Task Force 43 during that operation. The entire Pensacola Mountains were mapped by the United States Geological Survey (USGS) in 1967 and 1968 from ground surveys and U.S. Navy tricamera aerial photographs taken in 1964.

== Location ==
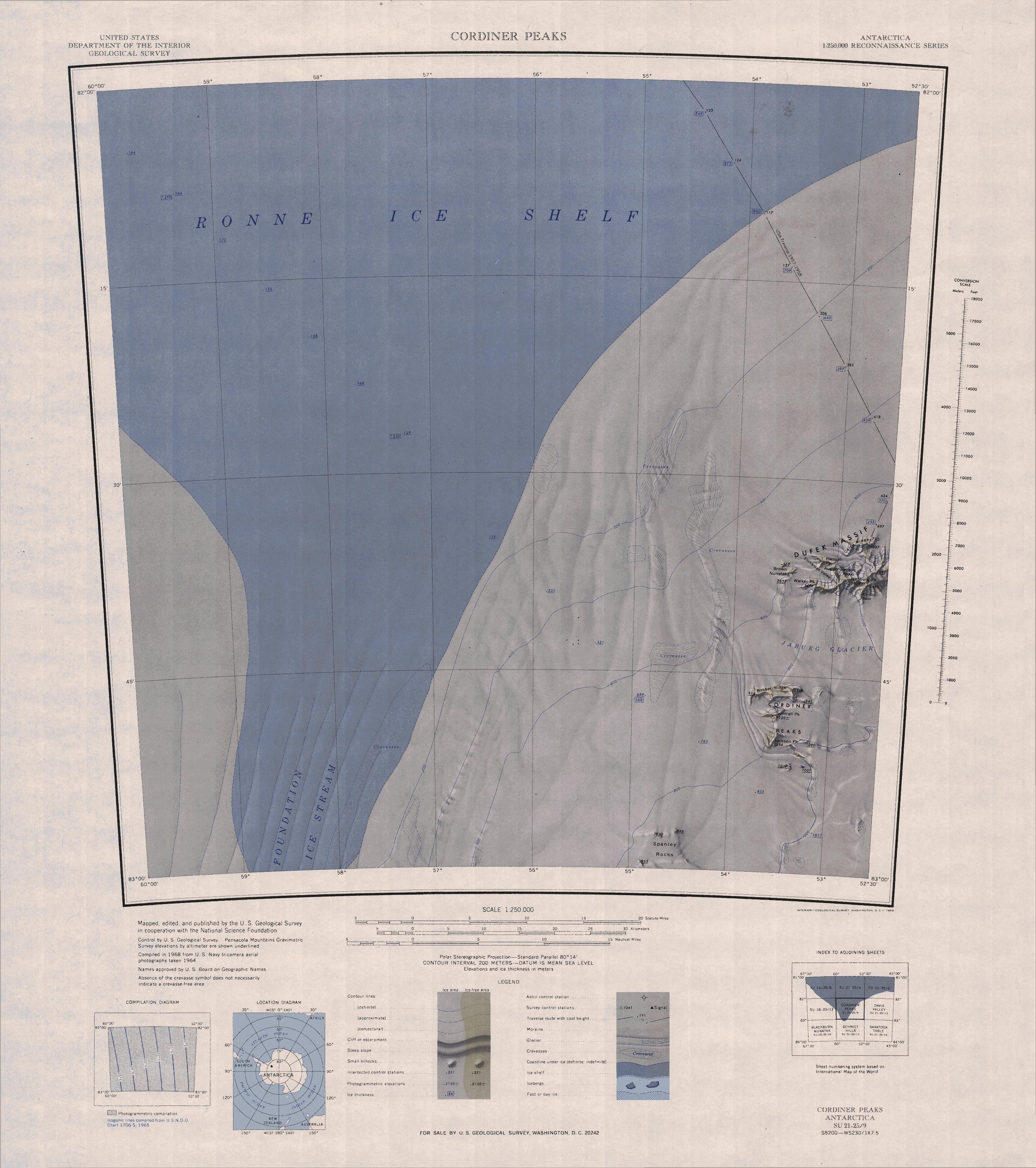
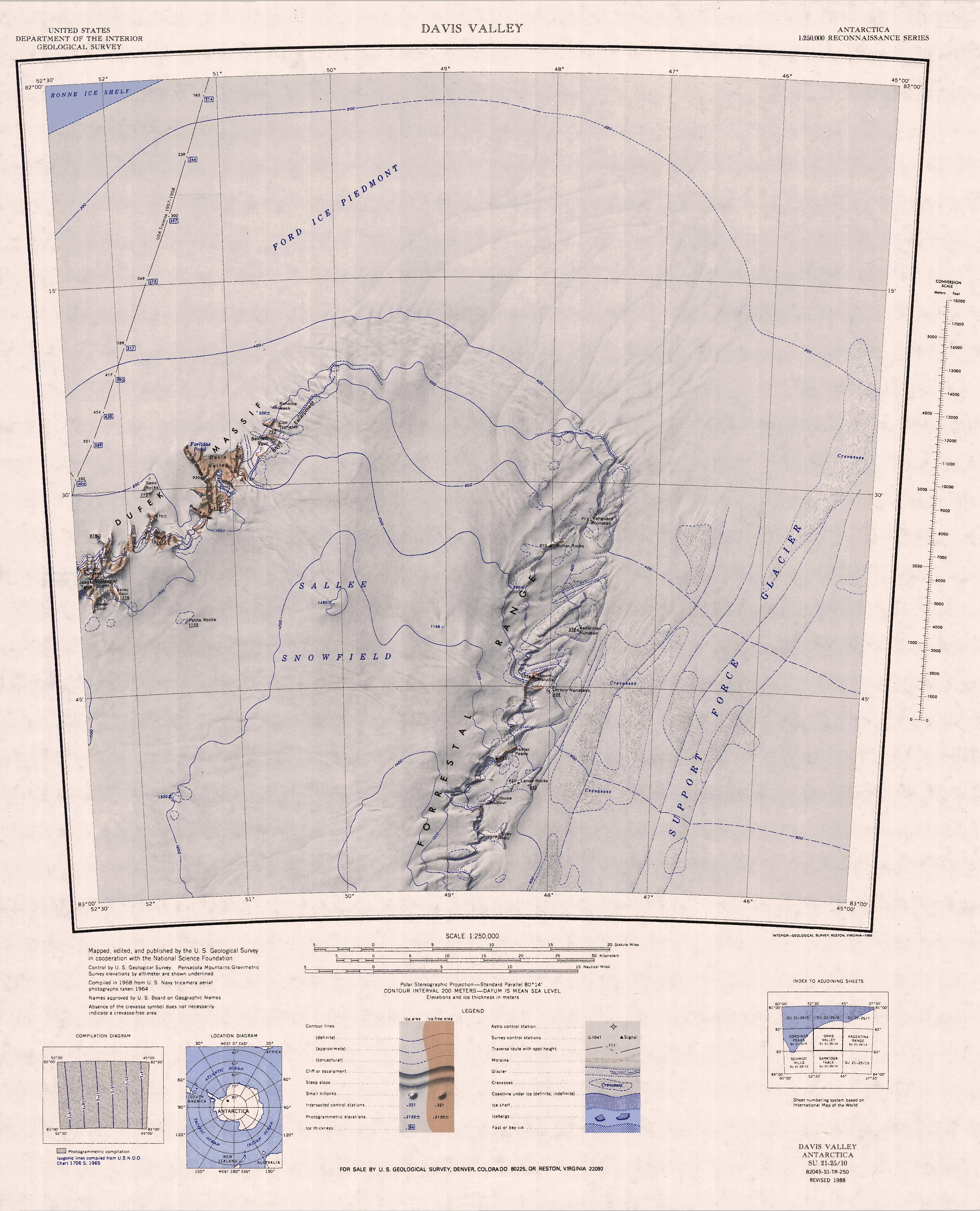
Dufek Massif in center of the pair of maps

The Dufek Massif runs southwest-northeast in the northwest of the Pensalcola Mountains. It is to the east of the mouth of the Foundation Ice Stream, where it joins the Ronne Ice Shelf. It is south of the Ford Ice Piedmont. The Jaburg Glacier flows west past its southwest end, separating it from the Cordiner Peaks to the south. The Sallee Snowfield is to its east, separating it from the Forrestal Range. Major features, from southwest to northeast, include Neuburg Peak, Jaeger Table, Davis Valley and Boyd Escarpment.

== Glaciers and snowfield ==
- Foundation Ice Stream (83°15′S 60°00′W), a major ice stream in the Pensacola Mountains of Antarctica. The ice stream drains northward for 150 nautical miles (280 km; 170 mi) along the west side of the Patuxent Range and the Neptune Range to enter the Ronne Ice Shelf westward of Dufek Massif.
- Ford Ice Piedmont (82°10′S 50°00′W), a large ice piedmont lying northward of Dufek Massif and Forrestal Range between the lower ends of Foundation Ice Stream and Support Force Glacier, in the Pensacola Mountains.
- Sallee Snowfield (82°37′S 50°20′W), a large snowfield between the Dufek Massif and northern Forrestal Range].
- Jaburg Glacier (82°42′S 53°25′W), a broad glacier draining westward between Dufek Massif and Cordiner Peaks.

== Features ==
Geographical features include:

- Neuburg Peak (82°37′S 52°54′W), a jagged rock peak 1,840 metres (6,040 ft) high, rising 2.5 nautical miles (4.6 km; 2.9 mi) east of Walker Peak in the southwest part of the Dufek Massif.
- Jaeger Table (82°36′S 52°30′W), the ice-covered summit plateau of Dufek Massif, rising to 2,030 metres (6,660 ft) at Worcester Summit.
- Davis Valley (82°28′S 51°9′W), an ice-free valley just east of Floridas Ridge in north-east Dufek Massif.
- Boyd Escarpment (82°26′S 50°30′W), a rock and snow escarpment which extends northeast for 10 nautical miles (19 km; 12 mi) from Wujek Ridge. It includes Bennett Spur, Cox Nunatak and Rankine Rock.

== Sources ==
- Alberts, Fred G., ed. (1995), Geographic Names of the Antarctic (PDF) (2 ed.), United States Board on Geographic Names This article incorporates public domain material from websites or documents of the United States Board on Geographic Names.
- Cordiner Peaks, USGS: United States Geological Survey
- Davis Valley, USGS: United States Geological Survey
- "Dufek Head", Geographic Names Information System, United States Geological Survey, United States Department of the Interior
- This article incorporates public domain material from websites or documents of the United States Geological Survey.
