= Support Force Glacier =

Glacier in Antarctica

- Location within Antarctica
- Location: Queen Elizabeth Land
- Coordinates: 82°45′S 046°30′W
- Terminus: Filchner-Ronne Ice Shelf

The Support Force Glacier (82°45′S 046°30′W) is a major glacier in the Pensacola Mountains, draining northward between the Forrestal Range and Argentina Range to the Filchner-Ronne Ice Shelf.

== Mapping and name ==
The Support Force Glacier was mapped by the United States Geological Survey (USGS) from surveys and United States Navy air photographs in 1956–66. It was named by the United States Advisory Committee on Antarctic Names (US-ACAN) for the United States Naval Support Force Antarctica, which provided logistical support for the United States Antarctic Program during this period.

== Location ==
The Support Force Glacier flows in a north-northeast direction past the Forrestal Range to its west. It is fed by the Chambers Glacier from the west, which separates the Saratoga Table from the Lexington Table in the Forrestal Range. Further north it passes the Argentina Range to the east. The San Martín Glacier enters from the east, flowing between the Schneider Hills and the Panzarini Hills in this range.

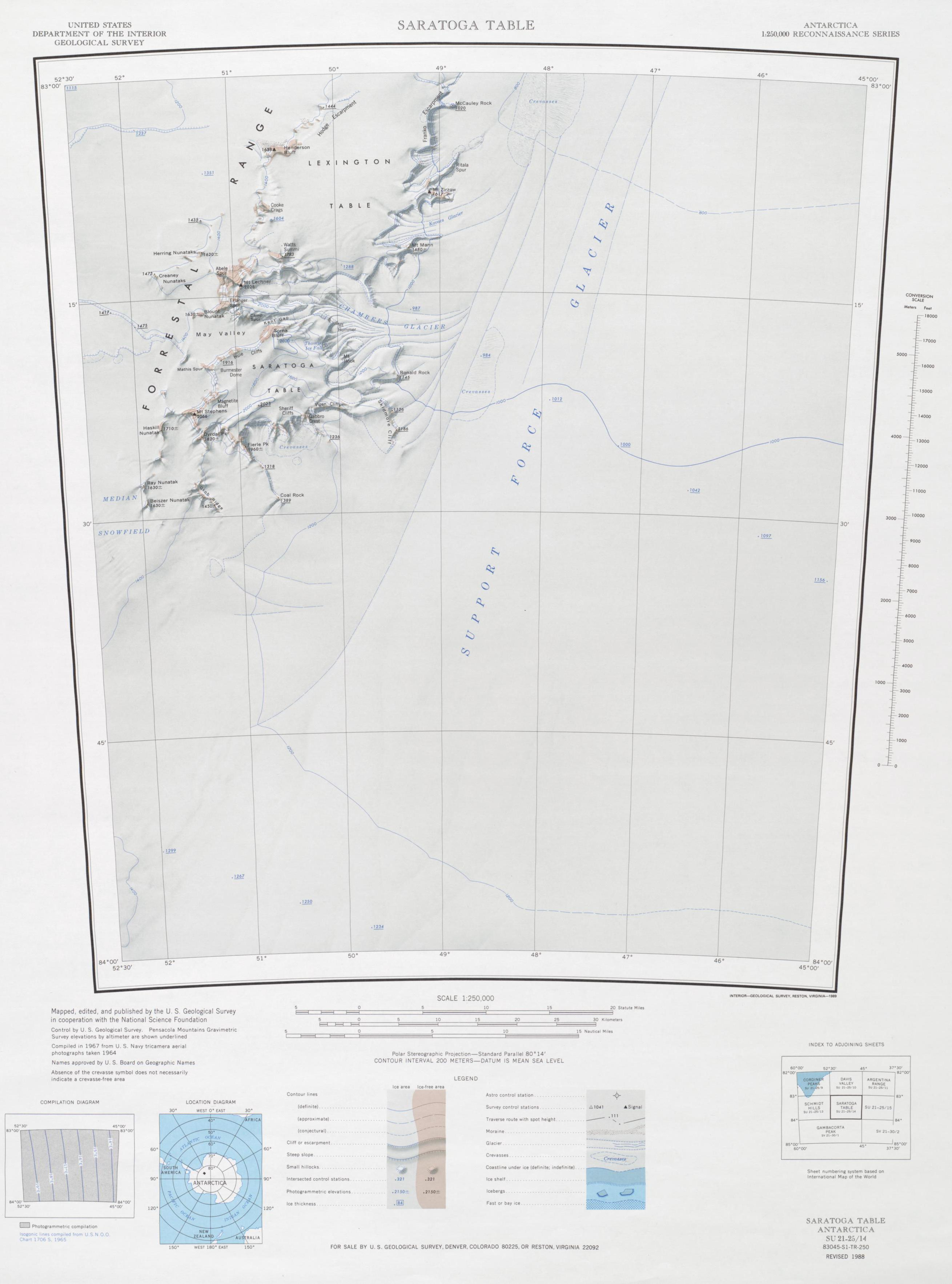
Upper Support Force Glacier in center of map

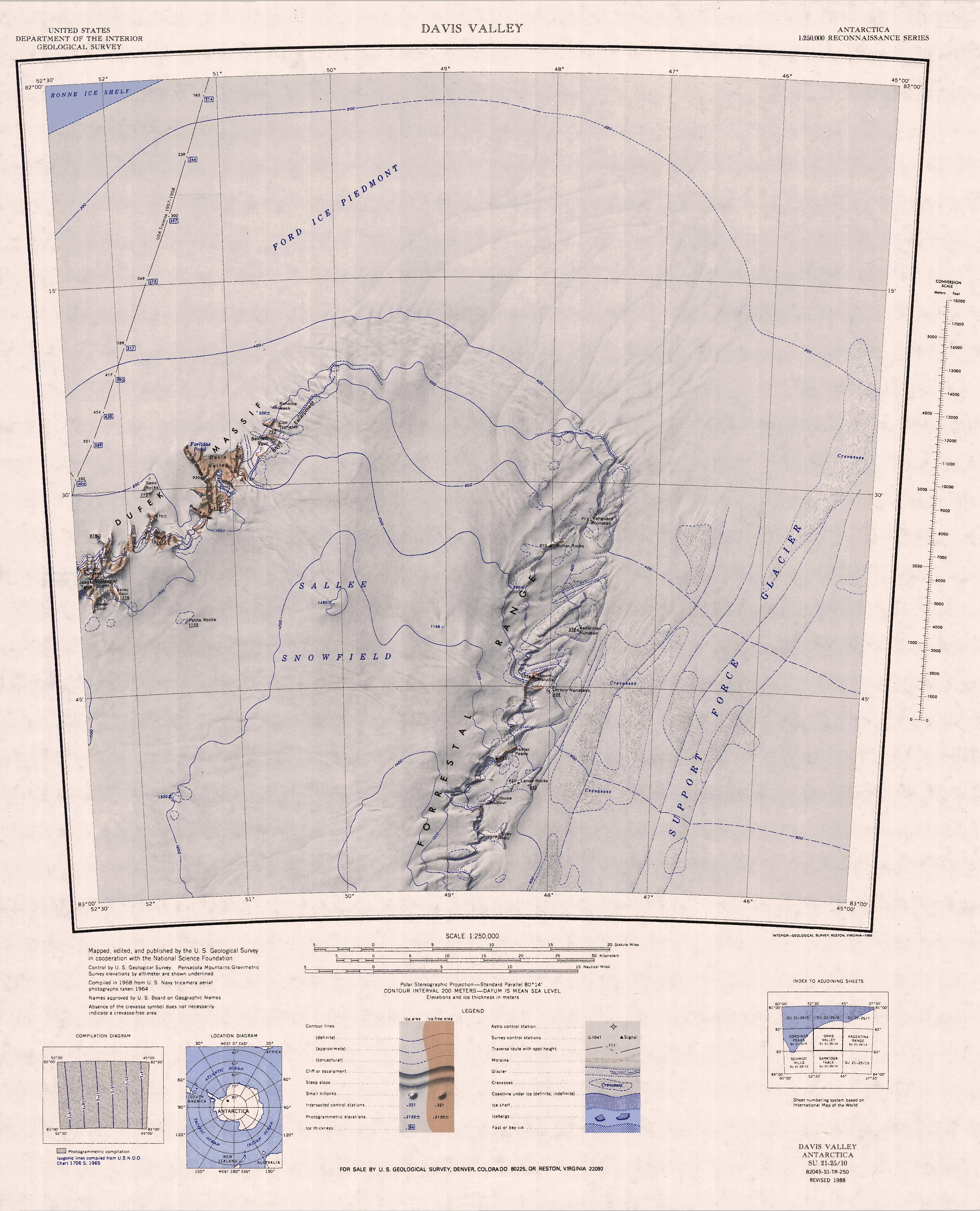
Lower Support Force Glacier in east of map

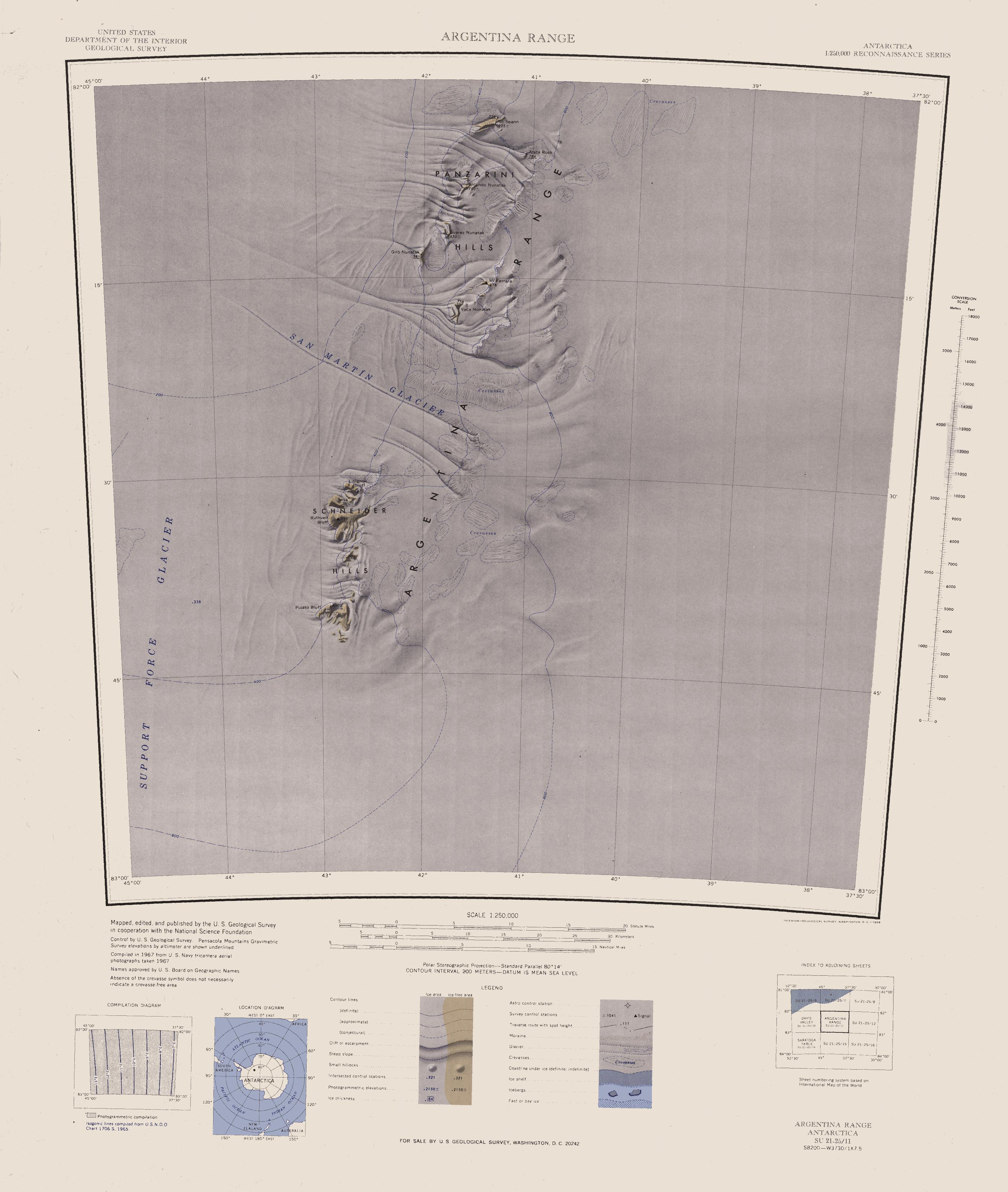
Lower Support Force Glacier in west of map

== Tributaries and features ==
=== Chambers Glacier ===
83°17′S 49°25′W.

A glacier in the Forrestal Range, draining east from Mount Lechner and Kent Gap, at the juncture of the Saratoga and Lexington Tables, to enter Support Force Glacier. It was discovered and photographed on January 13, 1956 on a transcontinental patrol plane flight of United States Navy Operation Deep Freeze I from McMurdo Sound to the vicinity of Weddell Sea and return. It was named by the US-ACAN after Captain Washington I. Chambers, United States Navy, one of the pioneers in the development of the airplane catapult for ships.

=== Thompo Icefall ===
83°18′S 50°08′W.

An icefall at the northeast edge of Saratoga Table between Mount Hummer and Mount Hook, in the Forrestal Range. It was mapped by USGS in 1967 from ground surveys and United States Navy aerial photographs taken in 1964. It was named by US-ACAN in 1979 after Robert W. Thompson, photographer of United States Navy Squadron VX-6 in the Balleny Islands and Sky-Hi Nunataks areas, 1963-64, and in the Pensacola Mountains, 1964-65. "Thompo" is a nickname by which he and other family members have been known.

=== Kovacs Glacier ===
83°11′S 49°15′W.

Glacier on the southeast side of Lexington Table, flowing east-northeast into Support Force Glacier in the Forrestal Range. It was named by US-ACAN in 1979 after Austin Kovacs, leader of the 1973-74 USARP-CRREL survey party (with G. Erlanger and G. Abele) in this area; also worked in the McMurdo Sound area.

=== San Martín Glacier ===
82°24′S 42°14′W.

A broad glacier flowing westward and bisecting the Argentina Range. It was mapped by USGS from surveys and United States Navy air photos, 1956-67. It was named by US-ACAN for the Argentine icebreaker General San Martín, which brought the first party to General Belgrano Station on the Filchner Ice Shelf in 1954-55 and made numerous relief and resupply voyages to the area.

== Sources ==
- Alberts, Fred G., ed. (1995), Geographic Names of the Antarctic (PDF) (2 ed.), United States Board on Geographic Names This article incorporates public domain material from websites or documents of the United States Board on Geographic Names.
- Argentina Range, USGS: United States Geological Survey
- Davis Valley, USGS: United States Geological Survey
- Saratoga Table, USGS: United States Geological Survey
- This article incorporates public domain material from websites or documents of the United States Geological Survey.
