= Sallee Snowfield =

Snow field of Queen Elizabeth Land, Antarctica

- Location within Antarctica
- Location: Queen Elizabeth Land
- Coordinates: 82°37′S 50°20′W

Sallee Snowfield (82°37′S 50°20′W) is a large snowfield between the Dufek Massif and northern Forrestal Range in the Pensacola Mountains, Antarctica.

== Mapping and name ==
The Sallee Snowfield was mapped by United States Geological Survey (USGS) from surveys and United States Navy air photos, 1956–66. Named by Advisory Committee on Antarctic Names (US-ACAN) for Lieutenant Commander Ralph W. Sallee, Assistant Meteorological Officer on the staff of the Commander, United States Naval Support Force, Antarctica, in 1967 and 1968.

== Location ==
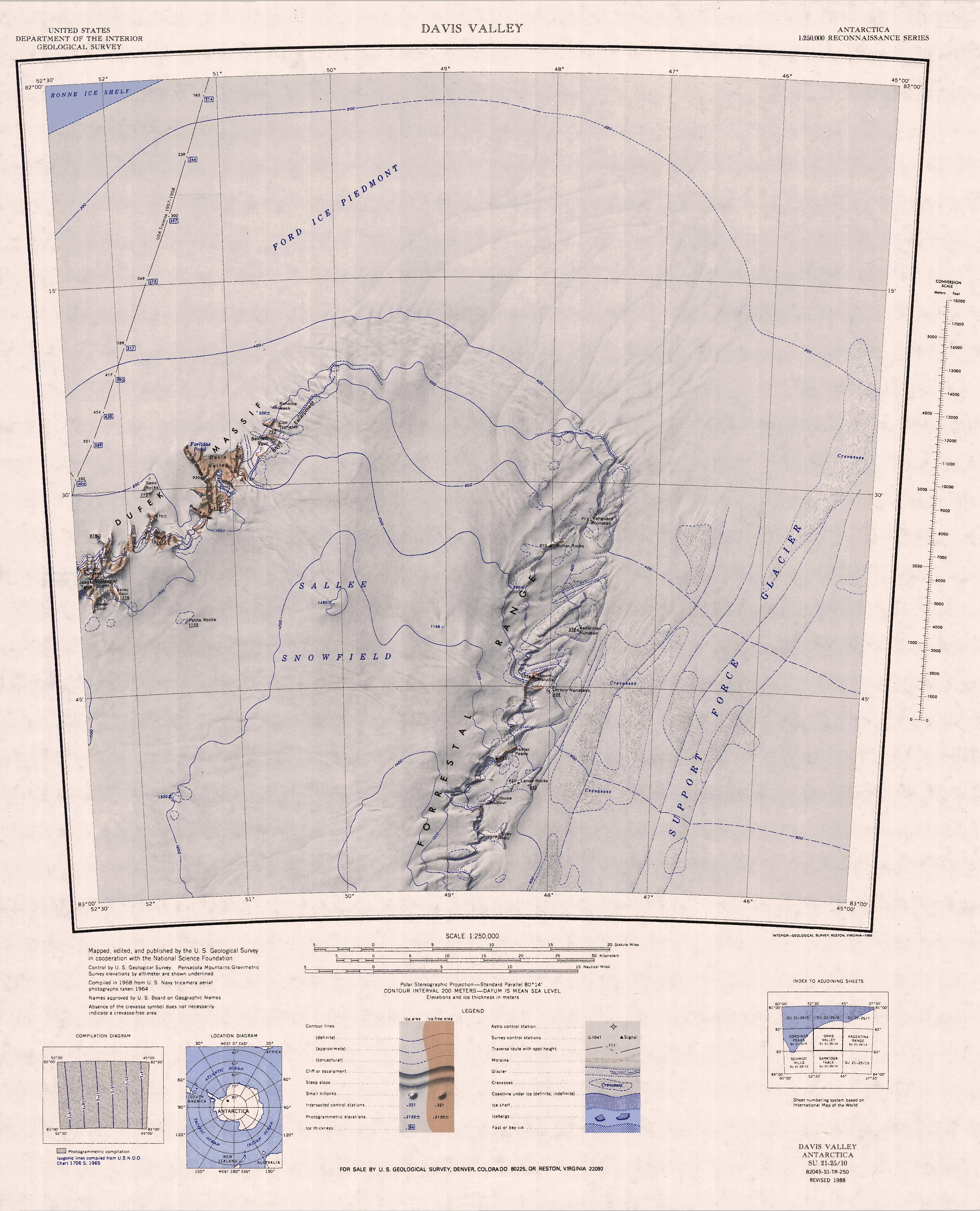
Sallee Snowfield in southwest of map

The Sallee Snowfield is between the Dufek Massif to the northwest and the Forrestal Range to the southeast. In the north it descends to the Ford Ice Piedmont. The Petite Rocks are in the east of the snowfield. A glacier drains north from the snowfield past the Davis Valley in the northeastern Dufek Massif to the Ford Ice Piedmont. The Edge Glacier extends from the snowfield into the Davis Valley for about 4 kilometres (2.5 mi). Rocks of the Dufek Intrusion are visible in the Dufuk Massif and the Forrestal Range, and are thought to be connected below the Sallee Snowfield.

== Nearby features ==
=== Ford Ice Piedmont ===
82°10′S 50°00′W. The large ice piedmont lying northward of Dufek Massif and Forrestal Range between the lower ends of Foundation Ice Stream and Support Force Glacier. Named by US-ACAN after Arthur B. Ford of the USGS, Menlo Park, CA, geologist and co-leader (with Peter F. Bermel) of the USGS party in the Thiel Mountains, 1960-61 (leader 1961-62); field work at Lassiter Coast, 1970-71; leader of geological parties to the Pensacola Mountains in 1965-66, 1973-74, 1976-77, and 1978-79.

=== Edge Glacier ===
82°29′S 51°07′W. A small cliff-type glacier draining northward into Davis Valley. Mapped by USGS from surveys and United States Navy air photos, 1956-66. Named by US-ACAN for Joseph L. Edge, photographer with United States Navy Squadron VX-6 on Operation Deep Freeze 1963 and 1964.

=== Petite Rocks ===
82°40′S 51°30′W. Two small isolated rocks in the west part of Sallee Snowfield, about 5 nautical miles (9.3 km; 5.8 mi) east of central Dufek Massif. Mapped by USGS from surveys and United States Navy air photos, 1956-66. The name applied by US-ACAN is descriptive of their small size.

== Sources ==
- Alberts, Fred G., ed. (1995), Geographic Names of the Antarctic (PDF) (2 ed.), United States Board on Geographic Names This article incorporates public domain material from websites or documents of the United States Board on Geographic Names.
- Davis Valley, USGS: United States Geological Survey
- Ford, Arthur B. (1976), Page 1 Stratigraphy of the Layered Gabbroic Dufek Intrusion, Antarctica (PDF), United States Geological Survey
- Management Plan for Antarctic Specially Protected Area (ASPA) No. 119 (PDF), ATCM, 2015
- This article incorporates public domain material from websites or documents of the United States Geological Survey.
