= List of Antarctic ice streams =

This is a list of Antarctic ice streams.

A complete list of Antarctic ice streams is not available. Names and locations of Antarctic ice features, including those listed below, can be found in the Scientific Committee on Antarctic Research, Gazetteer. Major Antarctic ice drainage systems are given by Rignot and Thomas (2002). These include the ice streams with the greatest flow, which are listed below.

- Alison Ice Stream
- Bailey Ice Stream
- Berg Ice Stream
- Bindschadler Ice Stream (Ice Stream D)
- Blackwall Ice Stream
- Byrd Glacier
- David Glacier
- Denman Glacier
- DeVicq Glacier
- Drewry Ice Stream
- Echelmeyer Ice Stream (Ice Stream F)
- Evans Ice Stream
- Ferrigno Ice Stream
- Foundation Ice Stream
- Fox Ice Stream
- Horlick Ice Stream
- Institute Ice Stream
- Jutulstraumen Glacier
- Kamb Ice Stream (Ice Stream C)
- Lambert Glacier
- Land Glacier
- Lidke Ice Stream
- MacAyeal Ice Stream (Ice Stream E)
- Mercer Ice Stream (Ice Stream A)
- Mertz Glacier
- Möller Ice Stream
- Mulock Glacier
- Ninnis Glacier
- Patuxent Ice Stream
- Pine Island Glacier
- Rayner Glacier
- Recovery Glacier
- Rutford Ice Stream
- Scott Glacier
- Shimizu Ice Stream
- Shirase Glacier
- Slessor Glacier
- Smith Glacier
- Support Force Glacier
- Stancomb-Wills Glacier
- Thwaites Glacier
- Totten Glacier
- Van der Veen Ice Stream (Ice Stream B1)
- Walcott North Stream
- Walcott South Stream
- Whillans Ice Stream (Ice Stream B)
- Wiesnet Ice Stream
- Williams Ice Stream
