= Engelhardt Ice Ridge =

Engelhardt Ice Ridge (83°20′S 146°0′W) is an ice ridge between Whillans Ice Stream and Kamb Ice Stream (formerly Ice Streams B and C) near the junction of Gould Coast and Siple Coast in Marie Byrd Land, Antarctica. It was named by the Advisory Committee on Antarctic Names after Hermann Engelhardt of the Division of Geological and Planetary Sciences, California Institute of Technology; he was a United States Antarctic Program geophysicist who drilled boreholes in Whillans and Kamb Ice Streams in four field seasons, 1991–96.
