= Mercer Ice Stream =

Antarctic ice stream

Mercer Ice Stream (84°50′S 145°00′W), formerly Ice Stream A, flows west to Gould Coast to the south of Whillans Ice Stream, Antarctica. It is the southernmost of several major ice streams draining from Marie Byrd Land into the Ross Ice Shelf. The ice streams were investigated and mapped by U.S. Antarctic Research Program personnel in a number of field seasons from 1983–84 and named Ice Stream A, B, C, etc., according to their position from south to north. The name was changed by the Advisory Committee on Antarctic Names in 2002 to honor Quaternary geologist John H. Mercer (1922–87) of the Institute of Polar Studies (now the Byrd Polar Research Center), Ohio State University, who mapped the moraines above Reedy Glacier and in the Ohio Range at the head of Horlick Ice Stream, the major tributaries to Mercer Ice Stream.

== See also ==
- Conway Ice Ridge
- List of glaciers in the Antarctic
- List of Antarctic ice streams
