= Rambo Nunataks =

- Location within Antarctica

Geography
- Continent: Antarctica
- Range coordinates: 83°57′S 66°20′W
- Parent range: Pensacola Mountains

Rambo Nunataks (83°57′S 66°20′W) is a loose chain of nunataks which lie northwest of Patuxent Range and extend along the west side of the Foundation Ice Stream for 17 nautical miles (31 km; 20 mi) in the Pensacola Mountains, Antarctica.

== Exploration and name ==
The Rambo Nunataks were mapped by United States Geological Survey (USGS) from surveys and United States Navy air photos, 1956–66. They were named by the United States Advisory Committee on Antarctic Names (US-ACAN) for William L. Rambo, geophysicist in the Pensacola Mountains, 1965–66.

== Location ==
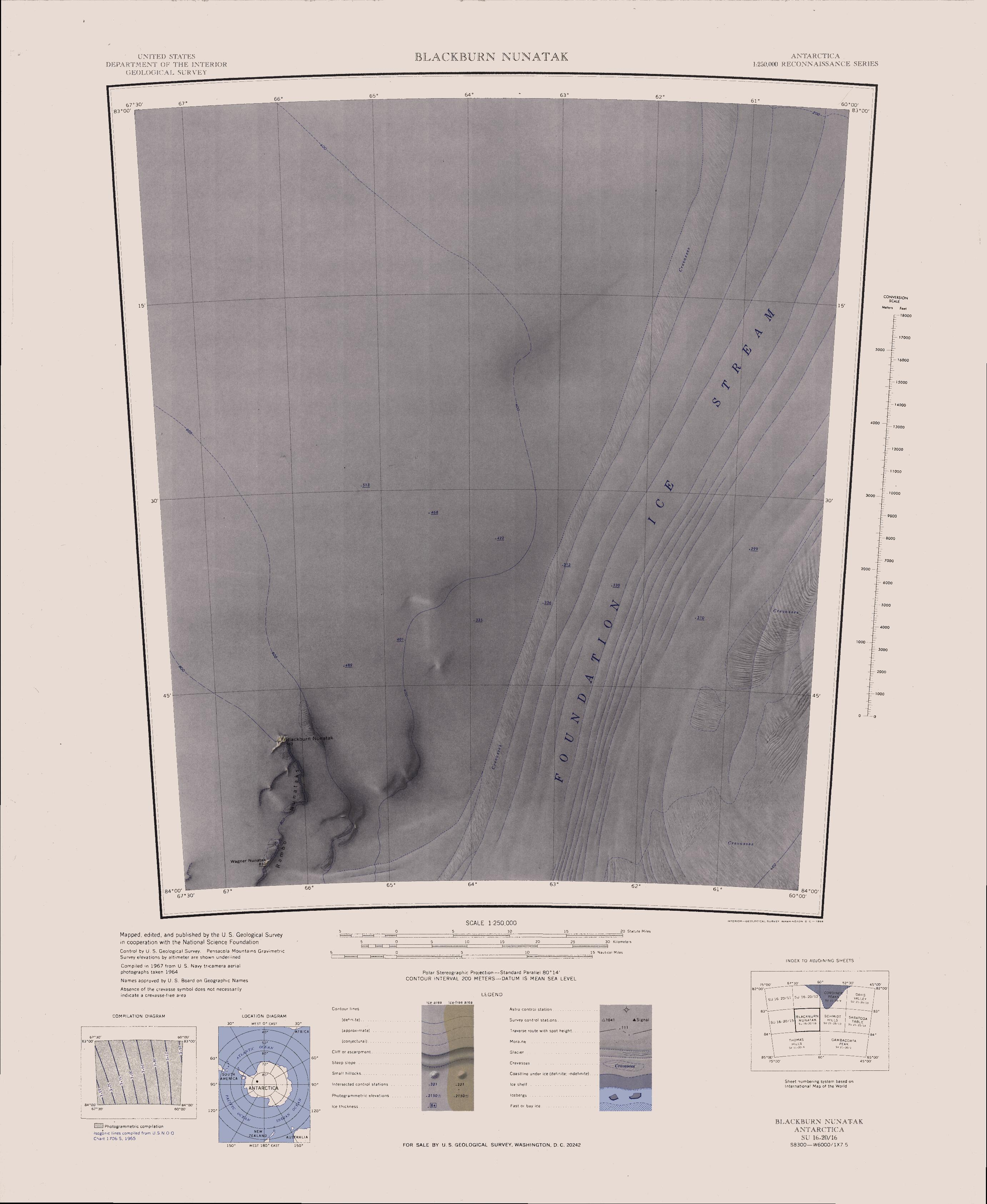
Northern Rambo Nunataks in southwest corner of map

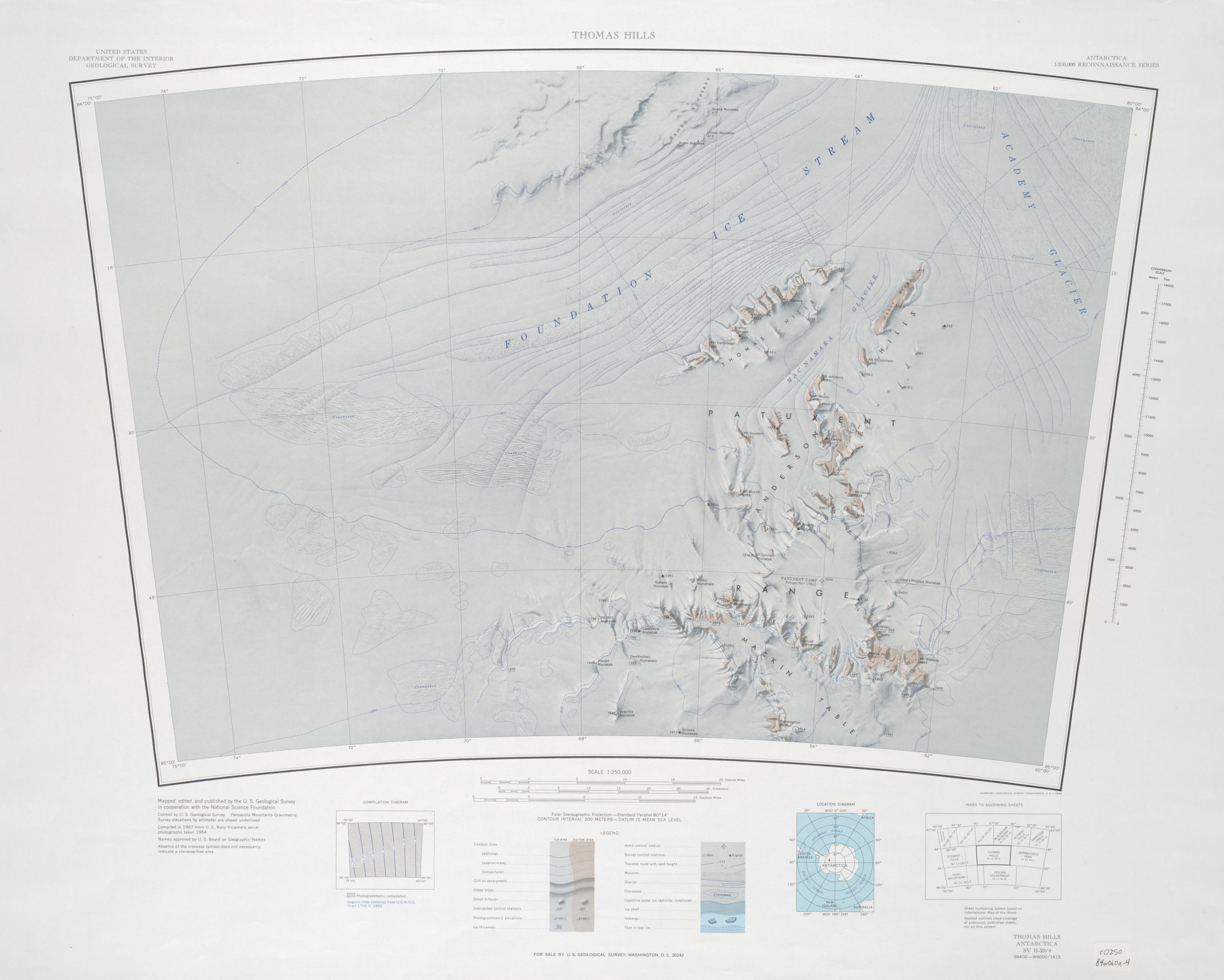
Southern Rambo Nunataks in north center of map

The Rambo Nunataks are on the northwest side of the Foundation Ice Stream, to the north of the Thomas Hills in the Patuxent Range. They separate the drainage basin of the Möller Ice Stream from the drainage basin of Foundation Ice Stream. From south to north they include Kuhn Nunatak, Oliver Nunatak, Sowle Nunatak, Wagner Nunatak and Blackburn Nunatak.

== Features ==
=== Kuhn Nunatak ===
84°06′S 66°34′W. One of the Rambo Nunataks, lying 3 nautical miles (5.6 km; 3.5 mi) southwest of Oliver Nunatak. Named by US-AC AN for Michael H. Kuhn, meteorologist at Plateau Station, winter 1967.

=== Oliver Nunatak ===
84°05′S 66°08′W. One of the Rambo Nunataks, lying 2 nautical miles (3.7 km; 2.3 mi) south of Sowle Nunatak. Named by US-ACAN for Thomas H. Oliver, electronics technician at Plateau Station, winter 1967.

=== Sowle Nunatak ===
83°03′S 66°05′W. One of the Rambo Nunataks, lying 5.5 nautical miles (10.2 km; 6.3 mi) southeast of Wagner Nunatak. Named by US-ACAN for Melvin L. Sowle, construction mechanic at Plateau Station, winter 1967.

=== Wagner Nunatak ===
83°58′S 66°30′W. One of the Rambo Nunataks, 850 metres (2,790 ft) high, standing 9 nautical miles (17 km; 10 mi) south of Blackburn Nunatak. Named by US-ACAN for John K. Wagner, radioscientist at Plateau Station, winter 1967.

=== Blackburn Nunatak ===
83°49′S 66°13′W. A prominent nunatak, 965 metres (3,166 ft) high, marking the north extremity of Rambo Nunataks. Named by US-ACAN for Lieutenant Archie B. Blackburn, (MC) United States Navy, officer in charge at Plateau Station, winter 1967.

== Sources ==
- Alberts, Fred G., ed. (1995), Geographic Names of the Antarctic (PDF) (2 ed.), United States Board on Geographic Names This article incorporates public domain material from websites or documents of the United States Board on Geographic Names.
- Blackburn Nunatak, USGS: United States Geological Survey
- Thomas Hills, USGS: United States Geological Survey
- This article incorporates public domain material from websites or documents of the United States Geological Survey.
