= MacAyeal Ice Stream =

Glaciological area in Marie Byrd Land, Antarctica

MacAyeal Ice Stream (80°S 143°W), formerly Ice Stream E, is an ice stream in Antarctica flowing west to the juncture of Shirase Coast and Siple Coast between Bindschadler Ice Stream and Echelmeyer Ice Stream. It is one of several major ice streams draining from Marie Byrd Land into the Ross Ice Shelf. The ice streams were investigated and mapped by U.S. Antarctic Research Program personnel in a number of field seasons from 1983 to 1984 onwards and named Ice Stream A, B, C, etc., according to their position from south to north. The name was changed from Ice Stream E by the Advisory Committee on Antarctic Names in 2002 to honor Douglas R. MacAyeal of the Department of Geophysical Sciences, University of Chicago, a U.S. Antarctic Program investigator in the Ross Sea area including study of the Ross Ice Shelf, the West Antarctic Ice Sheet and the Marie Byrd Land ice streams, 1989–2002. Shabtaie Ice Ridge sits between the MacAyeal and Bundschadler ice streams.

== See also ==
- List of glaciers in the Antarctic
- List of Antarctic ice streams
