= Echelmeyer Ice Stream =

Glaciological feature of the West Antarctic Ice Sheet

- Location within Antarctica
- Location: Oates Land
- Coordinates: 79°10′S 150°00′W
- Thickness: unknown
- Terminus: Ross Ice Shelf
- Status: unknown

The Echelmeyer Ice Stream (79°10′S 150°00′W), formerly known as Ice Stream F, is a glaciological feature of the West Antarctic Ice Sheet. It is an ice stream flowing west to the Shirase Coast to the north of the MacAyeal Ice Stream, and is one of several major ice streams draining from Marie Byrd Land into the Ross Ice Shelf. The ice streams were investigated and mapped by U.S. Antarctic Research Program personnel in a number of field seasons from 1983–84 and originally named Ice Stream A, B, C, etc., according to their position from south to north.

The name was changed from Ice Stream F by the Advisory Committee on Antarctic Names in 2002 to honor Dr. Keith A. Echelmeyer of the Geophysical Institute, University of Alaska, Fairbanks, who studied the flow of Marie Byrd Land ice streams, 1992–93 and 1994–95, as well as the fast flow of surging glaciers in Alaska and Greenland. Dr. Echelmeyer was a student of Barclay Kamb for whom Kamb Ice Stream is named.

== See also ==
- List of glaciers in the Antarctic
- Glaciology
