= Shabtaie Ice Ridge =

Mountain in the arctic

Shabtaie Ice Ridge (80°30′S 140°0′W) is an ice ridge between MacAyeal Ice Stream and Bindschadler Ice Stream at the junction of Shirase Coast and Siple Coast, Marie Byrd Land. Named by Advisory Committee on Antarctic Names (US-ACAN) after Sion Shabtaie, Geophysical and Polar Research Center, University of Wisconsin, Madison, WI, who, with Charles R. Bentley, 1982–84 and 1985–86, made a glaciogeophysical survey of the nearby Mercer, Whillans and Kamb Ice Streams (formerly Ice Streams A, B and C) and the intervening ice ridges.
