= Möller Ice Stream =

Ice stream

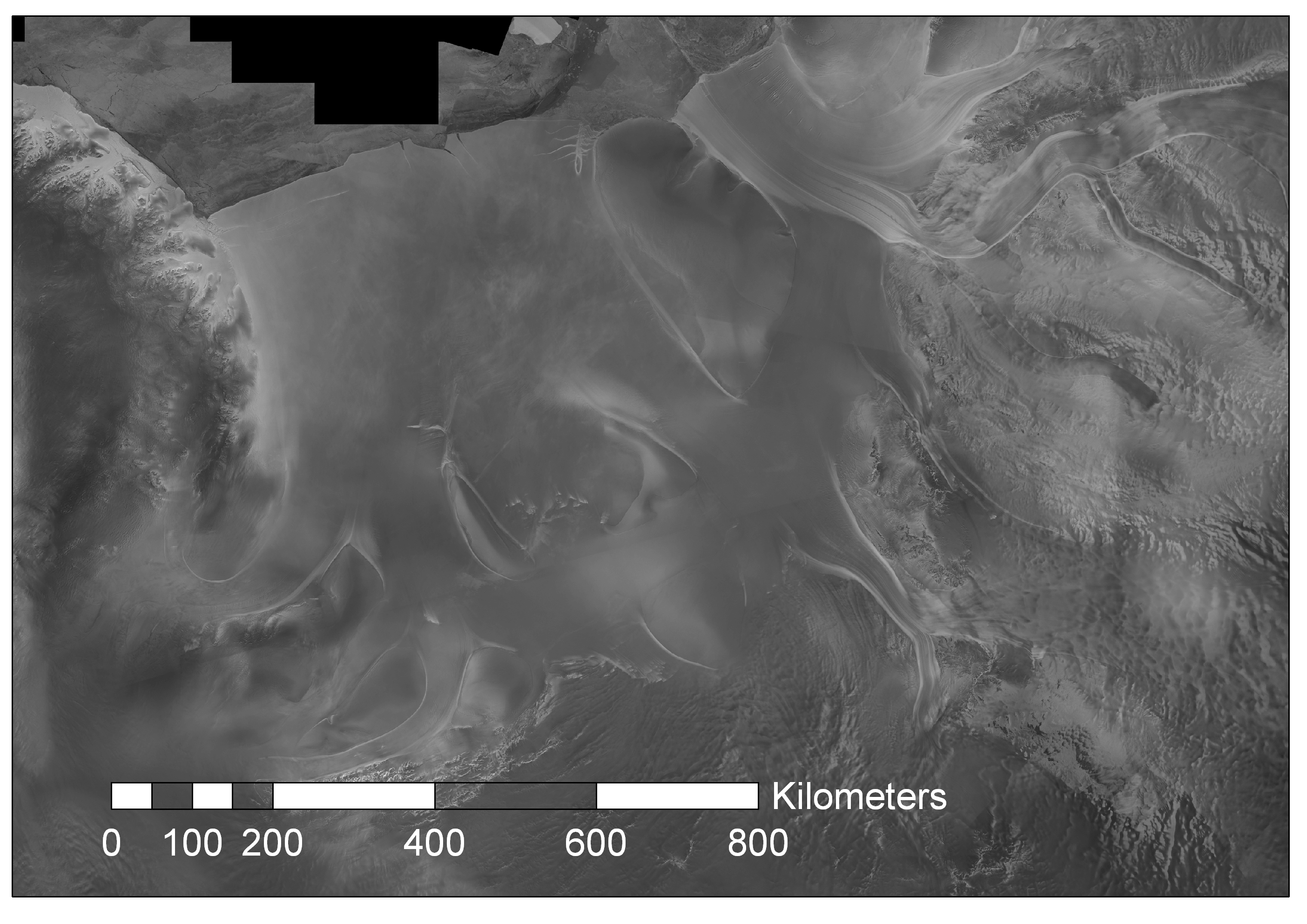
Radarsat image of ice streams, including the Möller, flowing into the Filchner-Ronne Ice Shelf

Möller Ice Stream (82°20′S 63°30′W) is an Antarctic ice stream that drains an area of 66,000 square kilometres (25,000 sq mi) of the West Antarctic Ice Sheet as it flows north-northeast into the Ronne Ice Shelf to the west of Foundation Ice Stream. The drainage basin of this ice stream is separated by the Rambo Nunataks from the drainage basin of Foundation Ice Stream.

The feature was delineated from U.S. Landsat imagery commissioned by the Institut für Angewandte Geodäsie, Frankfurt am Main, Germany, recorded January–March, 1986. It was named after German engineer Professor Dietrich Möller, Director of the Institute for Land Survey at the Technical University of Braunschweig from 1972, and Deputy Leader and in charge of geodetic work at Filchner Station on the Ronne Ice Shelf in 1979–80.

== See also ==
- List of glaciers in the Antarctic
- List of Antarctic ice streams
