= Snake Ridge =

- Location within Antarctica

Highest point
- Coordinates: 84°49′S 66°30′W

Geography
- Continent: Antarctica

Snake Ridge (84°49′S 66°30′W) is a serpentine ridge, 4 nautical miles (7.4 km; 4.6 mi) long, adjoining the northwest extremity of Mackin Table in the Patuxent Range, Pensacola Mountains.

== Exploration and name ==
Snake Ridge was mapped by United States Geological Survey (USGS) from surveys and United States Navy air photos in 1956–66. The descriptive name was proposed by Dwight L. Schmidt, USGS geologist to these mountains, 1962–66.

== Location ==
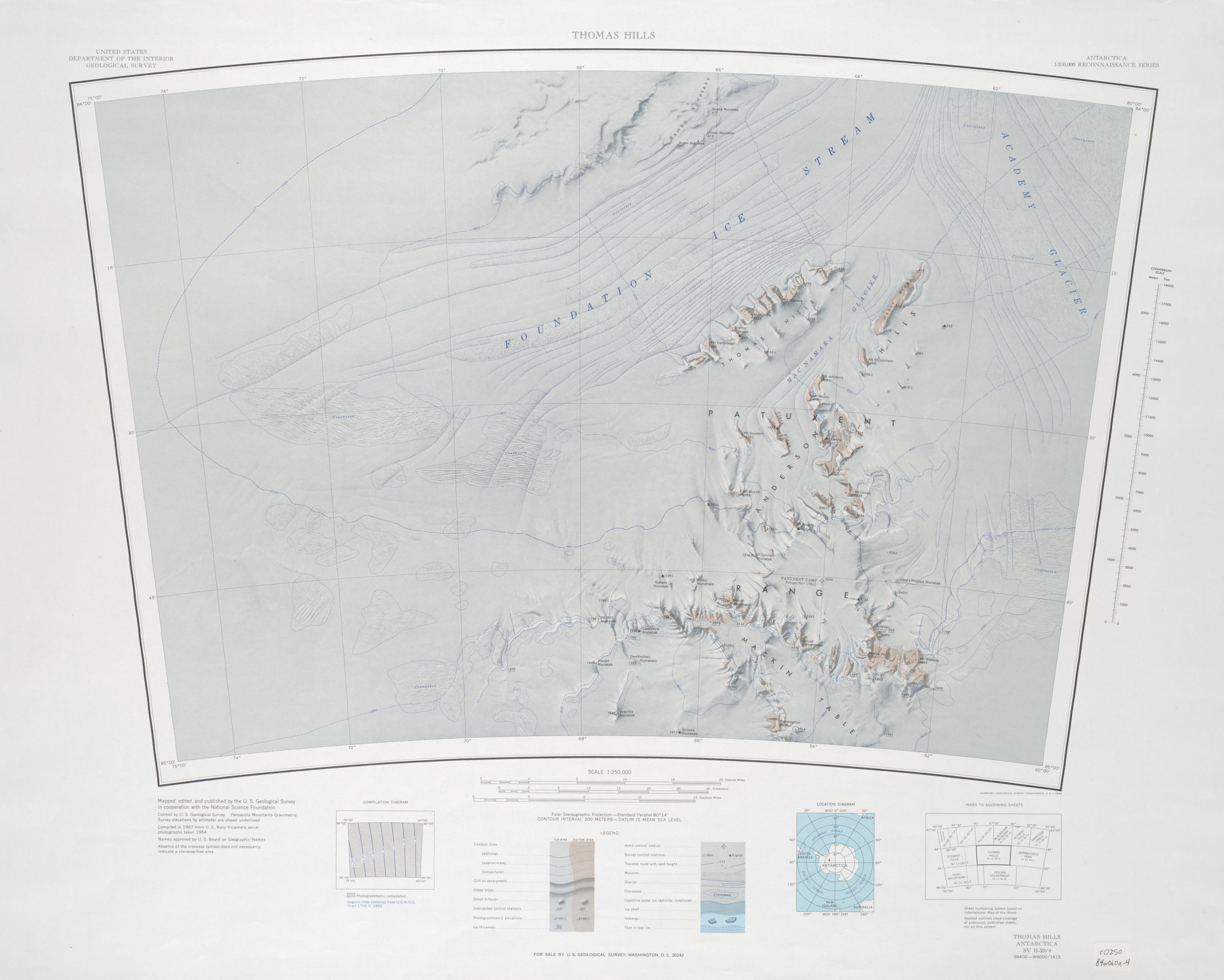
Snake Ridge to east of center

Snake Ridge is just west of the northwest end of Mackin Table, to the east of Mount Weininger. A number of nunataks are scattered in the ice-covered terrain to the south, west and north, including Brooks Nunatak, Brazitis Nunatak, Postel Nunatak, DesRoches Nunataks, DeWitt Nunatak, Lawrence Nunatak, Natani Nunatak and White Nunataks.

== Nearby features ==
=== Brooks Nunatak ===
84°59′S 66°18′W. An isolated nunatak, 1,615 metres (5,299 ft) high, standing 6 nautical miles (11 km; 6.9 mi) southwest of Shurley Ridge on the south side of Mackin Table. Mapped by USGS from surveys and United States Navy air photos, 1956-66. Named by the United States Advisory Committee on Antarctic Names (US-ACAN) for Robert E. Brooks, biologist at South Pole Station, summer 1966-67.

=== Brazitis Nunatak ===
84°58′S 67°23′W. A nunatak, 1,625 metres (5,331 ft) high, along the edge of an ice escarpment 5 nautical miles (9.3 km; 5.8 mi) south of DesRoches Nunataks. Mapped by USGS from surveys and United States Navy air photos, 1956-66. Named by US-ACAN for Peter F. Brazitis, cosmic ray scientist at South Pole Station, winter 1967.

=== Postel Nunatak ===
84°53′S 67°46′W. A nunatak, 1,450 metres (4,760 ft) high, standing 8 nautical miles (15 km; 9.2 mi) southwest of Snake Ridge along the ice escarpment that trends southwest from the ridge. Mapped by USGS from surveys and United States Navy air photos, 1956-66. Named by US-ACAN for Philip A. Postel, meteorologist at South Pole Station, winter 1967.

=== DesRoches Nunataks ===
84°53′S 67°08′W. Two nunataks standing 3 nautical miles (5.6 km; 3.5 mi) east of Postel Nunatak. Mapped by USGS from surveys and United States Navy air photos, 1956-66. Named by US-ACAN for Joseph DesRoches, meteorologist at South Pole Station, winter 1967.

=== DeWitt Nunatak ===
84°49′S 67°42′W. A nunatak, 1,295 metres (4,249 ft) high, along the face of an ice escarpment 7 nautical miles (13 km; 8.1 mi) west of Snake Ridge. Mapped by USGS from surveys and United States Navy air photos, 1956-66. Named by US-ACAN for Steven R. DeWitt, meteorologist at Palmer Station, winter 1966.

=== Lawrence Nunatak ===
84°50′S 67°02′W. A nunatak, 1,540 metres (5,050 ft) high, standing 3 nautical miles (5.6 km; 3.5 mi) west of Snake Ridge along the ice escarpment that trends southwest from the ridge. Mapped by USGS from surveys and United States Navy air photos, 1956-66. Named by US-ACAN for Lawrence E. Brown, surveyor at Palmer Station, winter 1966.

=== Natani Nunatak ===
84°46′S 66°32′W. A nunatak 1.5 nautical miles (2.8 km; 1.7 mi) north-northeast of the extremity of Snake Ridge. Mapped by USGS from surveys and United States Navy air photos, 1956-66. Named by US-ACAN for Kirmach Natani, biologist at South Pole Station, winter 1967.

=== White Nunataks ===
84°46′S 66°05′W. Three nunataks standing 3 nautical miles (5.6 km; 3.5 mi) north of the northwest tip of Mackin Table. Mapped by USGS from surveys and United States Navy air photos, 1959-66. Named by US-ACAN for Noah D. White, radioman at South Pole Station, winter 1967.

== Sources ==
- Alberts, Fred G., ed. (1995), Geographic Names of the Antarctic (PDF) (2 ed.), United States Board on Geographic Names This article incorporates public domain material from websites or documents of the United States Board on Geographic Names.
- Thomas Hills, USGS: United States Geological Survey
- This article incorporates public domain material from websites or documents of the United States Geological Survey.
