= USS Wyandot =

Cargo ship of the United States Navy

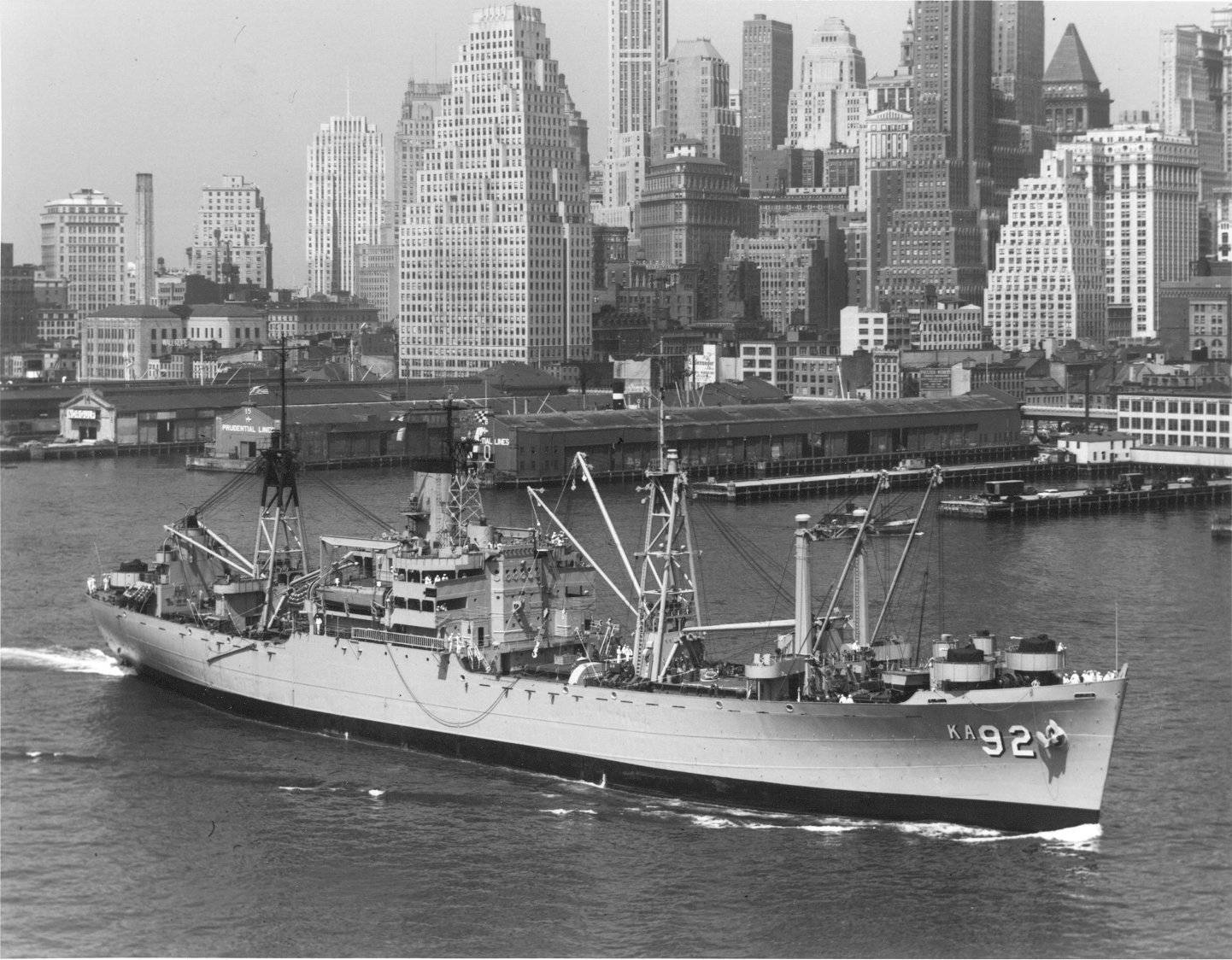
- USS Wyandot (AKA-92)

History

United States
- Name: USS Wyandot
- Namesake: Wyandot County, Ohio
- Builder: Moore Dry Dock Company, Oakland, California
- Laid down: 6 May 1944
- Launched: 28 June 1944
- Commissioned: 30 September 1944
- Decommissioned: 10 July 1959
- Recommissioned: November 1961
- Decommissioned: 31 October 1975
- Reclassified: T-AKA-92, March 1963
- Honours and awards: 1 battle star (World War II)
- Fate: Sold for scrap, 5 November 1987

General characteristics
- Class & type: Andromeda-class attack cargo ship
- Type: Type C2-S-B1
- Displacement: 13,910 long tons (14,133 t) full
- Length: 459 ft 2 in (139.95 m)
- Beam: 63 ft (19 m)
- Draft: 26 ft 4 in (8.03 m)
- Speed: 18.6 knots (34.4 km/h; 21.4 mph)
- Complement: 368
- Armament: 1 × 5"/38 caliber gun mount; 4 × twin 40 mm gun mounts; 16 × 20 mm gun mounts

USS Wyandot (AKA-92) was an Andromeda-class attack cargo ship named after Wyandot County, Ohio. She served as a commissioned ship for 20 years and 1 month.

Wyandot (AKA-92) was laid down on 6 May 1944 under a Maritime Commission contract (MC hull 1192) at Oakland, California, by the Moore Dry Dock Co.; launched on 28 June 1944, acquired by the Navy and simultaneously commissioned on 30 September 1944.

== Wartime service ==
Following her shakedown, Wyandot departed San Francisco on 25 November 1944, bound for the Hawaiian Islands. She made port at Pearl Harbor on 2 December and, after loading cargo earmarked for the Marshalls and Marianas, headed for Eniwetok and Guam. After delivering her cargo to those western Pacific bases, the attack cargo ship returned to the Hawaiian Islands.

Wyandot departed Pearl Harbor on 26 January 1945 and proceeded thence via Eniwetok to Tacloban where she joined the forces massing for the assault on Okinawa. Assigned to a support role with the amphibious forces, Wyandot — partially unloaded — was returning from a night retirement alert about 0400 on 29 March when a Japanese horizontal bomber, probably on a night heckler mission, came in off Wyandot's starboard quarter and dropped a pair of bombs, one of which hit close aboard the ship's starboard quarter, sprinkling her stern with what appeared to be picric acid.

The second bomb plunged into the water near the attack cargo ship's starboard side and scored an underwater hit, making two large cracks in her hull. The two forward holds and the forward magazine flooded quickly, and Wyandot listed slightly to starboard. Putting the remainder of her landing craft and boats in the water, the vessel painfully made her way to an advanced repair base, down by the bow and steaming slowly, but still afloat.

Within a short time, the ship's force, aided by the salvage experts of the repair unit, had made the necessary temporary repairs; Wyandot consequently returned to her place off the beaches of Okinawa and continued discharging ammunition, vehicles, gasoline, provisions, and special equipment earmarked for the American 10th Army on Okinawa.

Wyandot, her mission at Okinawa completed, sailed for the west coast of the United States, via Pearl Harbor, for permanent repairs and reached the Naval Dry Docks at Terminal Island, San Pedro, California, on 6 June. After brief periods at San Diego, and later San Francisco, Wyandot headed for Pearl Harbor once more—but too late to participate in any further combat operations. She arrived at Pearl Harbor on 28 August.

Wyandot subsequently visited the Far East that autumn, departing Pearl Harbor on 7 October and visiting, in succession, Okinawa; Tientsin, China; Guam; Eniwetok; and Kwajalein before returning to Pearl Harbor on 27 November. The next day, the cargo ship got underway for the Atlantic; steamed via the Panama Canal; and arrived at Norfolk, Virginia, on 19 December.

== Post-war service ==
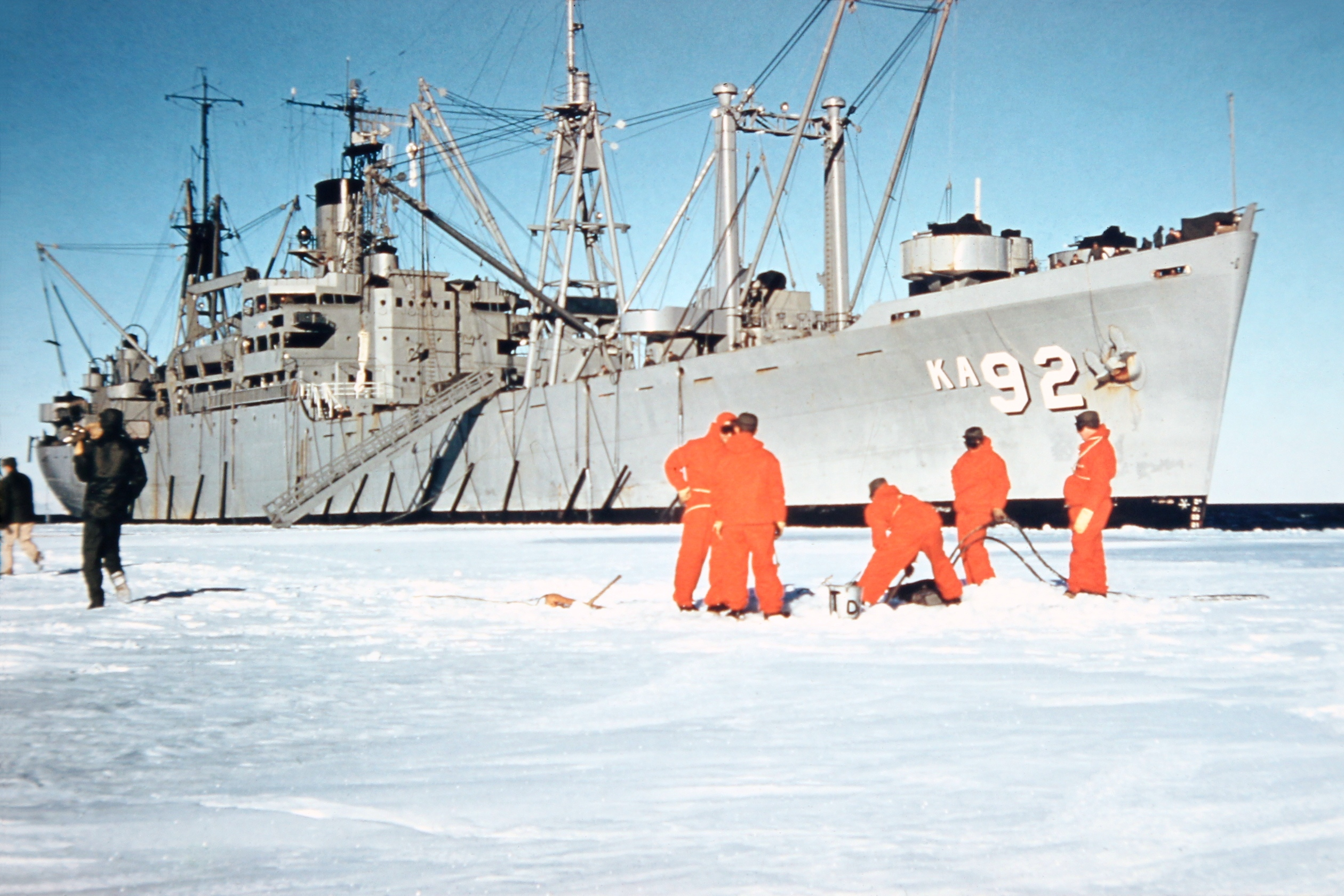
Wyandot mooring at McMurdo Station, Antarctica (Dec 1955)

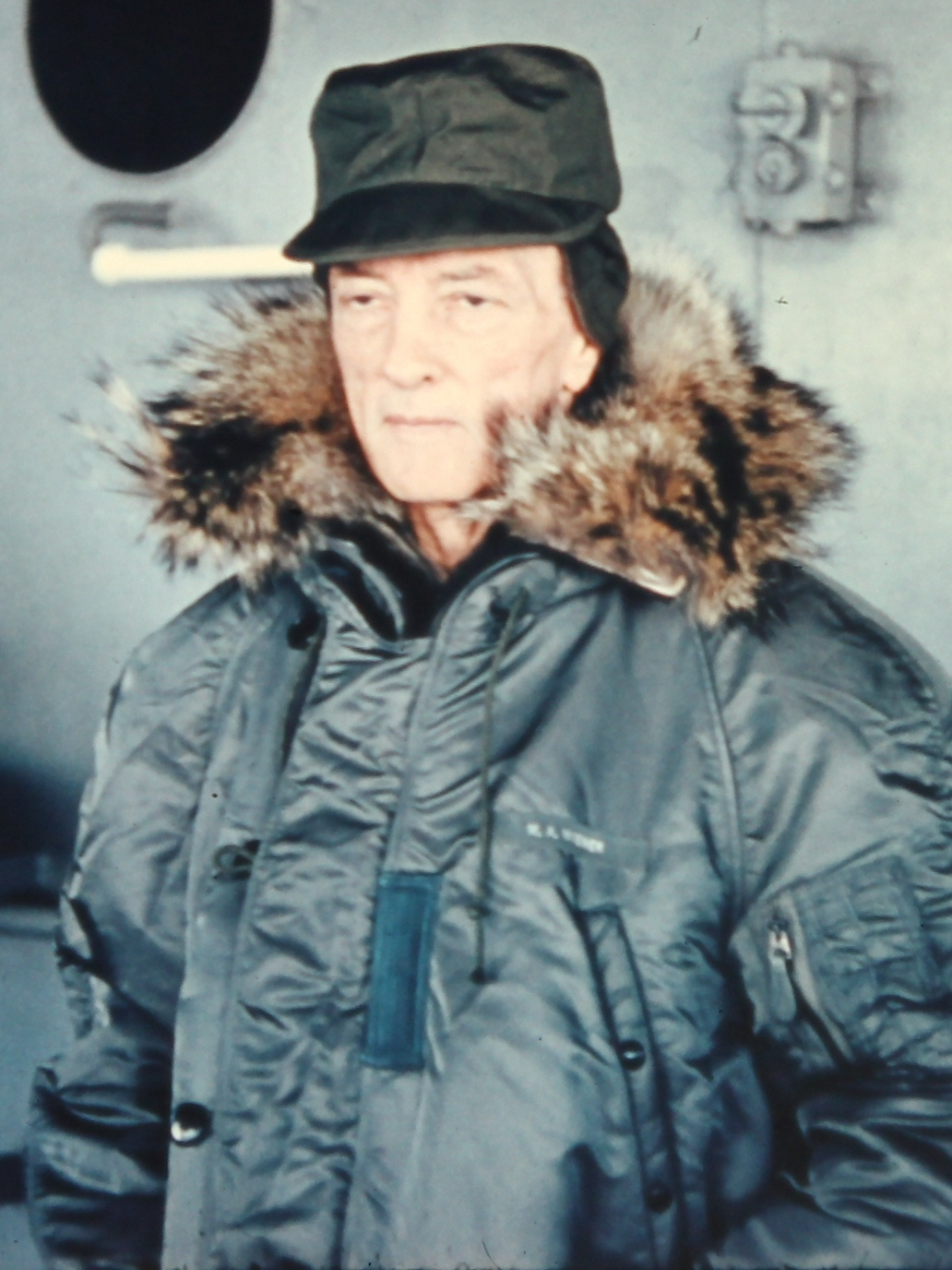
Admiral Richard Byrd on board Wyandot (Dec 1955)

Wyandot operated out of Norfolk for the next two years. Early in 1947, she departed the Hampton Roads area and took part in the 1947 Atlantic Fleet exercises—maneuvers that took the ship as far as Trinidad in the British West Indies. Departing Trinidad on 8 March, the attack cargo ship took part in further exercises before she made a transatlantic passage to Casablanca, French Morocco. Staying at Casablanca from 24 March to 30 March, Wyandot returned via New Orleans to Norfolk on 30 April.

Again operating off the eastern seaboard early that summer, Wyandot subsequently headed for her first deployment in Arctic waters, departing Boston on 16 July 1947 for Thule, Greenland, and Devon and Cornwallis islands. Returning to Boston on 25 September, Wyandot spent the next year operating along the eastern seaboard and gulf coast of the United States, as well as making two cruises to the Caribbean and one to Panama.

On 16 July 1948, Wyandot departed Boston, visiting the Arctic again as part of the Navy's annual cold-weather exercises in those climes. She revisited the bases she had called upon the previous year and returned to Boston on 18 September, en route to Norfolk.

Over the next two years, Wyandot operated out of Norfolk and made her first Mediterranean deployment, visiting ports in Italy and French Morocco; the island of Crete; Great Britain; Cuba; Puerto Rico; the Virgin Islands; Haiti; Newfoundland; Bermuda; Nova Scotia; the Panama Canal Zone; and Curaçao, Netherlands West Indies.

Early in 1951, Wyandot was selected to participate in Operation Blue Jay, transporting construction materials to the northern part of Greenland—and was busy in that mission from May to September of that year. She returned to that area in 1952 as part of Operation "SuNAC" (Supply Northern Atlantic Construction). The following year, Wyandot conducted logistical support missions in the Caribbean and later participated in the joint United States and Canadian resupply operations with Arctic weather stations. Wyandot again deployed to the Mediterranean and Caribbean areas between 1953 and 1955, winning the coveted Battle Efficiency Award for 1955.

In the spring of 1955, Wyandot joined Task Force 43 for "Operation Deep Freeze I" in the Antarctic. After a brief yard availability, the ship loaded supplies and equipment at Davisville, Rhode Island, and shifted to Norfolk, from whence she departed on 14 November. Sailing via the Panama Canal and Lyttelton, New Zealand, Wyandot arrived at McMurdo Sound, Antarctica, on 27 December. While in those cold southern latitudes, she served as the flagship for Rear Admiral Richard E. Byrd, officer-in-charge of the Antarctic programs.

She was then assigned to "Operation Deep Freeze II" in 1956. Wyandot rendezvoused with Staten Island (AGB-5) near the Panama Canal Zone before both continued on for Antarctica, arriving on 15 December at the Weddell Sea pack ice and then breaking through the Antarctic Circle on 20 December en route to Cape Adams. In 1957 Staten Island led Wyandot from Cape Adams to Gould Bay where Ellsworth Station was then assembled. Subsequently, the Wyandot returned home and operated with the Atlantic Fleet into the late 1950s.

== Recommissioned in Transportation Service ==
Wyandot was decommissioned on 10 July 1959 and struck from the Navy List. On 1 July 1960, however, the ship was reinstated on the list because of the increased east-west tensions over the crisis situation in Berlin.

Recommissioned in November 1961, Wyandot was transferred to the Military Sea Transportation Service (MSTS) in March 1963 and reclassified as T-AKA-92. Later reclassified as T-AK-283, Wyandot served with MSTS, Atlantic, through the 1960s and was shifted to MSTS' successor organization, the Military Sealift Command (MSC) by October 1973, and to MSC, Pacific, by 1 July 1974.

== Decommissioning and sale ==
On 31 October 1975, Wyandot was placed in the United States Maritime Administration Reserve Fleet. She was sold for scrap on 5 November 1987 to Nissho Iwai Corp. of Japan and scrapped in Taiwan.

== Awards ==
Wyandot (AKA-92) was awarded one battle star for her World War II service.
