= Bindschadler Ice Stream =

Ice streams of Marie Byrd Land

- Location within Antarctica
- Location: Marie Byrd Land
- Coordinates: 81°00′S 142°00′W
- Thickness: unknown
- Terminus: Ross Ice Shelf
- Status: unknown

Bindschadler Ice Stream (81°00′S 142°00′W) is an ice stream between Siple Dome and MacAyeal Ice Stream. It is one of several major ice streams draining from Marie Byrd Land into the Ross Ice Shelf. The ice streams were investigated and mapped by U.S. Antarctic Research Program personnel in a number of field seasons from 1983 to 1984 and named Ice Stream A, B, C, etc., according to their position from south to north.

The name of this ice stream was changed from Ice Stream D by the Advisory Committee on Antarctic Names (ACAN) in 2001 or 2002 to honor Robert A. Bindschadler of the NASA Goddard Space Flight Center, a U.S. Antarctic Project investigator of the West Antarctic Ice Sheet including the dynamics of the Marie Byrd Land ice streams and their interaction with the Ross Ice Shelf, from about 1983 to 1998. In January 2003 the United States Board on Geographic Names accepted this recommendation, revising its 2000 decision; the geographic coordinates were also updated.

Shabtaie Ice Ridge sits between the MacAyeal and Bundschadler ice streams.

== See also ==
- List of glaciers in the Antarctic
- List of Antarctic ice streams
- Glaciology

== Sources ==
- Antarctic Glaciologists Honored by ACAN
