= Patuxent Range =

Mountains in Antarctica

- Location within Antarctica

Highest point
- Coordinates: 84°43′S 64°30′W

Geography
- Parent range: Pensacola Mountains

The Patuxent Range (84°43′S 64°30′W) is a major range of the Pensacola Mountains, Antarctica. It comprises the Thomas Hills, Anderson Hills, Mackin Table and various nunataks and ridges bounded by the Foundation Ice Stream, Academy Glacier and the Patuxent Ice Stream.

== Exploration and name ==
The Patuxent Range was discovered and partially photographed on January 13, 1956 in the course of a transcontinental nonstop plane flight by personnel of U.S. Navy Operation Deep Freeze I from McMurdo Sound to Weddell Sea and return. It was named by Advisory Committee on Antarctic Names (US-ACAN) for the Naval Air Station Patuxent River (at Cedar Point, Maryland) located on the south side of the mouth of the Patuxent River. The range was mapped in detail by USGS from surveys and U.S. Navy air photos, 1956-66.

== Location ==
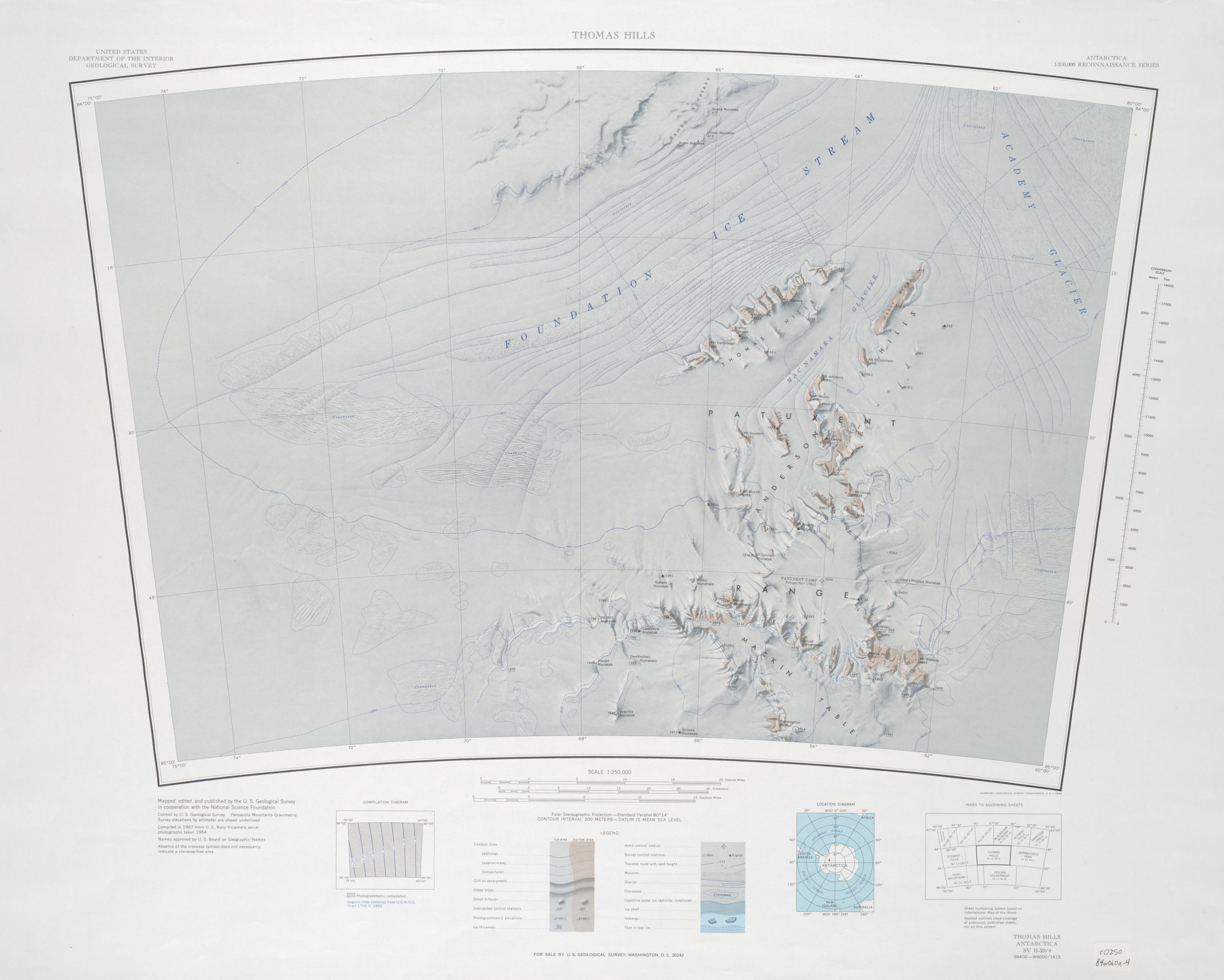
Patuxent Range in center of map

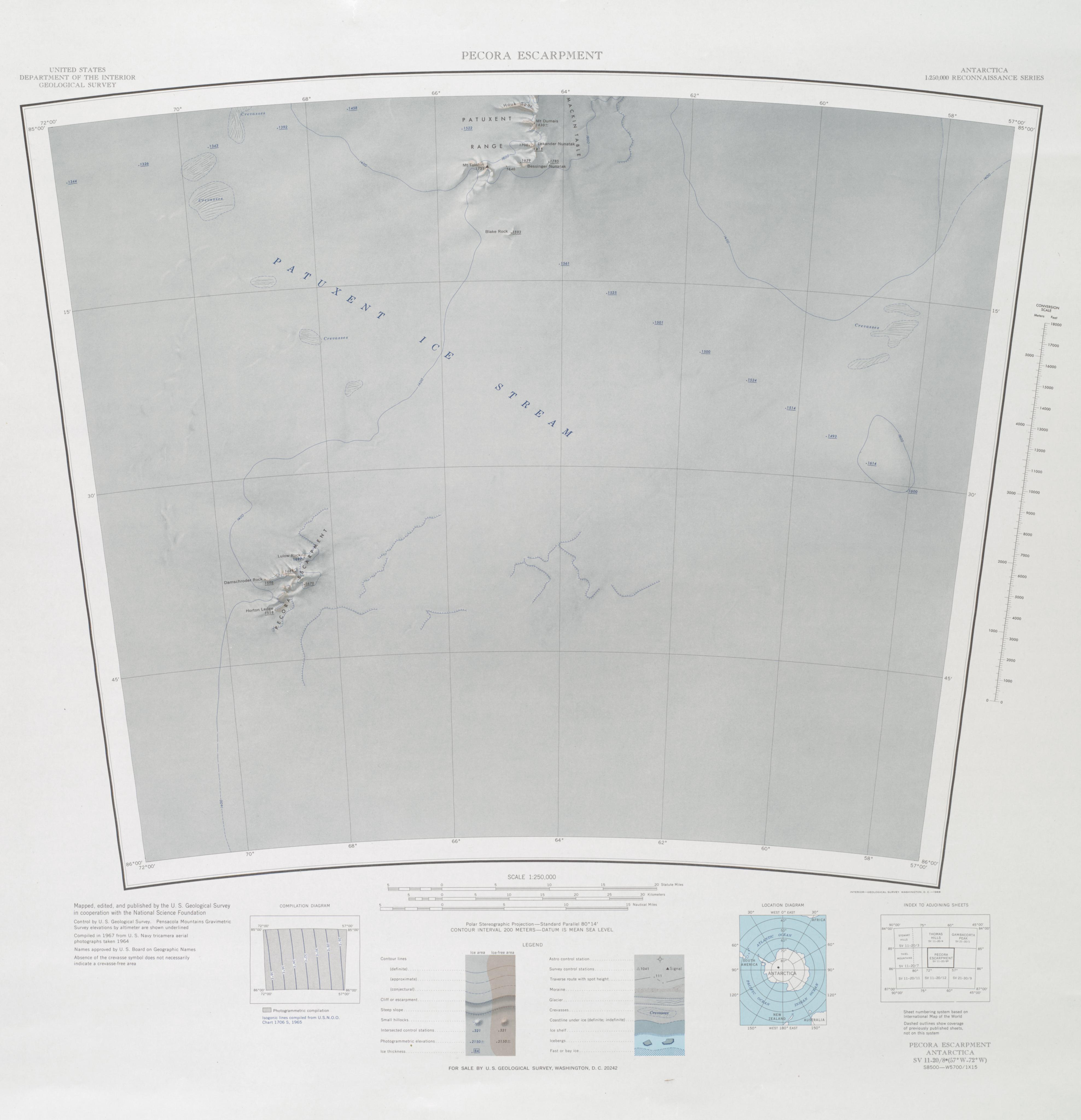
South tip of Patuxent Range in north center of map

The Putuxent Range lies to the south of the Foundation Ice Stream, west of the Academy Glacier and northeast of the Patuxent Ice Stream. In the north, the Thomas Hills run along the south side of the Foundation Ice Stream. The MacNamara Glacier to their south separates them from the Anderson Hills. In the southwest, Snake Ridge is at the center of a scattered group of nunataks. Mackin Table is in the southeast.

== Glaciers ==
- Foundation Ice Stream (83°15′S 60°00′W), a major ice stream in the Pensacola Mountains of Antarctica. The ice stream drains northward for 150 nautical miles (280 km; 170 mi) along the west side of the Patuxent Range and the Neptune Range to enter the Ronne Ice Shelf westward of Dufek Massif.
- Academy Glacier (84°15′S 61°00′W), a major glacier in the Pensacola Mountains, draining northwestward between the Patuxent and Neptune Ranges to enter Foundation Ice Stream.
- Patuxent Ice Stream [85°15′S 67°45′W), a broad ice stream between Patuxent Range and Pecora Escarpment in the Pensacola Mountains, draining northwestward to the upper part of Foundation Ice Stream.

== Features ==
Geographical features that contain or are the focus of groups of lesser features include:

- Thomas Hills (84°21′S 65°12′W), a linear group of hills, 17 nautical miles (31 km; 20 mi) long, between Foundation Ice Stream and MacNamara Glacier at the north end of the Patuxent Range.
- Anderson Hills (84°30′S 64°0′W), an irregular group of hills, ridges and peaks between Mackin Table and the Thomas Hills in the Patuxent Range.
- Snake Ridge (84°49′S 66°30′W), a serpentine ridge, 4 nautical miles (7.4 km; 4.6 mi) long, adjoining the northwest extremity of Mackin Table in the Patuxent Range.
- Mackin Table (84°57′S 64°0′W), an ice-topped, wedge-shaped plateau, about 20 nautical miles (37 km; 23 mi) long, standing just north of Patuxent Ice Stream in the Patuxent Range.

== Sources ==
- Alberts, Fred G., ed. (1995), Geographic Names of the Antarctic (PDF) (2 ed.), United States Board on Geographic Names This article incorporates public domain material from websites or documents of the United States Board on Geographic Names.
- Thomas Hills, USGS
- This article incorporates public domain material from websites or documents of the United States Geological Survey.
