= Conway Ice Ridge =

Ice ridge in Antarctica

Coordinates: 84°25′S 140°0′W

Conway Ice Ridge is an ice ridge between Whillans Ice Stream and Mercer Ice Stream on the Gould Coast, Marie Byrd Land. It was named by the Advisory Committee on Antarctic Names after Howard B. Conway of the Department of Geophysics at the University of Washington, Seattle. He was United States Antarctic Program geophysicist at Siple Dome, 1994–95 and at Meserve Glacier, 1995–96, and team leader in glacial history study of this ice ridge, 2001–02.
