= Anderson Hills =

Group of hills, ridges and peaks in Antarctica

- Location within Antarctica

Geography
- Continent: Antarctica
- Range coordinates: 84°30′S 64°0′W

The Anderson Hills (84°30′S 64°0′W) are an irregular group of hills, ridges and peaks between Mackin Table and the Thomas Hills in the Patuxent Range, Pensacola Mountains, Antarctica.

== Exploration and name ==
The Anderson Hills were mapped by the United States Geological Survey (USGS) from surveys and from United States Navy air photos, 1956–66. The hills were named by the United States Advisory Committee on Antarctic Names (US-ACAN) at the suggestion of Captain Finn Ronne, United States Navy Reserve, leader at Ellsworth Station, 1957. As United States Deputy Secretary of Defense, 1954–55, Robert B. Anderson had responsibilities for U.S. operations in Antarctica.

== Location ==
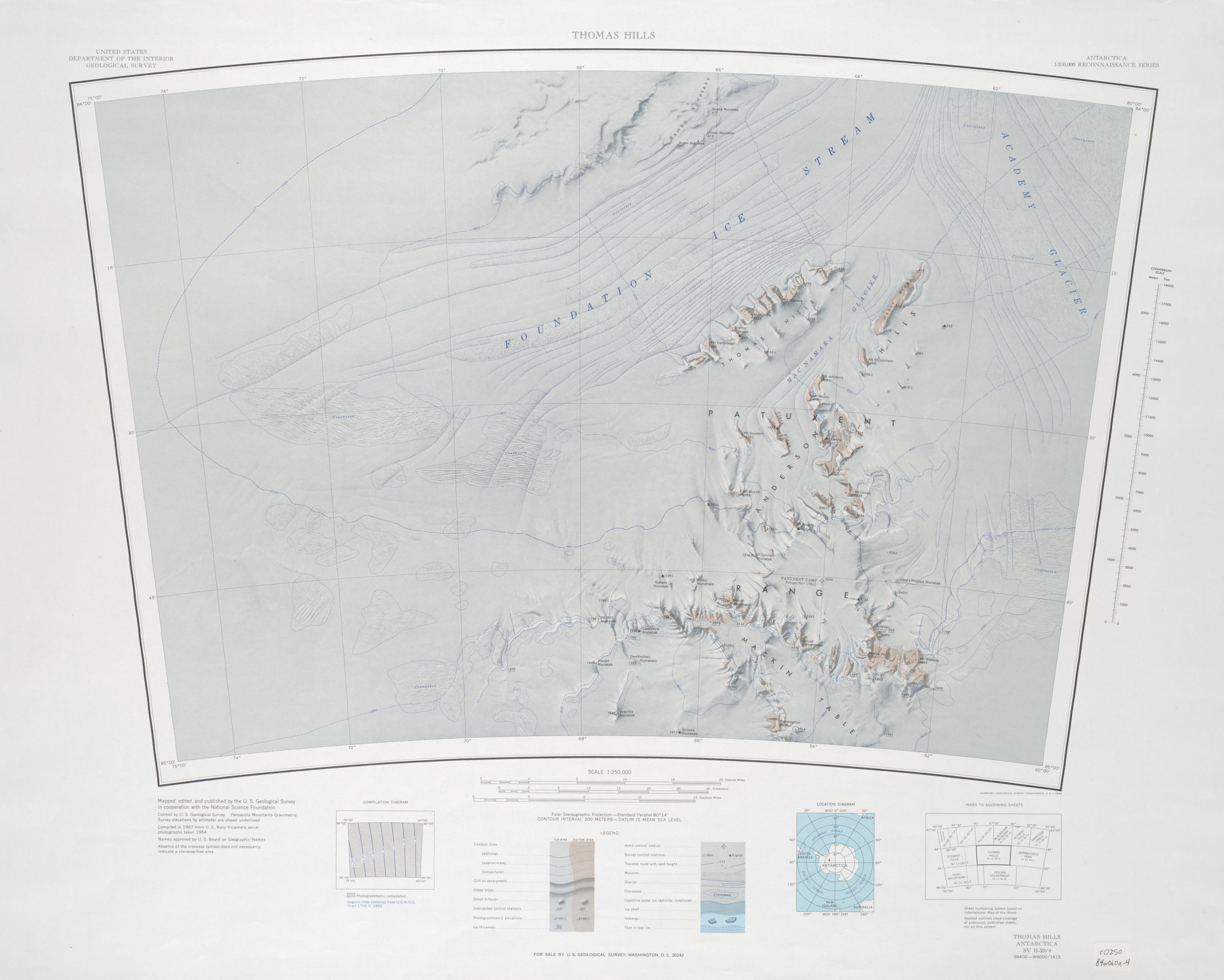
Anderson Hills to east of center

The Anderson Hills run from the center towards the north of the Patuxent Range. They run from southwest to northeast to the south of the MacNamara Glacier, which separates them from the Thomas Hills. The Mackin Table is to their south. Features, from southwest to northeast, include O'Connell Nunatak, Mount Murch, Mount Suydam, Clark Ridge, Mount Woods, King Ridge, Mount Cross, Wrigley Bluffs, Mount Lowry, Mount Bruns, Mount Whillans, Mount Stroschein and Weber Ridge.

== Features ==
Geographical features include, from southwest to northeast:

=== O'Connell Nunatak ===
84°43′S 65°08′W. A peaked rock nunatak, 1,210 metres (3,970 ft) high, standing 6 nautical miles (11 km; 6.9 mi) south-southeast of Mount Murch in southern Anderson Hills. Named by US-ACAN for Richard V. O'Connell, seismologist at South Pole Station, winter 1967.

=== Mount Murch ===
84°38′S 65°25′W. A small mountain, 1,100 metres (3,600 ft) high, standing 5 nautical miles (9.3 km; 5.8 mi) south of Mount Suydam. Named by US-ACAN for Paul L. Murch, cook at Palmer Station, winter 1966.

=== Mount Suydam ===
84°32′S 65°27′W. A mountain, 1,020 metres (3,350 ft) high, standing 3 nautical miles (5.6 km; 3.5 mi) west of Clark Ridge. Named by US-ACAN for E. Lynn Suydam, biologist at Palmer Station, winter 1967.

=== Clark Ridge ===
84°32′S 64°50′W. A prominent rock ridge, 4 nautical miles (7.4 km; 4.6 mi) long, located 4 nautical miles (7.4 km; 4.6 mi) west of Mount Lowry. Named by US-ACAN for Larry Clark, cook at Plateau Station, winter 1967.

=== Mount Woods ===
84°40′S 64°30′W. A bare, ridge-like mountain, 1,170 metres (3,840 ft) high, standing 4.5 nautical miles (8.3 km; 5.2 mi) northeast of O'Connell Nunatak. Named by US-ACAN for Clifford R. Woods, Jr., hospital corpsman at Palmer Station, winter 1967.

=== King Ridge ===
84°38′S 64°05′W. A narrow rock ridge, 3 nautical miles (5.6 km; 3.5 mi) long, lying2 nautical miles (3.7 km; 2.3 mi) southwest of Wrigley Bluffs. Named by US-ACAN at the suggestion of Captain Finn Ronne, United States Navy Reserve, leader at Ellsworth Station, 1957. Colonel J. Caldwell King, United States Army, had assisted Ronne in obtaining support for the RARE, 1947–8.

=== Mount Cross ===
84°37′S 63°38′W. A mountain, 1,005 metres (3,297 ft) high, standing 2.5 nautical miles (4.6 km; 2.9 mi) northeast of King Ridge. Named by US-ACAN at the suggestion of Captain Finn Ronne, United States Navy Reserve, leader at Ellsworth Station, 1957. Doctor Allan S. Cross assisted in planning the medical supplies, in providing instruction in first aid, and in selecting trail rations for the RARE, 1947-48.

=== Wrigley Bluffs ===
84°34′S 63°45′W. Rock bluffs 4 nautical miles (7.4 km; 4.6 mi) long, standing 3 nautical miles (5.6 km; 3.5 mi) north of Mount Cross. Named by US-ACAN for Richard J. Wrigley, equipment operator at Palmer Station, winter 1966.

=== Mount Lowry ===
84°33′S 64°09′W. A mountain, 1,020 metres (3,350 ft) high, standing 2.5 nautical miles (4.6 km; 2.9 mi) northwest of Wrigley Bluffs. Named by US-ACAN for James K. Lowry, biologist at Palmer Station, winter 1967.

=== Mount Bruns ===
84°29′S 64°23′W. A mountain, 910 metres (2,990 ft) high, standing 4 nautical miles (7.4 km; 4.6 mi) north of Mount Lowry. Named by US-ACAN for John E. Bruns, glaciologist at Palmer Station, winter 1967.

=== Mount Whillans ===
84°27′S 64°15′W. A mountain, 870 metres (2,850 ft) high, standing 4 nautical miles (7.4 km; 4.6 mi) southwest of Mount Stroschein. Named by US-ACAN for lan M. Whillans, glaciologist at Palmer Station, winter 1967.

=== Mount Stroschein ===
84°25′S 63°35′W. A mountain, 1,020 metres (3,350 ft) high, standing 2 nautical miles (3.7 km; 2.3 mi) southwest of Weber Ridge. Named by US-ACN for Leander A. Stroschein, meteorologist at Plateau Station, 1965-66 and 1966-67.

=== Weber Ridge ===
84°20′S 63°12′W. A bare rock ridge, 8 nautical miles (15 km; 9.2 mi) long, located at the north end of Anderson Hills. Named by US-ACAN for Max K. Weber, USGS topographic engineer in the Pensacola Mountains, 1965-66.

== Sources ==
- Alberts, Fred G., ed. (1995), Geographic Names of the Antarctic (PDF) (2 ed.), United States Board on Geographic Names This article incorporates public domain material from websites or documents of the United States Board on Geographic Names.
- Thomas Hills, USGS: United States Geological Survey
- This article incorporates public domain material from websites or documents of the United States Geological Survey.
