= Barclay Kamb =

Walter Barclay Kamb (December 17, 1931 – April 21, 2011) was a longtime professor and researcher at the California Institute of Technology (Caltech). Professor Kamb was one of the first scientists to journey to the Antarctic to study how the glacier sheets move and operate. He is listed as a member of the National Academy of Sciences in the Geology department.

== Career ==
Kamb received the bachelor's degree at Caltech in 1952 and the Ph.D. in 1956, under Linus Pauling. "My best student," said Pauling. Kamb was an assistant professor of geology and geophysics at Caltech from 1956 until 1960 and an associate professor from 1960 until 1962, at which time he was raised to full professor, a rank at which he served for the next 27 years. In 1990 he was named Barbara and Stanley R. Rawn Professor, and on his retirement in 1999 became Rawn Professor Emeritus. Kamb served as chairman of the Caltech Division of Geological and Planetary Sciences from 1972 to 1983, and for a short period, from 1987 to 1989, he took charge as vice president and provost of the institute.

== Personal life ==
Barclay Kamb was born on December 17, 1931, in San Jose, California. He married Linda Pauling, the daughter of his Doctoral Supervisor (Linus Pauling). The couple had four sons and nine grandchildren.

Kamb applied for admission to Caltech at age 15. Caltech has a policy against early admission, so Kamb attended Pasadena City College. This so embarrassed Caltech that it admitted Kamb the following year. The Institute never regretted that exception. Later, following completion of his PhD, Kamb was offered the rare opportunity to join the Caltech faculty by Robert Sharp. These events were merely the start of Kamb's exceptionalism.

Kamb died at his home in Pasadena on April 21, 2011.

== Research ==
Early in his career, Kamb studied the determination of the atomic structure of minerals, and how they related to different structures of ice. For his work in the field of minerals, Barclay Kamb was awarded the Mineralogical Society of America award in 1968. He was awarded Guggenheim Fellowships for the academic years 1959–1960 and 1961–1962.

Professor Kamb concentrated on studying structures produced by rock flow and fracture in the earth. Years later, Kamb turned his attention to studying the mechanics of glacier flow, with an emphasis on basal sliding, surging, and streaming flow in the Antarctic ice sheet. Professor Kamb focused his explorations on the flow of streams in Antarctic glacier ice sheets. His research led to very important discoveries about ice sheets in the 1990s and early 2000s. These ice sheets contained ice streams, which were streams that flowed inside of the sheets with speeds 100 times greater than the movement of the normal ice sheet motion. Kamb reported that if these streams were to increase in speed and become larger, this could potentially cause a collapse of the ice sheets.

To explain the motion of these ice streams as well as surging glaciers, he devised the theory that heat generated in the till melts water that lubricates the glacier to make the flow of the ice stream more like a landslide than a normal glacier. One of his most important contributions to the study of glacier motion was drilling through glaciers to their bases and sampling and imaging the contact between the glacier and the underlying rock. In order to study these ice streams, Kamb and a team of 13 to 14 people made multiple expeditions to the Antarctic. In the October 2002 to January 2003 expedition, they installed video cameras and equipment to allow for remote data analysis, so teams would not have to venture out so often.

Barclay Kamb and Hermann Engelhardt, both researchers at Caltech who led the teams, were honored by the American Advisory Committee on Antarctic Names (ACAN) with the renaming of an ice stream and ice ridge into Kamb Ice Stream and Engelhardt Ice Ridge, respectively.

In 1977 Barclay Kamb was awarded the Seligman Crystal by the International Glaciological Society. The Crystal is considered to be one of the highest awards in glaciology.
