= Van der Veen Ice Stream =

Ice stream in Antarctica

Van der Veen Ice Stream (83°50′S 130°00′W), formerly Ice Stream B1, is a large southeastern tributary to the Whillans Ice Stream in Marie Byrd Land, Antarctica. Named by Advisory Committee on Antarctic Names (US-ACAN) after Cornelis J. "Kees" van der Veen, Byrd Polar Research Center and Departments of Geological Sciences and Geography, Ohio State University; glacial theoretician and collaborator with Ian Whillans, 1986–2001, in many seminal reports on the dynamics of the West Antarctic Ice Sheet, including former Ice Stream B, now Whillans Ice Stream.

== See also ==
- List of glaciers in the Antarctic
- List of Antarctic ice streams
