= David Drewry =

British scientist

7th Vice-Chancellor University of Hull
- In office 1999–2009
- Preceded by: David Dilks
- Succeeded by: Calie Pistorius

Personal details
- Born: 22 September 1947 (age 78) Grimsby Lincolnshire, England

David John Drewry (born 22 September 1947, in Grimsby) is a glaciologist and geophysicist who was described in the conferring of an honorary degree by Anglia Ruskin University in 1998 as having an "outstanding reputation as an eminent scientist of international repute". Drewry has also received several awards for his work. Since 1 July 2015 he is the vice-president of the European University Association.

== Early life ==
Drewry was educated at Havelock Grammar School (now the Havelock Academy) in Grimsby. He then studied at Queen Mary College in east London, graduating with a BSc in Geography in 1969. He then studied in Cambridge, residing at Emmanuel College, Cambridge, and completed a PhD on Glaciology and Geophysics in 1974 with thesis titled Sub-ice relief and geology of East Antarctica.

== Career ==
From 1978 to 1983, Drewry was a senior research assistant at the Scott Polar Research Institute, and then assistant director of research in 1983. He was director of the Scott Polar Research Institute from 1984 to 1987, and then director of the British Antarctic Survey from 1987 to 1994. He is an honorary fellow of Emmanuel College, Cambridge.

He became the vice-chancellor designate of the University of Hull in November 1999, being designated to take over on the planned retirement of the previous incumbent, David Dilks, in January 2000. On 1 September 2009, he was succeeded by Calie Pistorius, formerly the vice-chancellor of the University of Pretoria.

== Awards and honours ==
Drewry has received several awards and honours for his work.

- Polar Medal (UK)
- Antarctica Service Medal (USA)
- 1994 – Prix de la Belgica Gold Medal of the Royal Belgian Academy of Sciences
- 1998 – Patron's Medal of the Royal Geographical Society

Drewry Ice Stream in Ellsworth Land and Mount Drewry in the Queen Alexandra Range are named after him.

== Personal life ==
Drewry is married to Gillian Elizabeth and lives in East Yorkshire and London.
