= Thomas Hills (Antarctica) =

Linear group of hills

- Location within Antarctica

Geography
- Continent: Antarctica
- Range coordinates: 84°21′S 65°12′W

The Thomas Hills (84°21′S 65°12′W) are a linear group of hills, 17 nautical miles (31 km; 20 mi) long, between Foundation Ice Stream and MacNamara Glacier at the north end of the Patuxent Range in the Pensacola Mountains, Antarctica.

== Exploration and name ==
The Thomas Hills were mapped by the United States Geological Survey (USGS) from surveys and from United States Navy air photos, 1956–66. They were named by the United States Advisory Committee on Antarctic Names (US-ACAN) at the suggestion of Captain Finn Ronne, United States Navy Reserve, leader at Ellsworth Station, 1957. Charles S. Thomas was United States Secretary of the Navy, 1954–57, during the first few years of United States Navy Operation Deep Freeze.

== Location ==
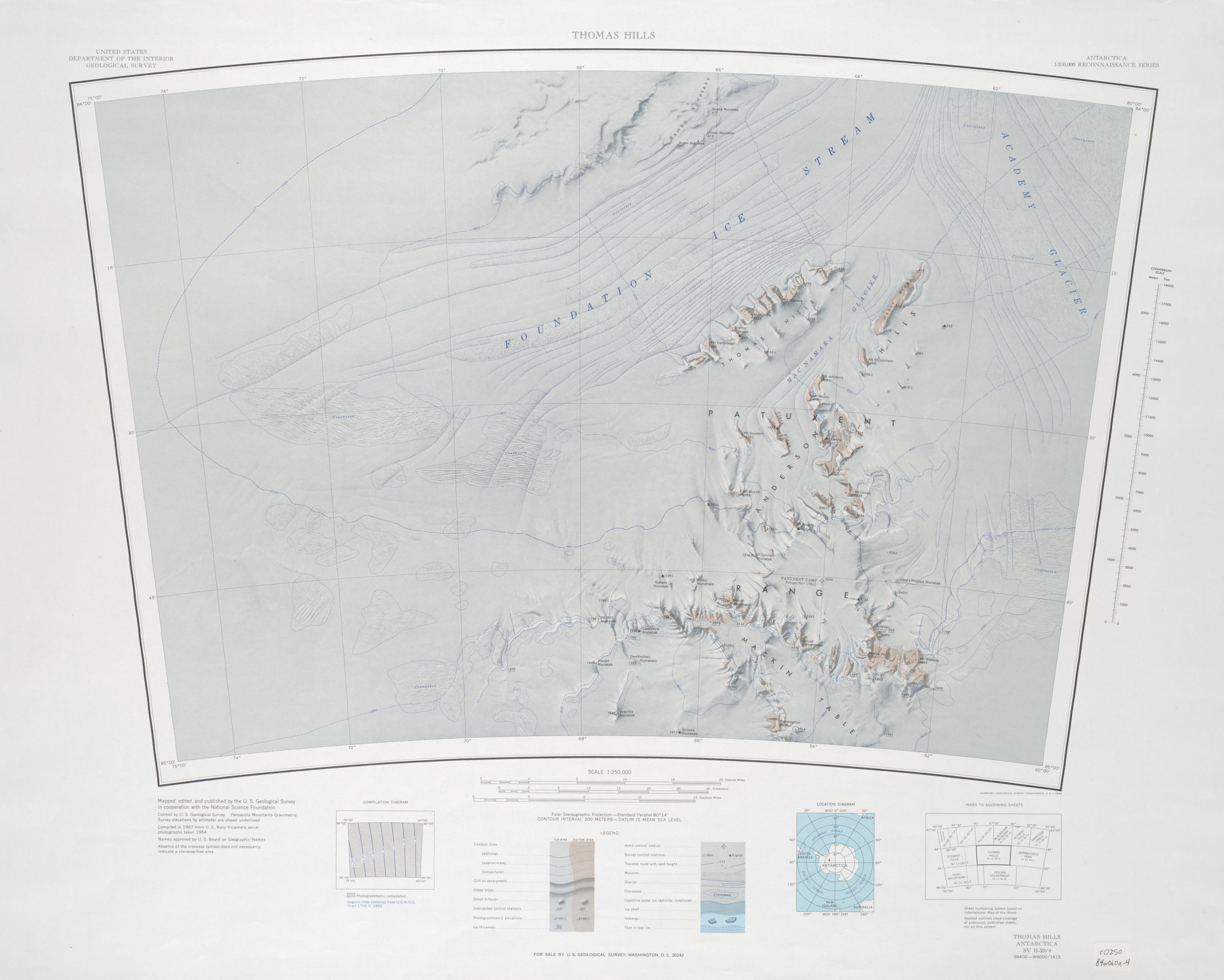
Thomas Hills to east of center

The Thomas Hills run in a northeast direction between the Foundation Ice Stream and the MacNamara Glacier. They parallel the Anderson Hills on the south side of the MacNamara Glacier. Features, from west to east, include Mount Yarbrough, Nance Ridge, Martin Peak and Mount Warnke.

== Features ==
=== Mount Yarbrough ===
84°24′S 66°00′W. A ridge-like mountain, 865 metres (2,838 ft) high, standing 2 nautical miles (3.7 km; 2.3 mi) southwest of Nance Ridge. Named by US-ACAN for Leonard S. Yarbrough, industrial engineer at Plateau Station, 1965-66.

=== Nance Ridge ===
84°23′S 65°36′W. A rock ridge 2 nautical miles (3.7 km; 2.3 mi) northeast of Mount Yarbrough. Named by US-ACAN for Vernon L. Nance, radioman at Palmer Station, winter 1966.

=== Martin Peak ===
84°22′S 65°21′W. A peak, 1,045 metres (3,428 ft) high, standing 2 nautical miles (3.7 km; 2.3 mi) northeast of Nance Ridge. Named by US-ACAN for Christopher Martin, biologist at Palmer Station, 1966-67.

=== Mount Warnke ===
84°20′S 64°55′W. A mountain, 915 metres (3,002 ft) high, standing 3 nautical miles (5.6 km; 3.5 mi) northeast of Martin Peak. Named by US-ACAN for Detlef A. Warnke, biologist at Palmer Station, 1966-67.

== Sources ==
- Alberts, Fred G., ed. (1995), Geographic Names of the Antarctic (PDF) (2 ed.), United States Board on Geographic Names This article incorporates public domain material from websites or documents of the United States Board on Geographic Names.
- Thomas Hills, USGS: United States Geological Survey
- This article incorporates public domain material from websites or documents of the United States Geological Survey.
