= Institute Ice Stream =

Ice stream of Antarctica

- Location within Antarctica
- Location: Queen Elizabeth Land
- Coordinates: 82°S 75°W
- Thickness: unknown
- Terminus: Filchner-Ronne Ice Shelf
- Status: unknown

The Institute Ice Stream (82°S 75°W) is an ice stream flowing north into the Ronne Ice Shelf, Antarctica, southeast of Hercules Inlet. The feature was traversed by the United States Antarctic Research Program (USARP) Ellsworth–Byrd Seismic Party, 1958–59, and the USARP – University of Wisconsin Seismic Party, 1963–64. It was delineated by the Scott Polar Research Institute – National Science Foundation – Technical University of Denmark airborne radio echo sounding program, 1967–79, and in association with Foundation Ice Stream and Support Force Glacier, named after the Scott Polar Research Institute, Cambridge, England.

== See also ==
- List of glaciers in the Antarctic
- Glaciology
