= Alison Ice Stream =

Ice stream in Antarctica

Coordinates: 73°55′S 82°4′W

Alison Ice Stream is an ice stream about 8 nautical miles (15 km) long flowing into Eltanin Bay south of Wirth Peninsula, Antarctica. It was named by the Advisory Committee on Antarctic Names after Alison Cook, a British Antarctic Survey computer specialist, part of the United States-United Kingdom cooperative project to compile glaciological and coastal change maps of the Antarctic Peninsula in the late 1990s and early 2000s.

== See also ==
- Ice stream
