= Wiesnet Ice Stream =

Ice stream in Antarctica

Coordinates: 73°24′S 86°52′W

Wiesnet Ice Stream is an ice stream about 15 nautical miles (28 km) long flowing into Venable Ice Shelf west of Allison Peninsula. Named by Advisory Committee on Antarctic Names (US-ACAN) after Donald R. Wiesnet, National Oceanic and Atmospheric Administration, pioneer, from the 1970s to the 1980s, in the use of remotely sensed data for mapping Antarctica and first to conceive of the use of polar orbiting satellite data to completely map the continent.
