= Laurence McKinley Gould =

American geologist and explorer (1896-1995)

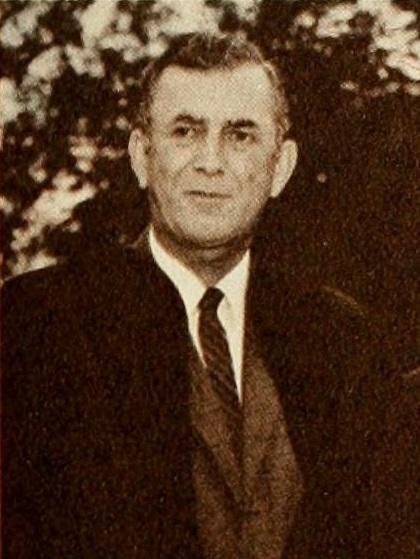
- Gould in 1961

4th President of Carleton College
- In office 1945–1962
- Preceded by: Donald Cowling
- Succeeded by: John Nason

Personal details
- Born: August 22, 1896 Lacota, Michigan, U.S.
- Died: June 21, 1995 (aged 98)
- Education: University of Michigan

Laurence McKinley Gould (August 22, 1896 – June 21, 1995) was an American geologist, educator, and polar explorer. He made expeditions to both the Arctic and Antarctic, and was chief scientist on Richard Evelyn Byrd's first Antarctic expedition, which Gould described in his 1931 book Cold: the Record of an Antarctic Sledge Journey. He served as president of Carleton College from 1945 to 1962, and president of the American Association for the Advancement of Science in 1964. His namesakes include the research vessel Laurence M. Gould as well as Antarctic features including Gould Bay, Gould Coast, and Mount Gould.

== Biography ==
Gould was born in Lacota, Michigan on August 22, 1896. After completing high school in South Haven, Michigan in 1914, he went to Boca Raton, Florida and taught grades 1 to 8 in a one-room school for two years, while saving money for college. He enrolled at the University of Michigan in 1916, but interrupted his education the following year to enlist in the U.S. Army following U.S. entry into World War I. He served in the Army until 1919, when he returned to the university to resume his studies.

After graduating in 1921 with a B.S. degree in geology he joined the University of Michigan faculty as a geology instructor while continuing his studies there. During his undergraduate days, he was the founder of the Beta Tau chapter of the Pi Kappa Alpha fraternity. He also was an active member in the university Society of Les Voyageurs. He received an M.A. degree in 1923 and a D.Sc. degree in 1925, with a dissertation on the geology of Utah's La Sal Mountains, and he advanced to assistant professor in 1926, and to associate professor in 1930.

== Polar expeditions ==
=== Arctic ===
In the summer of 1926 Gould undertook his first trip to the Arctic, serving as assistant director and geologist with the University of Michigan Greenland Expedition. The following summer he was geographer and topologist for George P. Putnam's expedition to survey the coast of Baffin Island in Arctic Canada.

=== Antarctic ===
During 1928 to 1930 he accompanied Richard E. Byrd on his first expedition to Antarctica, serving as the expedition's chief scientist and second-in-command.

In March 1929 Gould along with Harold June and Bernt Balchen flew in the expeditions Fokker Universal east to establish a geologic camp near the Rockefeller Mountains at the edge of what would soon be known as Marie Byrd Land. A furious blizzard hit, destroying their plane. Not having radio contact with the party for ten days, Byrd made a rescue flight that found them marooned but well. During that time they had continued scientific observations.

On November 4, 1929, Gould and five companions began a grueling 2½ month, 1500-mile dog-sledge journey into the Queen Maud Mountains, with the primary purpose of providing ground support and possible emergency assistance for Byrd's historic first airplane flight over the South Pole and a secondary purpose of conducting the first geological and glaciological survey of an area that Gould called "a veritable paradise for a geologist."

After the flight over the Pole in November 1929, Gould and his companions climbed Mount Fridtjof Nansen to investigate its geology. The layered sandstones that Gould found in outcrops at the mountain's peak helped confirm that Antarctica was linked geologically to the Earth's southern continents in Gondwana.

The expedition's progress had been reported regularly in the news media, and after his return he received the Byrd Antarctic Expedition Medal in gold, the 1930 David Livingstone Gold Medal of the American Geographical Society, and a Medal of the Mayor's Committee of the City of New York.

== Academic career ==
On August 2, 1930, two weeks after returning from Antarctica, Gould married Margaret ("Peg") Rice in Ann Arbor, Michigan. She had been a student in one of his classes at the University of Michigan.

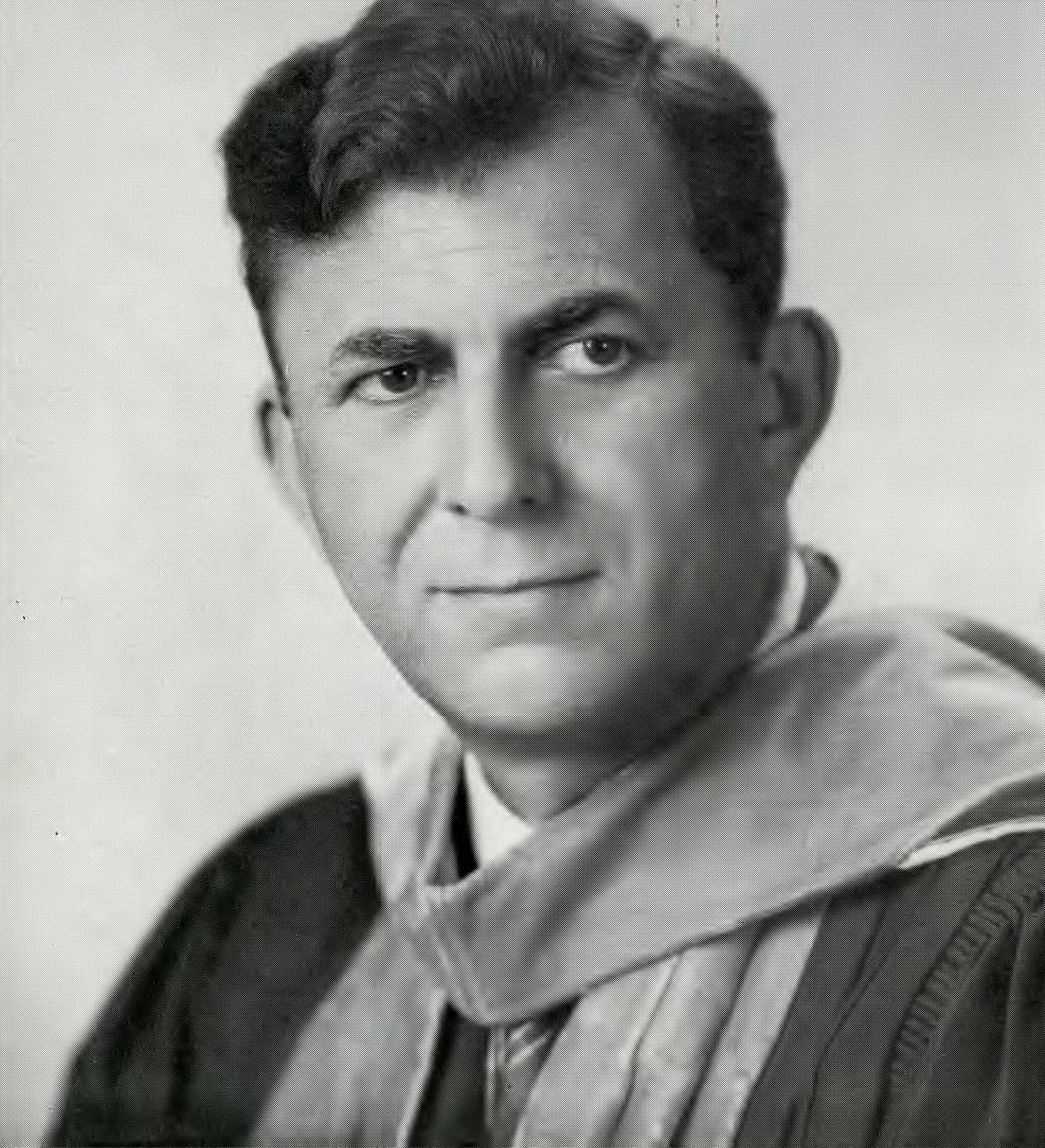
Gould circa 1946

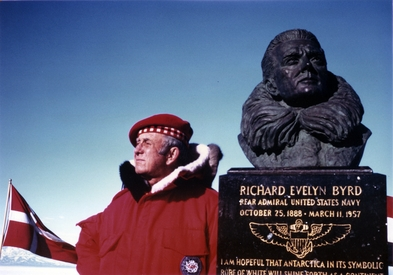
Gould next to a bust of Richard E. Byrd in Antarctica, 1977

In the months and years after returning from Antarctica, Gould traveled around the US giving lectures on the experience. His 1931 book Cold: the Record of an Antarctic Sledge Journey described the dog-sledge trek, recalling blinding blizzards, snow bridges that collapsed into deep crevasses, and weather so cold that it nearly froze a person's eyelids shut. Additionally, he published several scientific articles about the findings of the Byrd expedition.

In 1932 Gould and his family moved to Minnesota after he accepted a position as a full professor at Carleton College where he founded and served as chairman of the geology department. Gould was named president of the college in 1945, holding that position until 1962. In 1962 he took his retirement package from Carleton College, and then accepted a position on the geology faculty at the University of Arizona where he taught from 1963 through 1979.

He also served as President of the American Association for the Advancement of Science.

During his lifetime, Gould was the recipient of 26 honorary degrees. In 1995 Carleton College renamed its college library the Laurence McKinley Gould Library in his honor. The R/V Laurence M. Gould, a 76-m-long ice-strengthened research ship built in 1997 for the National Science Foundation and designed for year-round polar operations, is named in his honor. He is also commemorated in the names of several places in Antarctica, including Mount Gould, Gould Bay, and Gould Coast.

== Bibliography ==
- Gould, Laurence McKinley Cold: the Record of an Antarctic Sledge Journey. Brewer, Warren & Putnam, 1931.
- Gould, Laurence McKinley Cold: The Record of an Antarctic Sledge Journey. Carleton College, 1984.
- Gould, Laurence McKinley Cold: The Record of an Antarctic Sledge Journey. Carleton College, 2011.
- Hillemann, Eric A Beacon So Bright: The Life of Laurence McKinley Gould . Carleton College, 2012. ISBN 978-0979742323
