= Bailey Ice Stream =

Glacier in Antarctica

- Location within Antarctica
- Location: Filchner-Ronne Ice Shelf
- Coordinates: 79°00′S 30°00′W
- Thickness: unknown
- Terminus: Filchner Ice Shelf
- Status: unknown

Bailey Ice Stream (79°0′S 30°0′W) is an ice stream on the northern margin of the Theron Mountains, flowing west-southwest to the Filchner Ice Shelf. It was named by the UK Antarctic Place-Names Committee after Jeremy Thomas Bailey (1941–65), a British Antarctic Survey glaciologist, who with two companions died in a crevasse accident during a radio echo sounding traverse inland from Halley Station on 12 October 1965. On an earlier traverse in April 1965, Bailey sounded the upper portion of this feature.

== See also ==
- List of glaciers in the Antarctic
- Glaciology
