= Robert Bindschadler =

American physicist

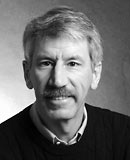
- Dr. Robert Bindschadler
- Born: Pittsburgh, Pennsylvania
- Education: University of Washington; University of Michigan
- Known for: 25 years of active Antarctic field research
- Awards: Goddard Senior fellow
- Scientific career
- Fields: Geophysics

Robert A. Bindschadler is a senior fellow at NASA's Goddard Space Flight Center and has been an active field researcher in the Antarctic for over 25 years. He is a past president of the International Glaciological Society, chairs the West Antarctic Ice Sheet Initiative, is an editor for the Journal of Glaciology and has led 14 expeditions to Antarctica and has participated in numerous other expeditions around the world including Greenland. He has also testified before Congress and has briefed the U.S. vice president concerning ice-sheet stability and is often quoted or featured in the media. He was born in Pittsburgh and received a B.S. in astronomy and physics in 1971 from the University of Michigan and earned his PhD in geophysics from the University of Washington in 1978 and did postdoctoral work in Switzerland prior to working at NASA.

His work revolves around the dynamics of glaciers and ice sheets using remote sensing technology. He has developed applications used to measure ice velocity and elevation using radar imagery which monitors the melting of ice sheets and detects changes in the volume of ice-sheets using radar altimetry. He has received numerous awards including Exceptional scientific achievement by NASA in 1994 as well as the Goddard Senior fellow in 2000.

The Bindschadler Glacier and Bindschadler Ice Stream is named after him.

== Notes ==
- "Antarctic field tests of SARSAT personal locater beacons", 1987, NASA Technical Reports Server
- "Data report for the Siple Coast (Antarctica) project",1988, NASA Technical Reports Server
- "Altimetric system: Earth observing system. Volume 2h: Panel report", 1989, NASA Technical Reports Server
- "Declassified Intelligence Satellite Photography (DISP) Coverage of Antarctica ", 1998, NASA Technical Reports Server
- "Growth of Greenland ice sheet - Measurement", 1989, NASA Technical Reports Server
- "Surface topography of the Greenland Ice Sheet from satellite radar altimetry",1989, NASA Technical Reports Server
- "AVHRR imagery reveals Antarctic ice dynamics", 1990, NASA Technical Reports Server
- "Satellite radar altimetry over ice. Volume 1: Processing and corrections of Seasat data over Greenland", 1990, NASA Technical Reports Server
- "Satellite radar altimetry over ice. Volume 2: Users' guide for Greenland elevation data from Seasat",1990, NASA Technical Reports Server
- "Satellite radar altimetry over ice. Volume 4: Users' guide for Antarctica elevation data from Seasat",1990, NASA Technical Reports Server
- "Application of image cross-correlation to the measurement of glacier velocity using satellite image data", 1992, NASA Technical Reports Server
- "Interpretation of SAR imagery of the Greenland ice sheet using coregistered TM imagery", 1992, NASA Technical Reports Server
- "Styles of deformation in Ishtar Terra and their implications", 1992, NASA Technical Reports Server
- "Venus tectonics - An overview of Magellan observations', 1992, NASA Technical Reports
- "The mass balance of the ice plain of Ice Stream B and Crary Ice Rise", 1993, NASA Technical Reports Server
- "Monitoring of the Greenland Ice Sheet using ERS-1 synthetic aperture radar imagery", 1993, NASA Technical Reports Server
- "Possible Stick-Slip Mechanism for Whillans Ice Stream". 1993, NASA Technical Reports Server
- "Ice measurements by Geosat radar altimetry", 1997, NASA Technical Reports Server
- "Changes in the Pasterze and the Kleines Fleisskees Glaciers, Austria, as Measured from the Ground and Space", 2002, NASA Technical Reports Server
- "Glaciology in Antarctica ", 2003, NASA Technical Reports Server
- "Possible Stick-Slip Mechanism for Whillans Ice Stream", 2003, NASA Technical Reports Server
- "The New Landsat Image Mosaic of Antarctica; A Part of Your World You've Never Seen Before", 2008, NASA Technical Reports Server
