= David Dilks =

British historian (born 1938)

6th Vice-Chancellor of the University of Hull
- In office 1991–1999
- Preceded by: Sir William Taylor
- Succeeded by: David Drewry

Personal details
- Born: 17 March 1938 (age 88) Foleshill, Warwickshire, England
- Education: Hertford College, Oxford (BA)

David N. Dilks, FRHistS, FRSL (born 17 March 1938) is a British historian and former professor of International History at the University of Leeds.

== Early life and education ==
Dilks was born in Foleshill, a suburb of Coventry, and attended The Royal Grammar School Worcester before winning a scholarship to Hertford College, Oxford, to read history.

== Academic career ==
Dilks remained in Oxford to do research at St Antony's College before becoming research assistant to Anthony Eden and Harold Macmillan. He was the official biographer of the latter as well as producing a two-volume biography of the viceroy of India, George Curzon, 1st Marquess Curzon of Kedleston, and an incomplete biography of Neville Chamberlain.

Dilks was Professor of International History at the University of Leeds from 1970 to 1991.

In 1977 he became a Visiting Fellow of All Souls College, Oxford. He was elected a Fellow of the Royal Society of Literature in 1986.

Professor Dilks became Vice Chancellor of the University of Hull in 1991, serving until 1999.

== Selected works ==
- Sir Winston Churchill. Hamish Hamilton, 1965. (from the "Men and Movements" series)
- Curzon in India. Rupert Hart-Davis, 1969–70. (2 vols.)
- The Diaries of Sir Alexander Cadogan, 1938-1945. Cassell, 1971. (editor)
- The Conservatives: A History from their Origins to 1965. George Allen & Unwin, 1977. (contributor; editor Rab Butler)
- Retreat from Power: Studies in Britain's Foreign Policy of the Twentieth Century. Macmillan, 1981. (2 vols.)
- Neville Chamberlain: Volume 1, 1869-1929. Cambridge University Press, 1984.
- The Missing Dimension: Governments and Intelligence Communities in the Twentieth Century. Macmillan, 1984. (co-editor with Christopher Andrew)
- The Office of Prime Minister in Twentieth-Century Britain. University of Hull Press, 1993.
- Barbarossa: The Axis and the Allies. Edinburgh University Press, 1994. (co-editor with John Erickson)
- Communications, the Commonwealth and the Future. University of Hull Press, 1994.
- The Conference at Potsdam, 1945. University of Hull Press, 1995.
- Epic and Tragedy: Britain and Poland, 1941-1945. University of Hull Press, 1995.
- Rights, Wrongs and Rivalries: Britain and France in 1945. University of Hull Press, 1996.
- de Gaulle and the British. University of Hull Press, 1996.
- Great Britain, the Commonwealth and the Wider World, 1939-45. University of Hull Press, 1998.
- Collective Security, 1919 and Now. University of Hull Press, 1999.
- The Great Dominion: Winston Churchill in Canada 1900-1954. Thomas Allen & Son, 2005.
- Churchill and Company: Allies and Rivals in War and Peace. I.B. Tauris, 2012.
