= Drewry Ice Stream =

Ice stream in Antarctica

Drewry Ice Stream (75°40′00″S 073°00′00″W) is an ice stream in eastern Ellsworth Land that flows southwest from the area between the Behrendt Mountains and Mount Hassage into Evans Ice Stream. Named by the UK Antarctic Place-names Committee for Professor David John Drewry, former Director of Scott Polar Research Institute and the British Antarctic Survey.
