= Gould Bay =

Gould Bay Camp
- Camp
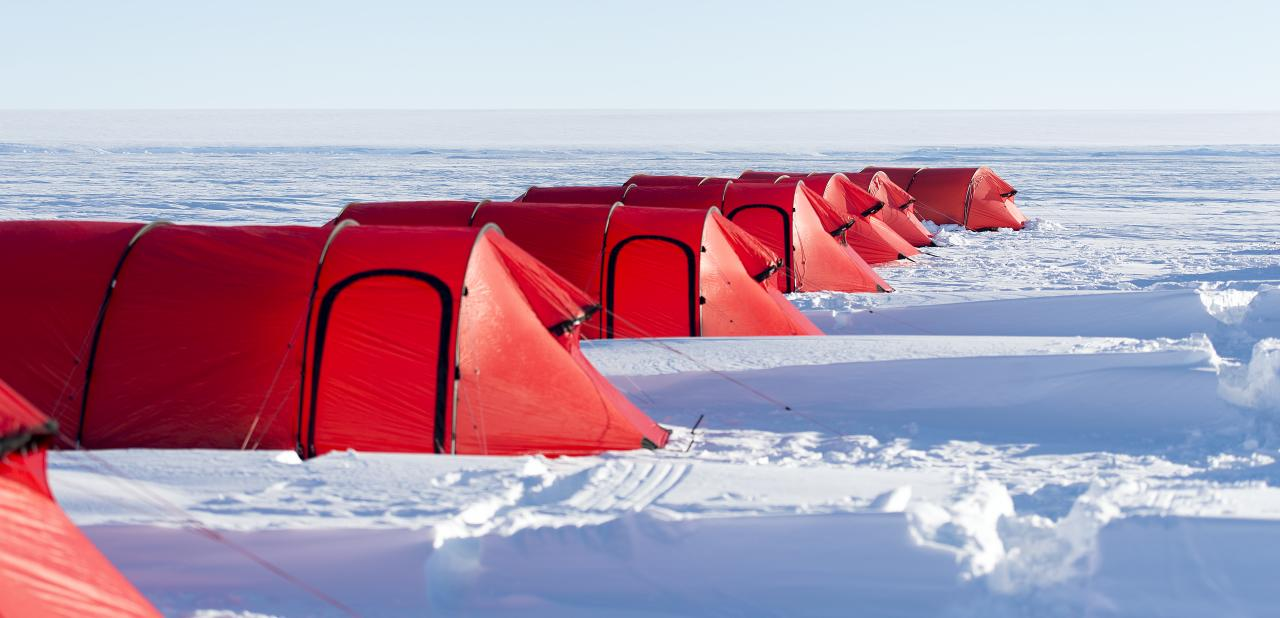
- Gould Bay Camp

- Location of Gould Bay in Antarctica
- Coordinates: 77°44′05″S 47°32′05″W
- Country: United States
- Location in Antarctica: Gould Bay; Filchner-Ronne Ice Shelf; Antarctica
- Administered by: Antarctic Logistics & Expeditions
- Type: Seasonal
- Status: Operational

Gould Bay (78°0′S 45°0′W) is a bay located at the junction of the Filchner Ice Shelf with the northeast corner of Berkner Island, in the southern Weddell Sea. It was discovered by the Ronne Antarctic Research Expedition, 1947–48, under the leadership of Commander Finn Ronne, U.S. Navy Reserve, who named this bay for Laurence M. Gould, geologist, geographer, and second in command of the Byrd Antarctic Expedition, 1928–30. It is considered a key biodiversity area because of the emperor penguin colony that breeds on the ice about 90km northwest of Gould Bay.

== See also ==
- List of Antarctic field camps
