= Fox Ice Stream =

Ice stream in Antarctica

Fox Ice Stream (73°28′S 85°29′W) is an ice stream about 6 nautical miles (11 km) long flowing into Eltanin Bay southwest of Wirth Peninsula, Antarctica. It was named by the Advisory Committee on Antarctic Names after Adrian Fox of the British Antarctic Survey, part of the USA–UK cooperative project to compile Glaciological and Coastal-Change Maps of the Antarctic Peninsula; he was active in field and mapping projects from the early 1990s onwards.
