= Ferrigno Ice Stream =

Ice stream in Antarctica

Ferrigno Ice Stream (73°43′S 83°49′W) is an ice Stream more than 15 nautical miles (28 km) long flowing into Eltanin Bay southwest of Wirth Peninsula, Antarctica. It was named by the Advisory Committee on Antarctic Names after Jane G. Ferrigno of the United States Geological Survey (USGS). Ferrigno has been a specialist for some decades from the 1970s in the use of satellite imagery for glacier studies and map compilation, co-leader of the USGS team that compiled the 1:5,000,000-scale radiometer maps of Antarctica, and task leader of the team that is compiling 25 glaciological and coastal-change maps of Antarctica.

Beneath the glacier lies the Ferrigno Rift, a rift valley some 1.5 km deep, 10 km wide, and at least 100 km long. The rift valley was discovered using ice-penetrating radar during a survey of the glacier in 2010 by a team from the British Antarctic Survey and the University of Aberdeen investigating ice-melt on the glacier that had been measured using satellites. The ice-filled rift valley is connected to the ocean and is believed to impact ice loss on the West Antarctic Ice Sheet.
