= Mackin Table =

Mountain in Antarctika

- Location within Antarctica

Geography
- Continent: Antarctica
- Range coordinates: 84°57′S 64°0′W

The Mackin Table (84°57′S 64°0′W) is an ice-topped, wedge-shaped plateau, about 20 nautical miles (37 km; 23 mi) long, standing just north of Patuxent Ice Stream in the Patuxent Range of the Pensacola Mountains, Antarctica.

== Exploration and name ==
The Mackin Table was mapped by the United States Geological Survey (USGS) from surveys and United States Navy air photos, 1956–66. It was named for J. Hoover Mackin, professor of geology at the University of Washington, at Seattle. The name was suggested by United States Antarctic Research Program (USARP) geologists who investigated the Pensacola Mountains, several having been students under Mackin.

== Location ==
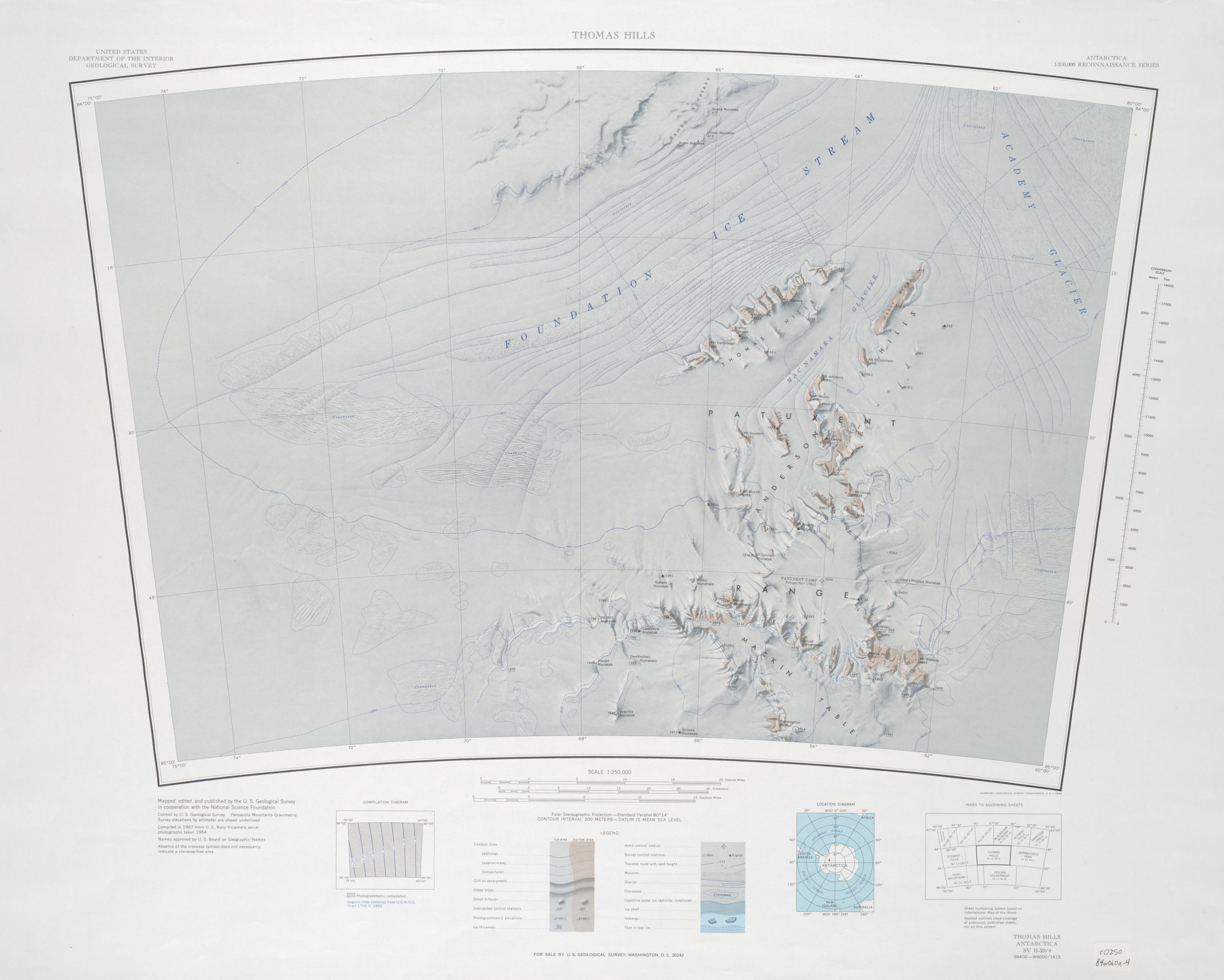
Mackin Table in southeast of map

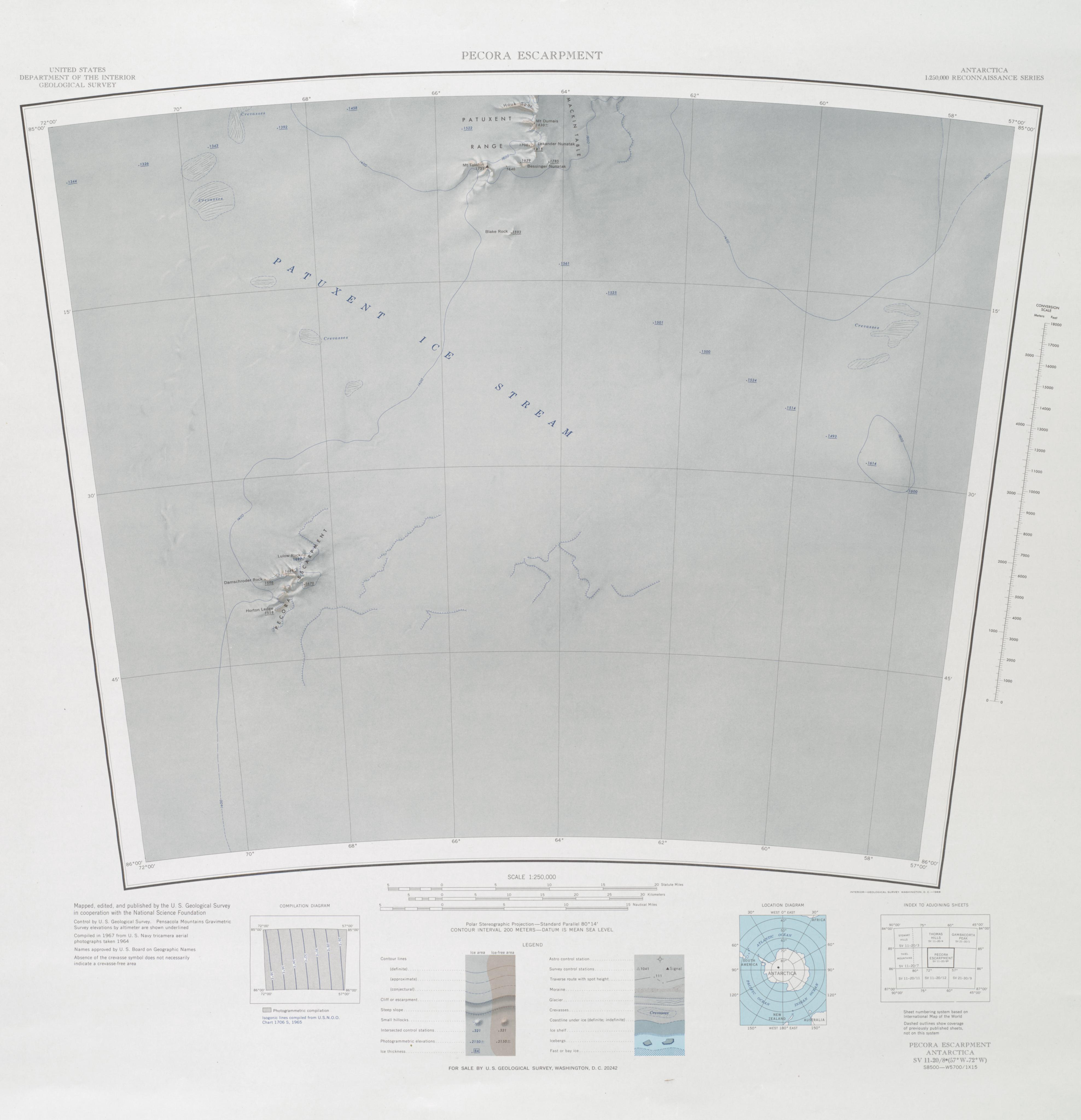
South tip of Mackin Table in north center of map

The Mackin Table is in the southeast of the Patuxent Range, to the south of the Anderson Hills and east of Snake Ridge. The Patuxent Ice Stream flows past the south end of the Mackin Table. The east of the table contains the Shurley Ridge, Plankington Bluff, Houk Spur and Mount Dumais. The southern tip contains Mount Tolchin, Lekander Nunatak and Bessinger Nunatak, and is north of Blake Rock. The northern edge of the table holds Mount Weininger, Mount Campleman, Stout Spur, Pierce Peak, the Sullivan Peaks and Mount Wanous. Phillips Nunatak is just north of Sullivan Peaks.

== Eastern features ==
=== Shurley Ridge ===
84°54′S 65°23′W. A partly snow-covered ridge projecting from the southwest side of Mackin Table, 6 nautical miles (11 km; 6.9 mi) southeast of Snake Ridge. Named by the United States Advisory Committee on Antarctic Names (US-ACAN) for Jay T. Shurley, biologist at South Pole Station, summer 1966-67.

=== Plankington Bluff ===
84°58′S 64°37′W. A large rock bluff along the southwest edge of Mackin Table, 5 nautical miles (9.3 km; 5.8 mi) southeast of Shurley Ridge. Named by US-ACAN for John C. Plankington, Jr., meteorologist at South Pole Station, winter 1967.

=== Houk Spur ===
85°01′S 64°45′W. A bare rock spur extending from the southwest side of Mackin Table, 1 nautical mile (1.9 km; 1.2 mi) north of Mount Dumais. Named by US-ACAN for Lieutenant Vernon N. Houk (MC) United States Navy, officer in charge of South Pole Station, winter 1958.

=== Mount Dumais ===
85°02′S 64°28′W. A bluff-type mountain, 1,830 metres (6,000 ft) high, standing on the southwest edge of Mackin Table, 2 nautical miles (3.7 km; 2.3 mi) north of Lekander Nunatak. Named by US-ACAN for Lieutenant Clarence C. Dumais (MC) United States Navy, officer in charge of South Pole Station, winter 1960.

== Southern features ==
=== Mount Tolchin ===
85°06′S 65°12′W. A mountain, 1,730 metres (5,680 ft) high, standing 5 nautical miles (9.3 km; 5.8 mi) southwest of Houk Spur at the southwest extremity of Mackin Table. Named by US-ACAN for Lieutenant Sidney Tolchin (MC) United States Navy, officer in charge of South Pole Station, winter 1959.

=== Lekander Nunatak ===
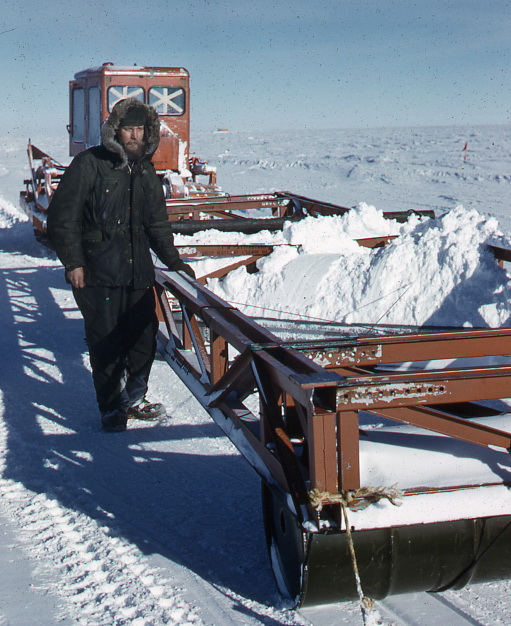
Lekander & grader smoothing South Pole Station runway.

85°04′S 64°29′W. A nunatak, 1,815 metres (5,955 ft) high, standing along the southwest edge of Mackin Table, 2 nautical miles (3.7 km; 2.3 mi) northeast of Bessinger Nunatak. Named by US-ACAN for Bryant A. Lekander, cook at South Pole Station, winter 1960.

=== Bessinger Nunatak ===
85°05′S 64°41′W. A mound-shaped nunatak, 1,640 metres (5,380 ft) high, standing at the southwest end of Mackin Table, 3 nautical miles (5.6 km; 3.5 mi) east of Mount Tolchin. Named by US-ACAN for Lieutenant C.D. Bessinger, Jr. (MC) United States Navy, officer in charge of South Pole Station, winter 1963.

=== Blake Rock ===
85°11′S 64°50′W. An isolated rock lying 5 nautical miles (9.3 km; 5.8 mi) south of the south end of Mackin Table. Mapped by USGS from surveys and United States Navy air photos, 1956-66. Named by US-ACAN for Joseph A. Blake, Jr., construction electrician at South Pole Station, winter 1960.

== Northern features ==
=== Mount Weininger ===
84°47′S 65°30′W. A large, mainly ice-free mountain, 1,970 metres (6,460 ft) high, standing at the north extremity of Mackin Table, to which it is joined by a short ridge. Named by US-ACAN for Richard B. Weininger, scientific leader at South Pole Station, winter 1967.

=== Mount Campleman ===
84°51′S 64°20′W. A flat-topped, projecting-type mountain, 1,970 metres (6,460 ft) high, along the north edge of Mackin Table, 3 nautical miles (5.6 km; 3.5 mi) west of Stout Spur. Named by US-ACAN for Richard Campleman (CEC) United States Navy, Petty Officer in charge of Palmer Station, winter 1967.

=== Stout Spur ===
84°52′S 63°43′W. A knife-like rock spur descending from the north edge of Mackin Table, 3 nautical miles (5.6 km; 3.5 mi) east of Mount Campleman. Named by US-ACAN for Dennis K. Stout, radioman at Palmer Station, winter 1967.

=== Pierce Peak ===
84°52′S 63°09′W. A peak, 1,790 metres (5,870 ft) high, standing 2 nautical miles (3.7 km; 2.3 mi) south of Sullivan Peaks at the northeast edge of Mackin Table. Named by US-ACAN for Chester M. Pierce who, with Jay T. Shurley, studied the psychophysiology of men while asleep and awake both before, during, and after sojourns at the South Pole Station, in 1966-67.

=== Sullivan Peaks ===
84°50′S 63°05′W. Two sharp peaks, over 1,400 metres (4,600 ft) high, on a spur descending from Pierce Peak on the north side of Mackin Table. Named by US-ACAN for Lieutenant Ronald C. Sullivan, (MC) United States Navy, officer in charge of South Pole Station, winter 1967.

=== Mount Wanous ===
84°52′S 62°20′W. A prominent, bare, conical mountain, 1,660 metres (5,450 ft) high, standing 4.5 nautical miles (8.3 km; 5.2 mi) east of Pierce Peak at the northeast edge of Mackin Table. Named by US-ACAN for Richard E. Wanous, geophysicist in the Pensacola Mountains, 1965-66.

=== Phillips Nunatak ===
84°45′S 62°35′W. A nunatak along the edge of a small ice escarpment 7 nautical miles (13 km; 8.1 mi) north of Mount Wanous. Named by US-ACAN for Harry G. Phillips, cook at Palmer Station, winter 1967.

== Sources ==
- Alberts, Fred G., ed. (1995), Geographic Names of the Antarctic (PDF) (2 ed.), United States Board on Geographic Names This article incorporates public domain material from websites or documents of the United States Board on Geographic Names.
- Thomas Hills, USGS: United States Geological Survey
- Pecora Escarpment, USGS: United States Geological Survey
- This article incorporates public domain material from websites or documents of the United States Geological Survey.
