= Kamb Ice Stream =

Glaciological area in Marie Byrd Land, Antarctica

Kamb Ice Stream (82°15′S 145°00′W), a glaciological feature of the Ross Ice Shelf of the West Antarctic Ice Sheet, formerly known as Ice Stream C, the ice stream was renamed in 2001 in honor of Caltech Glaciologist Dr. Barclay Kamb. Its margins were the focus of a sequence of scientific borehole expeditions in 2019 and 2021 where a New Zealand team melted their way through the ice to sample the oceanographic conditions below.
