= Gould Coast =

Coast in Antarctica

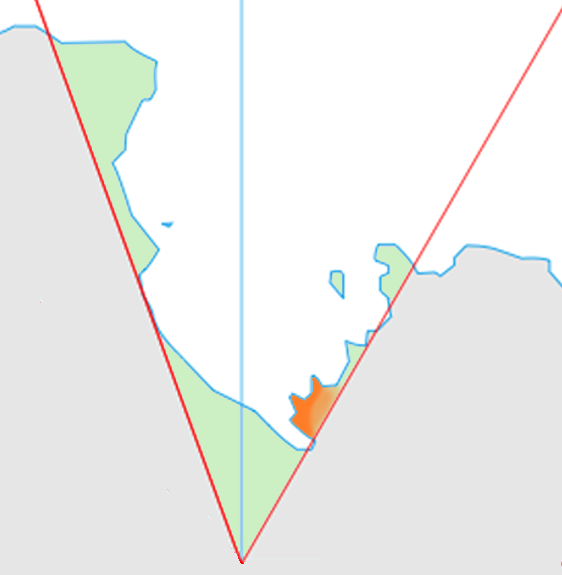
Location of the Gould Coast (marked in orange) within the Ross Dependency

The Gould Coast (84°30′S 150°0′W) is a portion of the coast of Antarctica along the eastern margin of the Ross Ice Shelf at Amundsen Coast between the west side of Scott Glacier and the south end of the Siple Coast (83°30′S 153°0′W). It was named by the New Zealand Antarctic Place-Names Committee in 1961 for Laurence M. Gould, a geologist who was second-in-command of the Byrd Antarctic Expedition, 1928–30. Gould led the Geological Party which in 1929 mapped 175 miles (280 km) of this coast. While president of Carleton College, Northfield, Minnesota, he was appointed Chairman of the U.S. National Committee for the International Geophysical Year and took a prominent part in planning the United States research program for Antarctica.
