= Siple Coast =

Coast in Antarctica

The Siple Coast (/ˈsaɪpəl/ SIGH-p'l; 82°0′S 155°0′W) is the middle portion of the relatively ill-defined coast along the east side of the Ross Ice Shelf, between the north end of Gould Coast (83°30′S 153°00′W) and the south end of Shirase Coast (80°10′S 151°00′W). The area was originally called Kirton Coast, but was renamed by NZ-APC in 1961 after Paul A. Siple, a noted American scientist-explorer who accompanied R. Admiral Richard E. Byrd on all of his Antarctic expeditions.
