= Whillans Ice Stream =

Glaciological feature of the West Antarctic Ice Sheet

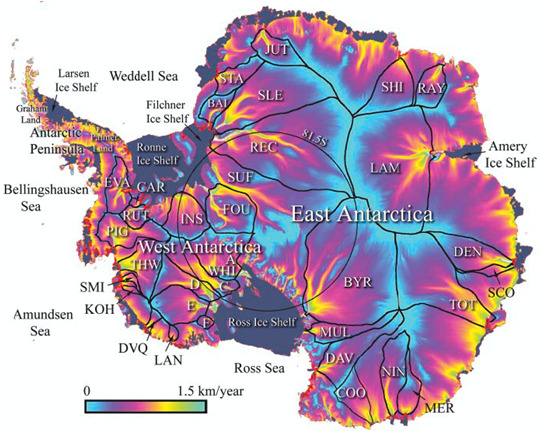
Antarctic balance velocities (note that these are not measured velocities but are inferred from the distribution of driving stress, the broad pattern however does strongly reflect actual surface velocities).

Whillans Ice Stream (83°40′S 145°00′W) is a glaciological feature of the West Antarctic Ice Sheet, formerly known as Ice Stream B, renamed in 2001 in honor of Ohio State University glaciologist Ian Whillans.

== Research ==
Whillans Ice Stream is one of about a half-dozen large, fast-moving rivers of ice pouring from the West Antarctic Ice Sheet into the Ross Ice Shelf. The ice stream is the subject of different glaciological studies, one of which is looking at subglacial lakes that researchers believe may be speeding the movement of the ice as they periodically fill and drain.

Other researchers funded by the National Science Foundation, reported in the June 5, 2008 issue of the journal Nature that, from seismological and GPS data, they discovered the Whillans Ice Stream releases two bursts of seismic waves every day, each one equivalent to a magnitude 7 earthquake. The data show that the river of ice moves about a half-meter within approximately 30 minutes, remains still for 12 hours, then moves another half-meter in phase with gravitational tides. Each time it moves, it emits seismic waves that are recorded at seismographs around Antarctica and even as far away as Australia, a distance of more than 6,400 kilometers. In 2024, it was shown that the large slow seismic events on the ice stream cause the adjoining Ross Ice Shelf to abruptly shift by up to 6 cm in the course of a few minutes as trapped seismic waves within the shelf propagate northward.

In 2007, an active subglacial water system consisting of several interconnected subglacial lakes was discovered under Whillans Ice Stream using repeat-track data from the ICESat satellite (Fricker and others, 2007). One of these active lakes, subglacial Lake Whillans, is the subject of a major drilling program funded by the National Science Foundation (Whillans Ice Stream Subglacial Access (WISSARD)) which successfully reached the lake on January 28, 2013.

In January 2015, drilling near the grounding line revealed a colony of fish, crustaceans, and jellyfish inhabiting the dark, frigid waters below the ice shelf. Images taken with a remote camera showed fish 20 centimetres (7.9 in) and amphipods.

== See also ==
- Conway Ice Ridge
