= Thomas Hills =

English cricketer

Thomas Hills (17 November 1796 – 19 April 1866) was an English cricketer who played for Kent. Hills was born in Stansted and died in West Malling.

Hills made one first-class appearance for Kent, against Nottinghamshire in 1840. Hills was bowled out in the first innings by William Clarke and suffered the same fate in the second innings at the hands of Samuel Redgate, having scored just six runs in the second innings.

Hills died at the age of 69.

== Bibliography ==
- Carlaw, Derek (2020). Kent County Cricketers, A to Z: Part One (1806–1914) (PDF). Cardiff: ACS.
