= Ice stream =

Region of fast-moving ice within an ice sheet

These animations show the motion of ice in Antarctica.

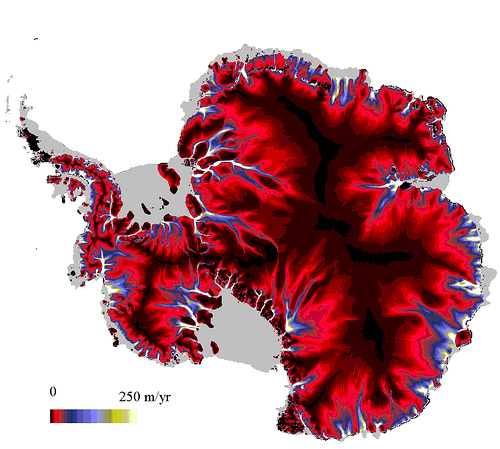
Velocity map of Antarctica. Ice streams can be seen with increasing speeds (blue-yellow-white) flowing toward the coast.

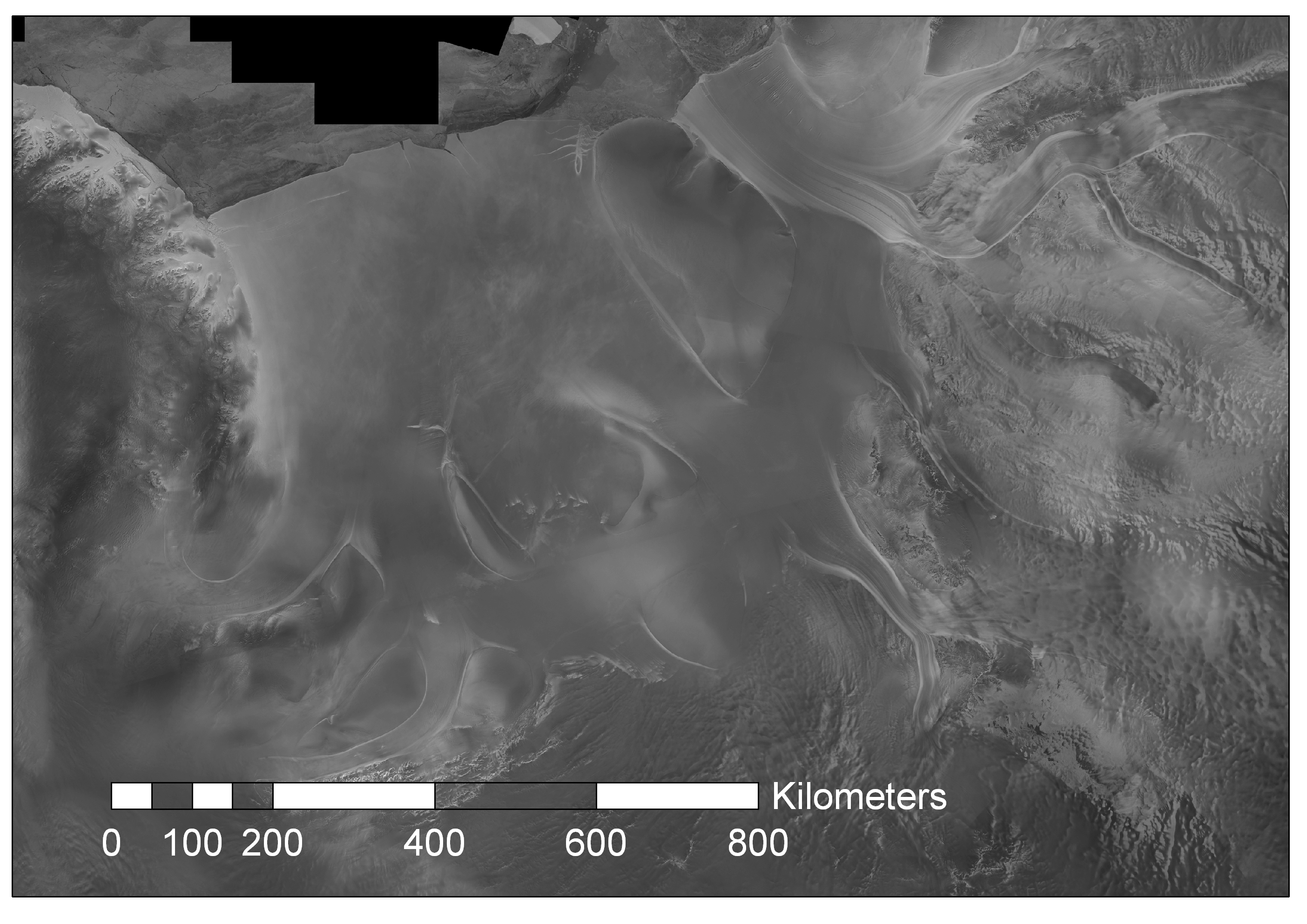
Radarsat image of ice streams flowing into the Filchner-Ronne Ice Shelf.

An ice stream is a region of fast-moving ice within an ice sheet. It is a type of glacier, a body of ice that moves under its own weight. They can move upwards of 1,000 metres (3,300 ft) a year, and can be up to 50 kilometres (31 mi) in width, and hundreds of kilometers in length. They tend to be about 2 km (1.2 mi) deep at the thickest, and constitute the majority of the ice that leaves the sheet. In Antarctica, the ice streams account for approximately 90% of the sheet's mass loss per year, and approximately 50% of the mass loss in Greenland.

The shear forces cause deformation and recrystallization that drive the movement, this movement then causes topographic lows and valleys to form after all of the material in the ice sheet has been discharged. Sediment also plays an important role in flow velocity; the softer and more easily deformed the sediment present, the easier it is for flow velocity to be higher. Most ice streams contain a layer of water at the bottom, which lubricates flow and acts to increase speed.

== Mechanics ==
Ice streams are typically found in areas of low topography, surrounded by slower moving, higher topography ice sheets. The low topography arises as a result of various factors, the most prominent being that water accumulates at topographic lows. As water accumulates, its presence increases basal sliding and therefore velocity, which causes an increase in sheet discharge. Another factor causing ice streams to be found in low regions is that thicker ice results in faster velocity. As the thicker an ice stream is, the greater the driving stress at the bed, and thus the greater the velocity. In addition to driving stress, ice streams have better insulation as the thickness of ice increases, due to it retaining higher temperatures better, it can increase the rate of deformation, as well as basal sliding. As a substance's volume increases, it requires more energy per unit volume to raise its temperature, which is one of the reasons why it is so difficult for oceans to freeze or evaporate. Water is also a poor conductor of heat, so increased thickness will not only increase the amount of heat that can be retained, but also make more energy required for heat to be lost.

In addition to thickness, water, and stresses, sediment and bedrock play a key role in the rate at which ice streams drain. If the underlying sediment is too porous, allowing for too much water to seep into it, and therefore become saturated, it will be incapable of supporting the shear stress the ice stream places on the bed. The best type of sediment for increased speed of drainage is soft, deformable sediment, that allows the ice stream to flow over the combination of sediment and till, while supporting against shear stress. If the underlying surface is bedrock, and not made of sediments, the speed will decrease. The bedrock acts to slow down the ice stream as it incises and deforms it. Flow velocity of the ice stream is not entirely constant, but in short time scales of days to weeks, it can be treated as such, over long scales, however, it is variable, depending on how the conditions of thickness, temperature, water accumulation, stresses, and base material have changed.

== Antarctica ==
The Antarctic Ice Sheet is drained to the sea by several ice streams. The largest in East Antarctica is Lambert Glacier. In West Antarctica the large Pine Island and Thwaites Glaciers are currently the most out of balance, with a total net mass loss of 85 gigatonnes (84 billion long tons; 94 billion short tons) per year measured in 2006.

Antarctica has many ice streams that carry billions of tons of ice to the sea a year. The Pine Island and Thwaites streams have the highest amount of net discharge in west Antarctica while Lambert Glacier leads the way in East Antarctica. The rate at which the Antarctic ice sheet is losing mass is accelerating and the past and ongoing acceleration of ice streams and outlet glaciers is considered to be a significant, if not the dominant cause of this recent imbalance. Ice streams hold serious implications for sea level rise as 90% of Antarctica's ice mass is lost through them.

While East Antarctica is generally stable, ice loss in West Antarctica has increased by 59% in the past 10 years and by 140% in the Antarctic peninsula. Ice streams control much of the ice sheet mass budget as they dictate the amount of discharge that comes off an ice sheet. Geomorphic features such as bathymetric troughs indicate where paleo-ice streams in Antarctica extended during the Last Glacial Maximum (LGM). Analysis of landforms diagnostic of paleo-ice streams, revealed considerable asynchronicity in individual ice stream retreat histories. This notion is important when considering how the underlying geomorphology of ice streams control at what rate and how they retreat. Furthermore, this reinforces the importance of internal factors such as bed characteristic, slope, and drainage basin size in determining ice stream dynamics.

== Greenland ==
Ice streams that drain the Greenland ice sheet into the sea include Helheim Glacier, Jakobshavn Isbræ and Kangerdlugssuaq Glacier. With significantly more surface melt, only 50% of ice mass is lost through ice streams in Greenland, but they still are one of the primary modes of ice loss. The Northeast Greenland Ice Stream, at 600 km (370 mi) long, drains roughly 12% of the entire ice sheet through three outlet glaciers. Earlier in the Holocene, the ice stream system of northeast Greenland reached much farther into Greenland's interior compared to the present day.

The northeast Greenland ice stream behaves similarly to the Ross ice streams of West Antarctica with fast flow and a weak bed with low driving stresses. The basal shear stress balances the driving stress for several hundred kilometers in the center of the ice stream. Further upstream, the initiation of the ice stream (established by looking at velocity data) is caused by a weak bed.

== Lesser Streams ==
Ice streams can also occur in ice fields that are significantly smaller than the Antarctic and Greenland ice sheets. In the Patagonian region of southern South America there are three main icefields - the North Patagonian Icefield, South Patagonian Icefield, and Cordillera Darwin Icefield that all exhibit ice streams.

Ice streams are also important for ice sheet dynamics of Iceland's ice fields. In Iceland, areas with reticulated ridges, ribbed moraines, and trunk-flow zones have demonstrated no control over the direction and magnitude of ice streams.

== Geomorphology ==
Ice streams have various impacts on the surrounding event. The most obvious one is the development of large topographic lows and valleys after an ice stream has been completely drained from the ice sheet itself. The topographic lows are formed by glacial erosion as the stream carves through the underlain material, eroding it and pushing sediment into the water beneath the ice stream and through the drainage system. These low topographic areas can be up to a few kilometers in depth, and up to hundreds of kilometers in length. The resulting low regions act as a new drainage system for the ice sheet, as it allows movement of material through topographic low to increase, since the stream has left the sheet.

Another problem arises from the discharge of the sheet through ice streams, which can be one of many factors causing small stage sheet collapse. In addition to this collapse, ice streams also act to increase the global sea level. As ice streams drain into the surrounding ocean, not only does this increase the sea level due to displacement of the ice runoff, but also by increasing the volumetric content of the oceans themselves, but this is almost negligible. As ice streams diminish in size, the pressure they exert on surrounding features like glaciers reduces, allowing the glacier that feeds into the sea to speed up and discharge more quickly, rising sea level. This rise in sea level affects both topography and bathymetry in the regions directly affected by the ice stream in question. As a result of this rise in sea level, albeit slow and almost minute in short scales but large over longer scales, the landscape will be altered. Rising sea levels will weather the surrounding sheet and cause erosion and deformation of the sheet itself, thus altering the landscape and morphology.
