= Global Apollo Programme =

The Global Apollo Programme was a historic call for a major global science and economics research programme to make carbon-free baseload electricity less costly than electricity from coal by the year 2025.

== Inspiration and aims ==
Launched in June 2015, the project - named for the Apollo Program, which brought together thousands of scientists and engineers to put mankind on the moon - called for developed nations to commit to spending 0.02% of their GDP, for 10 years, to fund co-ordinated research to solve the challenge. This equated to $150 billion over a decade, roughly the same cost committed to the Apollo Program in 2015 money. Some developed nations, including the UK, already met the GDP percentage target spend at that time, but many did not and there was little international coordination to maximise the results.

It was modelled on the International Technology Roadmap for Semiconductors, an international research collaborative that is credited with greatly and swiftly improving the quality and economics of semiconductor manufacture.

== Key areas of focus ==
- Renewable energy - in particular that derived from solar and wind sources
- Energy storage
- Smart grids
- hydrogen vehicles

== Key people ==
=== Launch report authors ===
The initiative was spearheaded by the chemist Professor Sir David King, former Government Chief Scientific Adviser to HM Government. Amongst the Apollo group were economists Professor Lord Stern (author of The Stern Review) and Lord O'Donnell (former Cabinet Secretary), businessmen Lord Turner and Lord Browne (former Chief Executive of BP), cosmologist and astrophysicist Professor Lord Rees (former President of the Royal Society) and labour economist Lord Layard.

=== Endorsers ===
The following were signatories on an open letter published to The Guardian newspaper, alongside the launch report authors, in September 2015.

- Sir David Attenborough
- Professor Brian Cox, University of Manchester
- Paul Polman, CEO of Unilever
- Ed Davey, Former UK Secretary of State for Energy and Climate Change
- Professor Sir Brian Hoskins, Chair of the Grantham Institute
- Mark Kenber, CEO of The Climate Group
- Ben Goldsmith Founder, Menhaden Capital
- Zac Goldsmith, British MP and London mayoral candidate
- Professor Martin Siegert, co-director of the Grantham Institute
- Professor Joanna Haigh, co-director, Grantham Institute; vice-president of Royal Meteorological Society
- Peter Bakker, President of the World Business Council for Sustainable Development
- Professor John Shepherd, University of Southampton
- Dr Arunabha Ghosh, Founder-CEO, Council on Energy, Environment and Water

Professor Jeffrey Sachs, Professor of Sustainable Development and Director of the Earth Institute at Columbia University separately publicly endorsed the programme.

Professor Sir David King publicly stated that Prime Minister of India Narendra Modi was "keen" on the programme.

== Reaction ==
At last - an authoritative, practical and comprehensible plan that could avert the catastrophe that is threatening our planet. — Sir David Attenborough, official launch at the Royal Society on 2 June 2015

[Research and development in renewables] should be like the Manhattan Project and the Apollo Project in the sense that the government should put in a serious amount of R&D. — Bill Gates, spearhead of Mission Innovation, 25 June 2015

We will work together and with other interested countries to raise the overall coordination and transparency of clean energy research, development and demonstration... We ask our Energy Ministers to take forward these initiatives... — Leaders of the G7, 41st G7 summit, Schloss Elmau, June 2015

Foremost, governments need to fund research and development for low-carbon energy technologies at Apollo-program levels of commitment... The required funding of this ultimate public good is too great a risk with too little a reward for private companies. But it is easily fundable by governments. — Professor Steven Pinker, Harvard University

== Key dates ==
- The programme was discussed at the Energy Ministers run-up meeting to the 41st G7 summit.
- It featured in the Leader's Declaration of the 41st G7 summit itself.

== See also ==
- Mission Innovation
- Breakthrough Energy
- Keeling Curve
