= Philippe Joubert =

French-Brazilian business executive

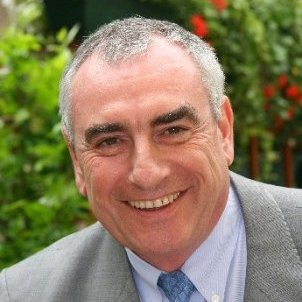
- Born: Philippe Joubert; 5 June 1954 (age 72); Saint-Étienne, France
- Education: ESSEC Business School; International Institute for Management Development; New York University
- Occupations: 1976 Secretary, Chamber of Commerce Rio de Janeiro; 1997 Country President, GEC ALSTHOM Brazil; 2000 President Alstom Transmission & Distribution; 2004 President Alstom Power; 2011 Deputy CEO Alstom Group; Since 2012 Non-Executive Director and Senior Advisor on sustainable development
- Website: fr.linkedin.com/pub/philippe-joubert/48/976/939

Philippe Joubert (born 5 June 1954 in Saint-Étienne, France), is a French Brazilian business executive.

Joubert is Founder & CEO of Earth on Board, Senior Advisor and Special Envoy for Energy and Climate for the World Business Council for Sustainable Development (WBCSD) and is the chair of the advisory board of the Cambridge Institute for Sustainability Leadership where he is a Fellow. He is also Senior Advisor for International Development at World Energy Council (WEC). He acts as an advisor to Governments and CEOs of several major global companies on sustainable development and sits on various boards and advisory boards as a Non-Executive Director. Previously, Joubert was president of Alstom Power and Deputy-CEO of Alstom Group and Chair of the Prince of Wales’s Corporate Leaders Group

== Early life and education ==
Philippe Joubert was born in Saint-Étienne in France. Joubert graduated from ESSEC Business School where he majored in Finance and Economy, and served as Assistant to the Finance Professor. Thereafter, he took courses in New York University, the IMD (International Institute for Management Development), and Schumacher College.

After graduating from ESSEC Business School, Joubert began his career in 1976 as Secretary for the Chamber of Commerce in Rio de Janeiro, Brazil. Between 1977 and 1982, he held various positions in Brazilian bank BFB, part of Crédit Lyonnais; in 1983, he moved to the USA where he was promoted to Commercial Vice-president of Crédit Lyonnais USA.

== Earth on Board ==
Philippe is founder and CEO of Earth on Board, a group comprising members from CISL, WBCSD, CDP, We Mean Business, Client Earth and The B Team. The education element of the ecosystem is built and offered in partnership with Cambridge Institute for Sustainability Leadership.

== Alstom ==
Joubert joined Alstom in 1986, as finance director of GEC ALSTHOM Mecanica Pesada in Brazil. In 1991, he was appointed president & CEO of GEC ALSTHOM Mecanica Pesada, and additionally, in 1992, general delegate of GEC ALSTHOM in Brazil. In 1997, he became country president, GEC ALSTHOM Brazil.

In 2000, he was appointed president of Alstom's Transmission & Distribution Sector (product and solutions for transmission and distribution networks, with 3.2bn € sales, 25 000 employees in 70 countries) and member of the Alstom Group Executive Committee in France. He ran this business until its divestment in January 2004.

In February 2004, he became executive Vice-president of Alstom, Member of the executive committee, as well as president of Power Systems Sector. He also was in charge of Alstom's International Network.

In March 2009, he was appointed president of the newly formed Alstom Power Sector, resulting from the merger of all the activities related to power generation regrouping Power Systems (integrated plants, equipments and retrofit) and Power Service (after-sales, from service to renovation and spare parts). Alstom Power, a world leader in turnkey power plants, equipments and services for all energy sources including thermal (gas, steam, nuclear) and renewable (hydro, wind, solar), represented 60% of Alstom Group's activities. With 47000 employees in 60 countries and €12 billion in sales, it was by far the biggest contributor to Group's cash and profits.

On July 4, 2011, Philippe Joubert was appointed deputy chief executive officer of Alstom, and put in charge of Strategy & Development for the Group (covering its Power, Grid and Transport sectors), as well as of Environment & Sustainability. He was also responsible for Alstom's International Network of Country Presidents, as well as for the Group's Asian development.

During Joubert's tenure at Alstom as president for Alstom Power, he introduced and championed the Group's 'Clean Power Today' strategy, focused on:

- Balancing the power generation portfolio by significantly increasing the share of CO_{2}-free technologies
- Maximizing production efficiency and flexibility for both existing and new plants
- Applying carbon capture and storage technologies to fossil fuel power production

On Feb 1, 2012, he resigned from his mandate, left Alstom's operations and became Advisor to the Chairman & CEO for Environment and sustainable development matters.

== Sustainable development ==
In May 2012, the World Business Council for Sustainable Development (WBCSD) appointed Joubert as Senior Advisor.

Today, Joubert is founder and CEO of Earth On Board, senior advisor and special envoy for Energy and Climate for the World Business Council for Sustainable Development and is chair of the advisory board of the Cambridge Institute for Sustainability Leadership where he is a Fellow. He is also an International Advisor to World Energy Council (WEC) and was formerly the executive chairman of the Global Electricity Initiative Joubert is also a trustee of Client Earth and Member of the advisory board of A4S (Accounting for Sustainability).

He acts as an advisor to governments and CEOs of several major global companies and sits on various boards and advisory boards as a Non-Executive Director; including as a Member of Sustainability Committee of the Board of Suzano Pulp and Paper and the board of Voltalia, where he is also a member of the Audit Committee.

Previously, Joubert has held roles including chair of the Prince of Wales’s EU Corporate Leaders Group on Climate Change in Brussels, board member and President of Strategy and Sustainability Committee of Nexans, board member of Nexans South America and Non-Exec Director of Electricity of Cameroun.

In December 2014, Joubert presented at United Nations Climate Change conference COP20 in Lima, Peru, the Global Electricity Initiative (GEI) report that identifies the untapped opportunities for electricity utilities to further deliver a low-carbon future.

== Leadership ==
Philippe is a regular keynote speaker and moderator of international round tables in the areas of Low Carbon Economy, Energy and Climate, Net Zero, Carbon Capture and Storage, Sustainable Infrastructure and Sustainable Cities, Energy and Water Nexus and Post-COP21 emergence of a new business model, which takes into account natural and social capital and calls for new governance system, starting at the level of the Board's fiduciary duties.

Philippe's leadership and opinions are regularly covered in mainstream, business and industry media; including the Economist, South China Morning Post, Huffington Post, Nikkei, L’Express, CNBC Africa, VICE Impact, De Standaard, BusinessGreen, edie and EcoBusiness.

Philippe also has a social media following on Twitter and LinkedIn and has written guest blogs for a number of news outlets including Huffington Post, Swiss Re's OpenMinds platform and Business Green.
