= Horse latitudes =

Latitudes 30–35 degrees north and south of the Equator

A diagram showing the relative positions of the horse latitudes

The horse latitudes are the latitudes about 30 degrees north and south of the equator. They are characterized by sunny skies, calm winds, and very little precipitation. They are also known as subtropical ridges or highs. It is a high-pressure area at the divergence of trade winds and the westerlies.

== Etymology ==
A likely and documented explanation is that the term is derived from the "dead horse" ritual of seamen. In this practice, the seaman paraded a straw-stuffed effigy of a horse around the deck before throwing it overboard. Seamen were paid partly in advance before a long voyage, and they frequently spent their pay all at once, resulting in a period of time without income. This period was called the "dead horse" time, and it usually lasted a month or two. The seaman's ceremony was to celebrate having worked off the "dead horse" debt. As west-bound shipping from Europe usually reached the subtropics at about the time the "dead horse" was worked off, the latitude became associated with the ceremony.

An alternative theory, of sufficient popularity to serve as an example of folk etymology, is that the term horse latitudes originates from when the Spanish transported horses by ship to their colonies in the West Indies and Americas. Ships often became becalmed in mid-ocean in this latitude, thus severely prolonging the voyage; the resulting water shortages made it impossible for the crew to keep the horses alive, and they would throw the dead or dying animals overboard.

A third explanation, which simultaneously explains both the northern and southern horse latitudes and does not depend on the length of the voyage or the port of departure, is based on maritime terminology: a ship was said to be 'horsed' when, although there was insufficient wind for sail, the vessel could make good progress by latching on to a strong current. This was suggested by Edward Taube in his article "The Sense of 'Horse' in the Horse Latitudes". He argued the maritime use of 'horsed' described a ship that was being carried along by an ocean current or tide in the manner of a carriage pulled by a horse. The term had been in use since the end of the seventeenth century. Furthermore, The India Directory in its entry for Fernando de Noronha, an island off the coast of Brazil, mentions it had been visited frequently by ships "occasioned by the currents having horsed them to the westward".

A further explanation is that this naming may have first appeared in an English translation of a hypothetical German book where Rossbreiten was incorrectly understood as Pferdbreiten. The 'Ross latitudes' were named after the Englishman who described them first but could have been mistranslated, as Pferd and Ross are German synonyms for a horse. An incorrect translation could therefore have produced the term "horse latitudes".

== Formation ==
The heating of the earth at the thermal equator leads to large amounts of convection along the Intertropical Convergence Zone. This air mass rises and then diverges, moving away from the equator in both northerly and southerly directions. As the air moves towards the mid-latitudes on both sides of the equator, it cools and sinks. This creates a ridge of high pressure near the 30th parallel in both hemispheres. At the surface level, the sinking air diverges again with some returning to the equator, creating the Hadley cell which during summer is reinforced by other climatological mechanisms such as the Rodwell–Hoskins mechanism. Many of the world's deserts are caused by these climatological high-pressure areas.

The subtropical ridge moves poleward during the summer, reaching its highest latitude in early autumn, before moving back during the cold season. The El Niño–Southern Oscillation (ENSO) can displace the northern hemisphere subtropical ridge, with La Niña allowing for a more northerly axis for the ridge, while El Niños show flatter, more southerly ridges. The change of the ridge position during ENSO cycles changes the tracks of tropical cyclones that form around their equatorward and western peripheries. As the subtropical ridge varies in position and strength, it can enhance or depress monsoon regimes around their low-latitude periphery.

The horse latitudes are associated with the subtropical anticyclone. The belt in the Northern Hemisphere is sometimes called the "calms of Cancer" and that in the Southern Hemisphere the "calms of Capricorn".

The consistently warm, dry, and sunny conditions of the horse latitudes are the main cause for the existence of the world's major hot deserts, such as the Sahara Desert in Africa, the Arabian and Syrian deserts in the Middle East, the Mojave desert in the Southwestern United States, and the Sonoran desert in the North of Mexico, all of which are in the Northern Hemisphere, as well as the Atacama Desert on the Pacific coast of South America, the Namib and Kalahari deserts in Southern Africa, and the Great Australian Desert on the Australian mainland, all of which are in the Southern Hemisphere.

== Migration ==
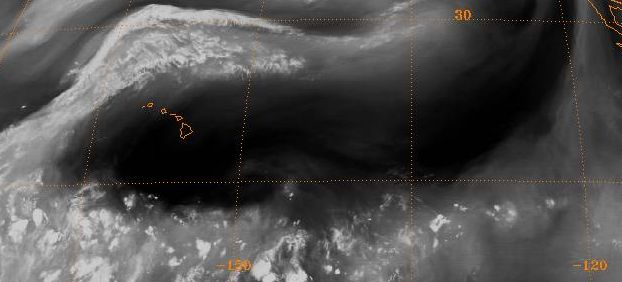
The subtropical ridge shows up as a large area of black (dryness) on this water vapor satellite image from September 2000.

The subtropical ridge starts migrating poleward in late spring reaching its zenith in early autumn before retreating equatorward during the late fall, winter, and early spring. The equatorward migration of the subtropical ridge during the cold season is due to increasing north-south temperature differences between the poles and tropics. The latitudinal movement of the subtropical ridge is strongly correlated with the progression of the monsoon trough or Intertropical Convergence Zone.

Most tropical cyclones form on the side of the subtropical ridge closer to the equator, then move poleward past the ridge axis before recurving into the main belt of the Westerlies. When the subtropical ridge shifts due to ENSO, so will the preferred tropical cyclone tracks. Areas west of Japan and Korea tend to experience far fewer September–November tropical cyclone impacts during El Niño and neutral years, while mainland China experiences much greater landfall frequency during La Niña years. During El Niño years, the break in the subtropical ridge tends to lie near 130°E, which would favor the Japanese archipelago, while in La Niña years the formation of tropical cyclones, along with the subtropical ridge position, shift west, which increases the threat to China. In the Atlantic basin, the subtropical ridge position tends to lie about 5 degrees farther south during El Niño years, which leads to a more southerly recurvature for tropical cyclones during those years.

When the Atlantic multidecadal oscillation's mode is favorable to tropical cyclone development (1995–present), it amplifies the subtropical ridge across the central and eastern Atlantic.

== Role in weather formation and air quality ==
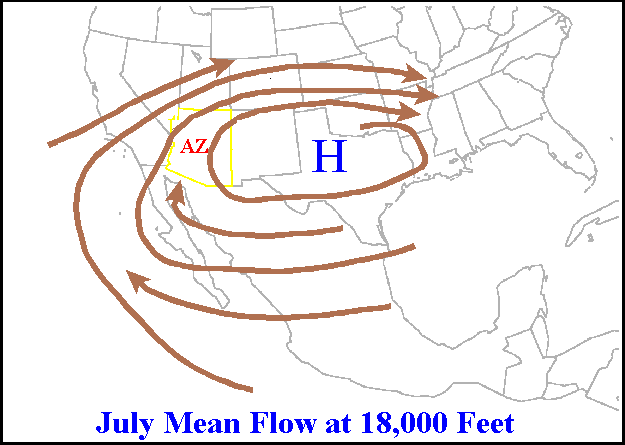
Mean July subtropical ridge position

When the subtropical ridge in the northwest Pacific is stronger than normal, it leads to a wet monsoon season for Asia. The subtropical ridge position is linked to how far northward monsoon moisture and thunderstorms extend into the United States. The subtropical ridge across North America typically migrates far enough northward to begin monsoon conditions across the Desert Southwest from July to September. When the subtropical ridge is farther north than normal towards the Four Corners, monsoon thunderstorms can spread northward into Arizona. When the high pressure moves south, its circulation cuts off the moisture, and the hot, dry continental airmass returns from the northwest, and therefore the atmosphere dries out across the Desert Southwest, causing a break in the monsoon regime.

In summer, on the subtropical ridge's western edge (generally on the eastern coast of continents), the high-pressure cell pushes poleward a southerly flow (northerly in the southern hemisphere) of tropical air. In the United States, the subtropical ridge Bermuda High helps create the hot, sultry summers with daily thunderstorms with buoyant airmasses typical of the Gulf of Mexico and the East Coast of the United States. This flow pattern also occurs on the eastern coasts of continents in other subtropical climates such as southern China, southern Japan, the central-eastern South American Pampas, southern Queensland, and the KwaZulu-Natal province in South Africa.

When surface winds become light, the subsidence produced directly under the subtropical ridge can lead to a buildup of particulates in urban areas under the ridge, leading to widespread haze. If the low-level relative humidity rises towards 100 percent overnight, fog can form.

== See also ==
- Atmospheric circulation
- Circle of latitude
- Intertropical Convergence Zone
- Polar front
- Roaring Forties
- Sataspes
