= LooLa Adventure Resort =

Indonesian resort hotel

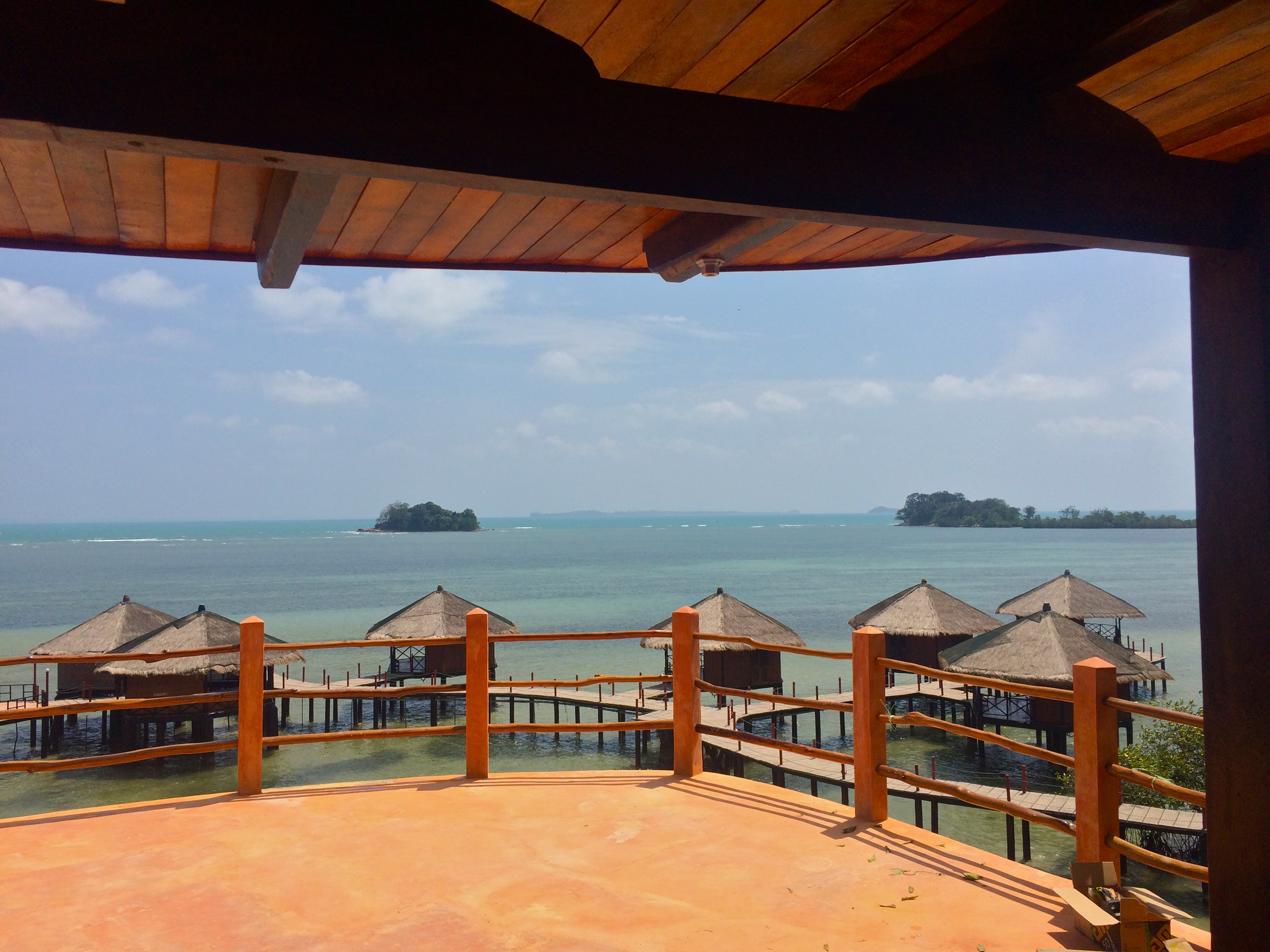
- View from Isa villa

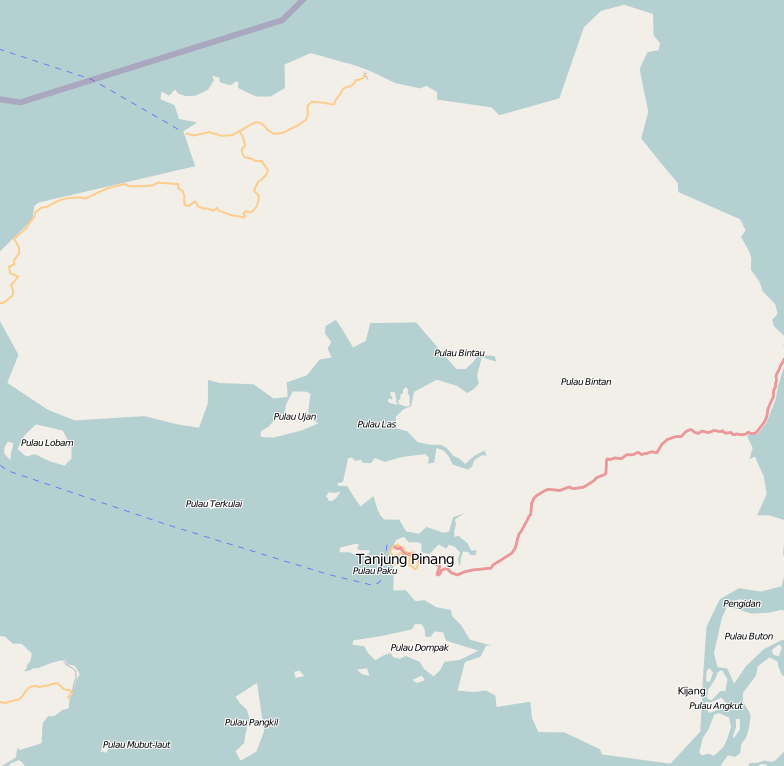
- Location in Indonesia

General information
- Location: Bintan, Riau Islands, Indonesia
- Coordinates: 0.9417°N 104.6567°E
- Opening: August 1999

LooLa Adventure Resort is a resort in southeast Bintan, Indonesia. It was established in August 1999 by Dr. Marc van Loo and Isabelle Lacoste and uses local materials.

== Eco tourism for schools ==
In 2001 it became part of the Eco tourism scheme which has been developed by Singapore nationals in Bintan. The resort holds weekly camps for school children over seven weeks during the summer break. The attendees are largely students from Singapore's international and local schools. Outdoor and water activities are held, and the resort has its own zoo. Attendance at the resort dropped significantly in the mid-2010s following the Sabah earthquake which killed seven students, two teachers and a tour guide, with concerns about safety in outdoor activities.

One of its partners is Focus Adventure, which was responsible for 200 employees visiting the resort as part of a Corporate social responsibility (CSR) project. In 2012 LooLa was a recipient of the WildAsia Responsible Tourism Award for Asia's most inspiring responsible tourism operation. In 2015 the resort was the Overall Winner at the Responsible Tourism Awards in London, and also won the Gold Award for the World's best beach destination.

== Safe Water Garden development ==
Marc van Loo built a Safe Water Garden (SWG) at the resort, which is an efficient system for reusing waste water. It is being used as a business model for water supply and improving sanitation elsewhere in Bintan and Indonesia. Loo is collaborating with Constant van Aerschot, executive director of the Business Council for Sustainable Development (BCSD) in Singapore, to broaden the initiative to villages in wider Indonesia.
