= Mobility 2030 =

Mobility 2030 is the name of two different transport plans:

- Mobility 2030 (WBCSD), of the World Business Council for Sustainable Development
