= Rodwell–Hoskins mechanism =

Climate theory

The Rodwell–Hoskins mechanism is a hypothesis describing a climatic teleconnection between the Indian/Asian summer monsoon and the climate of the Mediterranean. It was formulated in 1996 by Brian Hoskins and Mark J. Rodwell [d]. The hypothesis stipulates that ascending air in the monsoon region induces atmospheric circulation features named Rossby waves that expand westward and interact with the mean westerly winds of the midlatitudes, eventually inducing descent of the air. Descending air warms and its humidity decreases, thus resulting in a drier climate during the summer months. The interaction of this atmospheric flow with topography (e.g the Atlas and Zagros mountains) further modifies the effect.

This hypothesis has been advanced to explain the dry climate of the eastern Mediterranean during the summer months, as other explanations involving the Hadley circulation are not plausible during that season. Together with sea and land surface feedbacks, it may also explain the existence of deserts and subtropical anticyclones elsewhere in the world, as well as changes in the Mediterranean climate that coincide with variations of the monsoon.

== Theory ==
The existence of the subtropical anticyclones and of deserts in the subtropics used to be attributed to the descent of air in the Hadley cell, which reduces its humidity. This descent occurs as the air cools through radiation and the energy loss is balanced by adiabatic heating. The lack of vegetation due to the dryness increases the albedo of the ground and thus the cooling, acting as a positive feedback. Air-sea interactions, in particular the upwelling of cold waters east of the subtropical anticyclones induced by their winds and the resulting impediment to convection performs the same role over the oceans.

However, the Hadley cell is weak during the summer months when the anticyclones still exist and dryness often reaches its peak in the deserts. In 1996, Mark J. Rodwell and Brian J. Hoskins proposed that instead, a Gill-type response to the Asian monsoon induces a Rossby wave response to the west which triggers descent west of the monsoon. This involves similar processes as the Hadley cell theory, but east–west horizontal advection modifies the energy balance, focusing descent at certain longitudes, unlike in equatorial regions where horizontal advection is less important. The descending air does not originate in the monsoonal regions, thus it is not a Walker circulation; rather, it originates in the mid-latitude westerlies and descends along atmospheric isentropes. In the Rodwell and Hoskins 1996 simulation, the location of the descent is controlled by orography just west of the descending region; heating over the topography induces anticyclonic (clockwise) flow and thus southward movement of cold air to its east, although the direction of the mean wind modulates the longitude direction of the forcing. The Etesian winds over Greece can be interpreted as the southward flow linked to the Rossby wave. In 2019, Ossó et al. showed that coupled sea surface temperature responses are important in inducing the descent west of the eastern Mediterranean as otherwise the Indian monsoon is located too far south to induce the Rossby wave response.

Later research has indicated that the Rodwell–Hoskins mechanism can be induced by monsoons other than the Indian monsoon. For example, the South American monsoon may induce subsidence in the Southeastern Pacific and on the western slope of the Andes, and the North Pacific High may be a product of the North American monsoon. The subtropical anticyclones are subsequently strengthened by cooling over the oceans and cloud feedbacks, and according to Miyasaka and Nakamura 2005 by solar (sensible) heating of the dry landmass under the descent region. Thus, the Rodwell–Hoskins mechanism may play a role over most of the global subtropics and tropics, especially over the Mediterranean where the subtropical anticyclones are less influential than in other Mediterranean climates. It may play a lesser role in Southern Hemisphere anticyclone dynamics according to Seager et al. 2003, and only a minor role in intensifying the North Pacific High.

According to Kelly and Mapes 2013, in the Community Atmosphere Model a strong Asian monsoon can extend the Rodwell–Hoskins mechanism to North America, resulting in drying of the western Atlantic. Smaller scale features such as the Thar Desert may also result from this mechanism.

=== Evidence ===
In June to August, ascent occurs over Africa and Asia, with centres over the northern Bay of Bengal and equatorial Africa. Descent occurs to the west of the Asian monsoon, that is over the Kyzylkum Desert, the eastern Mediterranean including southeastern Europe and eastern Sahara, and in the eastern Atlantic. The longitude of the descent is connected to the underlying orography of the Zagros and Atlas Mountains, and summer precipitation is negligible in the descent areas. The Rodwell–Hoskins mechanism appears to be less important for the Arabian Desert, where the cooling through radiation and subsequent descent may instead be the key factor.

The "monsoon-desert" mechanism has been identified both in climate reanalyses, idealized simulations and climate models. Other phenomena linked to the Rodwell–Hoskins mechanism are:

- Oxygen isotope variations in corals of the northern Red Sea appear to correlate with the intensity of the Indian Monsoon.
- Near East atmospheric circulation changes are synchronous with the monsoon.
- After the onset of the Indian monsoon, dry air intrusions cause fluctuations in the intensity of the African monsoon, including a temporary weakening of precipitation.

== Implications ==
The intensity of the Rodwell–Hoskins mechanism is a function of the latitude of the monsoon; ascent close to the equator (such as during the pre-monsoon season) does not induce it effectively. According to Rodwell and Hoskins 2001, the African monsoon being a tropical monsoon does not induce a substantial Rodwell–Hoskins effect.

The air forced to descend by the Rodwell–Hoskins mechanism can in turn flow into the convergence zones of the monsoon region and alter the monsoon behaviour; this is known as the "interactive Rodwell–Hoskins mechanism" and it reduces the precipitation in the western sector of a monsoon by importing dry/low energy air into the monsoon region. It appears to play a role in restricting the westward extent of the North American monsoon, inducing dryness along the West Coast, and likewise in limiting the southward extent of the South American monsoon. The monsoon-desert mechanism is variable on timescales of a few weeks.

Enomoto 2003 recognized that the descent forced by the Rodwell–Hoskins mechanism over the Mediterranean and Aral Sea coincide with the "inlet" region of the Asian jet stream and consequently Rossby waves could enter the jet stream through these regions ("Silk Road pattern"). Enomoto 2004 proposed that the Rossby waves travelling through this jet stream eventually accumulate over Japan and induce the formation of a second anticyclone there – a process they called the "Monsoon-Desert-Jet mechanism" and which they suggested may induce heat waves in Japan. This structure of the atmospheric circulation has also been described by other researchers. Additionally, vorticity anomalies originating directly from the monsoon outflow may enter into the jet stream as Rossby waves.

Di Capua et al. 2020 noted that La Niña in the Pacific Ocean boosts the monsoon-desert mechanism through a coupling with the Walker circulation. Wu and Shaw 2016 proposed that the Rodwell–Hoskins mechanism alters the potential temperature of the tropopause by shifting the monsoon-related warmest points.

=== Paleoclimate ===
The strength of the Rodwell–Hoskins-induced descent is a function of the strength of the monsoon. Thus, climate variability impacting monsoon intensity can alter the descent as well. Through the Rodwell–Hoskins mechanism, the development of the Tibetan Plateau during the Cretaceous to Eocene and its effect on the Indian monsoon may have had remote effects on Africa and the Mediterranean, and the same mechanism may be responsible for the drying of northwestern India between 11–7 million years ago. Vice versa, the existence of North America as a continent influences the Asian monsoon through the Rodwell–Hoskins mechanism. The climate effects of the Rodwell–Hoskins mechanism may have influenced the oceanic climate during the existence and breakup of Pangea in the last 250 million years.

When precession (a key Milankovitch cycle) and global ice cover reach their lowest values, an intensified Indian monsoon may induce a more intense summer drought over the eastern Mediterranean, although increased autumn/winter rainfall may negate the drying. An anticorrelation between wetter Northern Hemisphere monsoons during the Holocene and drier subtropics may also be explained by the Rodwell–Hoskins effect, as is drying in Oman and the Near East during the Medieval Climate Anomaly and the Early Holocene. Conversely, wetter subtropics during the Pliocene may thus relate to decreased rainfall over the eastern Indian Ocean and the Bay of Bengal.

=== Climate variability ===
Phenomena associated with the Rodwell–Hoskins effect include:

- Teleconnections associated with the Indian Ocean Dipole (IOD), in particular the development of Rossby wave trains. A positive IOD would tend to intensify the monsoon and the Rodwell–Hoskins mechanism while a negative IOD would tend to weaken them.
- During years where the monsoon is unusually wet over Arizona, the Great Plains, Midcontinent and Pacific Northwest are unusually dry.
- Monsoon breaks in India and the low level temperature inversion over the Arabian Sea.
- When the Indian monsoon is weaker, e.g. after the 1912 Mount Katmai eruption, cloudiness and precipitation increase over the Mediterranean.
- Volcanic eruptions resulting in wetter climates over the dry regions.
- The wet summers 2002 and 2014 in Southern Europe when the Indian monsoon was weaker than normal.
- Bollasina and Nigam 2011 proposed that the subsidence northwest of the Hindu Kush interacts with the topography to produce the Indo-Pakistani heat low.
- Yang 2021 proposed that the Sahel drought stemmed from an intensified Rodwell–Hoskins descent over Africa and ended when warming Atlantic sea surface temperatures decreased the temperature difference between Africa and Asia.
- Anticorrelations between Middle East precipitation and the Asian monsoon.
- Maximum temperatures occur in the northern Arabian Peninsula.
- Dipole-like precipitation errors in certain climate models.
- The development of tropical upper-tropospheric troughs over the Northern Hemisphere oceans in summer.
- Increased precipitation in the eastern Mediterranean after sulfate aerosol release.
- Correlations between monsoon biases on the Indian Ocean and India, and climate biases over Africa.
- Xiang et al. 2023 suggested that aerosol-driven decreases in the Indian monsoon increase rainfall over the Sahel and central Africa.
- Increased drought occurrence in the mid-latitudes of the Northern Hemisphere due to increased monsoon activity.

Atmospheric waves similar to these of the Rodwell–Hoskins mechanism are also found in climate simulations where the monsoons have been modified by vegetation changes induced through man-made carbon dioxide increases or increased condensational heating. They may play a role in altering European climate according to Douville et al. 2000 and Gregory, Mitchell and Brady 1997, such as causing drying in the Mediterranean. Studying the output of some climate models, Cherchi et al. 2016 found both increased descent and a westward shift of the descent in response to increased monsoon precipitation during the 21st century.

== Alternative processes ==
- Chen et al. 2001 proposed that upstream monsoon heating can induce Rossby waves that generate the subtropical anticyclones through an eastward-directed forcing, the opposite direction from the westward-directed Rodwell–Hoskins hypothesis. According to Chen et al. 2022 however, this process does not explain the structure of the summer atmospheric circulation.
- A Hadley cell-like interaction between the Mediterranean and the African monsoon intensifies Mediterranean drought.
- Eastward propagating Kelvin waves can induce descent to the east of the monsoon region, which is important in inducing the North Pacific High in response to the Asian and the South Atlantic High regarding the South American monsoon and are also connected to the low-level inflow of moisture into the monsoons.
