= Mission Innovation =

- Founded: 2015
- Type: Global alliance
- Purpose: Clean energy R&D
- Region served: Worldwide
- Website: mission-innovation.net

Mission Innovation is a global initiative to accelerate public and private clean energy innovation to address climate change, make clean energy affordable to consumers, and create green jobs and commercial opportunities.

== History ==
Mission Innovation was announced at COP21 on 30 November 2015 by President Obama of the United States, on behalf of the founding Governments. At the same time Bill Gates launched Breakthrough Energy. Also on stage for the launch was President Hollande of France and Prime Minister Modi of India.

At the launch, 20 countries committed to double their respective clean energy research and development over the five years to 2020. For the US Department of Energy, this translates into an additional $4 billion by the end of 2020. The countries include the five most populous (as at 2015): China, India, the United States, Indonesia, and Brazil. All 20 launch partner countries represent 75 percent of the world's CO_{2} emissions from electricity, and over 80 percent of the world's clean energy R&D investment.

Scientists, academics, and officials who had called for a Global Apollo Programme earlier in 2015 commented that the group should set a specific target to make clean electricity cheaper to produce than coal, preferably by 2025.

== Technology focus ==
In November 2016, the member governments agreed to co-ordinate their efforts around seven "Innovation Challenges," and added an eighth Innovation Challenge in 2018. They are:

- Smart grids
- Off-grid access to electricity
- Carbon capture
- Sustainable biofuels
- Converting sunlight into solar fuels
- Clean energy materials to sequester carbon in useful materials
- Affordable heating & cooling of buildings
- Renewable and clean hydrogen

== Participating countries ==
The following are founder members:

- Australia
- Brazil
- Canada
- Chile
- China
- Denmark
- France
- Germany
- India
- Indonesia
- Italy
- Japan
- Republic of Korea
- Mexico
- Netherlands
- Norway
- Saudi Arabia
- United Arab Emirates
- United Kingdom
- United States

== See also ==
- Breakthrough Energy
- Global Apollo Programme
- International Energy Agency
- International Renewable Energy Agency
- World Economic Forum
