= Brian Hoskins =

British climatologist (born 1945)

Sir Brian Hoskins CBE FRS
- Born: 17 May 1945 (age 81); England
- Education: University of Cambridge (B.A., 1966) (PhD, 1970)
- Awards: The Chree Medal and Prize 1987; Vilhelm Bjerknes Medal 1997
- Scientific career
- Workplaces: University of Reading; Imperial College London
- Thesis: Atmospheric frontogenesis (1970)
- Doctoral advisor: Francis P. Bretherton

Professor Sir Brian John Hoskins (born 17 May 1945) is a British dynamical meteorologist and climatologist based at the Imperial College London and the University of Reading. He is a recipient of the 2024 Japan Prize along with Professor John Michael Wallace in the field of "Resources, Energy, the Environment, and Social Infrastructure" for "Establishment of a scientific foundation for understanding and predicting extreme weather events". He is a mathematician by training, his research has focused on understanding atmospheric motion from the scale of fronts to that of the Earth, using a range of theoretical and numerical models. He is perhaps best known for his work on the mathematical theory of extratropical cyclones and frontogenesis, particularly through the use of potential vorticity. He has also produced research across many areas of meteorology, including the Indian monsoon and global warming, recently contributing to the Stern review and the IPCC Fourth Assessment Report.

In 1996, he and the meteorologist Mark J. Rodwell [d], formulated the Rodwell–Hoskins mechanism hypothesis on the climatic teleconnection between the Indian/Asian summer monsoon and the climate of the Mediterranean.

== Career ==
Hoskins gained a B.A. (1st Class Honors) and PhD in mathematics from the University of Cambridge, UK, in 1966 and 1970, respectively. He was then Reader in atmospheric modelling (1976–1981) and professor of meteorology (1981–present) at the University of Reading. He was Head of the Department of Meteorology (1990–1996) at the University of Reading and President of the Royal Meteorological Society (1998–2000). He was a Royal Society council member (1999–present) and research professor (2001–present) and the first Director of the Grantham Institute for Climate Change at Imperial College London (2008–2014).

Hoskins has spoken on behalf for the use of meteorology in government, industry and society. He was also part of establishing the Grantham Institute for Climate Change at Imperial College London, an international centre for climate change research. He has been Council member for the Natural Environment Research Council that funds and supports most of the environmental research in the UK, and has held numerous roles for the Met Office, most recently as non-executive director and Chairman of the Scientific Advisory Board.

He has made contributions to the Intergovernmental Panel on Climate Change scientific assessments. He contributed to the Stern review of the economics of climate change and was also a member of the Royal Commission on Environmental Pollution which recommended that the UK should aim for a 60% reduction in emissions of carbon dioxide by 2050. He was appointed to the UK Committee on Climate Change, which has been influential in the Government's decision to commit to an 80 percent reduction in greenhouse gas emissions by 2050.

== Awards ==
- Japan Prize 2024
- Bjerknes Lecture, American Geophysical Union (2014)
- Knighthood (2007)
- Symons Gold Medal (2006) of the Royal Meteorological Society
- Elected to the US National Academy of Sciences (2002)
- Commander of the Most Excellent Order of the British Empire (1998)
- Honorary Professor of the Chinese Academy of Sciences (1998)
- EGS Vilhelm Bjerknes Medallist (1997)
- Fellow of the Royal Society (1988)
- Carl-Gustaf Rossby Research Medal (1988) from the American Meteorological Society
- The Chree Medal and Prize of the Institute of Physics (1987)
- Fellow of the American Meteorological Society (1985)
- L.F. Richardson Prize (1972) and Buchan Prize (1976) from the Royal Meteorological Society

== Service ==
- President, Royal Meteorological Society 1998–2000
- Member, Royal Commission on Environmental Pollution
- President, International Association of Meteorology and Atmospheric Sciences 1991–95
- Chair, Royal Society Global Environmental Research Committee
- Chair, Meteorological Office Science Advisory Committee and Member, Meteorological Office Board
- Vice-Chair, Joint Scientific Committee for the World Climate Research Programme
- Member, Scientific Advisory Committee for European Centre for Medium-Range Weather Forecasts (Chair 1985–88)
