= Fervo Energy =

Geothermal energy company

- Type: Private
- Industry: Alternative energy; Renewable energy
- Founded: 2017; 9 years ago
- Founders: Tim Latimer and Dr. Jack Norbeck
- Headquarters: Houston, Texas, U.S.
- Products: Geothermal power; Energy recovery
- Website: fervoenergy.com

Fervo Energy is a geothermal company based in Houston, Texas, that generates electricity through enhanced geothermal systems (EGS). Fervo Energy was co-founded in 2017 by CEO Tim Latimer, a mechanical engineer who worked as a drilling engineer at BHP until 2015, and CTO Jack Norbeck.

In 2023, Fervo Energy announced that its first commercial pilot geothermal plant, Project Red, was successful in generating three megawatt of baseload power and consistently maintained flow rates of 60 litres (16 US gal) per second. It is also developing Cape Station, the company's first multi-phased greenfield geothermal development.

== Financing ==
In 2021, Fervo Energy signed a 115 megawatt power purchase agreement with NV Energy to supply carbon-free baseload electricity for Google's data centers in Nevada. The agreement was enabled through NV Energy’s Clean Transition Tariff, which was described as a first-of-its-kind rate structure to support carbon-free energy investment.

Fervo Energy has been backed by over $1.5 billion in equity, debt and grant funding. In November 2025, Fervo Energy received $462 million of Series E funding, led by B Capital, with participation from returning investors including Breakthrough Energy, Centaurus Capital, and Congruent Ventures, among others.

Fervo Energy has supported the development of Cape Station through long-term power purchase agreements. The company has announced agreements to supply carbon-free baseload electricity from Cape Station customers, including Southern California Edison (SCE), Clean Power Alliance (CPA), as well as other offtakers. In April 2025, Fervo announced that it has contracted to sell 31 megawatts of power to Shell Energy North America.

== Projects & developments ==
=== Project Red ===
On July 18, 2023, Fervo Energy announced the completion of its first geothermal plant in Nevada. Known as Project Red, it was the first use of horizontal wells in an EGS system and was designed to demonstrate the technical and commercial viability of adapting horizontal drilling techniques for geothermal development. The two wells attained a true vertical depth of 8,000 feet (2,400 m), with horizontal laterals extending roughly 3,250 feet (990 m). The geothermal gradient measured approximately 75°C per kilometer and the plant attained flow rates of up to 63 litres (17 US gal) per second and generated 3.5 megawatt of baseload electricity.

=== Cape Station development ===
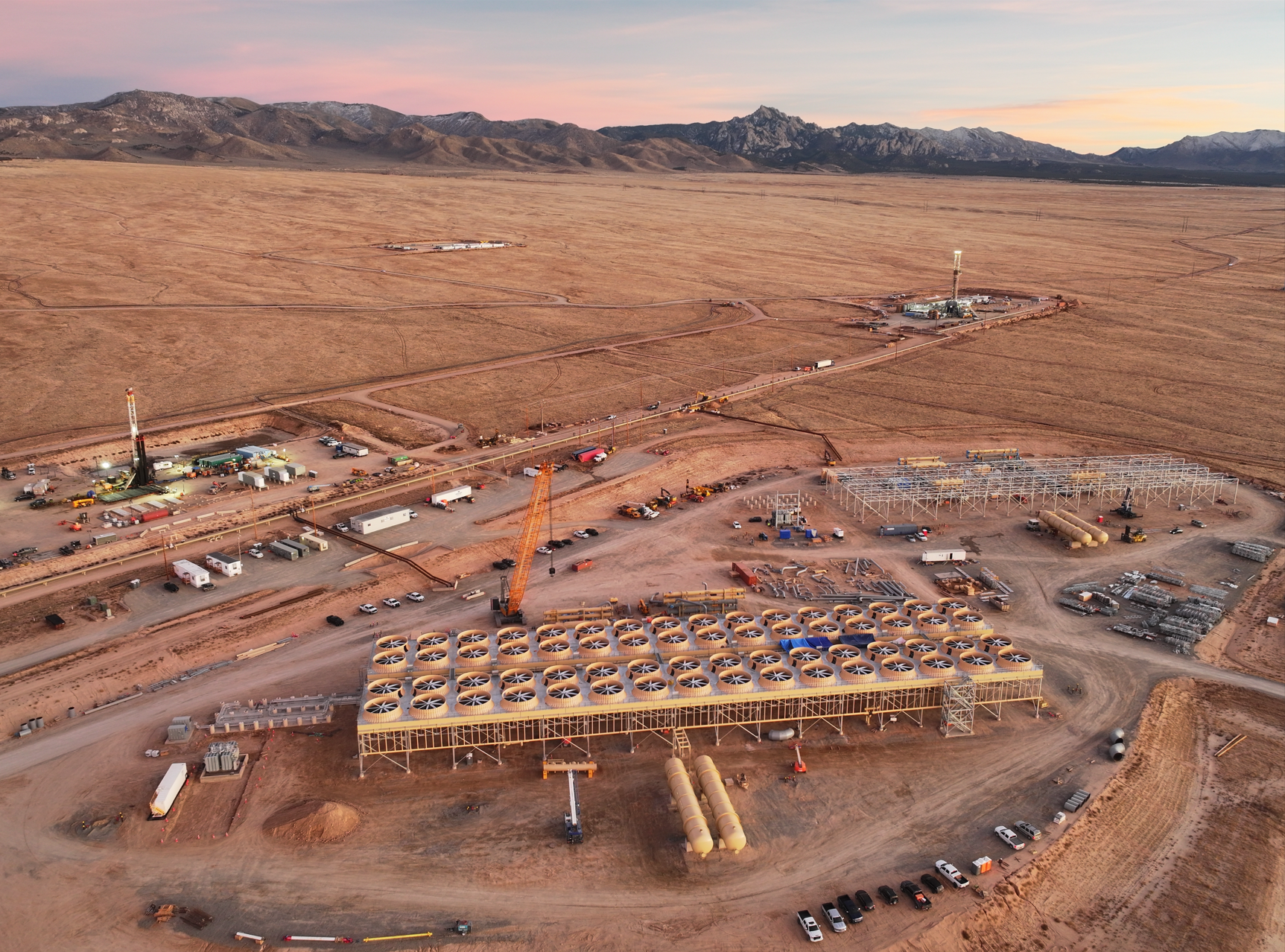
Cape Station Construction, December 2025.

On September 25, 2023, Fervo held its groundbreaking ceremony for its Cape Station development outside Milford, Utah. Fervo estimates that the plant has the potential to generate up to 500 megawatts of electrical power with permits allowing to scale up to 2 gigawatts. Lateral well lengths were proposed to be increased to beyond 10,000 feet (3,000 m). Drilling was conducted in hard metasedimentary and igneous formations.

Cape Station is expected reach 400 megawatts of capacity. In October 2026, the initial 33-megawatt unit began producing power for sale. The first customer is Shell Energy.

=== Upcoming projects ===
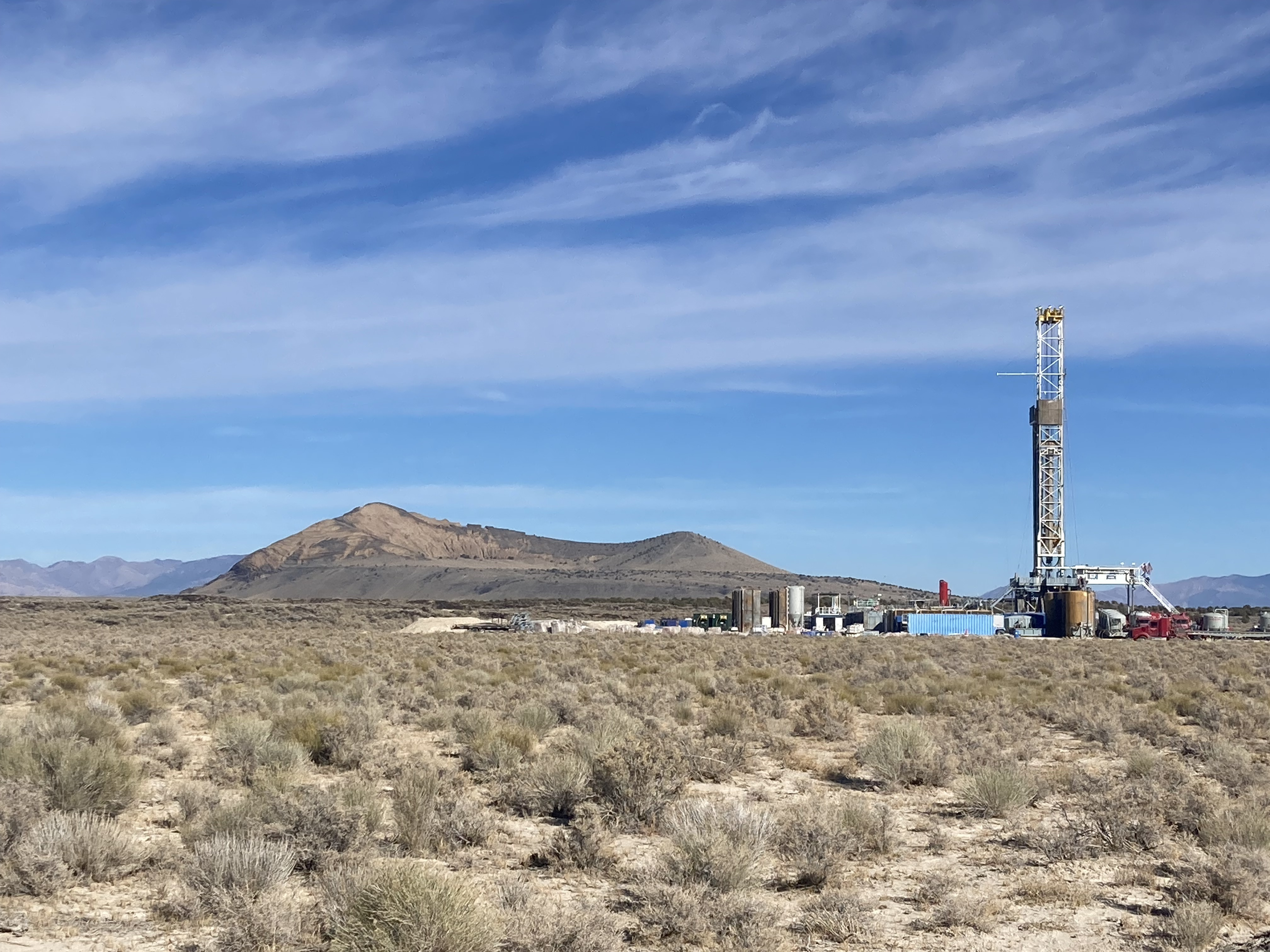
Appraisal Rig at Project Blanford

The Corsac Station Enhanced Geothermal Project is a planned project in northern Nevada, supported by a 115 megawatt power purchase agreement with NV Energy to serve Google's Nevada data center operations.
