= Ormiston Sudbury Academy =

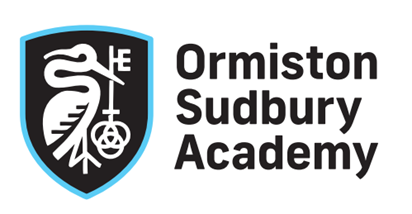

Location
- Tudor Road; Sudbury, Suffolk, CO10 1NW; England; 52°02′51″N 0°44′03″E

Information
- Type: Academy
- Motto: Ambition – Respect – Endeavour
- Established: 1972
- Trust: Ormiston Academies Trust
- Specialist: Performing Arts
- Department for Education URN: 138506 Tables
- Ofsted: Reports
- Principal: Sally Morris
- Gender: Coeducational
- Age: 11 to 16
- Enrolment: 685
- Colour: Teal Blue
- Sponsor: Ormiston Academies Trust
- Website: http://OrmistonSudburyAcademy.co.uk/

Ormiston Sudbury Academy is an 11–16 secondary school in the town of Sudbury, Suffolk. The school was established in 1972 as Sudbury Upper School, following the country wide introduction of the comprehensive school system, to serve the expanding town of Sudbury, and its surrounding villages. Sudbury Upper School was an amalgamation of Sudbury Grammar School, the High School for Girls and the Secondary Modern School. The school became an Academy in 2012, operated by the Ormiston Academies Trust.

The Academy has a student population of approximately 600, previously there was a sixth form but it was discontinued in September 2022. The Academy draws students from several priority primary schools, in and around Sudbury. In addition, the academy attracts students from outside its catchment area. The academy specialises in Performing Arts.

The Academy is the lead associate school for the Royal Shakespeare Company in the Eastern Region, one of just 25 in the country. The Academy gained platinum Arts Mark award and gold Sport England's Award.

In September 2023, Ormiston Sudbury Academy was rated "Requires Improvement" by Ofsted.

== School site ==
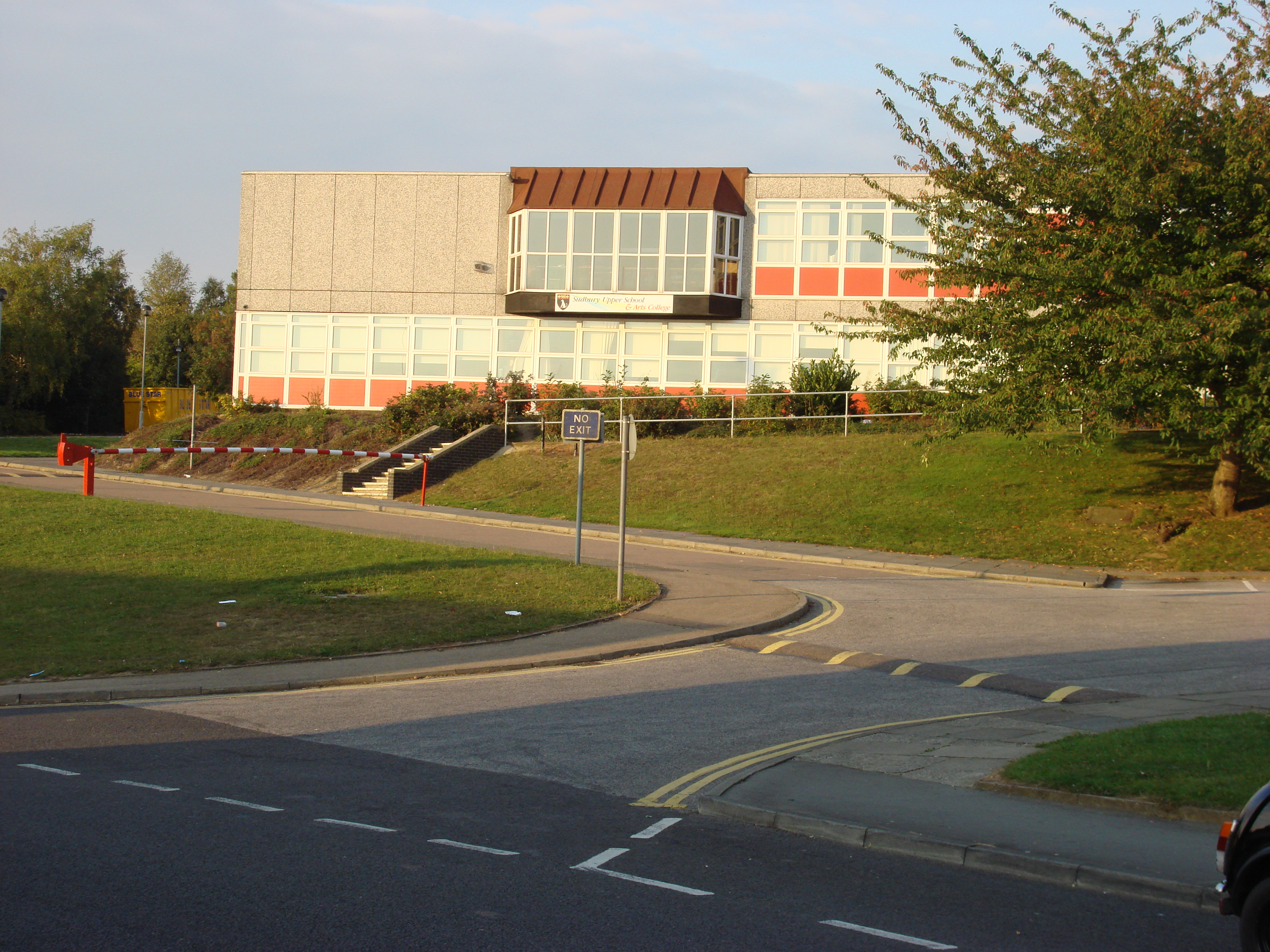
Left side of Ormiston Sudbury Academy

Construction of the building was completed in 1972 as Sudbury Upper School.

Accommodation includes a separate performing arts block and a sports centre. Building of a new vocational teaching block on the site to house construction was completed in September 2008.

The school is expected to have a new building in September 2028 with parts of the new building opening sooner. The new building will be on the site of the current school so as a result, the school is to be knocked down shortly in stages.

== Notable incidents at Sudbury Upper School ==
In August 2007, a former maths teacher was sentenced to a year's imprisonment after pleading guilty to six counts of abusing a position of trust. In spring 2008, a supply teacher was filmed on a camera phone removing his shirt in a cover lesson at the school. As soon as the headteacher found out, the teacher was asked to leave the premises immediately and was banned from working in schools in Suffolk.

== Notable former pupils ==
- Hannah Dodd (born 1995), actress
- Tyler French (born 1999), professional footballer who plays for Sutton United
- Martin Siegert, British glaciologist
