= Breakthrough Energy =

Group of organizations that invest in sustainable energy startups

- Type: Private
- Industry: Energy
- Founded: 2015; 11 years ago
- Founder: Bill Gates
- Headquarters: Kirkland, Washington
- Website: breakthroughenergy.org

Breakthrough Energy is the umbrella name of several organizations, founded by Bill Gates in 2015, that aim to accelerate innovation in sustainable energy and in other technologies to reduce greenhouse gas emissions. It has been investing in a variety of startup companies which were attempting to commercialize new concepts such as nuclear fusion, large-capacity batteries to store renewable energy, and microbe-generated biofuels. In 2025, strategy shifted away from public policy towards supporting clean energy technology alone, as the Second Trump administration has been promoting fossil fuels and dissolved programs addressing climate change.

== History ==
At the 2015 United Nations Climate Change Conference in November 2015, Gates announced that a coalition of 28 high net-worth investors from ten countries had committed to the Breakthrough Energy initiative. A complementary initiative of Gates, Mission Innovation, was announced at the same time.

In December 2016, a group of investors collectively worth US$170 billion announced more personal commitment to funding the efforts of a US$1 billion fund "focused on fighting climate change by investing in clean energy innovation." The fund is named Breakthrough Energy Ventures fund.

In March 2025, Bill Gates dissolved the unit working in Europe and the United States unit working on public policy, because "it was not likely to have a significant effect in Washington", as the Second Trump administration has been promoting fossil fuels and dissolved programs addressing climate change.

== Strategy ==
At its inception in 2015, Gates explained, "The renewable technologies we have today, like wind and solar, have made a lot of progress and could be one path to a zero-carbon energy future... But given the scale of the challenge, we need to be exploring many different paths." Breakthrough Energy invests primarily in businesses where the risk of failure is high and the timeframe for return on investment is 20 years. Traditional venture capitalists look for a return on investment in five years, which may not be enough for the special challenges of the energy sector.

In 2025, strategy shifted away from public policy towards supporting clean energy companies through the Breakthrough Energy Catalyst program, Breakthrough Energy Ventures.

== Members ==
The group is led by Bill Gates, who previously announced a personal $2 billion investment, and includes:

- Jeff Bezos
- Marc Benioff
- Michael Bloomberg
- Richard Branson
- Ray Dalio
- Reid Hoffman
- Jack Ma
- George Soros
- Tom Steyer
- Meg Whitman
- Mark Zuckerberg
- University of California, the sole institutional investor at launch
- Nat Simons
- Mukesh Ambani

== Notable investments ==
- Data Blanket: wildfire drone technology
- Dioxycle: sustainable ethylene from recycled carbon emissions
- Commonwealth Fusion Systems: compact fusion power using high-temperature superconducting magnets
- Fervo Energy: enhanced geothermal systems for reliable, renewable power
- Redwood Materials: closed-loop recycling for lithium-ion batteries and critical materials
- Boston Metal: molten oxide electrolysis for emissions-free metal production
- Form Energy: long-duration iron-air battery storage
- H2Pro: electrochemical and thermally activated water electrolysis for green hydrogen production

== See also ==
- Global Apollo Programme
