= Concrete Sustainability Council =

The Concrete Sustainability Council (CSC) is an industry led NGO and standard setting body focused on decreasing the environmental impact of cement, concrete, and aggregate. The CSC was originally launched by the World Business Council for Sustainable Development project Concrete Sustainability Initiative in 2013.

The initiative's initial goal was to establish a certification system for responsibly sourced concrete and its supply chain. The initiative launched the CSC certification system, which is certification that supports green building certification such as BREEAM, DGNB or LEED. The certification process includes evaluating both supply chain and process used for the production of concrete, and other Environmental and Social consequences. Parts of the certificate are optional, such as the CO_{2} certification -- so not all CSC certified products are low carbon. The certificate is administered by "regional system operators" such as Bundesverband der Deutschen Transportbetonindustrie (German Ready-Mixed Concrete Association) in Germany. As of 2021, 485 concrete industry organizations had the certification.

The certificate comes in four levels Platinum, Gold, Silver and Bronze -- with platinum complying with more of the certification requirements, including mandatory requirements. The standard includes dedicated adjustments for cement, aggregate and concrete.The certification allows designers and architects to better understand the lifecycle and impact of concrete in their construction projects. Cement plants that are retrofitting or trying to become more sustainable, can use the standard to redesign their processes.

Beyond certification, the initiative also supports research for the cement industry, such as a technology roadmap of the cement industry with the IEA.

== Recognition and sustainability frameworks ==
Academic literature has identified certification schemes as an important mechanism for promoting sustainability in the cement and concrete sector. Such schemes provide criteria and verification processes that help assess environmental performance, responsible sourcing practices and social impacts throughout the value chain. A 2024 review of sustainable cement and concrete production identified both Leadership in Energy and Environmental Design (LEED) and the Concrete Sustainability Council (CSC) certification system among the frameworks used to support sustainable construction practices. According to the review, LEED awards credits for the use of responsibly sourced and environmentally preferable construction materials, while CSC focuses specifically on the sustainability performance of cement, aggregate and concrete supply chains through third-party verification of responsible sourcing and management practices.
