= Dioxycle =

French-American technology startup company

- Industry: Technology
- Founded: 2021
- Founders: Sarah Lamaison (CEO); David Wakerley (CTO)
- Website: dioxycle.com

Dioxycle is a French-American technology startup company. Founded in 2021, it aims to develop sustainable ethylene from recycled carbon emissions. In 2023, it raised US$17 million in its Series A round from Lowercarbon Capital, Breakthrough Energy Ventures Europe, and Gigascale Capital. The company's primary product is a proprietary electrolyzer that uses water, carbon dioxide, and electricity to produce ethylene. It moved from lab trials to its first prototype in 2022.

== Corporate structure ==
The company was cofounded by Sarah Lamaison, who serves as its chief executive officer, and its chief technology officer, David Wakerley.
