= Data Blanket =

Data Blanket is an American drone artificial intelligence technology startup company specializing in wildfire management, based in Bellevue, Washington. The startup has developed its own software that utilizes AI to map the perimeter of wildfires, while providing additional real-time information of ground conditions to firefighters on-site. The drones are flown autonomously and are capable of landing on their own.

== History ==
Data Blanket was founded in March 2022 by Omer Bar-Yohay and Yair Katz, both former executives at Eviation Alice, an electric aviation company that Bar-Yohay had also co-founded. Yohay and Katz are both veterans of the Israel Defense Forces, where Katz led special operations. An additional co-founder is Gur Kimchi, who had also co-founded and headed the Amazon Prime Air delivery-by-drone project. Kimchi spent a decade at Microsoft on projects including Virtual Earth and search, and is a founding member of the Federal Aviation Administration’s Drone Advisory Committee. As of 2023, the startup has received more than $4 million in funding, including from Bill Gates's Breakthrough Energy Ventures and Innovation Endeavors, which was co-founded by former Google CEO Eric Schmidt.

As of August 2023, the start-up is currently awaiting approval of two waivers from the Federal Aviation Administration, one for unrestricted UAV use and the other for flying beyond where an operator can see - Beyond visual line of sight. Katz has indicated that he expects approval "Very soon".

As of August 2023, Data Blanket had 14 full-time employees.

== System ==
The start-up utilizes coaxial drones manufactured by Ascent Aerosystems, which run on in-house software developed by Data Blanket. They are equipped with RGB and infrared cameras, AI-based computational software, 5G/Wi-Fi, and advanced navigational features. The drones are self-flown and are capable of autonomously dispatching to and monitoring sites, which can then return to their original location and land on their own. However, a human operator is required to monitor the flight to prevent interference with other UAVs or aircraft.

In the event of a fire, drones are intended to be flown above the radius, providing a 'bird's eye' view of the fire to firefighters on the ground. Approximately four of their drones can cover a 2 mile radius. The system utilizes 5G/Wi-fi technologies to rapidly transmit various data points, which are then processed by its generative model, in turn providing an exact permitter 'mapping' of the fire, in addition to 3D and other information that can be critical for firefighter's efforts; Namely, topography, vegetation, and fuel conditions.

Data Blanket has also stated its intention to eventually be able to generate microweather data, in addition to improved prediction of blaze behavior by continuous training on data gathered from previous fires.
