= Martin Siegert =

British glaciologist

Martin J. Siegert FRSE is a British glaciologist, and Deputy Vice Chancellor (Cornwall) at the University of Exeter. He co-Chairs the Diversity in Polar Science Initiative, and has spoken about socio-economic inclusion in Polar Science and indeed broader society.

He has produced over 300 academic publications and contributed to the development of an airborne surveying technology that has surveyed over half of Antarctica. He is credited with discovering a number of Antarctic subglacial lakes, which as of 2024 total over 600. Siegert's research has shown that subglacial lakes are vast quantities of water frozen several kilometers beneath the surface of the Antarctic ice sheet, can be linked together hydraulically and likely store unique assemblages of microbial life and contain records of ancient ice and climate change.

== Biography ==
He was born in Walthamstow in East London, Siegert was a pupil at Sudbury Upper School in the early 1980s. He earned a bachelor's degree in Geological Geophysics in 1989 from Reading University, and a PhD in the numerical modelling of large ice sheets from Cambridge University in 1994.

== Career ==
After completing his PhD, he then got a lectureship at the University of Wales in Aberystwyth, followed by one at the University of Bristol, where he worked as director of Bristol Glaciology Center.

He was a professor at Imperial College London from 2014 to 2022 and co-director of the Grantham Institute - Climate Change and Environment.

He joined the University of Exeter as a professor and now working as a deputy vice chancellor since 2022. His decision to move the Cornwall campus graduate from Truro Cathedral to the campus grounds has been met with widespread criticism from students and staff.

He formerly served as Head of the School of Geosciences at the University of Edinburgh, where he is currently an Honorary Professor. Siegert directed the Lake Ellsworth Consortium, a UK-NERC-funded programme that planned an experiment to study a massive subglacial lake beneath West Antarctica's ice, and is the UK principal investigator on the International ICECAP programme, which has deployed medium-range geophysical aircraft in Antarctica since 2008.

== Research ==
His research interests focus on glaciology, and he employs geophysical techniques to assess the flow and shape of ice sheets today and in the past. Using airborne radar, he detected and located over 600 subglacial lakes. He identified old pre-glacial surfaces beneath the existing ice and proved how sub-ice water interacts with the flow of ice above it. He directs the UK Natural Environment Research Council Lake Ellsworth Consortium, which seeks to physically quantify and study an ancient subglacial lake in West Antarctica.

Siegert's work involves the study of large ice sheets in the past, at present and in future, using combinations of numerical modelling, satellite observations and glacier geophysical measurements. In 1996, he was part of the Russian-UK team that published an article in Nature revealing subglacial Lake Vostok in East Antarctica to be over 500 m deep. In the same year he published an inventory of Antarctic subglacial lakes that included Lake Ellsworth. He is the UK PI of the US-UK-China-Australia ICECAP programme, that uses long-range airborne geophysics to measure and characterise the ice sheet and lithosphere in previously unexplored regions of Antarctica, including Totten Glacier and the Aurora Subglacial Basin, Byrd Glacier and the Wilkes Subglacial Basin, and Princess Elizabeth Land.

He was the PI of a NERC-funded airborne geophysics campaign to the Weddell Sea sector of West Antarctica (2009-2013), which showed the grounding line of Institute Ice Stream to be perched on a steep reverse sloping bed. In December 2012 he led a NERC-funded attempt to sample Lake Ellsworth using a purpose built clean hot-water drill and water-sampling/measuring probe. The expedition was halted when the drill experienced technical problems preventing drilling to the lake surface. In 2002, Siegert was awarded a Philip Leverhulme Prize by the Leverhulme Trust. In 2007, Siegert was elected as a Fellow of the Royal Society of Edinburgh.

== Media appearances ==
Siegert has featured on national television and radio to explain his study, including BBC Radio 4's Life Scientific in August 2012.

== Awards ==
- In 2013, Siegert was awarded the Martha T. Muse Prize for excellence in Antarctic science and policy.
- Fellow of the Royal Society of Edinburgh in 2007.
- 2003 Philip Leverhulme prize award.

== Selected publications ==
Books

- Siegert, M.J. Ice sheets and Late Quaternary environmental change. John Wiley, Chichester, UK, 231pp. (2001).
- Florindo, F. and Siegert, M.J. (eds.). Antarctic Climate Evolution. Developments in Earth & Environmental Science, vol. 8. Elsevier, Amsterdam, the Netherlands. 606pp. ISBN 9780444528476 (2008).
- Siegert, M.J., Kennicutt, M, Bindschadler, R. (eds.). Antarctic Subglacial Aquatic Environments. AGU Geophysical Monograph 192, 246pp. (2011).
- Siegert, M.J. and Bradwell, T. (eds). Antarctic Earth Sciences. Transactions of the Royal Society of Edinburgh, 104, 1, 80pp. (2013).
- Siegert, M.J., Priscu, J. Alekhina, I., Wadham, J. and Lyons, B. (eds.). Antarctic Subglacial Lake Exploration: first results and future plans. Transactions of the Royal Society of London, A. 374, issue 2059. (2016).
- Siegert, M.J., Jamieson, S.S.R. and White, D.A. (eds.). Exploration of Subsurface Antarctica: uncovering past changes and modern processes. Geological Society of London, Special Publication, 461, 255pp. (2018).
- Nuttall, M., Christensen, T. and Siegert, M.J. (eds.). Routledge Handbook of the Polar Regions. Routledge, 556pp. (2018).
- Florindo, F., Siegert, M.J., De Santis, L. and Naish, T. (eds.). Antarctic Climate Evolution. Second Edition. Elsevier. 804pp. ISBN 9780128191095 (2021).
