= Peter Bakker =

Dutch businessman (1961-)

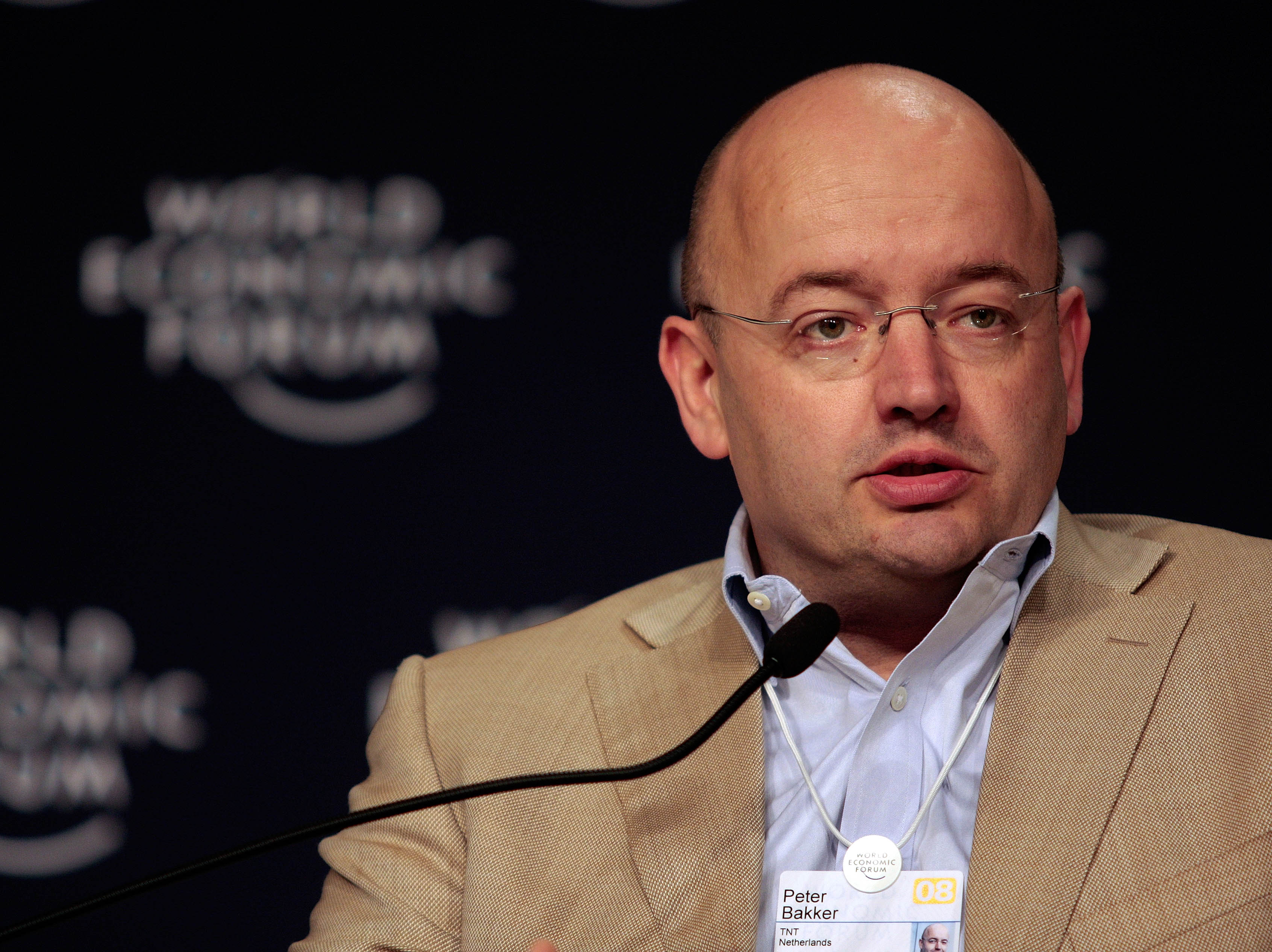
- Peter Bakker at a Press Conference in 2008
- Born: 1 August 1961 (age 65)
- Education: Inholland University of Applied Sciences, Erasmus University Rotterdam
- Title: President of the World Business Council for Sustainable Development

Peter Bakker (born 1 August 1961) is a Dutch businessman who currently serves as president of the World Business Council for Sustainable Development.

== Education ==
Bakker has a master's degree in Economics from Erasmus University Rotterdam and a bachelor's degree in Business Administration from Inholland University of Applied Sciences.

== Career ==
Bakker was appointed President of WBCSD in January 2012 after being CEO of TNT N.V. for 10 years. He is also the Chairman for War Child Netherlands, Deputy Chairman for International Integrated Reporting Council and a Co-Chair in the Sustainable Developments Solution Network.

In 2020, Bakker was appointed by United Nations Secretary-General António Guterres to serve on the Advisory Committee for the 2021 Food Systems Summit, chaired by Inger Andersen.

== Other activities ==
- Nespresso, Member of the Sustainability Advisory Board (NSAB)
- Daimler, Member of the Advisory Board for Integrity and Corporate Responsibility
- P&G, Member of the sustainability advisory board

== Awards ==
Bakker was awarded the Clinton Global Citizen Award in 2009 and the SAM Sustainability Leadership Award.
