= Grantham Institute – Climate Change and Environment (Imperial College London) =

Climate science research centre

The Grantham Institute – Climate Change and Environment (formerly Grantham Institute for Climate Change) is one of five global institutes at Imperial College London and one of three Grantham-sponsored centres in the UK. The institute was founded in 2007 with a £12 million donation from the Grantham Foundation for the Protection of the Environment, an organisation set up by Hannelore and Jeremy Grantham.

The institute brings together climate and global environmental change expertise from across the college for climate change related research and translation into real world impact. Their aim is to improve the interaction between researchers and decision makers in business and governments, communicating research to help ensure that choices are based on the best understanding of the science and evidence available.

== Research ==
Research at the institute is focused on four core ‘themes’: First, Earth systems science, including modelling of climate processes, and biosphere-atmosphere interactions and feedbacks. Second, Risks, extremes and irreversible change, including: the likelihood of extreme events in the future, and their potential impact. Third, sustainable futures, including transition to a low-carbon economy, natural mitigation and carbon storage in ecosystems, and policy and market frameworks to support a low-carbon economy. Fourth, vulnerable ecosystems and human wellbeing, including the impact of environmental change and climate change on ecosystems, and sustainable management plans and policy mechanisms to manage impacts.

== Policy implications ==
A dedicated Policy Team delivers research projects, publications, partnerships, and events, aimed at communicating the science behind global environmental change and its impacts. The team publishes Briefing Paper documents disseminating the scientific understanding, possible solutions, and outcomes to government, business and NGOs.

== Affiliated institutes ==
The Grantham Foundation for the Protection of the Environment also funds three other research institutes: one at the London School of Economics, the Grantham Research Institute on Climate Change and the Environment, the Grantham Centre for Sustainable Futures and the other at the Indian Institute of Science, Bangalore, the Divecha Centre for Climate Change.

== Leadership ==
The institute's co-directors are Professor Joanna Haigh and Professor Martin Siegert.

The institute's chair is Professor Sir Brian Hoskins, professor of meteorology (1981–present) at the University of Reading. Brian Hoskins was director of the institute from 2008 to 2014.

== Projects ==
The institute's partnerships with the private and public sector include:

Climate KIC, a consortium of academic, corporate & public partners and part of the Knowledge and Innovation Community (KIC) initiative set up by the European Institute of Innovation.

Ecosystem Services for Poverty Alleviation Directorate, led by the University of Edinburgh, this directorate provides leadership to the Ecosystem Services for Poverty Alleviation (ESPA) research programme, which aims to improve understanding of how ecosystems function, the services they provide and their relationship with the political economy and sustainable growth.

The AVOID Programme, a government-funded research programme on "Avoiding Dangerous Climate Change" (AVOID). The consortium is led by the Met Office Hadley Centre and the other partners are the Walker Institute at Reading, and the Tyndall Centre. Under this programme work is carried out to inform the UK government's decision making on avoiding dangerous climate change brought on by greenhouse gas emissions.
