= World Business Council for Sustainable Development =

Membership organization for companies

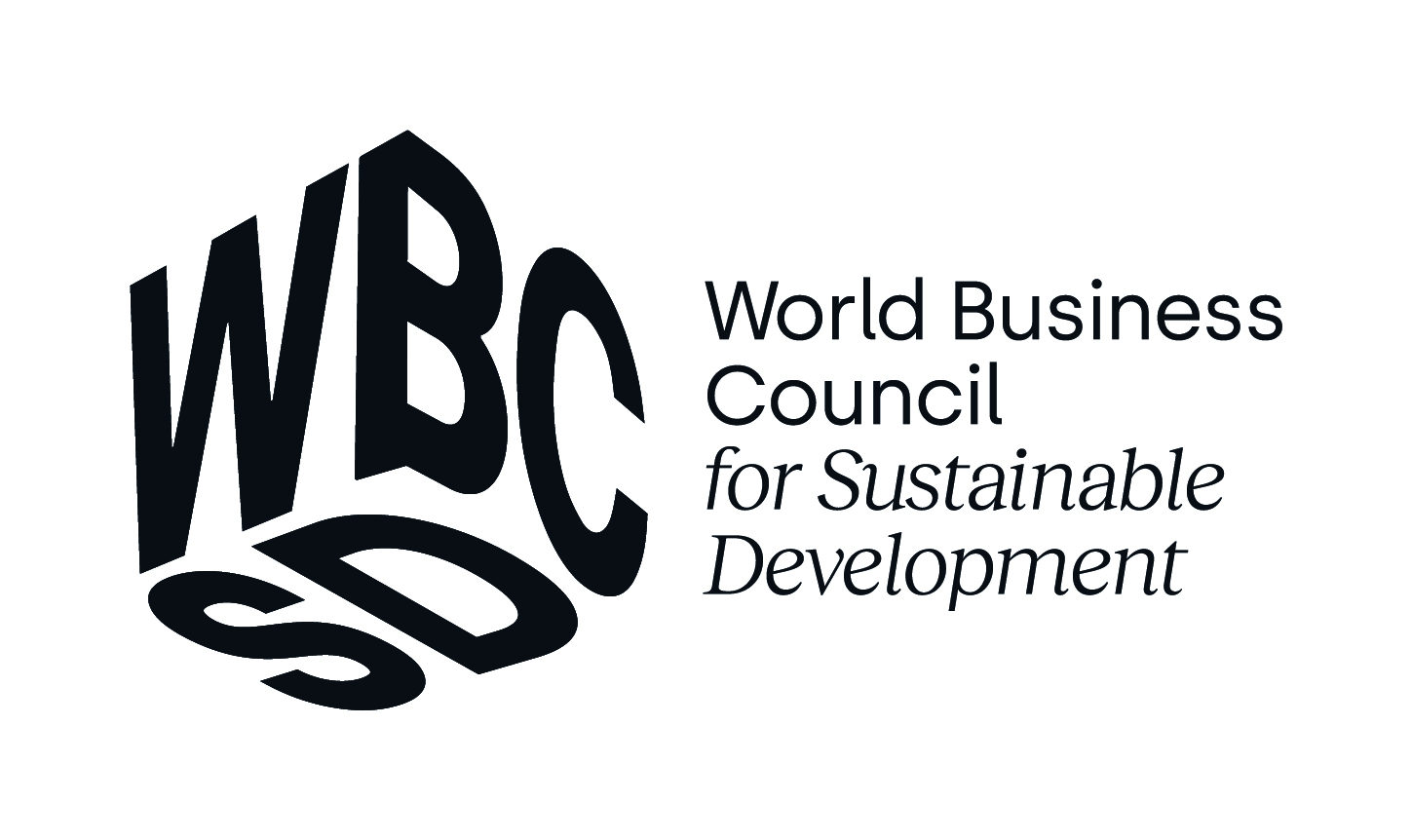
- Founded: 1995
- Founder: Stephan Schmidheiny
- Purpose: Sustainable Development
- Location: Geneva, Switzerland
- Region served: Global
- Key people: Peter Bakker (CEO & President)
- Employees: 51–300
- Website: www.wbcsd.org

The World Business Council for Sustainable Development (WBCSD) is a CEO-led organization of over 259 international companies like Amazon, Meta and Apple. The council is also connected to 60 national and regional business councils and partner organizations.

Its origins date back to the Rio de Janeiro Earth Summit of 1992, when Stephan Schmidheiny, a Swiss business entrepreneur, was appointed chief adviser for business and industry to the secretary general of the United Nations Conference on Environment and Development (UNCED). He created a forum called "Business Council for Sustainable Development", which went on to become Changing Course, a book that coined the concept of eco-efficiency.

The WBCSD was created in 1995 as a merger of the Business Council for Sustainable Development and the World Industry Council for the Environment and is based at the Maison de la paix in Geneva, Switzerland, with offices in New York and New Delhi.

== Operations ==
The council works on a variety of issues related to sustainable development. It works to achieve the Sustainable Development Goals (SDGs) through the transformation of six economic systems: circular economy, cities and mobility, climate and energy, food, land and water, people and redefining value. Each system transformation is set up as a WBCSD Program with a number of supplementary Projects.

== Influence ==
A 2003 World Bank/IFC commissioned study identified the WBCSD as one of the "most influential forums" for companies on corporate social responsibility (CSR) issues. A 2004 Globescan survey found the WBCSD as the second most effective SD research organization. The 2006 survey by the same company reports that 54% of all surveyed experts believe the WBCSD will play a "major role" in advancing sustainable development. Only the European Union received higher approval (69%).

In the Ethisphere Institute's 2007 list of the 100 Most Influential People in Business Ethics, WBCSD President Bjoern Stigson was ranked ninth, which made him the second most influential NGO leader.

The organization helped launch the Concrete Sustainability Initiative.

== Membership ==
Membership of the WBCSD is by invitation of the executive committee to companies committed to sustainable development. WBCSD has over 250 members.

=== Forética ===
Forética claims to be a global network of Spanish speaking businesses and professionals whose mission is to promote an ethical management and corporate social responsibility by the establishment of a National standard in Spain known as SGE-21, (sistema de gestión ética para el Siglo 21) which is also Annex 1 to ISO 26000 and supported by CSR Europe Membership is said to around 400 and includes companies of all sizes and sectors, as well as individual specialists, professionals, and academics and it was incorporated into WBCSD on 2 September 2014.

== Governance ==
The WBCSD is a member-led organization governed by a Council composed of the Council Members of its member companies. The Council elects the executive committee, including the chairman and four Vice Chairmen. Past chairmen include:

- Rodney F. Chase – BP (1995)
- Livio D. DeSimone – 3M (1996/97)
- Egil Myklebust – Norsk Hydro (1998/99)
- Charles O. Holliday, Jr. – DuPont (2000/01)
- Sir Philip Watts KCMG – Royal Dutch Shell (2002/03)
- Bertrand Collomb – Lafarge (2004/05)
- Travis Engen – Alcan (2006/07)
- Sam DiPiazza – PwC (2008/09)
- Paul Polman – Unilever (2012–17)
- Sunny Verghese – Olam (2018–2020)

== Geographic balance ==
Most of WBCSD's member companies are headquartered in Europe (47%). 22% member companies are headquartered in Asia, 22% in North America and 5% in Latin America. The geographically least represented regions are Africa, Australasia and the Middle East with 1% each.

== Controversies ==
According to Greenpeace the World Business Council for Sustainable Development is among the key players responsible for holding back the world societies from tackling the climate change and energy management challenges for the past 20 years. The WBCSD Executive Committee was dominated by the largest non-renewable energy and carbon-intensive companies in the world at least until 2011. According to Greenpeace the WBCSD executive committee has been a 'Who's Who' of the world's largest carbon-intensive companies.

The Sierra Club has collaborated with the World Business Council on a number of initiatives, as well as inviting its representatives to speak at Sierra Club events. The Environmental Defense Fund recommends the World Business Council's auditing methods to companies seeking to reduce greenhouse emissions, and the Natural Resources Defense Council has drawn upon WBCSD guidelines in drawing up their own guidelines for determining biofuels sustainability. The WBCSD's Vision 2050 report was highlighted by The Guardian as "the largest concerted corporate sustainability action plan to date – include reversing the damage done to ecosystems, addressing rising greenhouse gas emissions and ensuring societies move to sustainable agriculture."
