= Antarctic lakes =

Bodies of water in Antarctica

There are hundreds of antarctic lakes in Antarctica. In 2018, researchers at the Alfred Wegener Institute for Polar and Marine Research published a study they claimed cast doubt on the earlier estimate that there were almost 400 subglacial antarctic lakes. Antarctica also has some relatively small regions that are clear of ice and snow, and there are some surface lakes in these regions. They called for on the ground seismic studies, or drilling, to determine a more reliable number.

These lakes are buried beneath deep layers of glacial ice. When a glacier is very thick, the pressure at the bottom is great enough that liquid water can exist at temperatures where water would freeze, at regular pressures. The ice above Lake Vostok, the largest antarctic lake, is approximately 2 miles (3.2 kilometers) thick.

Scientists studying the lakes, by careful drilling and water sampling, suggest conditions there may resemble the oceans believed to exist on planet Jupiter's moon Europa.

== Selected Antarctic lakes ==
Selected Antarctic lakes
Name	Surface area	Depth	Volume	Below surface	Notes
Ablation Lake		117 metres (384 feet)+		500 metres (1,600 feet)	The lake contains both saline and fresh water layers.
Algae Lake					An ice-free lake in the ice-free Bunger Hills highlands.
Amphitheatre Lake					A surface lake.
Beaver Lake					A surface lake, near a "stagnant" glacier, its name derives from the STOL Beaver aircraft used to supply a nearby base, not from the presence of actual beavers.
Lake Boeckella					A surface lake, named for the crustaceans from the genus Boeckella it hosts.
Lake Burton	1.35 square kilometres (0.52 square miles)	18.3 metres (60 feet)	9,690,000 cubic metres (342,000,000 cubic feet)		A meromictic and saline lagoon.
Concordia Lake	900 square kilometres (350 square miles)	250 metres (820 feet)	200 cubic kilometres (48 cu mi)	4 kilometres (2.5 miles)	A large subglacial lake, discovered in 1999. In 2009 it was the second largest subglacial lake to be studied.
Lake Ellsworth	30 square kilometres (12 square miles)	150 metres (490 feet)		1,400 metres (4,600 feet)	
Forlidas Pond					This small pond is the only pond in the northern Pensacola Mountains.
Lake Whillans	60 square kilometres (23 square miles)	~2 metres (6.6 feet)		800 metres (2,600 feet)	
