= Mercer Lake (Antarctica) =

Subglacial lake in Antarctica

Mercer Subglacial Lake
- PPT-16
- Location in West Antarctica
- Location: Marie Byrd Land
- Coordinates: 84.661°S 149.677°W
- Type: Subglacial lake
- Ocean/sea sources: Ross Sea
- Max. length: 9 km (5.6 mi)
- Surface area: 160 km^{2} (62 sq mi)
- Average depth: 10–15 metres (33–49 ft)
- Residence time: ~10 years

Mercer Subglacial Lake is a subglacial lake in Antarctica covered by a sheet of ice 1,067 m (3,501 ft) thick; the water below is hydraulically active, with water replacement times on the order of a decade from the Ross Sea. Studies suggest that Mercer Subglacial Lake as well as other subglacial lakes appear to be linked, with drainage events in one reservoir causing filling and follow-on drainage in adjacent lakes.

== Exploration ==
Helen Amanda Fricker from the Scripps Institution of Oceanography discovered Mercer Subglacial Lake in 2007, while using satellite laser altimetry to search for the grounding line of a glacier. The lake is named after Mercer Ice Stream (formerly Ice Stream A), beneath which the lake is located. Mercer Ice Stream is named after the late Ohio State University glaciologist John Mercer. On 28 December 2018, the Subglacial Antarctic Lakes Scientific Access (SALSA) Project, for which she serves on the project's executive committee, announced they had reached Mercer Subglacial Lake after two days of melting their way through 1,067 m (3,501 ft) of ice with a high-pressure hot-water drill. The drill water is run through filters that catch 99.9% of bacteria and particles, followed by UV light exposure and pasteurization. The team obtained water samples for chemical and biological analyses, as well as samples of basal ice, and sediment cores as deep as 1.76 m (5.8 ft).

== Preliminary results ==
The lake water samples contains enough oxygen to support aquatic animals, and bacteria are present with a density of at least 10,000 cells per millilitre. Other ancient organisms retrieved from the sediments include shells of diatoms (a photosynthetic algae) and thread-like plants or fungi. The sediment cores will also be analysed by geobiologists to study how relict organic matter deposited during marine incursions influences contemporary biodiversity and carbon cycling.

== See also ==
- Glacial lake
- Lake Vostok
- Lake Ellsworth
- Lake Hodgson
- Lake Untersee
- List of Antarctic subglacial lakes
- Supraglacial lake
- Underground lake
