= Subglacial lakes on Mars =

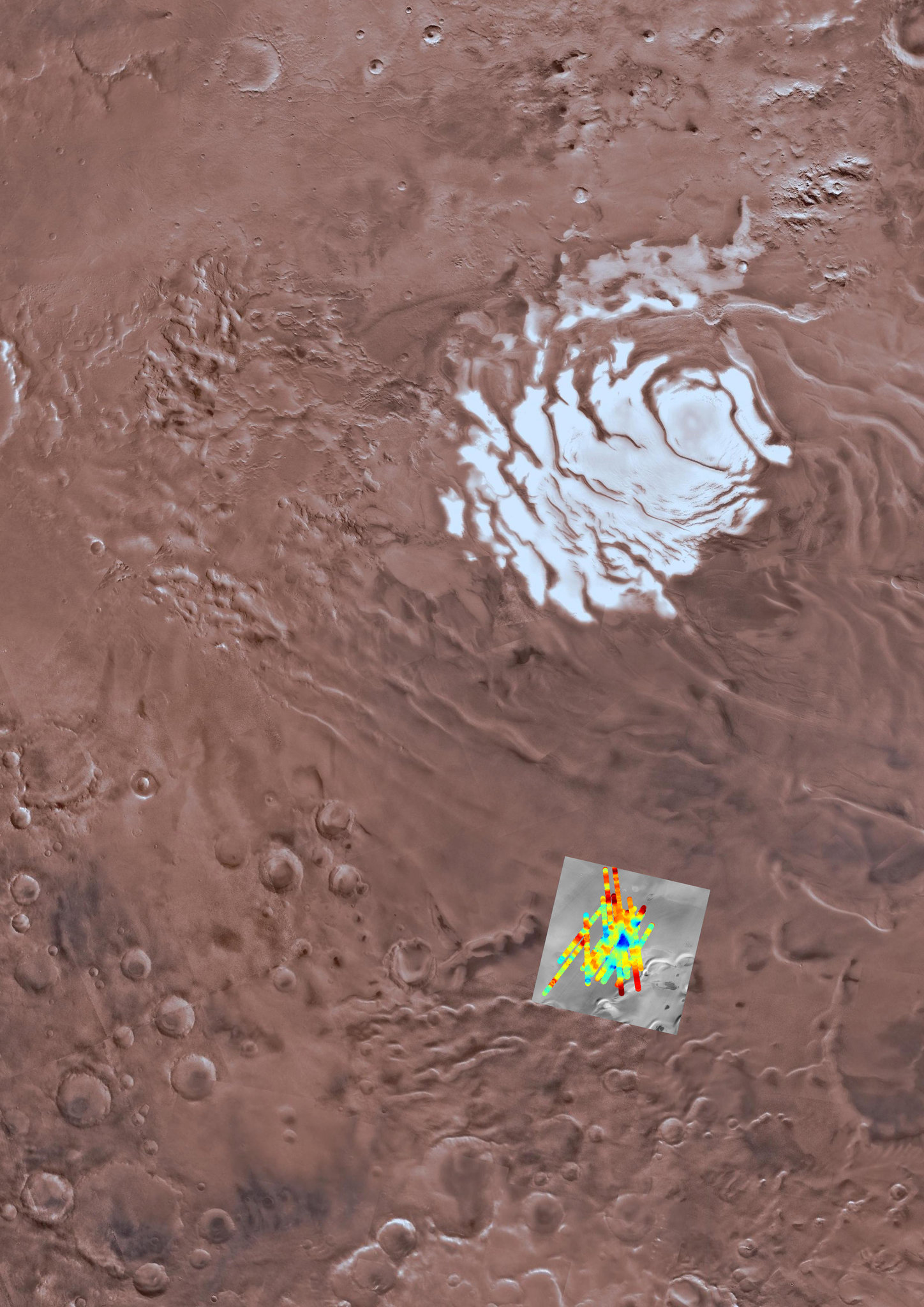
The square indicates color-coded results superimposed on the location of the reported subglacial lake at 193°E, 81°S. Blue represents the area with the brightest radar reflection.

Salty subglacial lakes are controversially inferred from radar measurements to exist below the South Polar Layered Deposits (SPLD) in Ultimi Scopuli of Mars' southern ice cap. The idea of subglacial lakes due to basal melting at the polar ice caps on Mars was first hypothesized in the 1980s. For liquid water to persist below the SPLD, researchers propose that perchlorate is dissolved in the water, which lowers the freezing temperature, but other explanations such as saline ice or hydrous minerals have been offered. Challenges for explaining sufficiently warm conditions for liquid water to exist below the southern ice cap include low amounts of geothermal heating from the subsurface and overlying pressure from the ice. As a result, it is disputed whether radar detections of bright reflectors were instead caused by other materials such as saline ice or deposits of minerals such as clays. While lakes with salt concentrations 20 times that of the ocean pose challenges for life, potential subglacial lakes on Mars are of high interest for astrobiology because microbial ecosystems have been found in deep subglacial lakes on Earth, such as in Lake Whillans in Antarctica below 800 m of ice.

== Features ==
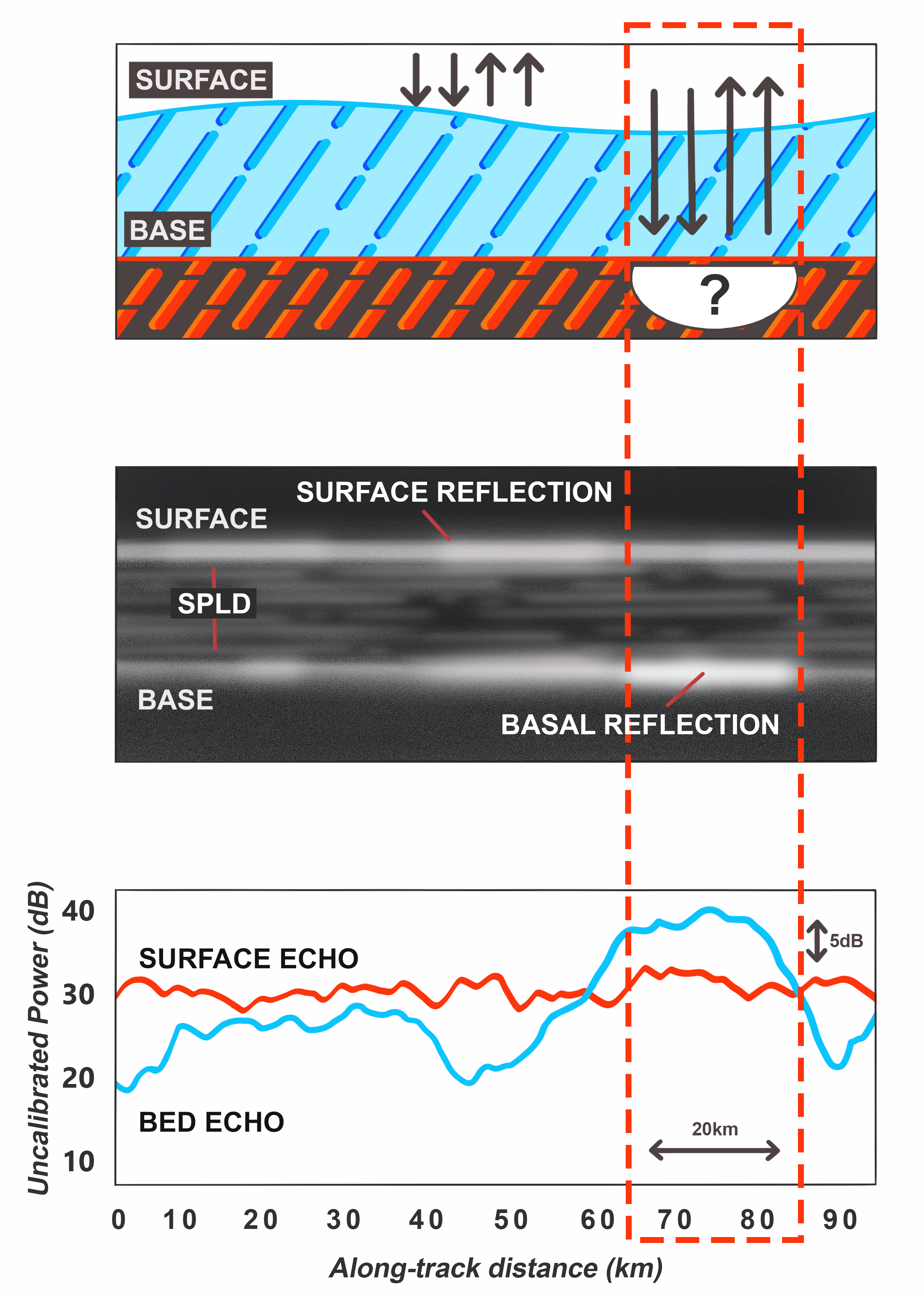
The proposed subglacial lake at the base of the South Polar Layered Deposits on Mars has a stronger radar reflection than ice or rock. Analyses are based on radar profiles (such as in the middle panel) taken by the Mars Advanced Radar for Subsurface and Ionosphere Sounding (MARSIS) and was first interpreted as a subglacial lake.

A study from 2018 first reported radar observations of a potential 20-km wide subglacial lake centered at 193°E, 81°S at the base of the SPLD using data from the Mars Advanced Radar for Subsurface and Ionosphere Sounding (MARSIS) instrument on the European Space Agency's Mars Express spacecraft. The team noticed radar echoes stronger than what ice or rock would reflect coming from 1.5 km below the surface at the base of the SPLD. They interpreted the bright radar reflections to indicate high permittivity (the ability of a material to become polarized and store energy in response to an electric field), consistent with liquid water. Three additional subglacial lakes on the km-wide scale next to the original lake were also proposed from a more detailed study, though the study also indicates the possibility that the three locations could contain wet sediment instead of lakes.

Though the SHAllow RADar (SHARAD) on the Mars Reconnaissance Orbiter operates at higher frequencies, a subglacial lake should be detectable but bright radar reflectors are absent. However, with the discovery of many widespread occurrences of the radar features in the SPLD area, corroboration between the two instruments might become possible.

== Physical limits ==
=== Geothermal heating and perchlorate ===
The radar evidence can be difficult to understand due to scattering effects of the layers in the SPLD on radar reflections (according to an eLetter by Hecht et al. replying to the original publication along with other sources ). As a result, further work has focused on explaining how the freezing temperature at the base of the SPLD might be lowered due to a combination of perchlorate salt and enhanced regional geothermal flux. Following the detection of perchlorate in the northern plains of Mars by the Phoenix lander, it was predicted that perchlorate could allow a brine of 1–3 meters deep to exist at the base of the northern ice cap of Mars. Perchlorate is a salt now considered to be widespread on Mars and is known to lower the freezing point of water. The studies in support of the subglacial lake hypothesis proposed that magnesium and calcium perchlorate at the base of the SPLD would lower the freezing point of water to temperatures as low as 204 and 198 K, thereby allowing the existence of briny liquid water. However, even taking into account perchlorate, computer simulations predict the temperature to still be too cold for liquid water to exist at the bottom of the southern ice cap. This is due to a small amount of pressure melting (Mars' gravity is about a third of Earth's) that would only lower the melting point by 0.3-0.5 K and an estimated low geothermal heat flux of 14-30 mW/m^{2}. A geothermal heat flux greater than 72 mW/m^{2} would support the subglacial lake, thus requiring a local enhancement in the heat flux, perhaps sourced by geologically recent (within hundreds of thousands of years ago) magmatism in the subsurface. Similarly, another study based on the surface topography and ice thickness found that the radar detection did not coincide with their predictions of locations for subglacial lakes based on hydrological potential, and as a result, they proposed the detection was due to a localized patch of basal melting rather than a lake.

Liquid brine water is proposed to be plausible at the SPLD because magnesium and calcium perchlorate solutions can be supercooled to as low as 150 K and the surface temperature at the south pole is approximately 160 K. In addition, it is expected that the temperature at depth for the ice would increase at a rate based on the undetermined geothermal flux and thermal properties of the SPLD. However, a study found the bright radar reflectors to be widespread across the SPLD, rather than limited to the previously identified areas of the putative subglacial lakes. Since the bright radar detections covered a wide variety of conditions at the SPLD (e.g., different temperatures, ice thicknesses), this presents challenges for all of the bright radar reflectors to be indicative of liquid water.

=== Surface features ===
Additional approaches to determining the plausibility of the subglacial lakes included a study looking for surface features induced by such lakes. On Earth, examples of surface features caused by a subglacial lake include fractures or ridge features like at Pine Island Glacier in Antarctica. While a study on Mars only found surface features that match CO_{2} and wind-related processes and none corresponding to the putative subglacial lakes, the lack of surface features also do not rule out the possibility of the subglacial lake. This is because while the surface of the SPLD is expected to be at least thousands of years old and possibly millions of years old, it is hard to constrain when the putative subglacial lake would have modified the surface features.

== Alternative hypotheses ==
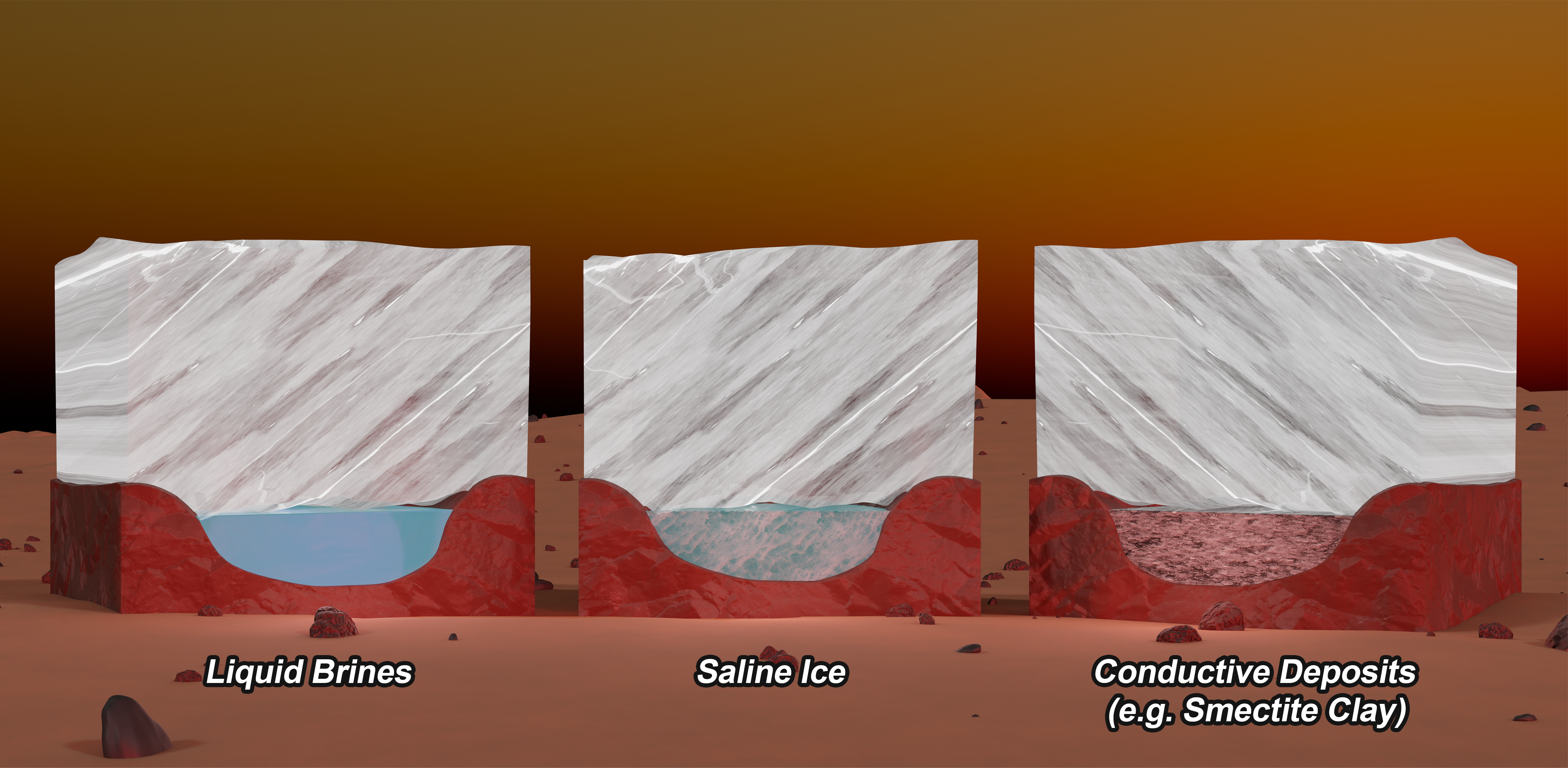
Three leading hypotheses to explain the bright basal radar reflections below the South Polar Layered Deposits include liquid brines, saline ice, and conductive deposits such as smectites. Not included in this image is additional work on igneous sources. (Image credit: This corresponds to Figure 2 from Schroeder & Steinbrugge 2021 obtained with permission from D. Shroeder using the Creative Commons Attribution-Share Alike 4.0 copyright license.)

In contrast with the hypothesis of subglacial water at the base of the SPLD, other suggestions include materials such as saline ice, a conductive mineral deposit such as clays, and igneous materials. Future work is necessary to resolve how these alternative hypotheses hold under Mars-like conditions using instruments like MARSIS.

=== Saline ice ===
While the initial study assumed negligible conductivity in their calculation of the permittivity values, by accounting for conductivity, conductive materials that are not liquid water may also be considered. Instead of the assumption that the bright radar reflections at the base of the ice cap are due to a large contrast in dielectric permittivity, another study suggested that the bright reflection is instead due to a large contrast in electric conductivity in the materials. Saline ice, observed on Earth beneath the Taylor Glacier in Antarctica, is one potential source for the bright basal reflections, though the electric conductivity of saline ice at martian temperatures is unknown.

=== Hydrous minerals ===
The mineralogical explanation is the most favored in follow-up studies, especially with specific hydrous minerals such as jarosite (a sulfate) and smectite (a clay mineral). Smectites have high enough dielectric permittivity to account for the bright reflections (though at laboratory temperatures of 230 K higher than expected conditions on Mars), and they exist at the edges of the SPLD. Ultimately, although the studies propose these new hypotheses, they do not completely reject the possibility of liquid water as the source of the bright radar returns.

=== Igneous materials ===
Another study applied computer simulations to look for what other regions on Mars might cause similar bright basal reflectors if there was a 1.4-km thick ice shell covering the base material. They found that 0.3%-2% of the surface of Mars could produce similar signals, most of which belong to volcanic regions. While the permittivity of igneous materials requires more research, they pointed out how high density igneous content may also cause the observed bright radar reflectors.

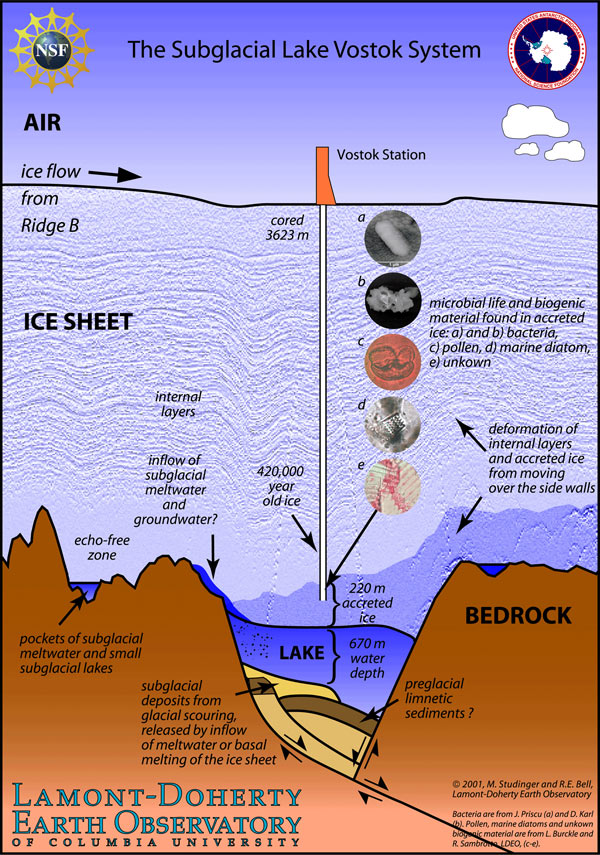
Lake Vostok in Antarctica has been covered by ice for the last 25 million years. Microbes found near the bottom of the accreted ice and in the water have interesting implications for astrobiology. (Image credit: Lamont-Doherty Earth Observatory of Columbia University/NASA.)

== Terrestrial analogue sites and habitability ==
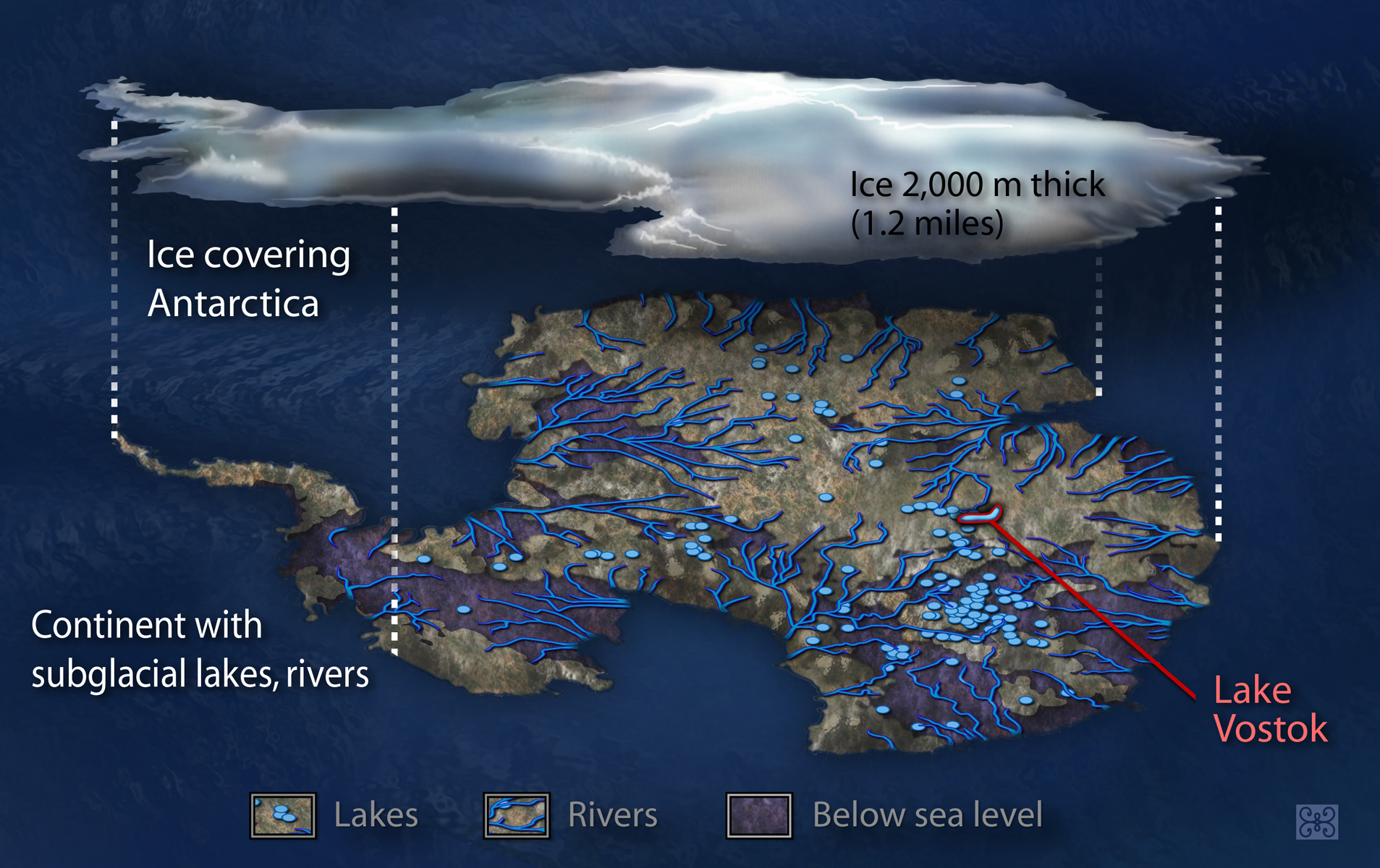
Lake Vostok and other subglacial rivers and lakes in Antarctica. (Image credit: NASA.)

The putative subglacial lakes are of interest for the possibility of supporting life. If physical conditions allowed one location of subglacial liquid water on Mars to exist, then this might extend to other subsurface biospheres on the planet. On Earth, subglacial lakes exist below hundreds of meters of ice in both the Arctic and Antarctic and act as a planetary analog for both the potential subglacial lakes on Mars and liquid oceans below icy shells of moons like Europa. To study life in subglacial lakes on Earth, ice core drilling is used to reach the water, but contamination is commonly considered to have compromised attempts to sample the water of both Lake Vostok and Lake Ellsworth. However, microbes have been sampled from the accretion ice (frozen lake water) of Lake Vostok. Also, Lake Whillans was a successful sampling endeavor from under 800 m of ice, where over 4000 species of chemoautotroph microbes have been identified. Whether similar microbes could survive in the putative salty subglacial lakes on Mars is still unknown, but if liquid water is present, it could preserve inactive microbial life.

== See also ==
- Lunar water
