= Helen Fricker =

American glaciologist and professor

Helen Amanda Fricker
- Born: May 3, 1969 (age 57)
- Education: Bsc University College London; PhD University of Tasmania
- Spouse: Glyn Fricker
- Awards: Muse Prize (2010); Fellow of the American Geophysical Union (2017)
- Scientific career
- Fields: Glaciology; Oceanography
- Workplaces: Scripps Institution of Oceanography
- Thesis: Applications of ERS Satellite Altimetry in Lambert-Amery System, Antarctica (1999)
- Website: scrippsscholars.ucsd.edu/hafricker

Helen Amanda Fricker (born 1969) is a glaciologist and professor at Scripps Institution of Oceanography at the University of California, San Diego where she is a director of the Scripps Polar Center. She won the 2010 Martha T. Muse Prize for Science and Policy in Antarctica.

== Early life and education ==
Helen attended Altrincham Grammar School for Girls, where she encountered Melissa Lord, a brilliant and passionate female physics teacher who steered her onto the path of becoming a scientist.

In 1991, she received her B.Sc. in Mathematics and Physics from University College London (UCL), with first-class honours. In her final year at UCL, she took an Earth science course from a lecturer, Chris Rapley, who was leader of the Remote Sensing Group at UCL and would later become the director of the British Antarctic Survey. Chris Rapley, encouraged her to do a dissertation on using remote-sensing data to track icebergs in the Antarctic during her final year. This course turned her attention toward Antarctica — and got her started on a career in glaciology.

She earned her Ph.D. in glaciology from the Institute of Antarctic and Southern Ocean Studies, University of Tasmania, Australia in 1998. In 1999, Fricker began her work at the Scripps Institution of Oceanography as a postgraduate researcher. Fricker is now a professor of geophysics in the Cecil H. and Ida M. Green Institute of Geophysics and Planetary Physics at Scripps Institution of Oceanography at UC San Diego. She and her husband Glyn Fricker have three daughters.

== Career and impact ==
Fricker has authored over 130 publications relating to the satellite remote sensing of Antarctica's ice shelves and active subglacial lakes. Fricker is widely recognized for her discovery of active subglacial lakes using ICESat laser altimetry, and she has shown that these lakes form dynamic hydrologic systems, where one lake can drain into another in a short period of time. Fricker was the first to describe Lake Whillans in 2007, an active subglacial lake in West Antarctica, which was subsequently the first such environment to be sampled and found to contain life.

She is also known for her innovative research into Antarctic ice shelf mass budget processes such as iceberg calving and basal melting and freezing. Her research focuses on ice sheets in Antarctica and Greenland and their role in the climate system and on subglacial hydrology. She uses a combination of satellite radar and laser altimetry and other remote-sensing data to understand ice sheet processes. Some specific processes Fricker investigates include subglacial hydrology by monitoring the activity of subglacial lakes under the ice streams, ice flexure from tidal activity in the grounding zone, basal melting and freezing under the ice shelves, and the propagation and evolution of active ice shelf rifts, which eventually lead to iceberg calving.

Fricker was one of the primary investigators on the Whillans Ice Stream Subglacial Access Research Drilling (WISSARD) project, which became the first group to drill into an Antarctic subglacial lake, Subglacial Lake Whillans, in 2013 Fricker has held numerous positions relating to her study of the cryosphere, including Chair of AGU's Cryospheric Sciences Focus Group from 2004 to 2006, Elected Member of the NASA ICESat Science Team from 2006–present, as part of the Ice, Cloud and land Elevation (ICESat) mission from 1999–present and the ICESat-2 Science Definition Team and the NASA Sea Level Change Team. She has been Science Team lead for ICESat-2 since May 2023. She co-chairs the Scripps Polar Center at Scripps Institution of Oceanography along with Fiamma Straneo.

The Fricker Ice Piedmont was named after her by the British Antarctic Place-names Committee in 2020.

== Awards and honors ==
Fricker received the Royal Tasmania Society Doctoral Award for her PhD in 2001. She received the NASA Group Achievement Award for her role in the Ice, Cloud, and Land Elevation Satellite (ICESat) Mission Development Team in 2004. In 2010, she was awarded the Martha T. Muse Prize for Science and Policy in Antarctica by the Tinker Foundation and the Scientific Committee on Antarctic Research She was elected Fellow of the American Geophysical Union in 2017. She was awarded the Seligman Crystal by the International Glaciological Society in 2024.
