= List of Antarctic subglacial lakes =

This is a list of subglacial lakes in Antarctica.

== Table of subglacial lakes ==
Name	Latitude (N)	Longitude (E)	Length (m)	Ice Thickness (m)	References
Sovetskaya Lake	-78.100	88.500	75000	4200	Robin et al. (1970, Oswald and Robin, (1973); Bell et al. (2006)
Lake Vostok	-78.150	104.500	280000	3945	Oswald and Robin (1973), Siegert & Ridley, (1998b), Tabacco et al. (2003), (Studinger et al. 2003)
SPRI-3	-76.570	124.800	5000	3621	Oswald and Robin (1973)
SPRI-4	-73.280	157.280	3500	2827	Oswald and Robin (1973)
SPRI-5	-77.200	119.270	10000	3835	Oswald and Robin (1973)
Concordia Lake	-74.070	125.020	45000	4055	Oswald and Robin (1973), Filina (2007)
SPRI-7	-88.300	-150.000	5000	2807	Oswald and Robin (1973)
SPRI-8	-72.310	123.940	10000	3254	Oswald and Robin (1973)
SPRI-9/16/20	-76.800	129.700	5000	3410	Oswald and Robin (1973); Siegert & Ridley (1998a).
SPRI-10	-75.940	127.410	5000	3449	Oswald and Robin (1973)
SPRI-11/ITL-7	-75.810	126.560	10725	3634	Oswald and Robin (1973); Tabacco et al. (2003)
SPRI-12	-75.650	125.600	5000	3399	Oswald and Robin (1973)
SPRI-13/14/ITL-10	-75.840	122.660	11465	3427	Oswald and Robin (1973); Tabacco et al. (2003)
SPRI-15	-75.140	126.980	2000	3447	Oswald and Robin (1973)
SPRI-17	-73.450	119.540	15000	3924	Oswald and Robin (1973)
Adventure Trench Lake	-76.237	135.339	52000	3780	Carter et al. (2007)
SPRI-19	-79.930	148.270	8375	2333	Siegert et al. (1996)
SPRI-21	-74.910	128.900	670	3890	Siegert et al. (1996)
SPRI-22	-75.970	124.950	3685	3168	Siegert et al. (1996)
SPRI-23	-75.780	125.970	3015	3162	Siegert et al. (1996)
SPRI-24	-75.690	126.480	4188	3650	Siegert et al. (1996)
SPRI-25/76	-74.974	124.701	3484	3045	Siegert et al. (1996), Blankenship et al. (2009)
SPRI-26	-75.610	120.390	2680	3057	Siegert et al. (1996)
SPRI-27	-73.400	126.900	6700	4010	Siegert et al. (1996)
SPRI-28/63	-73.170	128.350	28100 + 4000	4050	Siegert & Ridley (1998a), Wright et al. (2012)
SPRI-29	-69.710	140.950	2848	2269	Siegert et al. (1996)
SPRI-30/58	-68.440	136.870	43550	4117	Siegert et al. (1996)
SPRI-31	-75.820	129.030	3015	3069	Siegert et al. (1996)
SPRI-32	-76.400	126.030	2881	3500	Siegert et al. (1996)
SPRI-33	-74.030	118.500	8650	4084	Wright et al. (2012)
Aurora Lake	-74.460	119.370	18275	4066	Tabacco et al. (2003), Wright et al. (2012)
SPRI-35	-77.120	126.300	8375	3741	Siegert et al. (1996)
SPRI-36	-71.810	128.350	1550	2994	Wright et al. (2012)
SPRI-37	-71.790	128.200	1340	3021	Wright et al. (2012)
SPRI-38	-74.040	139.920	1608	3285	Siegert et al. (1996)
SPRI-39	-75.730	148.860	6700	3010	Siegert et al. (1996)
SPRI-40	-88.500	120.000	3350	3100	Siegert et al. (1996)
SPRI-41	-87.000	75.000	3183	2943	Siegert et al. (1996)
SPRI-42/43	-76.190	125.180	10050	3884	Siegert & Ridley (1998a)
SPRI-44	-81.840	133.470	2680	2641	Siegert et al. (1996)
SPRI-45	-79.430	154.130	6700	2036	Siegert et al. (1996)
SPRI-46	-77.400	100.400	2412	3709	Siegert et al. (1996)
SPRI-47	-76.800	97.500	1608	3715	Siegert et al. (1996)
SPRI-48	-88.730	64.520	3350	2997	Siegert et al. (1996)
SPRI-49	-88.360	70.540	5360	3027	Siegert et al. (1996)
SPRI-50	-88.370	112.680	3350	3068	Siegert et al. (1996)
SPRI-51	-87.610	148.620	8040	3062	Siegert et al. (1996)
SPRI-52	-88.710	136.880	1876	3070	Siegert et al. (1996)
SPRI-53	-88.420	144.500	1675	2741	Siegert et al. (1996)
SPRI-54/59	-77.100	92.500	3350	3784	Siegert et al. (1996)
SPRI-55	-78.000	99.000	11725	3399	Siegert et al. (1996)
SPRI-56	-71.130	155.680	10050	2347	Siegert et al. (1996)
SPRI-57	-70.470	151.600	1675	2418	Siegert et al. (1996)
SPRI-60	-76.800	93.500	1340	3426	Siegert et al. (1996)
SPRI-61	-79.150	144.300	5025	2580	Siegert et al. (1996)
SPRI-62	-72.740	129.410	2010	3828	Siegert et al. (1996)
SPRI-64	-75.760	119.710	2512	3574	Siegert et al. (1996)
SPRI-65	-76.070	118.110	5025	3733	Siegert et al. (1996)
SPRI-66	-78.000	118.600	14070	3341	Siegert et al. (1996)
SPRI-67	-79.090	246.500	2010	2700	Siegert et al. (1996)
SPRI-68	-82.060	261.050	1675	2894	Siegert et al. (1996)
SPRI-69	-79.040	67.730	6700	2500	Siegert et al. (1996)
South Pole Lake (SPRI-70)	-89.970	198.440	10000	2857	Siegert et al., (2005), Peters et al. (2008)
SPRI-71	-82.990	265.080	1340	3200	Siegert et al. (1996)
SPRI-72	-86.360	253.830	1675	2814	Siegert et al. (1996)
SPRI-73	-86.430	254.440	1340	2906	Siegert et al. (1996)
SPRI-74	-86.770	248.740	1675	3960	Siegert et al. (1996)
SPRI-75	-87.770	234.700	5025	2315	Siegert et al. (1996)
SPRI-77	-74.920	124.190	1943	3925	Siegert et al. (1996), not recorded by Blankenship et al. (2009)
Subglacial Lake Ellsworth	-78.990	269.430	14700	3400	Siegert et al. (2005); Woodward et al. (2010)
ITL-1	-75.460	121.630	2178	3570	Tabacco et al. (2003)
ITL-2	-75.624	121.607	1142	3513	Tabacco et al. (2003)
ITL-3	-75.422	122.315	1712	3030	Tabacco et al. (2003)
ITL-4	-74.785	122.284	3086	3769	Tabacco et al. (2003)
ITL-5	-75.345	125.022	4486	3150	Tabacco et al. (2003)
ITL 6	-75.954	126.028	4453	2975	Tabacco et al. (2003)
ITL 8	-74.913	121.732	1993	3416	Tabacco et al. (2003)
ITL 9	-75.024	125.918	3296	3461	Tabacco et al. (2003); Blankenship et al. (2009)
ITL 11	-75.608	117.686	3369	4457	Tabacco et al. (2003)
ITL 12	-74.673	116.421	27229	4155	Tabacco et al. (2003)
ITL 13	-74.881	116.936	11828	4460	Tabacco et al. (2003)
Vincennes Lake	-74.158	127.940	26608	4028	Tabacco et al., 2003; Blankenship et al. (2009)
ITL 17	-73.702	119.715	9573	4034	Tabacco et al. (2003)
ITL 18	-77.626	115.191	5914	3500	Tabacco et al. (2003)
M-310	-74.300	26.939	10000	2427	Popov and Masolov (2003)
M-511	-80.903	14.467	8000	2340	Popov and Masolov (2003)
M-511	-75.167	27.289	10000	2770	Popov and Masolov (2003)
M-610	-75.745	33.091	5000	2560	Popov and Masolov (2003)
M-2011	-77.499	37.432	20000	3125	Popov and Masolov (2003)
M-2710	-73.424	39.892	18000	2180	Popov and Masolov (2003)
M-2713	-75.463	27.032	20000	2830	Popov and Masolov (2003)
M-3112	-77.704	44.461	15000	2860	Popov and Masolov (2003)
M-3710	-77.962	32.617	15000	3070	Popov and Masolov (2003)
M-3010	-82.343	77.891	5000	3575	Popov and Masolov (2003)
M-3510	-77.958	62.728	5000	2834	Popov and Masolov (2003)
M-3112	-77.700	45.766	5000	2640	Popov and Masolov (2003)
M-3809	-77.236	43.698	8000	3130	Popov and Masolov (2003)
M-3809	-72.784	58.797	15000	1750	Popov and Masolov (2003)
M-3211	-72.096	56.768	8000	2535	Popov and Masolov (2003)
SAE35	-80.302	45.825	7000	3240	Siegert et al. (2005)
WLK-6	-77.097	144.664	21000	3413	Siegert et al. (2005), Blankenship et al. (2009)
WLK-14	-76.706	145.095	17000	3503	Siegert et al. (2005), Blankenship et al. (2009)
WLK-12	-76.433	144.294	10000	3547	Siegert et al. (2005), Blankenship et al. (2009)
WLK-24	-76.116	144.753	6000	3557	Siegert et al. (2005), Blankenship et al. (2009)
WLK-17	-75.095	126.415	1500	3480	Siegert et al. (2005), Blankenship et al. (2009)
DCS/DCSx/X02b - X02e	-80.413	139.233	2262	3059	Siegert et al. (2005)
DCS/DCSx/X01c	-81.838	120.084	5390	2933	Siegert et al. (2005)
DCS/DCSx/X01d	-80.650	137.545	975	2981	Siegert et al. (2005)
LVS-12	-75.847	117.987	1000	4661	Siegert et al. (2005), Blankenship et al. (2009)
LVS-9	-79.304	88.875	1200	3890	Siegert et al. (2005), Blankenship et al. (2009)
LVS-13	-77.981	91.435	7000	3787	Siegert et al. (2005), Blankenship et al. (2009)
90°E lake	-77.379	91.080	123000	4074	Siegert et al. (2005), Bell et al. (2007)
C25SAE1	-76.750	94.566		3500	Bogorodskiy and Sheremet'yev (1981), Siegert et al. (2005)
C25SAE2	-77.083	94.833		3560	Bogorodskiy and Sheremet'yev (1981), Siegert et al. (2005)
Bindschadler5	-80.610	236.006		2242	Gray et al. (2005), Smith et al. (2009)
Kamb10	-81.446	239.866		2393	Gray et al. (2005), Smith et al. (2009)
L1	-74.000	133.270	6800	4200	Wingham et al. (2006), Wright et al. (2012)
U1	-75.940	135.000		3933	Wingham et al. (2006) downstream filling site
U2	-76.340	135.770		3231	Wingham et al. (2006) downstream filling site
U3	-76.680	135.930		2687	Wingham et al. (2006) downstream filling site
	-78.583	107.131	600	3635	Popov and Masolov (2007), probably the same as one found by Carter et al. (2007)
	-77.232	103.724	700	3720	Near Vostok Subglacial Lake (Popov and Masolov, 2007)
	-77.853	107.531	700	2915	Near Vostok Subglacial Lake (Popov and Masolov, 2007)
	-77.468	107.259	4500	3515	Popov and Masolov (2007), Blankenship et al. (2009)
	-77.301	107.012	1500	3435	Near Vostok Subglacial Lake (Popov and Masolov, 2007)
	-77.199	107.013	5000	3305	Near Vostok Subglacial Lake (Popov and Masolov, 2007)
LVS-8	-76.938	106.696	3800	3540	Popov and Masolov (2007), Blankenship et al. (2009)
	-76.659	106.020	500	3735	Near Vostok Subglacial Lake (Popov and Masolov, 2007)
	-76.596	106.019	500	3400	Near Vostok Subglacial Lake (Popov and Masolov, 2007)
	-78.325	104.593	500	3605	Near Vostok Subglacial Lake (Popov and Masolov, 2007)
	-78.080	107.351	1000	3295	Near Vostok Subglacial Lake (Popov and Masolov, 2007)
	-78.054	107.798	600	3345	Near Vostok Subglacial Lake (Popov and Masolov, 2007)
	-77.666	107.509	1500	2740	Near Vostok Subglacial Lake (Popov and Masolov, 2007)
	-77.602	107.509	600	3135	Near Vostok Subglacial Lake (Popov and Masolov, 2007)
	-77.577	107.508	1800	3100	Near Vostok Subglacial Lake (Popov and Masolov, 2007)
	-77.975	103.985	1000	3280	Near Vostok Subglacial Lake (Popov and Masolov, 2007)
	-78.598	105.368	1200	3600	Near Vostok Subglacial Lake (Popov and Masolov, 2007)
	-78.665	105.859	2000	3320	Near Vostok Subglacial Lake (Popov and Masolov, 2007)
	-77.884	103.617	2100	3650	Near Vostok Subglacial Lake (Popov and Masolov, 2007)
	-77.804	103.757	2300	3740	Near Vostok Subglacial Lake (Popov and Masolov, 2007)
	-76.907	101.962	3100	3715	Near Vostok Subglacial Lake (Popov and Masolov, 2007)
	-76.699	101.433	700	3835	Near Vostok Subglacial Lake (Popov and Masolov, 2007)
	-76.292	101.740	800	3720	Popov and Masolov (2007), Blankenship et al. (2009)
	-78.118	104.299	1700	3190	Near Vostok Subglacial Lake (Popov and Masolov, 2007)
LVS-11	-77.251	106.510	5800	3740	Popov and Masolov (2007), LVS-11 in Blankenship et al. (2009)
	-77.503	103.360	6800	3720	Near Vostok Subglacial Lake (Popov and Masolov, 2007)
	-75.908	103.864	10000	3770	Near Vostok Subglacial Lake (Popov and Masolov, 2007), Blankenship et al. (2009)
	-78.584	104.996	1800	3880	Near Vostok Subglacial Lake (Popov and Masolov, 2007)
	-78.534	105.586	4000	3740	Near Vostok Subglacial Lake (Popov and Masolov, 2007)
Komsomolskoe Subglacial lake	-73.618	97.286	4300	3590	Popov and Masolov (2007)
Pionerskoe Subglacial Lake	-69.746	95.537	9000	2400	Beneath Sovetskaya station (Popov and Masolov, 2007)
WLK-4	-77.421	150.110	35000	2686	Blankenship et al. (2009)
WLK-5	-76.875	148.933	10000	2990	Blankenship et al. (2009)
WLK-7	-77.162	153.715	14000	2712	Blankenship et al. (2009)
WLK-8	-76.999	150.945	10000	2942	Blankenship et al. (2009)
WLK-9	-77.189	150.020	< 4000	2774	Blankenship et al. (2009)
WLK-10	-76.877	150.206	10000	3018	Blankenship et al. (2009)
WLK-11	-77.320	147.754	17000	3025	Blankenship et al. (2009)
WLK-13	-75.764	139.042	6000	2873	Blankenship et al. (2009)
Horseshoe Lake (WLK-15)	-75.226	126.590	18000	3375	Blankenship et al. (2009)
WLK-16	-74.566	126.283	< 4000	3697	Blankenship et al. (2009)
WLK-18	-74.889	127.562	< 4000	3510	Blankenship et al. (2009)
WLK-19	-76.024	137.347	< 4000	2985	Blankenship et al. (2009)
WLK-21	-75.429	126.836	< 4000	3488	Blankenship et al. (2009)
WLK-22	-76.235	136.879	< 4000	2906	Blankenship et al. (2009)
WLK-23	-76.125	137.334	10000	2969	Blankenship et al. (2009)
WLK-26	-76.000	132.375	< 4000	2703	Blankenship et al. (2009)
WLK-27	-75.653	135.747	5000	3442	Blankenship et al. (2009)
WLK-28	-76.368	137.947	7000	2612	Blankenship et al. (2009)
WLK-29	-76.153	143.814	< 4000	3400	Blankenship et al. (2009)
WLK-30	-76.486	146.037	< 4000	3399	Blankenship et al. (2009)
WLK-31	-76.572	138.745	13000	2622	Blankenship et al. (2009)
WLK-32	-76.586	138.457	< 4000	2616	Blankenship et al. (2009)
WLK-33	-77.292	147.243	10000	3062	Blankenship et al. (2009)
WLK-34	-76.796	148.300	< 4000	3175	Blankenship et al. (2009)
WLK-35	-76.672	150.141	12000	3037	Blankenship et al. (2009)
WLK-36	-76.990	149.679	27000	2947	Blankenship et al. (2009)
WLK-37	-76.492	150.473	7000	3050	Blankenship et al. (2009)
WLK-38	-77.084	150.611	< 4000	2900	Blankenship et al. (2009)
WLK-39	-76.902	150.917	< 4000	2917	Blankenship et al. (2009)
WLK-40	-77.278	150.925	22000	2743	Blankenship et al. (2009)
WLK-41	-77.123	151.785	< 4000	2778	Blankenship et al. (2009)
WLK-42	-77.307	152.490	10000	2855	Blankenship et al. (2009)
LVS-1	-75.605	119.230	3900	4095	Blankenship et al. (2009)
LVS-2	-78.661	89.797	3870	3706	Blankenship et al. (2009)
LVS-3	-75.708	118.711	3900	3867	Blankenship et al. (2009)
LVS-4	-77.460	103.322	3880	3664	Blankenship et al. (2009), very near lake 146
LVS-5	-77.682	103.300	3870	3623	Blankenship et al. (2009)
LVS-6	-78.022	108.158	2670	3306	Blankenship et al. (2009)
LVS-14	-77.063	102.101	< 4000	3229	Blankenship et al. (2009)
PPT-1	-89.756	-143.826	28000	2866	Blankenship et al. (2009)
PPT-2	-88.913	-120.388	5000	3095	Blankenship et al. (2009)
PPT-3	-89.853	-86.102	17000	2784	Blankenship et al. (2009)
PPT-4	-85.218	-150.462	11000	1086	Blankenship et al. (2009)
PPT-6	-85.160	-149.740	17000	1134	Blankenship et al. (2009)
PPT-7	-85.078	-144.784	4000	1157	Blankenship et al. (2009), Mercer Ice Stream
PPT-8	-84.974	-141.811	4000	1801	Blankenship et al. (2009), Mercer Ice Stream
PPT-9	-84.900	-150.786	4000	1094	Blankenship et al. (2009), Mercer Ice Stream
PPT-11	-84.750	-150.001	4000	1219	Blankenship et al. (2009), Mercer Ice Stream
PPT-12	-89.898	30.038	4000	2888	Blankenship et al. (2009)
PPT-15	-84.873	-144.123	4000	1654	Blankenship et al. (2009), Mercer Ice Stream
PPT-16 (Lake Mercer)	-84.661	-149.677	9000	1149	Fricker et al. (2007), Blankenship et al. (2009)
PPT-17	-89.482	-13.766	4000	2911	Blankenship et al. (2009)
PPT-18	-88.471	2.279	4000	3241	Blankenship et al. (2009)
PPT-19	-89.210	-150.009	4000	2809	Blankenship et al. (2009)
PPT-20	-88.925	-149.244	4000	2113	Blankenship et al. (2009)
PPT-21	-89.415	-141.194	4000	2476	Blankenship et al. (2009)
PPT-22	-88.312	-140.850	4000	3002	Blankenship et al. (2009), two records <1 km apart
PPT-23	-88.486	-139.780	4000	2990	Blankenship et al. (2009), two records <1 km apart
PPT-25	-89.571	-111.223	4000	3015	Blankenship et al. (2009)
PPT-26	-89.332	-126.286	4000	3032	Blankenship et al. (2009)
PPT-28	-89.613	-103.871	4000	2972	Blankenship et al. (2009)
PPT-29	-89.427	-21.356	4000	2827	Blankenship et al. (2009)
PPT-30	-89.453	-49.283	4000	2959	Blankenship et al. (2009)
PPT-31	-88.505	-128.949	9000	2871	Blankenship et al. (2009)
PPT-32	-89.338	-78.705	4000	2927	Blankenship et al. (2009)
PPT-33	-84.774	-143.117	10000	1150	Blankenship et al. (2009), Mercer Ice Stream
PPT-35	-88.259	7.605	12000	3688	Blankenship et al. (2009)
PPT-36	-89.322	-83.337	4000	2879	Blankenship et al. (2009)
PPT-37	-89.245	-58.470	12000	2870	Blankenship et al. (2009)
PPT-38	-88.964	-13.713	4000	2684	Blankenship et al. (2009)
PPT-39	-89.169	-78.861	4000	3090	Blankenship et al. (2009)
PPT-40	-88.413	-117.809	4000	2742	Blankenship et al. (2009)
PPT-41	-88.609	-110.585	4000	3067	Blankenship et al. (2009)
PPT-42	-89.045	-80.295	4000	2821	Blankenship et al. (2009)
PPT-43	-88.360	-116.897	4000	2768	Blankenship et al. (2009)
PPT-44	-89.036	-43.830	4000	2989	Blankenship et al. (2009)
Recovery A	-82.400	14.280	20000	3500	Bell et al. (2007); Langley et al. (2011)
Recovery B	-82.850	18.130		3500	Bell et al. (2007); Langley et al. (2011)
Recovery C	-84.310	21.370		2687	Bell et al. (2007)
Recovery D	-84.990	21.610		3100	Bell et al. (2007)
Mercer1	-84.602	205.809		839	Fricker et al. (2007)
Whillans1 (Lake Engelhardt)	-83.731	202.581	30000	638	Lake Engelhardt (Fricker et al., 2007)
Whillans2a	-84.035	199.729		759	Fricker et al. (2007)
Whillans2b	-84.343	201.804		763	Fricker et al. (2007)
Whillans3 (Lake Whillans)	-84.240	206.306	5000	798	Fricker et al. (2007); Christianson et al. (2012), Horgan et al. (2012)
Whillans4 (Lake Conway)	-84.374	211.281		886	Fricker et al. (2007)
MacAyeal1/Mac1	-79.950	214.639		994	Smith et al. (2009), Mac1 in Fricker et al. (2010)
MacAyeal2/Mac2	-79.833	215.922		1019	Smith et al. (2009), Mac2 in Fricker et al. (2010)
MacAyeal4	-78.676	227.339		2094	Smith et al. (2009)
Mac3	-80.017	-142.813			Fricker et al. (2010)
Mac4	-79.736	-139.000			Fricker et al. (2010), part of MacAyeal3 in Smith et al. (2009)
Mac5	-79.636	220.891		1141	Fricker et al. (2010), part of MacAyeal3 in Smith et al. (2009)
Byrd1	-81.026	148.302		2032	Stearns et al. (2008)
Byrd2	-80.684	146.887		2161	Stearns et al. (2008)
ITL-19	-75.030	121.560	1460	3187	Cafarella et al. (2006)
ITL-20	-75.060	119.850	1460	3375	Cafarella et al. (2006)
ITL-21	-74.850	121.440	1540	3312	Cafarella et al. (2006)
ITL-22	-75.020	122.170	2440	3062	Cafarella et al. (2006)
ITL-23	-74.070	120.150	9620	3875	Cafarella et al. (2006)
ITL-24	-76.171	128.000	8700	2936	Forieri et al. (2008)
ITL-25	-76.147	127.189	2000	2881	Forieri et al. (2008)
ITL-26	-76.131	126.690	800	2856	Forieri et al. (2008)
ITL-27	-76.127	126.559	800	2910	Forieri et al. (2008)
ITL-28	-76.071	125.058	5600	4300	Forieri et al. (2008)
Academy1	-84.135	298.663		1194	Smith et al. (2009)
Academy2	-84.536	302.555		1700	Smith et al. (2009)
Academy3	-84.608	300.918		1357	Smith et al. (2009)
Academy4	-84.810	304.270		1955	Smith et al. (2009)
Academy5	-84.836	306.300		1972	Smith et al. (2009)
Academy6	-85.316	304.782		1832	Smith et al. (2009)
Academy7	-85.565	306.278		2010	Smith et al. (2009)
Academy8	-85.651	307.068		2064	Smith et al. (2009)
Academy9	-85.865	307.769		2174	Smith et al. (2009)
Academy10	-85.768	309.005		2356	Smith et al. (2009)
Academy11	-85.797	311.592		2595	Smith et al. (2009)
Academy12	-85.712	314.625		2658	Smith et al. (2009)
Academy13	-85.644	317.586		2710	Smith et al. (2009)
Academy14	-85.776	320.431		2559	Smith et al. (2009)
Academy15	-86.023	322.313		2453	Smith et al. (2009)
Academy16	-85.992	324.301		2364	Smith et al. (2009)
Bindschadler1	-80.347	228.497		1855	Smith et al. (2009)
Bindschadler2	-79.945	229.804		2105	Smith et al. (2009)
Bindschadler3	-80.027	233.355		2129	Smith et al. (2009)
Bindschadler4	-80.727	234.428		2178	Smith et al. (2009)
Bindschadler6	-80.567	237.372		2189	Smith et al. (2009)
ByrdS1	-80.337	152.188		1423	Smith et al. (2009)
ByrdS2	-80.762	149.534		1903	Smith et al. (2009)
ByrdS3	-81.804	149.610		1433	Smith et al. (2009)
ByrdS4	-80.750	143.711		2533	Smith et al. (2009)
ByrdS5	-80.577	143.378		2726	Smith et al. (2009)
ByrdS6	-80.324	143.659		2466	Smith et al. (2009)
ByrdS7	-80.034	143.739		2612	Smith et al. (2009)
ByrdS8	-80.012	142.407		2695	Smith et al. (2009)
ByrdS9	-81.467	142.305		2389	Smith et al. (2009)
ByrdS10	-81.830	139.028		2467	Smith et al. (2009)
ByrdS11	-81.466	138.588		2750	Smith et al. (2009)
ByrdS12	-80.900	138.237		2741	Smith et al. (2009), Welch et al. (2009)
ByrdS13	-78.932	142.828		2860	Smith et al. (2009)
ByrdS14	-78.826	139.785		2903	Smith et al. (2009)
ByrdS15	-78.806	138.957		2903	Smith et al. (2009)
CookE1	-71.872	155.337		2766	Smith et al. (2009)
CookE2	-72.803	155.786		2679	Smith et al. (2009)
CookW1	-69.657	149.712		2097	Smith et al. (2009)
CookW2	-70.839	149.379		2781	Smith et al. (2009)
David1	-75.270	157.213		1820	Smith et al. (2009)
David2	-75.332	155.520		1933	Smith et al. (2009)
David3	-75.240	152.918		2299	Smith et al. (2009)
David4	-75.732	152.250		2144	Smith et al. (2009)
David5	-74.879	152.461		2273	Smith et al. (2009)
David6	-75.391	145.239		3320	Smith et al. (2009)
EAP1	-85.839	140.641		2728	Smith et al. (2009)
EAP2	-85.679	135.484		2772	Smith et al. (2009)
EAP3	-85.902	132.796		2952	Smith et al. (2009)
EAP4	-85.912	128.371		3032	Smith et al. (2009)
EAP5	-85.662	124.417		2904	Smith et al. (2009)
EAP6	-85.489	104.036		3190	Smith et al. (2009)
EAP7	-83.967	122.437		3315	Smith et al. (2009)
EAP8	-75.193	109.854		3612	Smith et al. (2009)
EAP9	-75.808	135.558		3584	Smith et al. (2009)
Foundation1	-84.522	286.338		1197	Smith et al. (2009)
Foundation2	-84.984	286.029		1777	Smith et al. (2009)
Foundation3	-85.258	287.207		1601	Smith et al. (2009)
InstituteE1	-82.130	285.509			Smith et al. (2009)
InstituteE2	-82.625	280.987		2044	Smith et al. (2009)
InstituteW1	-81.401	282.455		1754	Smith et al. (2009)
InstituteW2	-81.628	276.421		1495	Smith et al. (2009)
Kamb trunk1	-81.951	219.598		930	Smith et al. (2009)
Kamb1	-82.011	228.796		1396	Smith et al. (2009)
Kamb2	-82.185	230.161		1709	Smith et al. (2009)
Kamb3	-81.938	231.403		1653	Smith et al. (2009)
Kamb4	-81.970	232.558		1755	Smith et al. (2009)
Kamb5	-82.274	232.518		1748	Smith et al. (2009)
Kamb6	-82.058	235.659		2097	Smith et al. (2009)
Kamb7	-81.921	236.560		2243	Smith et al. (2009)
Kamb8	-82.376	236.857		1971	Smith et al. (2009)
Kamb9	-82.321	238.371		2019	Smith et al. (2009)
Kamb11	-81.251	239.859		2489	Smith et al. (2009)
Kamb12	-80.854	242.925		2847	Smith et al. (2009)
Lambert1	-74.000	68.276		1873	Smith et al. (2009)
Lennox-King1	-84.773	157.119		1217	Smith et al. (2009)
Mulock1	-78.091	149.108		2766	Smith et al. (2009)
Ninnis1	-70.887	144.274		3169	Smith et al. (2009)
Nimrod1	-83.488	150.276		1980	Smith et al. (2009)
Nimrod2	-84.325	141.004		3300	Smith et al. (2009), Welch et al. (2009)
Raymond1	-81.352	231.557		1296	Smith et al. (2009)
Recovery1	-81.148	330.924		638	Smith et al. (2009)
Recovery2	-81.319	332.830		695	Smith et al. (2009)
Recovery3	-80.907	335.876		581	Smith et al. (2009)
Recovery4	-81.324	339.948		1320	Smith et al. (2009)
Recovery5	-81.284	350.392		2054	Smith et al. (2009)
Recovery6	-81.429	352.763		2092	Smith et al. (2009)
Recovery7	-81.644	354.021		2141	Smith et al. (2009)
Recovery8	-81.802	355.878		2250	Smith et al. (2009)
Recovery9	-82.914	2.336		2375	Smith et al. (2009)
Recovery10	-83.503	5.941		2455	Smith et al. (2009)
Recovery11	-81.716	8.417		2651	Smith et al. (2009), Langley et al. (2011)
Rutford1	-78.182	275.827		1151	Smith et al. (2009)
Slessor1	-80.037	334.728		293	Smith et al. (2009)
Slessor2	-79.836	338.437		1404	Smith et al. (2009)
Slessor3	-79.924	338.640		1032	Smith et al. (2009)
Slessor4	-79.336	342.915		1847	Smith et al. (2009)
Slessor5	-79.201	342.961		2022	Smith et al. (2009)
Slessor6	-78.770	345.703		1904	Smith et al. (2009)
Slessor7	-79.250	348.950		1976	Smith et al. (2009)
Totten1	-70.103	107.501		2455	Smith et al. (2009)
Totten2	-70.829	110.511	6500	3942	Smith et al. (2009), (Wright et al. (2012)
Vostok1	-77.169	106.834		3739	Smith et al. (2009)
Whillans5	-84.091	213.929		895	Smith et al. (2009)
Whillans6	-83.846	223.086		1358	Smith et al. (2009)
Whillans7	-83.237	226.992		1047	Smith et al. (2009)
Whillans8	-83.504	246.399		2784	Smith et al. (2009)
Wilkes1	-68.812	106.715		3245	Smith et al. (2009)
Wlikes2	-68.703	121.566		2132	Smith et al. (2009)
	-82.000	11.650	8000		Langley et al. (2011)
R03Wa_1	-70.433	130.399	2150	3910	slightly fuzzy, RHS of valley, confused layers
R04Ea_9	-71.621	135.005	3500	2790	Wright et al. (2012)
R05Ea_4	-71.666	128.119	750	3284	Wright et al. (2012)
R05Ea_5	-71.843	129.055	1950	3750	Wright et al. (2012)
R06Wa_4	-72.884	127.041	1000	3869	Wright et al. (2012)
R07Ea_9	-73.438	126.023	1250	3707	Wright et al. (2012)
R07Ta_1	-73.814	125.655	1800	3644	Wright et al. (2012)
R08Wa_0.1	-74.291	122.585	3350	3745	Wright et al. (2012)
R08Wa_0.2	-74.300	122.503	1200	3709	Wright et al. (2012)
R13Ea_8	-75.981	106.045	3500	3521	Wright et al. (2012)
R15Ea_4	-74.084	100.818	1800	3523	Wright et al. (2012)
“Site A”	-67.800	112.540			N. Young (personal comm.)
“Site B”	-67.870	113.530			N. Young (personal comm.)
“Site C”	-67.840	114.040			N. Young (personal comm.)
