= Subglacial stream =

Subglacial streams are conduits of glacial meltwater that flow at the base of glaciers and ice caps. Meltwater from the glacial surface travels downward throughout the glacier, forming an englacial drainage system consisting of a network of passages that eventually reach the bedrock below, where they form subglacial streams. Subglacial streams form a system of tunnels and interlinked cavities and conduits, with water flowing under extreme pressures from the ice above; as a result, flow direction is determined by the pressure gradient from the ice and the topography of the bed rather than gravity. Subglacial streams form a dynamic system that is responsive to changing conditions, and the system can change significantly in response to seasonal variation in meltwater and temperature. Water from subglacial streams is routed towards the glacial terminus, where it exits the glacier. Discharge from subglacial streams can have a significant impact on local, and in some cases global, environmental and geological conditions. Sediments, nutrients, and organic matter contained in the meltwater can all influence downstream and marine conditions. Climate change may have a significant impact on subglacial stream systems, increasing the volume of meltwater entering subglacial drainage systems and influencing their hydrology.

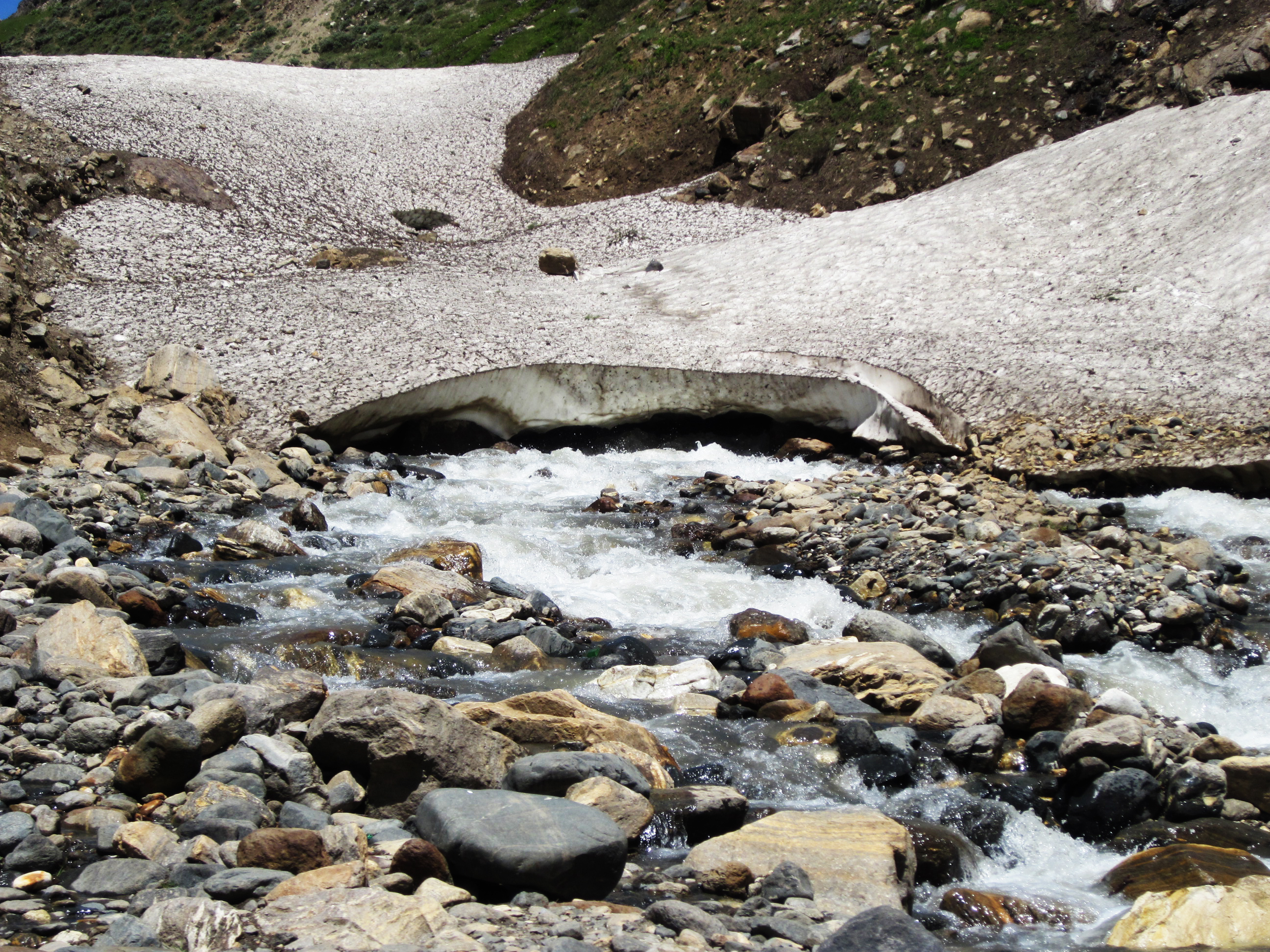
Example of a subglacial stream in Naran Valley, Pakistan (2013)

== Formation ==
Subglacial streams derive their water from two sources: meltwater transported from the top of the glacier and meltwater from the glacial bed. When temperatures are high enough to induce melting on the surface of the glacier, typically during summer, water flows down into the glacier. Surface meltwater flows downward through millimeter-sized channels that join in a network of tributaries, growing in size until reaching the bedrock. Additionally, some water is transported to the surface by moulins (large, vertical shafts up to ten meters wide that range from the surface to a lower elevation, sometimes all the way to the glacial bed). Fractures, crevasses, and cavities between glaciers and valley walls can also provide pathways for water to reach the bed. While surface meltwater can be seasonally dependent, the beds of temperate glaciers are maintained at the pressure melting point (the combination of temperature and pressure at which ice melts). This liquid water at the bed—present in temperate but not polar glaciers—provides a constant input of water to subglacial stream systems. Water from these two sources meets and is concentrated at the bedrock base of the glacier, where pressure from the ice above forces it to move towards the glacial terminus, creating a network of passageways as it works its way out of the glacier.

== Hydrology ==
=== Direction of Streams ===
Water in subglacial streams is subject to large amounts of pressure from the mass of ice above; as a result, the direction of water flow cannot be explained in the same way as typical surface streams. Subglacial water flow is, to a large extent, determined by pressure gradients created by the weight and movement of the glacier. As a result, instead of following the slope of the bed, streams can flow up and across slopes. This behavior can be described by viewing the pressure inside glaciers as equipotential surfaces; as the water is pushed from areas of high pressure to areas of low pressure, it travels in a direction normal to these surfaces.

=== Stream Systems ===
Subglacial stream systems can be placed in two categories based upon the arrangement and type of passages that make up the system: channelized and distributed.

==== Channelized ====
Channelized drainage systems are characterized by water flowing predominantly through tunnels along the bed of the glacier that take meltwater rapidly and directly to the glacial terminus. These tunnels are arranged in a network of tributaries, joining and growing in size as they near the terminus. Water is fast-moving in these systems, and pressure inside the channels is relatively low compared to pressure in the ice around them. Turbulence in the rapid flow produces heat, which is able to melt the ice walls of the tunnels. While the total water added to the system by this process is insignificant compared to water from the surface and from basal melting, the melting of the channel walls allows the channel to remain open even when the ice pressures surrounding it are much greater than the pressure of the water inside. The constant erosion of the tunnel walls is able to offset the narrowing of the tunnel caused by deformation of the ice. Depending on the water supply and the characteristics of the bed, the tunnels can take different forms, including semicircular tunnels cutting into the ice, broad and low tunnels, and tunnels that cut into the bed rather than the ice. Broad and low tunnels form in channels with variable amounts of meltwater, as melting is concentrated on the tunnel walls rather than the ceiling when the tunnel is not completely full of water. Channels that maintain long-term stability in water flow and location can erode the bedrock over time, resulting in tunnels that cut into the bed rather than the ice above.

==== Distributed ====
Distributed drainage systems can consist of a network of linked cavities, porous flow and canals in the sediment, and a thin film between the ice and bed. Films of water between the ice and bedrock form are rarely thicker than tens of micrometers, and form in areas that are isolated from channels and cavities, maintained at the pressure melting point, and are above impermeable bed. Flow in films does not account for a large amount of the total meltwater flux out of the glacier, but may be important in the sliding movement of glaciers. In cases in which glaciers are above porous, unconsolidated sediment, some water can flow through the sediment; like film flow, porous flow does not account for much of the water flux in the system. When the bed is deformable, wide, shallow canals up to 10 cm in width can form in the surface of the sediment, topped by the glacial ice. In glaciers with steep slopes, canal systems are unstable, as they can be easily absorbed by channels above the sediment. As glaciers move over bumps in the bedrock, differences in pressure can separate the ice from the bed behind the bump if the glacier is moving fast enough. This creates cavities between the glacier and the bed, which fill with water. If the water pressure is high enough, the cavity expands, and the water can cause more separation between the ice and bed surrounding the cavity. With sustained water supply, small passages form between cavities, creating a large network of linked cavities which water flows between. Water in linked cavity systems flows, on average, in a direction normal to the equipotential surfaces of pressure in the glacier. However, the path taken is long and indirect, and at times water can be flowing nearly parallel to the equipotential surfaces.

=== Seasonal Variability ===
The structure of subglacial stream systems changes significantly over time as a result of seasonal changes in the volume and source of meltwater input. During the winter, subglacial stream systems are dominated by distributed streams. As there is very little surface melting during this season, nearly all meltwater is derived from basal melting and the release of stored meltwater. Both of these sources involve small amounts of water released relatively uniformly throughout the bed of the glacier, making them unlikely to form large drainage channels. Some major tunnels remain in the system year-round, and are the main points of discharge during the winter, but the system at large is characterized by distributed drainage. As temperatures rise and surface melting increases water flux to the bed in late spring, the winter stream system is disrupted. Distributed flow channels, lacking the capacity for increased volumes of meltwater, experience a rise in water pressure and are destabilized. High water pressures lead to the formation of larger tunnels—a process known as channelization—that have a greater capacity for meltwater and allow for pressures to fall. This change can happen gradually or can be triggered by events that rapidly increase meltwater flow, such as consecutive days of high melting or a large rainstorm. The now-channelized system grows in extent throughout the summer as meltwater input continues to increase, with new passages forming and growing in size. In autumn, surface melting decreases, and the volume of meltwater is no longer sufficient to maintain the newly formed channels; deformation of the surrounding ice slowly closes channels that do not generate enough frictional melting along their walls to offset the closure. Eventually, a distributed stream system again becomes dominant. Some perennial channels remain throughout the winter season, but the channels formed in spring disappear—when new tunnels form again the next year, they do not form in the same locations as the ones that closed.

== Impact on Glacial Systems ==
=== Submarine Glacial Melt ===
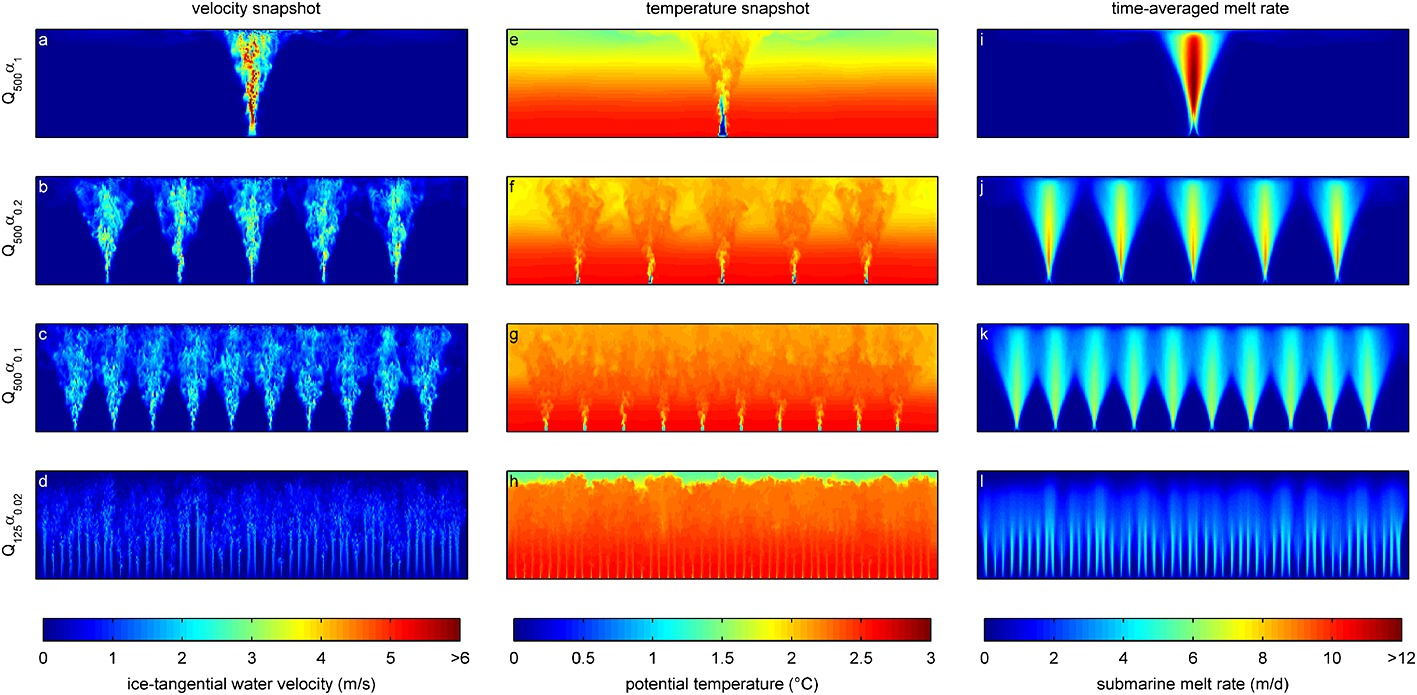
Modeled velocity and temperature of discharge and submarine melt rate with a varying number and size of plumes.

The discharge of subglacial stream systems of marine-terminating glaciers into the ocean has a significant impact on the volume and distribution of glacial melt at the terminus. The discharge of glacial streams into the ocean emerges as plumes that travel up to the ocean surface along the face of the glacier, which can serve as heat sources for glacial melt. Ice melt due to discharge plumes has a significant impact in areas in which discharge rates exceed 100 m^{3}/s^{−1}; with lesser discharge rates, plume-associated heat is insignificant compared to the effects of ocean mixing. Seasonal variability plays an important role in the way that subglacial streams influence glacial melting. During the summer, subglacial stream output is much greater, resulting in plumes that are larger, faster, and more buoyant than during the winter. In addition to the greater volume of discharge increasing glacial melt, the increased buoyancy of the plume results in more turbulence and, consequently, more heat transfer to the glacier, further increasing melt. The effect subglacial stream discharge has on glacial melt is also influenced by the type of subglacial drainage system; distributed subglacial streams result in an output of meltwater uniformly across the grounding line (where the glacier transitions from grounded to floating ice), whereas channelized drainage results in individual, large outlets. Distributed discharge results in glacial melt volumes up to five times greater than that of channelized drainage, as individual strong plumes of meltwater are not as capable of inducing widespread melting as a much greater number of smaller outputs.

=== Glacial Motion ===
In temperate glaciers, which are characterized by the presence of liquid water at their base and are able to slide, subglacial streams have a significant impact on glacial movement. The water pressure and friction experienced at the base of a glacier depends in part on whether the subglacial hydrological system is channelized or distributed. Channelized systems are an efficient form of drainage as they are able to rapidly move water out of the glacier, reducing water pressure in the system. By decreasing water pressure underneath the glacier, friction between the glacier ice and the bedrock below increases, slowing the movement of the glacier. Distributed flow systems, contrastingly, are characterized by slow-moving water in small cavities and passages; when water flux into the system increases, such as during periods of high melt, the system is unable to compensate, resulting in large increases in basal water pressure. As a result, friction between the glacier and the bed is reduced, and glacial sliding speed increases. Glacial motion can also cause changes in subglacial stream systems, and there are feedbacks present between the two. As subglacial water pressure increases, the speed of glacial sliding increases. The glacier encounters bumps in the bedrock as it slides: as a result, cavities are created between the ice and the bed. The glacier encounters more bumps due to its higher speed and, since ice moving at a higher speed is less able to maintain connection with the bedrock, faster moving glaciers are more likely to form cavities when passing over bumps. This increases the subglacial space which can be filled with water, decreasing basal water pressure. The interaction between glacial motion and subglacial hydrology creates a negative feedback loop, in which increased water pressure below the glacier increases glacial sliding speed, which in turn decreases pressure and, consequently, sliding speed. Through this mechanism, the effects of speedup events can decay over time. Another control on glacial sliding speed is the process of channelization. Sustained high levels of meltwater input result in a shift from a distributed network of subglacial streams to a more channelized system as larger passages through the ice develop. As larger channels are able to more efficiently remove water from the subglacial system, water pressure decreases, increasing friction between the glacier and the bedrock and decreasing sliding speed. Channelization is the most significant process in terminating speedup events, and is responsible for the slowdown in glacial speed at the end of summer following the speedup commonly observed as meltwater flow increases in spring.

== Material Transport ==
=== Nutrients and Organic Matter ===
Subglacial streams carry a significant amount of organic matter and nutrients, originating both from supraglacial meltwater and subglacial processes. Meltwater from supraglacial environments containing microbially-produced dissolved organic carbon, or DOC, flows into glaciers, eventually reaching subglacial stream systems, which carry the organic matter out of the glacier. This source of DOC is supplemented by organic matter produced within subglacial ecosystems, where there are diverse microbial communities. Though the concentration of dissolved organic matter in glacial meltwater is low, the sheer amount of freshwater discharge from glaciers makes glacially-sourced DOC an important source of bioavailable carbon to marine ecosystems. In the Gulf of Alaska alone, glacial runoff provides 0.13 Tg of organic carbon per year, much of which travels through subglacial streams. Subglacial streams also transport various other important nutrients. Geological processes, including the grinding of glaciers on the bedrock below and water-rock interaction, ensure that minerals are continuously fed into the subglacial system. Iron transported by subglacial streams, for example, is mostly sourced from subglacial weathering, and may be responsible for an Fe flux large enough to significantly influence global ocean chemistry over geological timescales. Biological processes also provide nutrients to subglacial streams, with nitrification and denitrification by microbes affecting downstream communities during periods of melt.

=== Sediment ===
Subglacial streams can transport, deposit, and remove sediment from the glacier bed; this process is influenced by water supply and the amount and characteristics of the available sediment. The size of sediment particles, the slope of the subglacial stream's channel, and the roughness of the bed all contribute to whether sediment is mobilized or deposited. Subglacial flooding events can result in significant erosion and sediment transport, and studies modeling subglacial channels suggest that seasonal meltwater flow alone can erode bedrock and transport sediment as large as boulders. Contrastingly, when water pressure is low, such as at the end of a melt season, sediment is deposited. When sediment supply is high enough, the sediment deposition can form an esker: an elongated ridge of sediment that fills the channel of the subglacial stream in which it forms. These eskers can be temporary, lasting only until increasing water pressure during the next melt season flushes out the sediment, or they could be permanent. The permanent formation of eskers is more common in retreating glaciers and ice sheets, as their termini are thinning, which favors the deposition of sediment. Advancing glaciers and ice sheets exhibit steepening termini, which increases shear stresses and, consequently, water pressure, which favors the flushing of deposited sediment out of stream channels.

== Climate Change ==
Anthropogenic climate change is likely to cause significant changes in subglacial stream systems. As glacial melting increases as a result of rising global temperatures, water flux into and discharge from subglacial streams increases as well. Greater water input from surface melting may affect the hydrology of subglacial systems, changing the timing of seasonal variations. As a result of climate change-induced increases in meltwater, greater volumes of water are likely to reach the bed earlier in the year. This would cause the transition from winter distributed subglacial drainage to summer channelized streams to occur earlier in the year. Glacial motion could also be affected: since glaciers dominated by channelized systems have lesser sliding speeds, the earlier transition to this system could result in slower moving glaciers. However, short-term fluctuations in meltwater volume and pressure, which may become more intense as runoff increases, could offset this decrease in sliding by causing localized speedups. Increases in the volume of discharge from subglacial streams are likely to increase the melting of marine-terminating glaciers, as submarine melt rates are highly sensitive to the amount of subglacial discharge.
