= Hodgson Lake =

- Location within Antarctica
- Location: Alexander Island
- Coordinates: 72°01′S 68°28′W
- Type: oligotrophic lake
- Basin countries: (Antarctica)
- Max. depth: 90 m (295 ft) (est.)

Hodgson Lake is a perennially ice-covered freshwater lake, which is about 2 km (1.2 mi) long by about 1.5 km (0.93 mi) wide. It is located within the southern part of Alexander Island, west of Palmer Land in Antarctica, at approximately 72°S latitude and 68°W longitude. This lake has a 93.4 m (306 ft) deep water column that lies sealed beneath a 3.6 to 4.0 m (12 to 13 ft) thick perennial lake ice. The lake is an ultra-oligotrophic lake with very low nutrient content and very low productivity. There is no detectable life living in Hodgson Lake. The lake extends eastward into George VI Sound and the George VI Ice Shelf making it adjacent to the sound. The northern side of this lake is bounded by the Saturn Glacier, which flows east into George VI Sound. The lake lies next to and southeast of Citadel Bastion, a pre-eminent mountain on Alexander Island.

Geomorphological and paleolimnological evidence indicates that Hodgson Lake had been a subglacial lake covered by an ice sheet at least 470 m (1,542 ft) thick during the Last Glacial Maximum. This ice sheet started thinning about 13,500 years ago. Eventually, it retreated from the local area of Hodgson Lake and left it covered only by perennial ice sometime before 11,000 years ago. This lake has been covered by perennial ice since then.

The UK Antarctic Place-Names Committee named Lake Hodgson on 20 November 2007, after Dominic Hodgson, a British Antarctic Survey paleolimnologist and lead author of the discovery reports. Although he proposed that this lake be named "Citadel Lake," it was named after him. Dr. Hodgson confirmed the existence of this lake during a field reconnaissance on 18 December 2000. Later in 2009, papers, of which Dominic Hodgson is the senior coauthor, were published about the limnology and paleolimnology of Hodgson Lake in Quaternary Science Reviews.

== See also ==
- Lake Ellsworth
- Lake Vostok
- Lakes of Antarctica
