= Subglacial lake =

Lake under a glacier

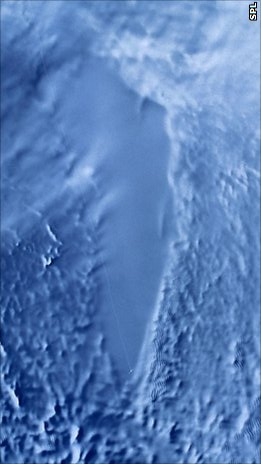
Satellite image of subglacial Lake Vostok in Antarctica. Image credit: NASA

A subglacial lake is a lake that is found under a glacier, typically beneath an ice cap or ice sheet. Subglacial lakes form at the boundary between ice and the underlying bedrock, where liquid water can exist above the lower melting point of ice under high pressure. Over time, the overlying ice gradually melts at a rate of a few millimeters per year. Meltwater flows from regions of high to low hydraulic pressure under the ice and pools, creating a body of liquid water that can be isolated from the external environment for millions of years.

Since the first discoveries of subglacial lakes under the Antarctic Ice Sheet, more than 400 subglacial lakes have been discovered in Antarctica, beneath the Greenland Ice Sheet, and under Iceland's Vatnajökull ice cap. Subglacial lakes contain a substantial proportion of Earth's liquid freshwater, with the volume of Antarctic subglacial lakes alone estimated to be about 10,000 km^{3}, or about 15% of all liquid freshwater on Earth.

As ecosystems isolated from Earth's atmosphere, subglacial lakes are influenced by interactions between ice, water, sediments, and organisms. They contain active biological communities of extremophilic microbes that are adapted to cold, low-nutrient conditions and facilitate biogeochemical cycles independent of energy inputs from the sun. Subglacial lakes and their inhabitants are of particular interest in the field of astrobiology and the search for extraterrestrial life.

== Physical characteristics ==
The water in subglacial lakes remains liquid since geothermal heating balances the heat loss at the ice surface. The pressure from the overlying glacier causes the melting point of water to be below 0 °C. The ceiling of the subglacial lake will be at the level where the pressure melting point of water intersects with the temperature gradient. Very thick ice gives rise to a relatively high temperature at the bottom. For example, Lake Vostok, the largest Antarctic subglacial lake, is located in a basin and is covered by ice nearly 4000 metres thick, much thicker than the ice sheet around it. Hypersaline subglacial lakes remain liquid due to their salt content.

Not all lakes with permanent ice cover can be called subglacial, as some are covered by regular lake ice. Some examples of perennially ice-covered lakes include Lake Bonney and Lake Hoare in Antarctica's McMurdo Dry Valleys as well as Lake Hodgson, a former subglacial lake.

=== Hydrostatic seals ===
The water in a subglacial lake in a basin can have a "floating level" far above the ground threshold, the level at which fluid would be able of escape the basin. The floating level can be thought of as the water level in a hole drilled through the ice into the lake. It is equivalent to the level that water around it would be at if it were a normal ice shelf. The ceiling can therefore be conceived as an ice shelf that is grounded along its entire perimeter, which explains why it has been called a captured ice shelf. As it moves over the lake, it enters the lake at the floating line, and it leaves the lake at the grounding line.

If the floating level is above the ground threshold then the water must be trapped by a sort of hydrostatic seal—the ice surrounding the lake is pressed to the ground by its own weight hard enough to create a seal preventing water from escaping. A hydrostatic seal is created when the ice is so much higher around the lake that the equipotential surface dips down into impermeable ground. Water from underneath this ice rim is then pressed back into the lake by the hydrostatic seal. The ice rim in Lake Vostok has been estimated to a mere 7 meters, while the floating level is about 3 kilometers above the lake ceiling. If the hydrostatic seal is penetrated when the floating level is high, the water will start flowing out in a jökulhlaup. Due to melting of the channel the discharge increases exponentially, unless other processes allow the discharge to increase even faster. Due to the high hydraulic head that can be achieved in some subglacial lakes, jökulhlaups may reach very high rates of discharge. Catastrophic drainage from subglacial lakes is a known hazard in Iceland, as volcanic activity can create enough meltwater to overwhelm ice dams and lake seals and cause glacial outburst flooding.

=== Influence on glacier movement ===
The role of subglacial lakes on ice dynamics is unclear. Certainly on the Greenland Ice Sheet subglacial water acts to enhance basal ice motion in a complex manner. The "Recovery Lakes" beneath Antarctica's Recovery Glacier lie at the head of a major ice stream and may influence the dynamics of the region. A modest (10%) speed up of Byrd Glacier in East Antarctica may have been influenced by a subglacial drainage event. The flow of subglacial water is known in downstream areas where ice streams are known to migrate, accelerate or stagnate on centennial time scales and highlights that subglacial water may be discharged over the ice sheet grounding line.

== History and expeditions ==
Russian revolutionary and scientist Peter A. Kropotkin first proposed the idea of liquid freshwater under the Antarctic Ice Sheet at the end of the 19th century. He suggested that due to the geothermal heating at the bottom of the ice sheets, the temperature beneath the ice could reach the ice melt temperature, which would be below zero. The notion of freshwater beneath ice sheets was further advanced by Russian glaciologist Igor A. Zotikov, who demonstrated via theoretical analysis the possibility of a decrease in Antarctic ice because of melting of ice at a lower surface. As of 2019, there are over 400 subglacial lakes in Antarctica, and it is suspected that there is a possibility of more. Subglacial lakes have also been discovered in Greenland, Iceland, and northern Canada.

=== Early exploration ===
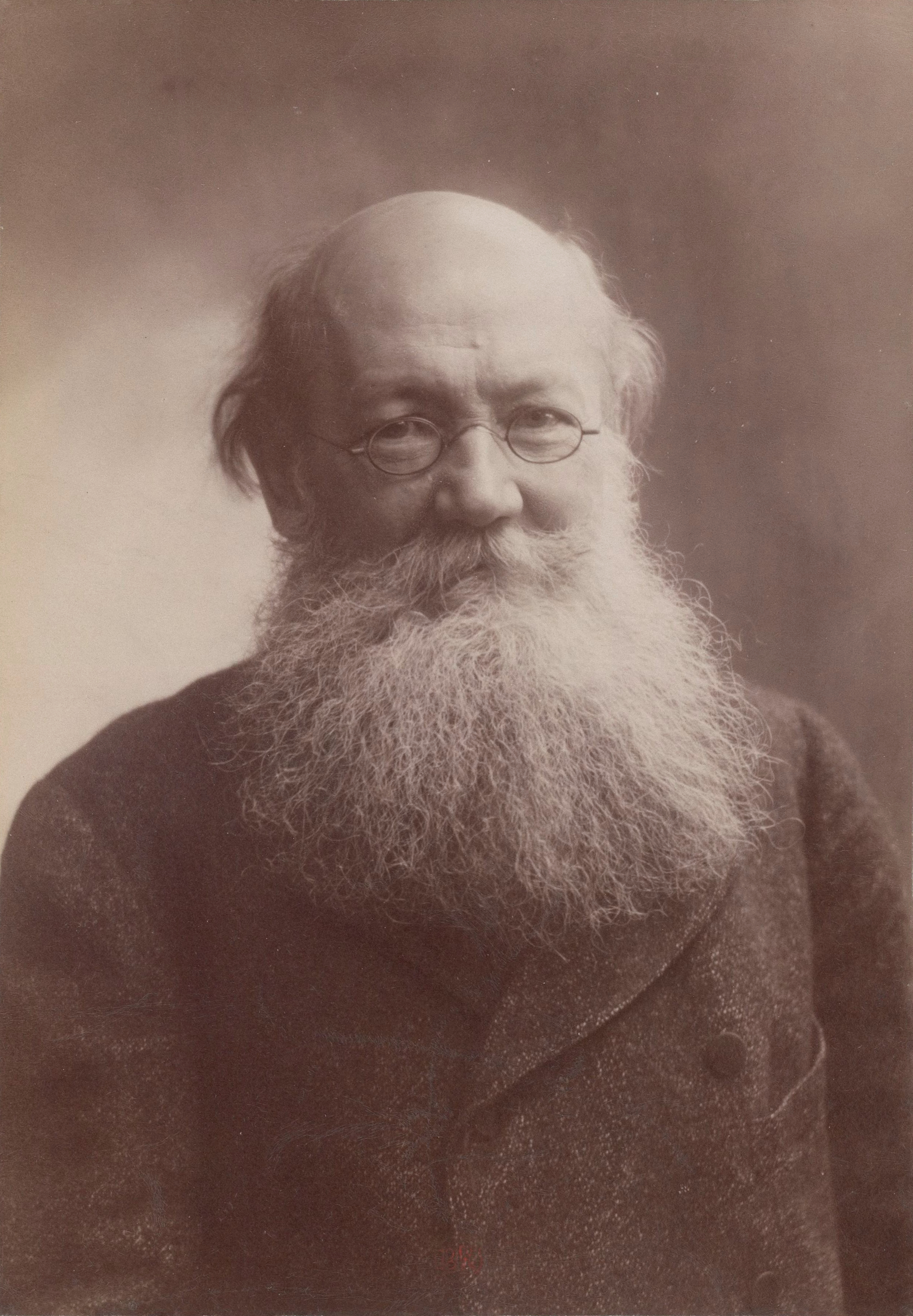
Russian scientist Peter Kropotkin first proposed the idea of fresh water under Antarctic ice.

Scientific advances in Antarctica can be attributed to several major periods of collaboration and cooperation, such as the four International Polar Years (IPY) in 1882-1883, 1932-1933, 1957-1958, and 2007-2008. The success of the 1957-1958 IPY led to the establishment of the Scientific Committee on Antarctic Research (SCAR) and the Antarctic Treaty System, paving the way to formulate a better methodology and process to observe subglacial lakes.

In 1959 and 1964, during two of his four Soviet Antarctic Expeditions, Russian geographer and explorer Andrey P. Kapitsa used seismic sounding to prepare a profile of the layers of the geology below Vostok Station in Antarctica. The original intent of this work was to conduct a broad survey of the Antarctic Ice Sheet. The data collected on these surveys, however, was used 30 years later and led to the discovery of Lake Vostok as a subglacial lake.

Beginning in the late 1950s, English physicists Stan Evans and Gordon Robin began using the radioglaciology technique of radio-echo sounding (RES) to chart ice thickness. Subglacial lakes are identified by (RES) data as continuous and specular reflectors which dip against the ice surface at around x10 of the surface slope angle, as this is required for hydrostatic stability. In the late 1960s, they were able to mount RES instruments on aircraft and acquire data for the Antarctic Ice Sheet. Between 1971 and 1979, the Antarctic Ice Sheet was profiled extensively using RES equipment. The technique of using RES is as follows: 50-meter deep holes are drilled to increase the signal-to-noise ratio in the ice. A small explosion sets off a sound wave, which travels through the ice. This sound wave is reflected and then recorded by the instrument. The time it takes for the wave to travel down and back is noted and converted to a distance using the known speed of sound in ice. RES records can identify subglacial lakes via three specific characteristics: 1) an especially strong reflection from the ice-sheet base, stronger than adjacent ice-bedrock reflections; 2) echoes of constant strength occurring along the track, which indicate that the surface is very smooth; and 3) a very flat and horizontal character with slopes less than 1%. Using this approach, 17 subglacial lakes were documented by Kapista and his team. RES also led to the discovery of the first subglacial lake in Greenland and revealed that these lakes are interconnected.

Systematic profiling, using RES, of the Antarctic Ice Sheet took place again between 1971–1979. During this time, a US-UK-Danish collaboration was able to survey about 40% of East Antarctica and 80% of West Antarctica – further defining the subglacial landscape and the behavior of ice flow over the lakes.

=== Satellite exploration ===
In the early 1990s, radar altimeter data from the European Remote-Sensing Satellite (ERS-1) provided detailed mapping of Antarctica through 82 degrees south. This imaging revealed a flat surface around the northern border of Lake Vostok, and the data collected from ERS-1 further built the geographical distribution of Antarctic subglacial lakes.

In 2005, Laurence Gray and a team of glaciologists began to interpret surface ice slumping and raising from RADARSAT data, which indicated there could be hydrologically "active" subglacial lakes subject to water movement.

Between 2003 and 2009, a survey of long-track measurements of ice-surface elevation using the ICESat satellite as a part of NASA's Earth Observing System produced the first continental-scale map of the active subglacial lakes in Antarctica. In 2009, it was revealed that Lake Cook is the most hydrologically active subglacial lake on the Antarctic continent. Other satellite imagery has been used to monitor and investigate this lake, including ICESat, CryoSat-2, the Advanced Spaceborne Thermal Emission and Reflection Radiometer, and SPOT5.

Gray et al. (2005) interpreted ice surface slumping and raising from RADARSAT data as evidence for subglacial lakes filling and emptying - termed "active" lakes. Wingham et al. (2006) used radar altimeter (ERS-1) data to show coincident uplift and subsidence, implying drainage between lakes. NASA's ICESat satellite was key in developing this concept further and subsequent work demonstrated the pervasiveness of this phenomenon. ICESat ceased measurements in 2007 and the detected "active" lakes were compiled by Smith et al. (2009) who identified 124 such lakes. The realisation that lakes were interconnected created new contamination concerns for plans to drill into lakes (see the Sampling expeditions section below).

Several lakes were delineated by the famous SPRI-NSF-TUD surveys undertaken until the mid-seventies. Since this original compilation several smaller surveys has discovered many more subglacial lakes throughout Antarctica, notably by Carter et al. (2007), who identified a spectrum of subglacial lake types based on their properties in (RES) datasets.

=== Sampling expeditions ===
In March 2010, the sixth international conference on subglacial lakes was held at the American Geophysical Union Chapman Conference in Baltimore. The conference allowed engineers and scientists to discuss the equipment and strategies used in ice drilling projects, such as the design of hot-water drills, equipment for water measurement and sampling and sediment recovery, and protocols for experimental cleanliness and environmental stewardship. Following this meeting, SCAR drafted a code of conduct for ice drilling expeditions and in situ (on-site) measurements and sampling of subglacial lakes. This code of conduct was ratified at the Antarctic Treaty Consultative Meeting (ATCM) of 2011. By the end of 2011, three separate subglacial lake drilling exploration missions were scheduled to take place.

In February 2012, Russian ice-core drilling at Lake Vostok accessed the subglacial lake for the first time. Lake water flooded the borehole and froze during the winter season, and the sample of re-frozen lake water (accretion ice) was recovered in the following summer season of 2013. In December 2012, scientists from the UK attempted to access Lake Ellsworth with a clean access hot-water drill; however, the mission was called off because of equipment failure. In January 2013, the US-led Whillans Ice Stream Subglacial Access Research Drilling (WISSARD) expedition measured and sampled Lake Whillans in West Antarctica for microbial life. On 28 December 2018, the Subglacial Antarctic Lakes Scientific Access (SALSA) team announced they had reached Lake Mercer after melting their way through 1,067 m (3,501 ft) of ice with a high-pressure hot-water drill. The team collected water samples and bottom sediment samples down to 6 meters deep.

== Distribution ==
=== Antarctica ===
The majority of the nearly 400 Antarctic subglacial lakes are located in the vicinity of ice divides, where large subglacial drainage basins are overlain by ice sheets. The largest is Lake Vostok with other lakes notable for their size being Lake Concordia and Aurora Lake. An increasing number of lakes are also being identified near ice streams. An altimeter survey by the ERS-2 satellite orbiting the East Antarctic Ice Sheet from 1995 to 2003 indicated clustered anomalies in ice sheet elevation indicating that the East Antarctic lakes are fed by a subglacial system that transports basal meltwater through subglacial streams.

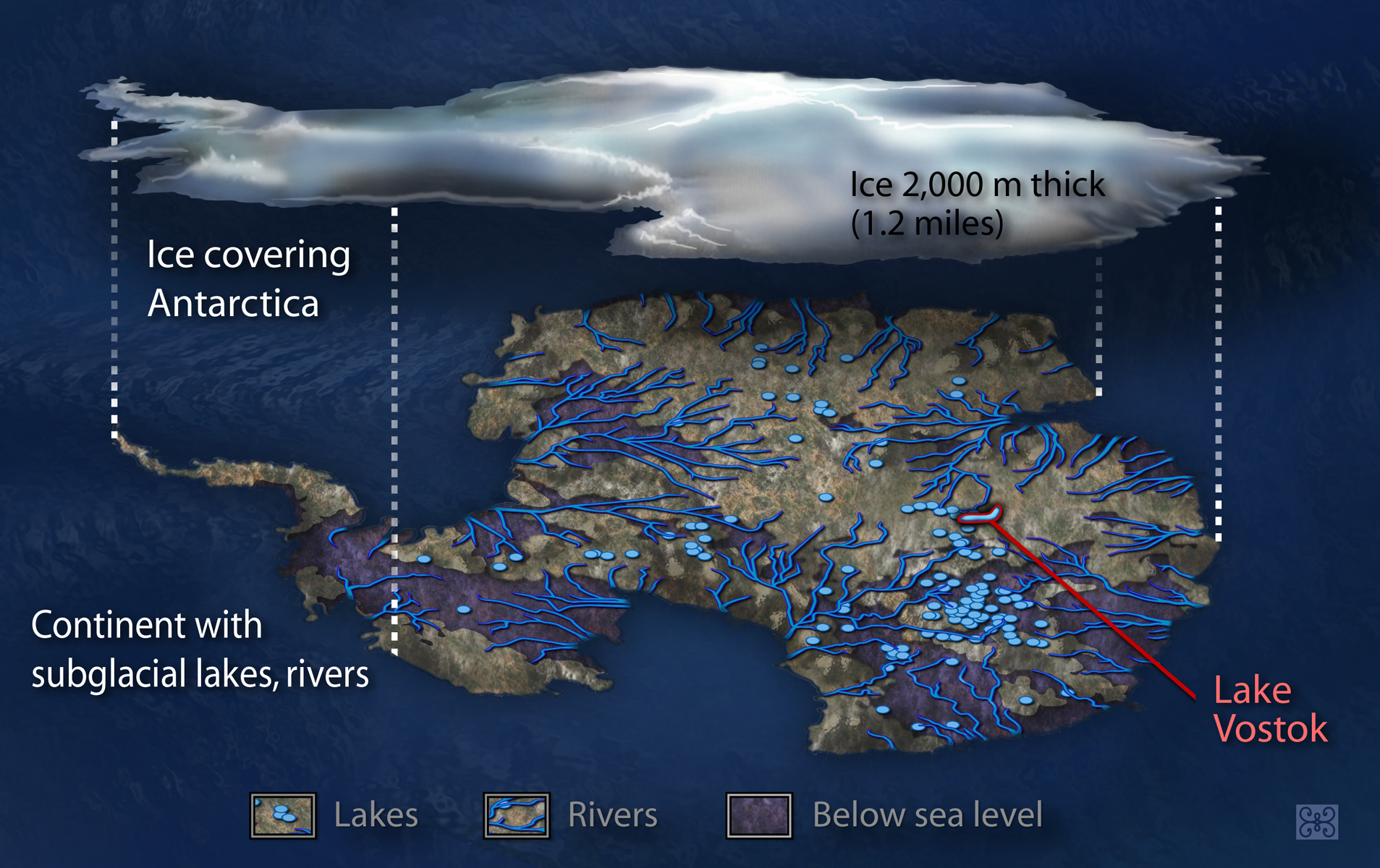
An artist's depiction of the subglacial lakes and rivers beneath the Antarctic Ice Sheet. Image credit: Zina Deretsky / US National Science Foundation

The largest Antarctic subglacial lakes are clustered in the Dome C-Vostok area of East Antarctica, possibly due to the thick insulating ice and rugged, tectonically influenced subglacial topography. In West Antarctica, subglacial Lake Ellsworth is situated within the Ellsworth Mountains and is relatively small and shallow. The Siple Coast Ice Streams, also in West Antarctica, overlie numerous small subglacial lakes, including Lakes Whillans, Engelhardt, Mercer, Conway, accompanied by their lower neighbours called Lower Conway (LSLC) and Lower Mercer (LSLM). Glacial retreat at the margins of the Antarctic Ice Sheet has revealed several former subglacial lakes, including Progress Lake in East Antarctica and Hodgson Lake on southern Alexander Island near the Antarctic Peninsula.

=== Greenland ===
The existence of subglacial lakes beneath the Greenland Ice Sheet has only become evident within the last decade. Radio-echo sounding measurements have revealed two subglacial lakes in the northwest section of the ice sheet. These lakes are likely recharged with water from the drainage of nearby supraglacial lakes rather than from melting of basal ice. Another potential subglacial lake has been identified near the southwestern margin of the ice sheet, where a circular depression beneath the ice sheet evidences recent drainage of the lake caused by climate warming. Such drainage, coupled with heat transfer to the base of the ice sheet through the storage of supraglacial meltwater, is thought to influence the rate of ice flow and overall behavior of the Greenland Ice Sheet.

=== Iceland ===
Much of Iceland is volcanically active, resulting in significant meltwater production beneath its two ice caps. This meltwater also accumulates in basins and ice cauldrons, forming subglacial lakes. These lakes act as a transport mechanism for heat from geothermal vents to the bottom of the ice caps, which often results in melting of basal ice that replenishes any water lost from drainage. The majority of Icelandic subglacial lakes are located beneath the Vatnajökull and Mýrdalsjökull ice caps, where melting from hydrothermal activity creates permanent depressions that fill with meltwater. Catastrophic drainage from subglacial lakes is a known hazard in Iceland, as volcanic activity can create enough meltwater to overwhelm ice dams and lake seals and cause glacial outburst flooding.

Grímsvötn is perhaps the best known subglacial lake beneath the Vatnajökull ice cap. Other lakes beneath the ice cap lie within the Skatfá, Pálsfjall and Kverkfjöll cauldrons. Notably, subglacial lake Grímsvötn's hydraulic seal remained intact until 1996, when significant meltwater production from the Gjálp eruption resulted in uplift of Grímsvötn's ice dam.

The Mýrdalsjökull ice cap, another key subglacial lake location, sits on top of an active volcano-caldera system in the southernmost part of the Katla volcanic system. Hydrothermal activity beneath the Mýrdalsjökull ice cap is thought to have created at least 12 small depressions within an area constrained by three major subglacial drainage basins. Many of these depressions are known to contain subglacial lakes that are subject to massive, catastrophic drainage events from volcanic eruptions, creating a significant hazard for nearby human populations.

=== Canada ===
Until very recently, only former subglacial lakes from the last glacial period had been identified in Canada. These paleo-subglacial lakes likely occupied valleys created before the advance of the Laurentide Ice Sheet during the Last Glacial Maximum. However, two subglacial lakes were identified via RES in bedrock troughs under the Devon Ice Cap of Nunavut, Canada. These lakes are thought to be hypersaline as a result of interaction with the underlying salt-bearing bedrock, and are much more isolated than the few identified saline subglacial lakes in Antarctica.

== Ecology ==
Unlike surface lakes, subglacial lakes are isolated from Earth's atmosphere and receive no sunlight. Their waters are thought to be ultra-oligotrophic, meaning they contain very low concentrations of the nutrients necessary for life. Despite the cold temperatures, low nutrients, high pressure, and total darkness in subglacial lakes, these ecosystems have been found to harbor thousands of different microbial species and some signs of higher life. Professor John Priscu, a prominent scientist studying polar lakes, has called Antarctica's subglacial ecosystems "our planet's largest wetland."

Microorganisms and weathering processes drive a diverse set of chemical reactions that can drive a unique food-web and thus cycle nutrients and energy through subglacial lake ecosystems. No photosynthesis can occur in the darkness of subglacial lakes, so their food webs are instead driven by chemosynthesis and the consumption of ancient organic carbon deposited before glaciation. Nutrients can enter subglacial lakes through the glacier ice-lake water interface, from hydrologic connections, and from the physical, chemical, and biological weathering of subglacial sediments.

=== Biogeochemical cycles ===
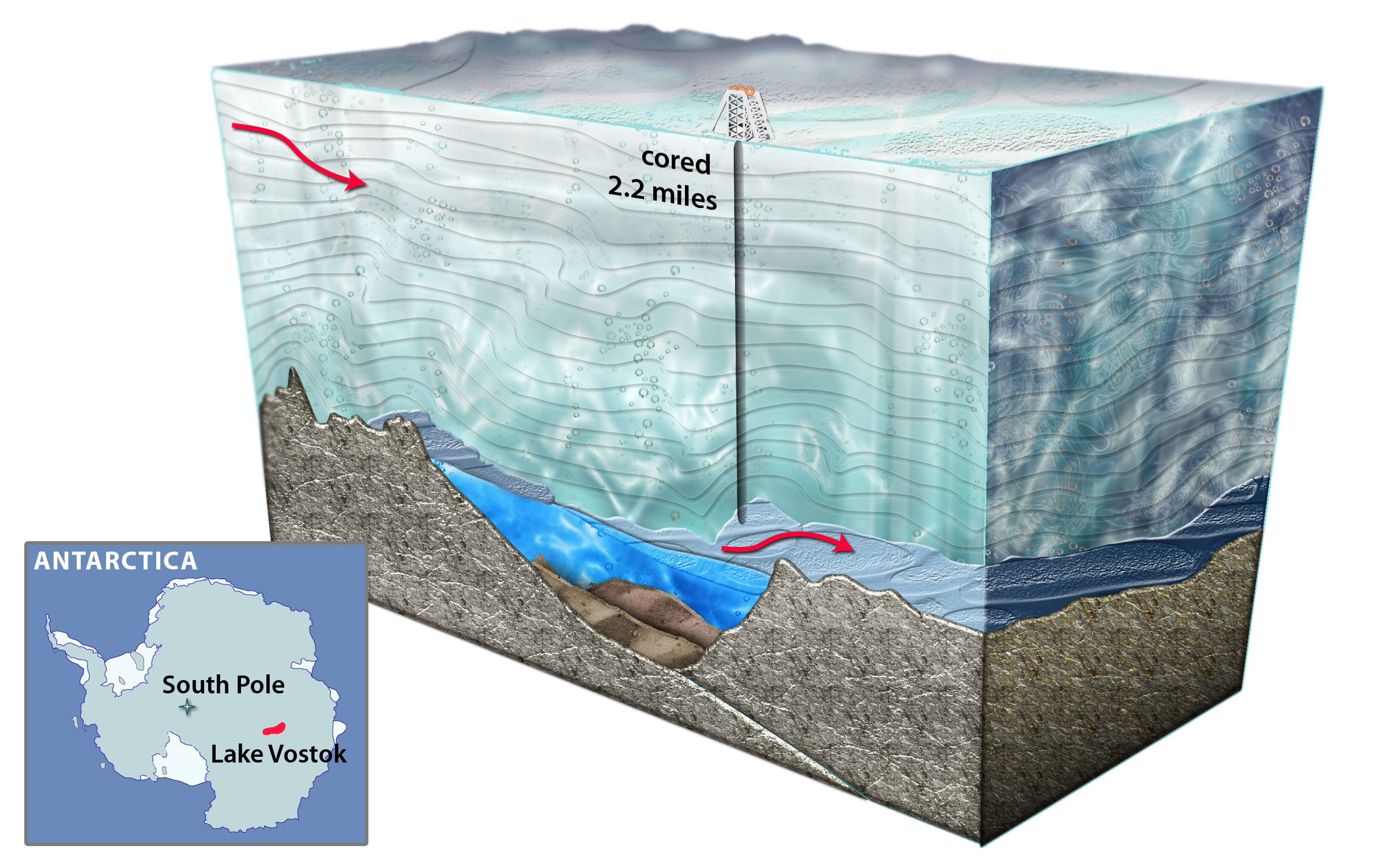
An illustration of ice core drilling above subglacial Lake Vostok. These drilling efforts collected re-frozen lake water that has been analyzed to understand the lake's chemistry. Image credit: Nicolle Rager-Fuller / US National Science Foundation

Since few subglacial lakes have been directly sampled, much of the existing knowledge about subglacial lake biogeochemistry is based on a small number of samples, mostly from Antarctica. Inferences about solute concentrations, chemical processes, and biological diversity of unsampled subglacial lakes have also been drawn from analyses of accretion ice (re-frozen lake water) at the base of the overlying glaciers. These inferences are based on the assumption that accretion ice will have similar chemical signatures as the lake water that formed it. Scientists have thus far discovered diverse chemical conditions in subglacial lakes, ranging from upper lake layers supersaturated in oxygen to bottom layers that are anoxic and sulfur-rich. Despite their typically oligotrophic conditions, subglacial lakes and sediments are thought to contain regionally and globally significant amounts of nutrients, particularly carbon.

==== At the lake-ice interface ====
Air clathrates trapped in glacial ice are the main source of oxygen entering otherwise enclosed subglacial lake systems. As the bottom layer of ice over the lake melts, clathrates are freed from the ice's crystalline structure and gases such as oxygen are made available to microbes for processes like aerobic respiration. In some subglacial lakes, freeze-melt cycles at the lake-ice interface may enrich the upper lake water with oxygen concentrations that are 50 times higher than in typical surface waters.

Melting of the layer of glacial ice above the subglacial lake also supplies underlying waters with iron, nitrogen, and phosphorus-containing minerals, in addition to some dissolved organic carbon and bacterial cells.

==== In the water column ====
Because air clathrates from melting glacial ice are the primary source of oxygen to subglacial lake waters, the concentration of oxygen generally decreases with depth in the water column if turnover is slow. Oxic or slightly suboxic waters often reside near the glacier-lake interface, while anoxia dominates in the lake interior and sediments due to respiration by microbes. In some subglacial lakes, microbial respiration may consume all of the oxygen in the lake, creating an entirely anoxic environment until new oxygen-rich water flows in from connected subglacial environments. The addition of oxygen from ice melt and the consumption of oxygen by microbes may create redox gradients in the subglacial lake water column, with aerobic microbial mediated processes like nitrification occurring in the upper waters and anaerobic processes occurring in the anoxic bottom waters.

Concentrations of solutes in subglacial lakes, including major ions and nutrients like sodium, sulfate, and carbonates, are low compared to typical surface lakes. These solutes enter the water column from glacial ice melting and from sediment weathering. Despite their low solute concentrations, the large volume of subglacial waters make them important contributors of solutes, particularly iron, to their surrounding oceans. Subglacial outflow from the Antarctic Ice Sheet, including outflow from subglacial lakes, is estimated to add a similar amount of solutes to the Southern Ocean as some of the world's largest rivers.

The subglacial water column is influenced by the exchange of water between lakes and streams under ice sheets through the subglacial drainage system; this behavior likely plays an important role in biogeochemical processes, leading to changes in microbial habitat, particularly regarding oxygen and nutrient concentrations. Hydrologic connectivity of subglacial lakes also alters water residence times, or amount of time that water stays within the subglacial lake reservoir. Longer residence times, such as those found beneath the interior Antarctic Ice Sheet, would lead to greater contact time between the water and solute sources, allowing for greater accumulation of solutes than in lakes with shorter residence times. Estimated residence times of currently studied subglacial lakes range from about 13,000 years in Lake Vostok to just decades in Lake Whillans.

The morphology of subglacial lakes has the potential to change their hydrology and circulation patterns. Areas with the thickest overlying ice experience greater rates of melting. The opposite occurs in areas where the ice sheet is thinnest, which allows re-freezing of lake water to occur. These spatial variations in melting and freezing rates lead to internal convection of water and circulation of solutes, heat, and microbial communities throughout the subglacial lake, which will vary among subglacial lakes of different regions.

==== In sediments ====
Subglacial sediments are primarily composed of glacial till that formed during physical weathering of subglacial bedrock. Anoxic conditions prevail in these sediments due to oxygen consumption by microbes, particularly during sulfide oxidation. Sulfide minerals are generated by weathering of bedrock by the overlying glacier, after which these sulfides are oxidized to sulfate by aerobic or anaerobic bacteria, which can use iron for respiration when oxygen is unavailable.

The products of sulfide oxidation can enhance the chemical weathering of carbonate and silicate minerals in subglacial sediments, particularly in lakes with long residence times. Weathering of carbonate and silicate minerals from lake sediments also releases other ions including potassium (K^{+}), magnesium (Mg^{2+}), sodium (Na^{+}), and calcium (Ca^{2+}) to lake waters.

Other biogeochemical processes in anoxic subglacial sediments include denitrification, iron reduction, sulfate reduction, and methanogenesis (see Reservoirs of organic carbon below).

=== Reservoirs of organic carbon ===
Subglacial sedimentary basins under the Antarctic Ice Sheet have accumulated an estimated 21,000 petagrams (trillion kilograms) of organic carbon, most of which comes from ancient marine sediments. This is more than 10 times the amount of organic carbon contained in Arctic permafrost and may rival the amount of reactive carbon in modern ocean sediments, potentially making subglacial sediments an important but understudied component of the global carbon cycle. In the event of ice sheet collapse, subglacial organic carbon could be more readily respired and thus released to the atmosphere and create a positive feedback on climate change.

The microbial inhabitants of subglacial lakes likely play an important role in determining the form and fate of sediment organic carbon. In the anoxic sediments of subglacial lake ecosystems, organic carbon can be used by archaea for methanogenesis, potentially creating large pools of methane clathrate in the sediments that could be released during ice sheet collapse or when lake waters drain to ice sheet margins. Methane has been detected in subglacial Lake Whillans, and experiments have shown that methanogenic archaea can be active in sediments beneath both Antarctic and Arctic glaciers.

Most of the methane that escapes storage in subglacial lake sediments appears to be consumed by methanotrophic bacteria in oxygenated upper waters. In subglacial Lake Whillans, scientists found that bacterial oxidation consumed 99% of the available methane. There is also evidence for active methane production and consumption beneath the Greenland Ice Sheet.

Antarctic subglacial waters are also thought to contain substantial amounts of organic carbon in the form of dissolved organic carbon and bacterial biomass. At an estimated 0.0103 petagrams, the amount of organic carbon in subglacial lake waters is far smaller than that contained in Antarctic subglacial sediments, but is only one order of magnitude smaller than the amount of organic carbon in all surface freshwaters (0.510 petagrams). This relatively smaller, but potentially more reactive, reservoir of subglacial organic carbon may represent another gap in scientists' understanding of the global carbon cycle.

=== Biology ===
Subglacial lakes were originally assumed to be sterile, but over the last thirty years, active microbial life and signs of higher life have been discovered in subglacial lake waters, sediments, and accreted ice. Subglacial waters are now known to contain thousands of microbial species, including bacteria, archaea, and potentially some eukaryotes. These extremophilic organisms are adapted to below-freezing temperatures, high pressure, low nutrients, and unusual chemical conditions. Researching microbial diversity and adaptations in subglacial lakes is of particular interest to scientists studying astrobiology, as well as the history and limits of life on Earth.

==== Food web structure and sources of energy ====
In most surface ecosystems, photosynthetic plants and microbes are the main primary producers that form the base of the lake food web. Photosynthesis is impossible in the permanent darkness of subglacial lakes, so these food webs are instead driven by chemosynthesis. In subglacial ecosystems, chemosynthesis is mainly carried out by chemolithoautotrophic microbes.

Like plants, chemolithoautotrophs fix carbon dioxide (CO_{2}) into new organic carbon, making them the primary producers at the base of subglacial lake food webs. Rather than using sunlight as an energy source, chemolithoautotrophs get energy from chemical reactions in which inorganic elements from the lithosphere are oxidized or reduced . Common elements used by chemolithoautotrophs in subglacial ecosystems include sulfide, iron, and carbonates weathered from sediments.

In addition to mobilizing elements from sediments, chemolithoautotrophs create enough new organic matter to support heterotrophic bacteria in subglacial ecosystems. Heterotrophic bacteria consume the organic material produced by chemolithoautotrophs, as well as consuming organic matter from sediments or from melting glacial ice. Despite the resources available to subglacial lake heterotrophs, these bacteria appear to be exceptionally slow-growing, potentially indicating that they dedicate most of their energy to survival rather than growth. Slow heterotrophic growth rates could also be explained by the cold temperatures in subglacial lakes, which slow down microbial metabolism and reaction rates.

The variable redox conditions and diverse elements available from sediments provide opportunities for many other metabolic strategies in subglacial lakes. Other metabolisms used by subglacial lake microbes include methanogenesis, methanotrophy, and chemolithoheterotrophy, in which bacteria consume organic matter while oxidizing inorganic elements.

Some limited evidence for microbial eukaryotes and multicellular animals in subglacial lakes could expand current ideas of subglacial food webs. If present, these organisms could survive by consuming bacteria and other microbes.

==== Nutrient limitation ====
Subglacial lake waters are considered to be ultra-oligotrophic and contain low concentrations of nutrients, particularly nitrogen and phosphorus. In surface lake ecosystems, phosphorus has traditionally been thought of as the limiting nutrient that constrains growth in the ecosystem, although co-limitation by both nitrogen and phosphorus supply seems most common. However, evidence from subglacial Lake Whillans suggests that nitrogen is the limiting nutrient in some subglacial waters, based on measurements showing that the ratio of nitrogen to phosphorus is very low compared to the Redfield ratio. An experiment showed that bacteria from Lake Whillans grew slightly faster when supplied with phosphorus as well as nitrogen, potentially contradicting the idea that growth in these ecosystems is limited by nitrogen alone.

==== Biological diversity in explored subglacial lakes ====
Biological exploration of subglacial lakes has focused on Antarctica, but the financial and logistical challenges of drilling through the Antarctic Ice Sheet for sample collection have limited successful direct samplings of Antarctic subglacial lake water to Lake Whillans and Lake Mercer. Volcanic subglacial lakes under Iceland's Vatnajökull ice cap have also been sampled.

===== Antarctica =====
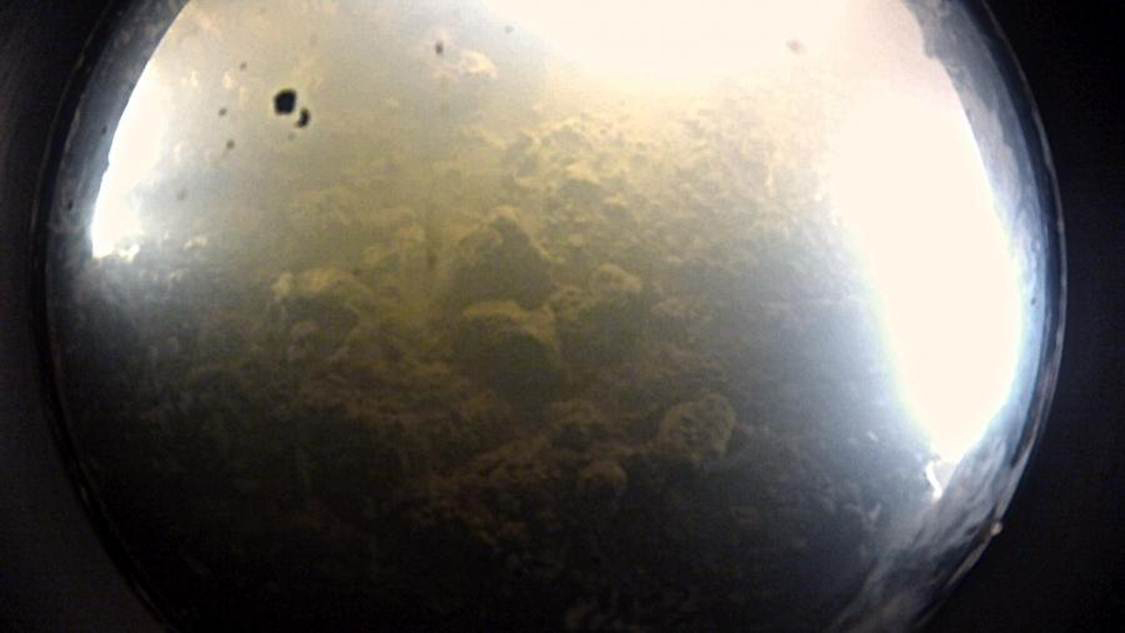
The first view of the sediment at the bottom of subglacial Lake Whillans, captured by the WISSARD expedition. Image credit: NASA/JPL, California Institute of Technology

In subglacial Lake Whillans, the WISSARD expedition collected sediment cores and water samples, which contained 130,000 microbial cells per milliliter and 3,914 different bacterial species. The team identified active bacteria that were metabolizing ammonia, methane, and sulfur from the 120,000-year-old sediments. The most abundant bacteria identified were related to Thiobacillus, Sideroxyans, and pscyhrophilic Polaromonas species.

In January 2019, the SALSA team collected sediment and water samples from subglacial Lake Mercer and found diatom shells and well-preserved carcasses from crustaceans and a tardigrade. Although the animals were dead, the team also found bacterial concentrations of 10,000 cells per milliliter, suggesting the potential for animals to survive in the lake by consuming bacteria. The team will continue analyzing the samples to further investigate the chemistry and biology of the lake.

Lake Vostok is the best-studied Antarctic subglacial lake, but its waters have only been studied through analysis of accretion ice from the bottom of ice cores taken during Russian drilling efforts above the lake. Actively growing bacteria and thousands of unique DNA sequences from bacteria, archaea, and eukaryotes have been found in Lake Vostok's accretion ice. Some DNA appeared to come from multicellular eukaryotes, including species seemingly related to freshwater Daphnia, tardigrades, and mollusks. These species may have survived in the lake and slowly adapted to the changing conditions since Vostok was last exposed to the atmosphere millions of years ago. However, the samples were likely contaminated by drilling fluid while being collected, so some of the identified organisms probably did not live in the lake.

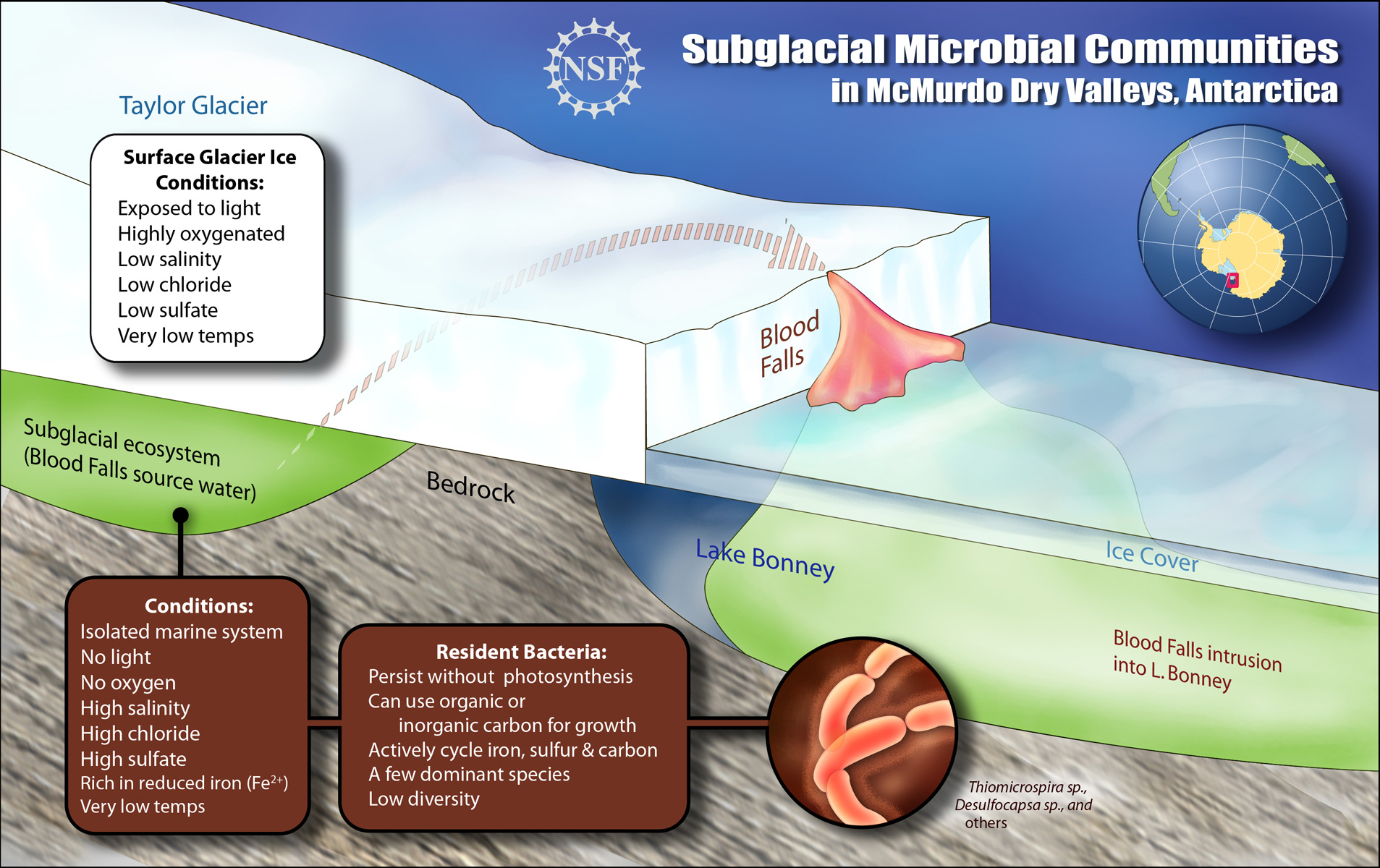
A schematic cross-section of the subglacial pool beneath Taylor Glacier and its outflow, Blood Falls. Image credit: Zina Deretsky / US National Science Foundation

Other subglacial sampling efforts in Antarctica include the subglacial pool of anoxic, hypersaline water under Taylor Glacier, which harbors a microbial community that was sealed off from the atmosphere 1.5 to 2 million years ago. Bacteria under Taylor Glacier appear to have a novel metabolic strategy that uses sulfate and ferric ions to decompose organic matter.

===== Greenland =====
No direct sampling of subglacial lakes has been attempted on the Greenland Ice Sheet. However, subglacial outflow waters have been sampled and found to contain methanogenic and methanotrophic microbes. Bacteria have also been discovered within the ice sheet itself, but they are unlikely to be active within the ice.

===== Iceland =====
Subglacial lakes under Iceland's Vatnajökull ice cap provide unique habitats for microbial life because they receive heat and chemical inputs from subglacial volcanic activity, influencing the chemistry of lower lake waters and sediments. Active psychrophilic, autotrophic bacteria have been discovered in the lake below the Grímsvötn volcanic caldera. A low-diversity microbial community has also been found in the east Skaftárketill and Kverkfjallalón subglacial lakes, where bacteria include Geobacter and Desulfuosporosinus species that can use sulfur and iron for anaerobic respiration. In the western Skaftá lake, the anoxic bottom waters appear to be dominated by acetate-producing bacteria rather than methanogens.

==== Refugia for ancient life ====
In some cases, subglacial lake waters have been isolated for millions of years, and these "fossil waters" may harbor evolutionarily distinct microbial communities. Some subglacial lakes in East Antarctica have existed for about 20 million years, but the interconnected subglacial drainage system between lakes under the Antarctic Ice Sheet implies that lake waters have probably not been isolated over the entire lifespan of the lake.

During the proposed Snowball Earth period of the late Proterozoic, extensive glaciation could have completely covered Earth's surface in ice for 10 million years. Life would have survived primarily in glacial and subglacial environments, making modern subglacial lakes an important study system for understanding this period in Earth's history. More recently, subglacial lakes in Iceland may have provided a refuge for subterranean amphipods during the Quaternary glacial period.

== Implications for extraterrestrial life ==
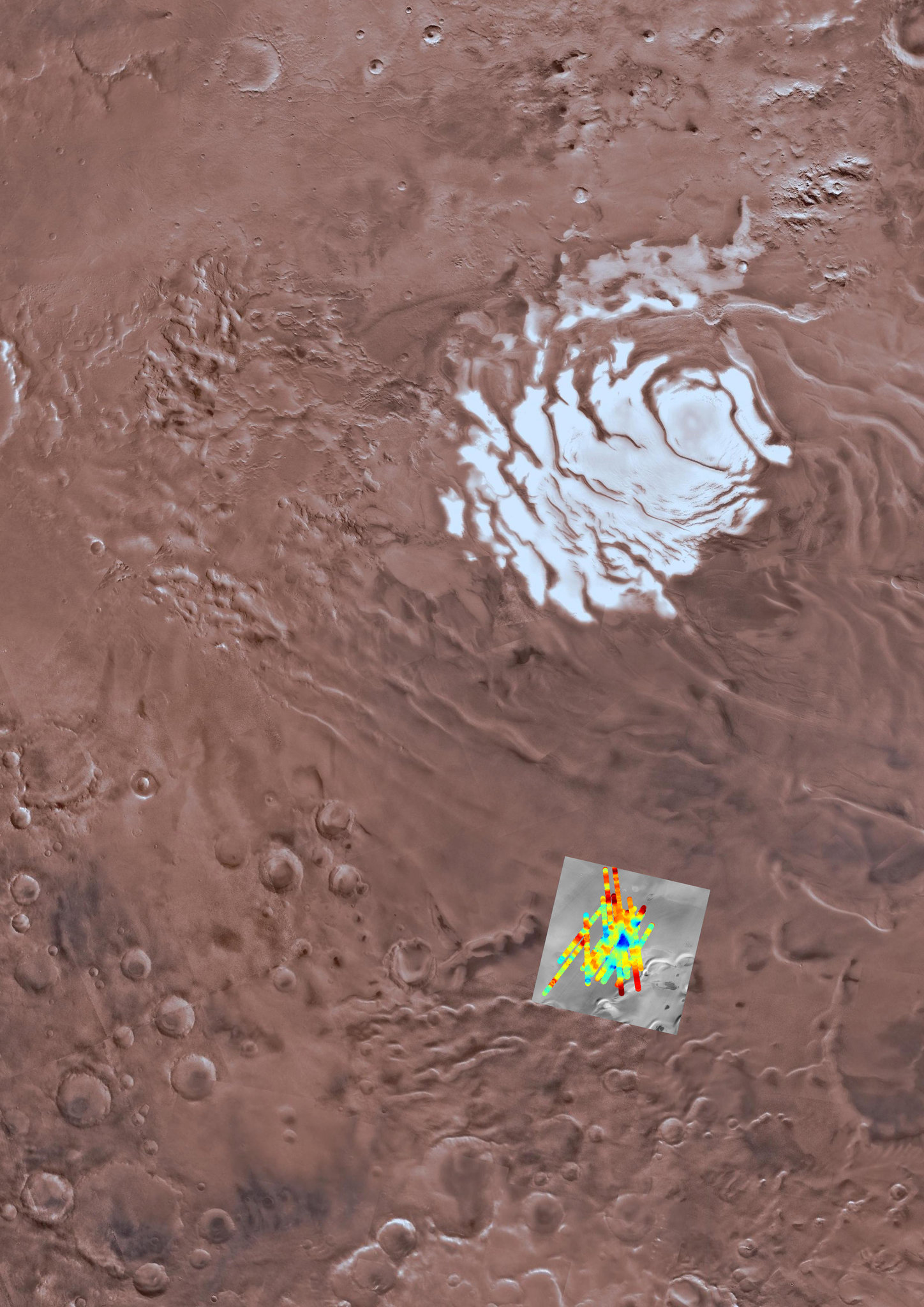
A view of the southern polar plain of Mars. The area where a subglacial lake has been detected is highlighted. Image credit: USGS Astrogeology Science Center, Arizona State University

Subglacial lakes are an analog environment for extraterrestrial ice-covered water bodies, making them an important study system in the field of astrobiology, which is the study of the potential for life to exist outside Earth. Discoveries of living extremophilic microbes in Earth's subglacial lakes could suggest that life may persist in similar environments on extraterrestrial bodies. Subglacial lakes also provide study systems for planning research efforts in remote, logistically challenging locations that are sensitive to biological contamination.

Jupiter's moon Europa and Saturn's moon Enceladus are promising targets in the search for extraterrestrial life. Europa contains an extensive ocean covered by an icy crust, and Enceladus is also thought to harbor a subglacial ocean. Satellite analysis of an icy water vapor plume escaping from fissures in Enceladus' surface reveals significant subsurface production of hydrogen, which may point towards the reduction of iron-bearing minerals and organic matter.

A subglacial lake on Mars was discovered in 2018 using RES on the Mars Express spacecraft. This body of water was found beneath Mars' South Polar Layered Deposits, and is suggested to have formed as a result of geothermal heating causing melting beneath the ice cap.

== See also ==
- European Remote Sensing Satellite
- RADARSAT
- Advanced Space Borne Thermal Emission and Reflection Radiometer (ASTER)
- ICESat
- NASA Earth Observing
- SCAR
- CryoSat
- List of Antarctic subglacial lakes
- Lake Vostok
- Lake Whillans
- Lake Ellsworth
- Lake Untersee
- Lake Hodgson
- Glacial lake
- Proglacial lake
- Supraglacial lake
- Underground lake
