= Lake Whillans =

Subglacial lake in Antarctica

- Location within Antarctica
- Coordinates: 84°15′S 153°30′W
- Type: Subglacial
- Basin countries: Antarctica
- Surface area: 60 km^{2} (20 mi^{2})
- Average depth: 2 m (7 ft)

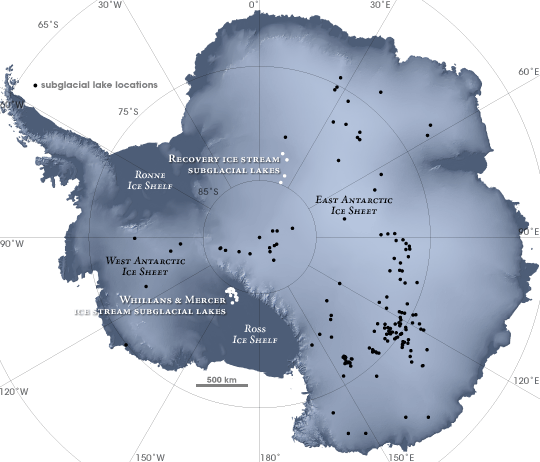
Antarctic Subglacial Lakes Map

Lake Whillans is a subglacial lake in Antarctica. The lake is located under the Whillans Ice Stream at the southeastern edge of the Ross Ice Shelf in the west of the continent. The lake surface is 800 m (2,600 ft) beneath the surface of the ice and the lake covers an estimated area of 60 km^{2} (20 sq mi). Lake depths measured thus far have been around 2 metres (7 feet). Its temperature is −0.49 °C, below 0 °C because of the high pressure.

Lake Whillans, like the Whillans Ice Stream, is named for Ohio State University glaciologist Dr. Ian Whillans.

== Discovery ==
The lake was first described in 2007 by Helen Fricker, a glaciologist at the Scripps Institution of Oceanography. Satellite laser altimeter data from NASA's ICESat had revealed the ice at that location rising and falling, leading her team to conclude the presence of the lake.

== Research ==
On 28 January 2013, the Whillans Ice Stream Subglacial Access Research Drilling (WISSARD) team announced that they had reached the lake surface having drilled 800 m (2,600 ft) through the ice above. Drilling was accomplished using a hot-water drill to create a borehole 30 cm (12 in) in diameter. Over the following days the team collected water samples and also sediment cores from the lake bottom. Initial analysis of water and sediment has revealed that they contain more than 3,900 kinds of microbial life. Bacteria are surviving in this environment without photosynthesis. The ecosystem is apparently based on the oxidation of ammonia and methane from sediments laid down at least 120,000 years ago.

According to WISSARD, the project “marks the first successful retrieval of clean whole samples from an Antarctic subglacial lake”. Similar efforts have been undertaken at Lake Vostok, where samples have yet to yield any discoveries, and at Lake Ellsworth, where drilling had to be abandoned.

These projects may yield insights into the search for life elsewhere in the Solar System. In particular, the moons Europa (Jupiter) and Enceladus (Saturn) have large amounts of liquid water beneath icy crusts.

In January 2015, researchers looking for evidence of a connection between Lake Whillans and the sea failed to find one. However, they did make a discovery of fish and crustaceans in seawater, on the ocean side of the grounding line (where the edge of the glacier meets the sea floor). Images taken with a remote camera showed fish 20 centimetres (8 in) long and amphipods.

== See also ==
- Whillans Ice Stream
- Lake Vostok
- Lake Ellsworth
