= Pressure melting point =

Temperature at which ice melts at a given pressure

In this log-lin pressure-temperature phase diagram of water, the pressure melting point for a given pressure lies along the black line rising from the solid/liquid/vapour triple point along the 0 °C vertical line.

The pressure melting point of ice is the temperature at which ice melts at a given pressure. The pressure melting point is nearly a constant 0 °C at pressures above the triple point at 611.7 Pa—where ice, water, and water vapour coexist in equilibrium—through atmospheric pressure (100 kPa) until about 10 MPa. With increasing pressure above 10 MPa, the pressure melting point decreases to a minimum of −21.9 °C at 209.9 MPa. Thereafter, the pressure melting point rises rapidly with pressure, passing back through 0 °C at 632.4 MPa.

== Pressure melting point in glaciers ==
Glaciers are subject to geothermal heat flux from below and atmospheric warming or cooling from above. As the pressure increases with depth in a glacier from the weight of the ice above, the pressure melting point of ice decreases within bounds, as shown in the diagram. The level where ice can start melting is where the pressure melting point equals the actual temperature. In static equilibrium conditions, this would be the highest level where water can exist in a glacier. It would also be the level of the base of an ice shelf, or the ice-water interface of a subglacial lake.
