= Concordia Subglacial Lake =

- Location within Antarctica
- Location: Antarctica, Antarctic Plateau
- Coordinates: 74°6′S 125°9′E
- Type: subglacial lake
- Etymology: Concordia Research Station
- Surface area: ~800 km^{2} (310 sq mi)
- Average depth: ~ 250 m (820 ft)
- Max. depth: ~ 300 m (980 ft)
- Water volume: 200 km^{3} (48 cu mi) + or - 40 km^{3} (9.6 cu mi)
- Surface elevation: sloped surface, −623 m (−2,044 ft) to −898 m (−2,946 ft)

Concordia Subglacial Lake is a subglacial lake located beneath an ice sheet 3,850 m (12,630 ft) to 4,125 m (13,533 ft) thick. It has a surface of about 800 km^{2} (310 sq mi) and is ~ 300 m (980 ft) deep. The sloped surface of the water has an elevation from 623 m (2,044 ft) to 898 m (2,946 ft) below mean sea level. The elevation of the icecover, above Concordia Subglacial Lake is: 3,227 m (10,587 ft) m.a.s.l. It was first located in December 1999; the name derives from the nearby French-Italian Concordia Research Station.
