= Lake Ellsworth (Antarctica) =

Lake in Antarctica

- Location within Antarctica
- Location: West Antarctica
- Coordinates: 79°S 91°W
- Lake type: subglacial
- Max. length: 14.7 km (9.1 mi)
- Max. width: 3 km (1.9 mi)
- Surface area: ~28.9 km^{2} (11.2 sq mi)
- Average depth: ~ 47.4 m (156 ft)
- Max. depth: 156 m (512 ft)
- Water volume: 1.37 km^{3} (0.33 cu mi) + or - 0.2 km^{3} (0.048 cu mi)
- Surface elevation: gradient surface, ~1,030–1,380 m (3,380–4,530 ft) below mean sea level

Lake Ellsworth is a natural freshwater liquid subglacial lake located in West Antarctica under approximately 2.93–3.28 km (1.82–2.04 mi) of ice. It is approximately 14.7 km (9.1 mi) long and is estimated to be 156 m (512 ft) in max. depth. The lake is named after the American explorer Lincoln Ellsworth. The surface of the lake itself is located, approximately 3,379–4,528 feet (1,030–1,380 m) below mean sea level. Elevation of icecap covering, the lake: 1,900–1,925 m (6,234–6,316 ft) m.a.s.l.

== Exploration ==
Lake Ellsworth was discovered in 1996 by British scientist Professor Martin Siegert of the University of Bristol; it is one of 387 known subglacial Antarctic lakes and it is a target site for exploration due to the speculation that new forms of microbial life could have evolved in the unique habitats of Antarctica's sub-glacial lakes after half a million years of isolation. Life in subglacial lakes would have to adapt to total darkness, low nutrient levels, high water pressure, and isolation from the atmosphere. Subglacial lakes thus represent unique biological habitats. The lake remains liquid deep below the Antarctic surface because the pressure exerted by thousands of meters of ice drives down the freezing point of water.

On 2 March 2009 the UK's Natural Environment Research Council authorized a team of British scientists to drill through the overlaying ice to the surface of the lake in December 2012. The drilling was to be overseen by The Scientific Committee on Antarctic Research from the International Council for Science (ICSU). The British team spent sixteen years developing the technology to explore the lake using methods that would not lead to chemical or biological contamination. Scientists hoped to use a hot water jet to drill a borehole 36 centimeters (14 inches) wide down through the ice to the lake, to enable a probe to retrieve sediment and water to be analyzed for microorganisms. This would be a test to determine if water correlates with life under extreme pressure, cold and nutrient deficiencies. If the group could not find life, it would inform a limit where there is water and no life.

Radar surveys indicated that the lake floor sediments are suitable for coring, which could contain a record of ice sheet history. Scientists think that the sediment and water samples could also hold key information about climate change. In January 2012 the drilling was scheduled to start between November 2012 and January 2013. Depending on the weather, the team expected to drill continuously for 100 hours to reach the lake.

On 12 December 2012 the British research team began to bore the ice-sheet to obtain water samples. Using a high-pressure hose and sterilised water at near-boiling point, they hoped to bore a passage through over two miles of ice. The team thought the drilling would take five days, before attempts to obtain samples could be made. Professor Siegert considered that the search, if successful, could create the possibility of exploring for life in similar extreme environments, such as Jupiter's moon Europa. On 25 December 2012 it was announced that the project had been called off, after attempts to link two 300m-deep boreholes failed.

From the principal investigator, Professor Martin Siegert:

Drilling stopped after the team was unable to form the water-filled cavity 300 metres beneath the ice. This cavity was to link the main borehole with a secondary borehole used to recirculate drilling water back to the surface.
On Christmas Eve we took the decision to cease our efforts to directly measure and sample Subglacial Lake Ellsworth. Although circumstances have not worked out as we would have wished, I am confident that through the huge efforts of the field team, and our colleagues in the UK, we have done as much as we possibly could have done, and I sincerely thank them all. I am also hugely grateful to the UK Natural Environment Research Council for making it possible for us to attempt the direct exploration of subglacial Antarctica. Sixteen years ago, we hypothesised that deep-water subglacial lakes are viable habitats for life, and contain important records of ice and climate history. For now, these hypotheses remain untested. Once back in the UK I will gather our consortium to seek ways in which our research efforts may continue. I remain confident that we will unlock the secrets of Lake Ellsworth in coming seasons.

The first borehole was drilled to a depth of 300m and then left at that depth for 12 hours to create the cavity. The second, main borehole (located 2m away from the first) was then drilled to 300m depth and should have immediately connected with this cavity. This main borehole would then continue through the cavity and down to the lake while the first borehole would be used to recirculate water back to the surface using a submersible pump. In this way, the ice cavity can be used to balance the level of water in the boreholes and hence balance the pressure from the lake upon breakthrough.
For reasons that are yet to be determined the team could not establish a link between the two boreholes at 300m depth, despite trying for over 20 hours. During this process, hot water seeped into the porous surface layers of ice and was lost. The team attempted to replenish this water loss by digging and melting more snow, but their efforts could not compensate. The additional time taken to attempt to establish the cavity link significantly depleted the fuel stocks to such a level as to render the remaining operation unviable.

== See also ==
- Lakes of Antarctica
- Lake Vostok
- Jemma Wadham
