= Lake Vostok =

Antarctica's largest known subglacial lake

- Russian: озеро Восток
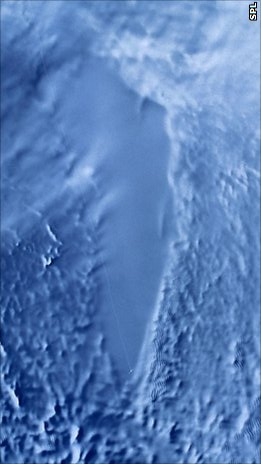
- Radar satellite image of Lake Vostok

- Location within Antarctica
- Coordinates: 77°30′S 106°00′E
- Lake type: Ancient lake, Subglacial rift lake
- Basin countries: Antarctica
- Max. length: 250 km (160 mi)
- Max. width: 50 km (30 mi)
- Surface area: 12,500 km^{2} (4,830 mi^{2})
- Average depth: 432 m (1,417 ft)
- Max. depth: 510 m (1,700 ft) to 900 m (3,000 ft)
- Water volume: 5,400 km^{3} (1,300 mi^{3}) ± 1,600 km^{3} (400 mi^{3})
- Residence time: 13,300 yrs
- Surface elevation: c. −500 m (−1,600 ft)
- Islands: 1
- Settlements: Vostok Station

Lake Vostok (Russian: озеро Восток, romanized: ozero Vostok) is the largest of Antarctica's 675 known subglacial lakes and the 16th largest lake in the world by area. Lake Vostok is located at the southern Pole of Cold, beneath Russia's Vostok Station, under the surface of the central East Antarctic Ice Sheet, which is at 3,488 m (11,444 ft) above mean sea level. The surface of this fresh water lake is approximately 4,000 m (13,100 ft) under the surface of the ice, which places it at approximately 500 m (1,600 ft) below sea level.

The lake is named after the Vostok Station, which derives its name from Vostok (Восток), the name of a sloop-of-war, which means "East" in Russian (the lake is also located in East Antarctica). The existence of a subglacial lake was first suggested by Russian geographer Andrey Kapitsa based on seismic soundings made during the Soviet Antarctic Expeditions in 1959 and 1964 to measure the thickness of the ice sheet. Continued research by Russian and British scientists led to the final confirmation of the existence of the lake in 1993 by J. P. Ridley using ERS-1 laser altimetry.

The overlying ice provides a continuous paleoclimatic record of 400,000 years, although the lake water itself may have been isolated for 15 to 25 million years. Because Lake Vostok may contain an environment sealed off below the ice for millions of years, the conditions could resemble those of ice-covered oceans hypothesized to exist on Jupiter's moon Europa, and Saturn's moon Enceladus.

On 5 February 2012, a team of Russian scientists completed the longest ever ice core of 3,768 m (12,400 ft) and pierced the ice shield to the surface of the lake. The first core of freshly frozen lake ice was obtained on 10 January 2013 at a depth of 3,406 m (11,175 ft). However, as soon as the ice was pierced, water from the underlying lake gushed up the borehole, mixing it with the Freon and kerosene used to keep the borehole from freezing. It is hypothesized that unusual forms of life could be found in the lake's liquid layer, a fossil water reserve. The drilling project has been opposed by some environmental groups and scientists who have argued that hot-water drilling would have a more limited environmental impact.

== Discovery ==
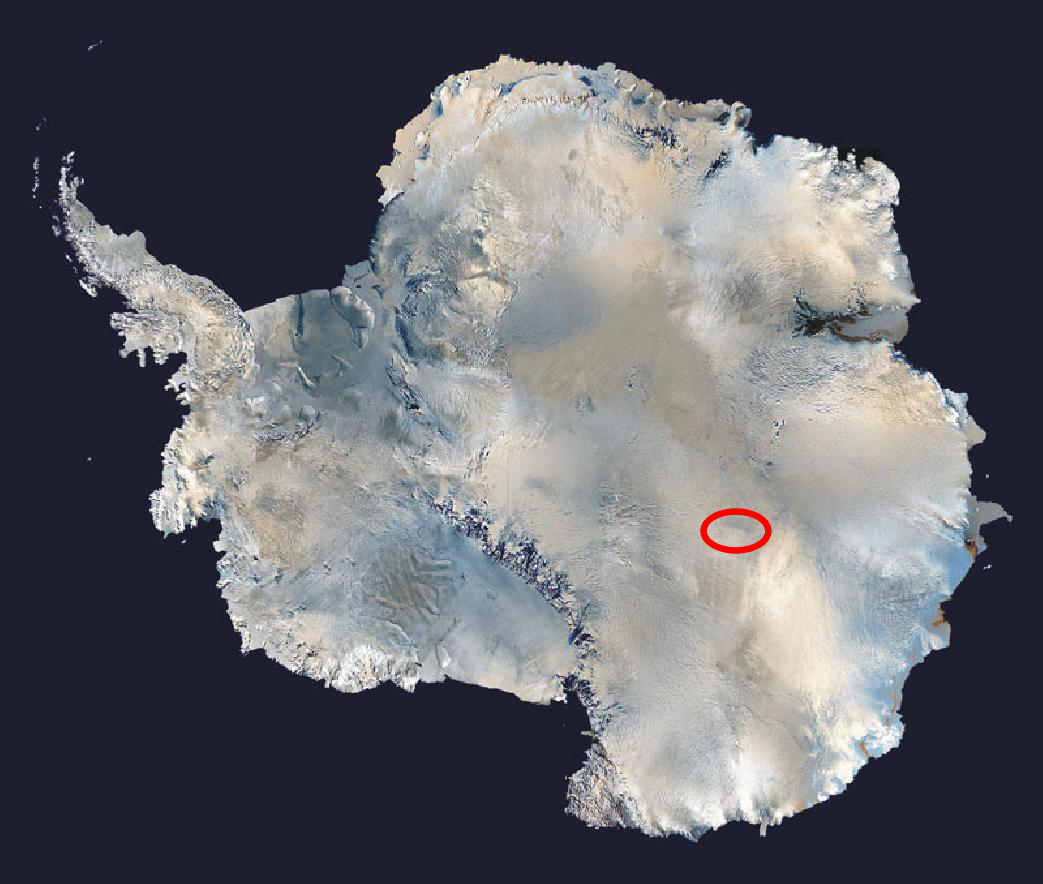
Location of Lake Vostok in East Antarctica

Russian scientist Peter Kropotkin first proposed the idea of fresh water under Antarctic ice sheets at the end of the 19th century. He theorized that the tremendous pressure exerted by the cumulative mass of thousands of vertical meters of ice could decrease the melting point at the lowest portions of the ice sheet to the point where the ice would become liquid water. Kropotkin's theory was further developed by Russian glaciologist Igor Zotikov, who wrote his PhD thesis on this subject in 1967.

Russian geographer Andrey Kapitsa used seismic soundings in the region of Vostok Station made during the Soviet Antarctic Expedition in 1959 and 1964 to measure the thickness of the ice sheet. In the mid 1990s, Kapitsa was invited to join a symposium on Antarctica by the Scott Polar Research Institute in Cambridge and during this time he realized that the data collected from his previous expeditions demonstrated the presence of water in the ice. The continued research by Russian and British scientists led to the final confirmation of the existence of the lake in 1993 by J. P. Ridley using ERS-1 laser altimetry.

When British scientists in Antarctica performed airborne ice-penetrating radar surveys in the early 1970s, they detected unusual radar readings at the site which suggested the presence of a liquid freshwater lake below the ice. In 1991, J. P. Ridley, a remote sensing specialist with the Mullard Space Science Laboratory at University College London, directed the ERS-1 satellite to turn its high-frequency array toward the center of the Antarctic ice cap. The data from ERS-1 confirmed the findings from the 1973 British surveys, but these new data were not published in the Journal of Glaciology until 1993. Space-based radar revealed that this subglacial body of fresh water is one of the largest lakes in the world, and one of some 140 subglacial lakes in Antarctica. Russian and British scientists delineated the lake in by integrating a variety of data, including airborne ice-penetrating radar imaging observations and space-based radar altimetry, and the discovery of the lake was published in the science journal Nature on 20 June 1996. It has been confirmed that the lake contains large amounts of liquid water under the more than 3-kilometer-thick (1.9 mi) ice cap. The lake has at least 22 cavities of liquid water, averaging 10 kilometers (6 mi) each.

The station after which the lake is named commemorates the Vostok (Восток), the 900-ton sloop-of-war ship sailed by one of the discoverers of Antarctica, Russian explorer Admiral Fabian von Bellingshausen. Because the word Vostok means "East" in Russian, the names of the station and lake also reflect the fact that they are located in East Antarctica.

In 2005 an island was found in the central part of the lake. Then, in January 2006, the discovery of two nearby smaller lakes under the ice cap was published; they are named 90 Degrees East and Sovetskaya. It is suspected that these Antarctic subglacial lakes may be connected by a network of subglacial rivers. Centre for Polar Observation & Modelling glaciologists propose that many of the subglacial lakes of Antarctica are at least temporarily interconnected. Because of varying water pressure in individual lakes, large subsurface rivers may suddenly form and then force large amounts of water through the solid ice.

== Geological history ==
Africa separated from Antarctica around 160 million years ago, followed by the Indian subcontinent, in the early Cretaceous (about 125 million years ago). About 66 million years ago, Antarctica (then connected to Australia) still had a tropical to subtropical climate, complete with marsupial fauna and an extensive temperate rainforest.

The Lake Vostok basin is a small (50-kilometer-wide (31 mi)) tectonic feature within the overall setting of a several-hundred-kilometer-wide continental collision zone between the Gamburtsev Mountain Range, a subglacial mountain range and the Dome C region. The lake water is cradled on a bed of sediments 70 meters (230 ft) thick, offering the possibility that they contain a unique record of the climate and life in Antarctica before the ice cap formed.

== Traits ==
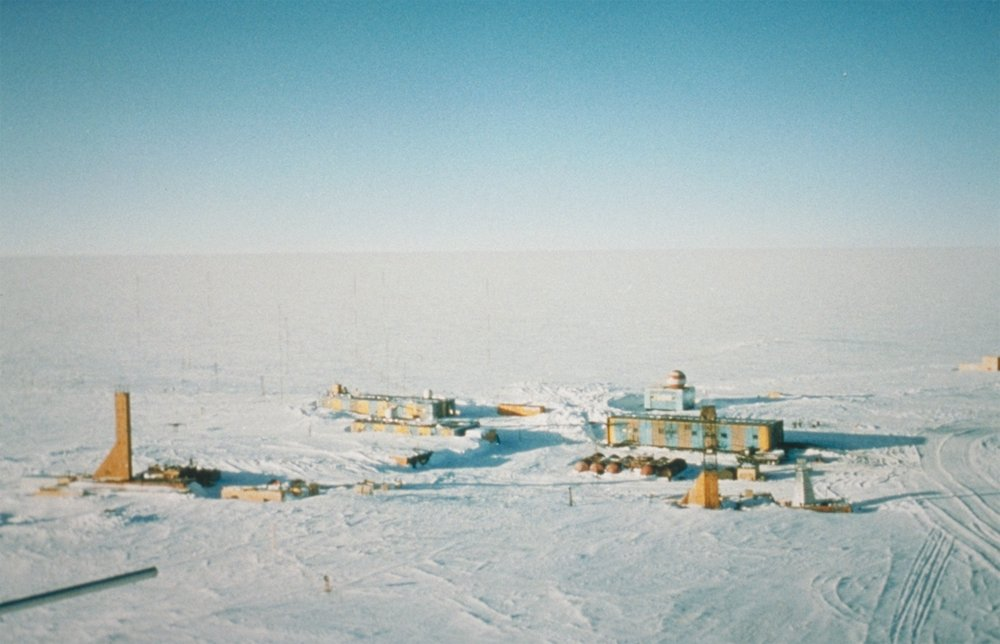
Vostok Station

The lake water is estimated to have been sealed off under the thick ice sheet about 15 million years ago. Initially, it was thought that the same water had made up the lake since the time of its formation, giving a residence time in the order of one million years. Later research by Robin Bell and Michael Studinger from the Lamont–Doherty Earth Observatory of Columbia University suggested that the water of the lake is continually freezing and being carried away by the motion of the Antarctic ice sheet, while being replaced by water melting from other parts of the ice sheet in these high pressure conditions. This resulted in an estimate that the entire volume of the lake is replaced every 13,300 years – its effective mean residence time.

The coldest naturally occurring temperature ever observed on Earth, −89 °C (−128 °F), was recorded at Vostok Station on 21 July 1983. The average water temperature is calculated to be around −3 °C (27 °F); it remains liquid below the normal freezing point because of high pressure from the weight of the ice above it. Geothermal heat from the Earth's interior may warm the bottom of the lake.

Lake Vostok is an oligotrophic extreme environment, one that is expected to be supersaturated with nitrogen and oxygen, measuring 2.5 litres (0.088 cu ft) of nitrogen and oxygen per 1 kg (2.2 lb) of water, that is 50 times higher than those typically found in ordinary freshwater lakes on Earth's surface. The sheer weight and pressure around 345 bars (5,000 psi) of the continental ice cap on top of Lake Vostok is estimated to contribute to the high gas concentration.

Besides dissolving in the water, oxygen and other gases are trapped in a type of structure called a clathrate. In clathrate structures, gases are enclosed in an icy cage and look like packed snow. These structures form at the high-pressure depths of Lake Vostok and would become unstable if brought to the surface.

In April 2005, German, Russian, and Japanese researchers found that the lake has tides. Depending on the position of the Sun and the Moon, the surface of the lake rises about 12 mm (0.47 in). The lake is under complete darkness, under 355 bar (5,150 psi) of pressure, and expected to be rich in oxygen, so there is speculation that any organisms inhabiting the lake could have evolved in a manner unique to this environment. There is a 1 microtesla magnetic anomaly on the east coast of the lake, spanning 105 by 75 km (65 by 47 mi). Researchers hypothesize that the anomaly may be caused by a thinning of the Earth's crust in that location.

Living Hydrogenophilus thermoluteolus micro-organisms have been found in Lake Vostok's deep ice core drillings; they are an extant surface-dwelling species. This suggests the presence of a deep biosphere utilizing a geothermal system of the bedrock encircling the subglacial lake. There is optimism that microbial life in the lake may be possible despite high pressure, constant cold, low nutrient input, potentially high oxygen concentration and an absence of sunlight. Jupiter's moon Europa and Saturn's moon Enceladus likely also harbor lakes or oceans below a thick crust of ice. Any confirmation of life in Lake Vostok could strengthen the prospect for the presence of life on icy moons.

Lake Vostok measures 250 km (160 mi) long by 50 km (30 mi) wide at its widest point, it covers an area of 12,500 km^{2} (4,830 sq mi) making it the 16th largest lake by surface area. With an average depth of 432 m (1,417 ft), it has an estimated volume of 5,400 km^{3} (1,300 mi^{3}), making it the 6th largest lake by volume.

== Research ==
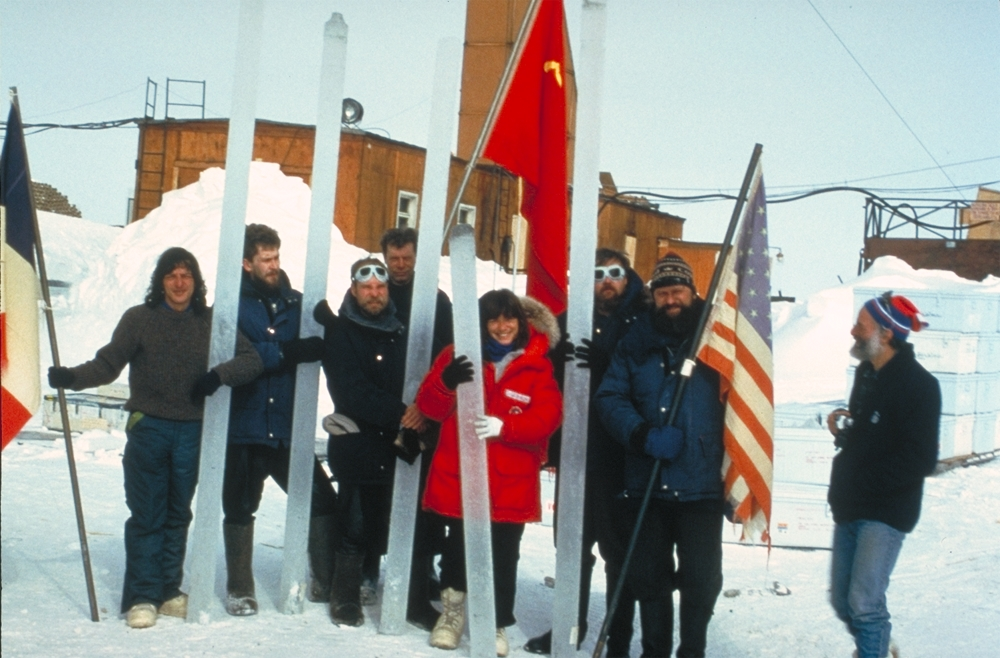
Ice cores drilled at Vostok Station, which is seen in the background

Researchers working at Vostok Station produced one of the world's longest ice cores in 1998. A joint Russian, French, and United States team drilled and analyzed the core, which is 3,623 m (11,886 ft) long. Ice samples from cores drilled close to the top of the lake have been assessed to be as old as 420,000 years. The assumption is that the lake has been sealed from the surface since the ice sheet was formed 15 million years ago. Drilling of the core was deliberately halted roughly 100 m (300 ft) above the suspected boundary between the ice sheet and the liquid waters of the lake. This was to prevent contamination of the lake with the 60-ton column of Freon and kerosene used to prevent the borehole from collapsing and freezing over.

From this core, specifically from ice that is thought to have formed from lake water freezing onto the base of the ice sheet, extremophile microbes were found, suggesting that the lake water supports life. Scientists suggested that the lake could possess a unique habitat for ancient bacteria with an isolated microbial gene pool containing characteristics developed perhaps 500,000 years ago.

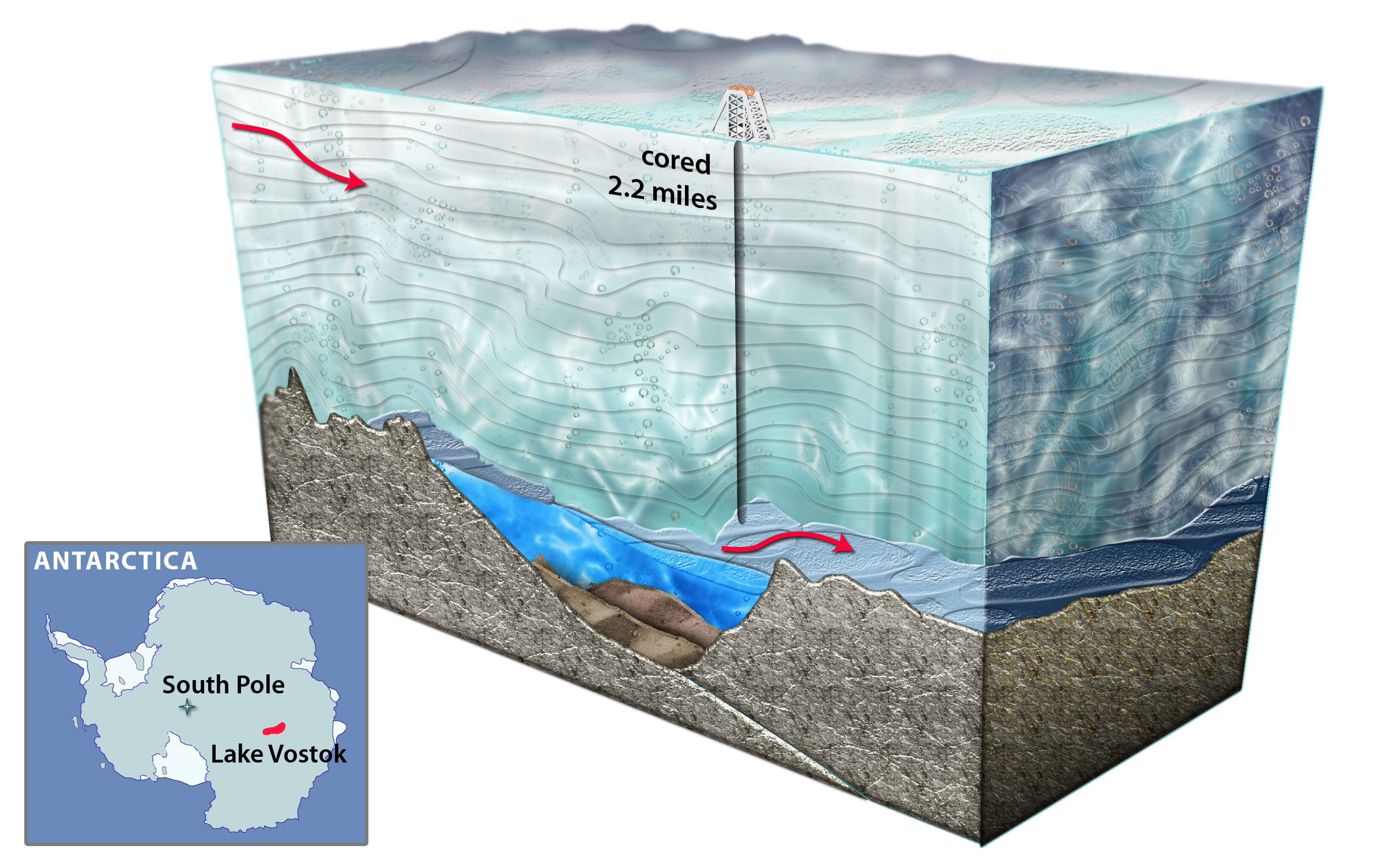
An artist's cross-section of Lake Vostok's drilling

In January 2011, the head of the Russian Antarctic Expedition, Valery Lukin, announced that his team had only 50 m (200 ft) of ice left to drill in order to reach the water. The researchers then switched to a new thermal drill head with a "clean" silicone oil fluid to drill the rest of the way. Instead of drilling all the way into the water, they said they would stop just above it when a sensor on the thermal drill detected free water. At that point, the drill was to be stopped and extracted from the bore hole. Removal of the drill would lower the pressure beneath it, drawing water into the hole to be left to freeze, creating a plug of ice in the bottom of the hole. Drilling stopped on 5 February 2011 at a depth of 3,720 m (12,200 ft) so that the research team could make it off the ice before the beginning of the Antarctic winter season. The drilling team left by aircraft on 6 February 2011.

By plan, the following summer, the team was to drill down again to take a sample of that ice and analyze it. The Russians resumed drilling into the lake in January 2012 and reached the upper surface of the water on 6 February 2012.

=== Biology results ===
==== United Kingdom and United States ====
Scientists first reported evidence of microbes in the accretion ice in 1999. Since then, a different team led by Scott O. Rogers has been identifying a variety of bacteria and fungi from accretion ice (not from the subglacial water layer) collected during U.S. drilling projects in the 1990s. According to him, this indicates that the lake below the ice is not sterile but contains a unique ecosystem. Then Scott Rogers published in July 2013 that his team performed nucleic acid (DNA and RNA) sequencing and the results allowed deduction of the metabolic pathways represented in the accretion ice and, by extension, in the lake. The team found 3,507 unique gene sequences, and approximately 94% of the sequences were from bacteria and 6% were from Eukarya. Taxonomic classifications (to genus and/or species) or identification were possible for 1,623 of the sequences. In general, the taxa were similar to organisms previously described from lakes, brackish water, marine environments, soil, glaciers, ice, lake sediments, deep-sea sediments, deep-sea thermal vents, animals and plants. Sequences from aerobic, anaerobic, psychrophilic, thermophilic, halophilic, alkaliphilic, acidophilic, desiccation-resistant, autotrophic, and heterotrophic organisms were present, including a number from multicellular eukaryotes. In the 2013 study, the presence of bacteria that inhabit fish intestines was also reported.

Microbiologist David Pearce of the University of Northumbria in Newcastle, UK, stated that the DNA could simply be contamination from the drilling process, and not representative of Lake Vostok itself. The old ice cores were drilled in the 1990s to look for evidence of past climates buried in the ice, rather than for life, so the drilling equipment was not sterilized. Also Sergey Bulat, a Lake Vostok expert at the Petersburg Nuclear Physics Institute in Gatchina, Russia, doubts that any of the cells or DNA fragments in the samples would belong to organisms that might actually exist in the lake. He says that it is very probable that the samples are heavily contaminated with tissue and microbes from the outside world. The possibility of contamination has been rejected by Scott Rogers.

In 2020, Colby Gura and Scott Rogers extended their study of Lake Vostok accretion ice, as well as the basal ice flowing into the lake. They found that the basal ice contained an almost completely different community of organisms compared to those found in the lake accretion ice, indicating that they signified two completely different ecosystems. Additional bacteria and eukaryotes were reported. The highest diversity of organisms in the lake ice was significantly associated (p<0.05) with higher concentrations of ions and amino acids. The 2020 study again found the presence of bacteria that inhabit fish intestines and a molecular sequence closest to a rock cod common along the coast of Antarctica, Notothenia coriiceps, which produces antifreeze proteins.

==== Russia and France ====
In 2013, Russian scientists conducted molecular DNA studies from water samples collected from Lake Vostok. Scientists have been able to identify 255 contaminant species, but also have found an unknown bacterium when they initially drilled down to the lake's surface in 2012, with no matches in any international databases, and they hope it may be a unique inhabitant of Lake Vostok. However, Vladimar Korolev, the laboratory head of the study at the same institution, said that the bacteria could in principle be a contaminant that uses kerosene—the antifreeze used during drilling—as an energy source.

In January 2015, the Russian press stated that Russian scientists have made a new "clean" borehole into Lake Vostok using a special 50-kilogram probe that collected about 1 liter of water not adulterated by the antifreezing fluid. The drilling technology used proved to be inappropriate to collect liquid water in general and clean samples in particular and results were unreported. It was predicted that the water would rise 30–40 m in the bottom part of the borehole, but in fact the water rose from the lake to a height of more than 500 m. In October of that same year, the work was suspended for that southern summer because of insufficient funding by the federal Russian government.

In 2019 the Russian government ordered that a new wintering complex be installed at the Lake Vostok research station, funded in part by Russian billionaire Leonid Mikhelson. This complex will be capable of supporting 35 people in the summer, 15 in the winter and will have 4 diesel generators with a capacity of 200 kilowatts each. The new complex, consisting of 133 modules, was delivered to Progress Station in December 2021 and will be transported to the Lake Vostok research station and installed over the next four years.

=== Contamination due to drilling fluids ===
The drilling project has been opposed by some environmental groups and scientists who have argued that hot-water drilling would have a more limited environmental impact. The main concern is that the lake could become contaminated with the antifreeze that the Russians used to keep the borehole from refreezing. Scientists of the United States National Research Council have taken the position that it should be assumed that microbial life exists in Lake Vostok and that after such a long isolation, any life forms in the lake require strict protection from contamination.

The original drilling technique employed by the Russians involved the use of Freon and kerosene to lubricate the borehole and prevent it from collapsing and freezing over; 60 short tons (54 t) of these chemicals have been used thus far on the ice above Lake Vostok. Other countries, particularly the United States and Britain, have failed to persuade the Russians not to pierce to the lake until cleaner technologies such as hot-water drilling are available. Though the Russians claim to have improved their operations, they continue to use the same borehole, which has already been contaminated with kerosene. According to the head of Russian Antarctic Expeditions, Valery Lukin, new equipment was developed by researchers at the Petersburg Nuclear Physics Institute that would ensure the lake remains uncontaminated upon intrusion. Lukin has repeatedly reassured other signatory nations to the Antarctic Treaty System that the drilling will not affect the lake, arguing that on breakthrough, water will rush up the borehole, freeze, and seal the other fluids out.

Some environmentalist groups remain unconvinced by these arguments. The Antarctic and Southern Ocean Coalition has argued that this manner of drilling is a profoundly misguided step that endangers Lake Vostok and other subglacial lakes in Antarctica (which some scientists are convinced are inter-linked with Lake Vostok). The coalition has asserted that "it would be far preferable to join with other countries to penetrate a smaller and more isolated lake before re-examining whether penetration of Lake Vostok is environmentally defensible. If we are wise, the Lake will be allowed to reveal its secrets in due course."

Lukin claims that hot-water drilling is much more dangerous for the microbiotic fauna, as it would boil the living species, and disturb the entire structure of water layers of the lake. Additionally, hot-water drilling would have required more power than the Russian expedition could have generated at their remote camp. However, the water samples obtained by the Russian team were heavily contaminated with drilling fluid, so they reported in May 2017 that it was impossible at this time to obtain reliable data on the real chemical and biological composition of the lake water.

== See also ==
- Groundwater – Water located beneath the ground surface
- Ledoyom – Geological term
