= 90 Degrees East =

Lake in Antarctica

- Location within Antarctica
- Location: Antarctica
- Coordinates: 77°24′S 90°0′E
- Type: subglacial
- Surface area: 2,000 km^{2} (770 sq mi)

90 Degrees East, also known as 90°E Lake, is a lake in Antarctica. With a surface area of about 2,000 square kilometres (770 mi^{2}), it is the second-largest known subglacial lake in Antarctica, after Lake Vostok. 90 Degrees East was discovered in January 2006, along with Sovetskaya. It is named after the 90th meridian east, on which it lies.

== See also ==
- Lake Vostok
- Sovetskaya (lake)
