= Sovetskaya (lake) =

Lake in Antarctica

Sovetskaya Lake
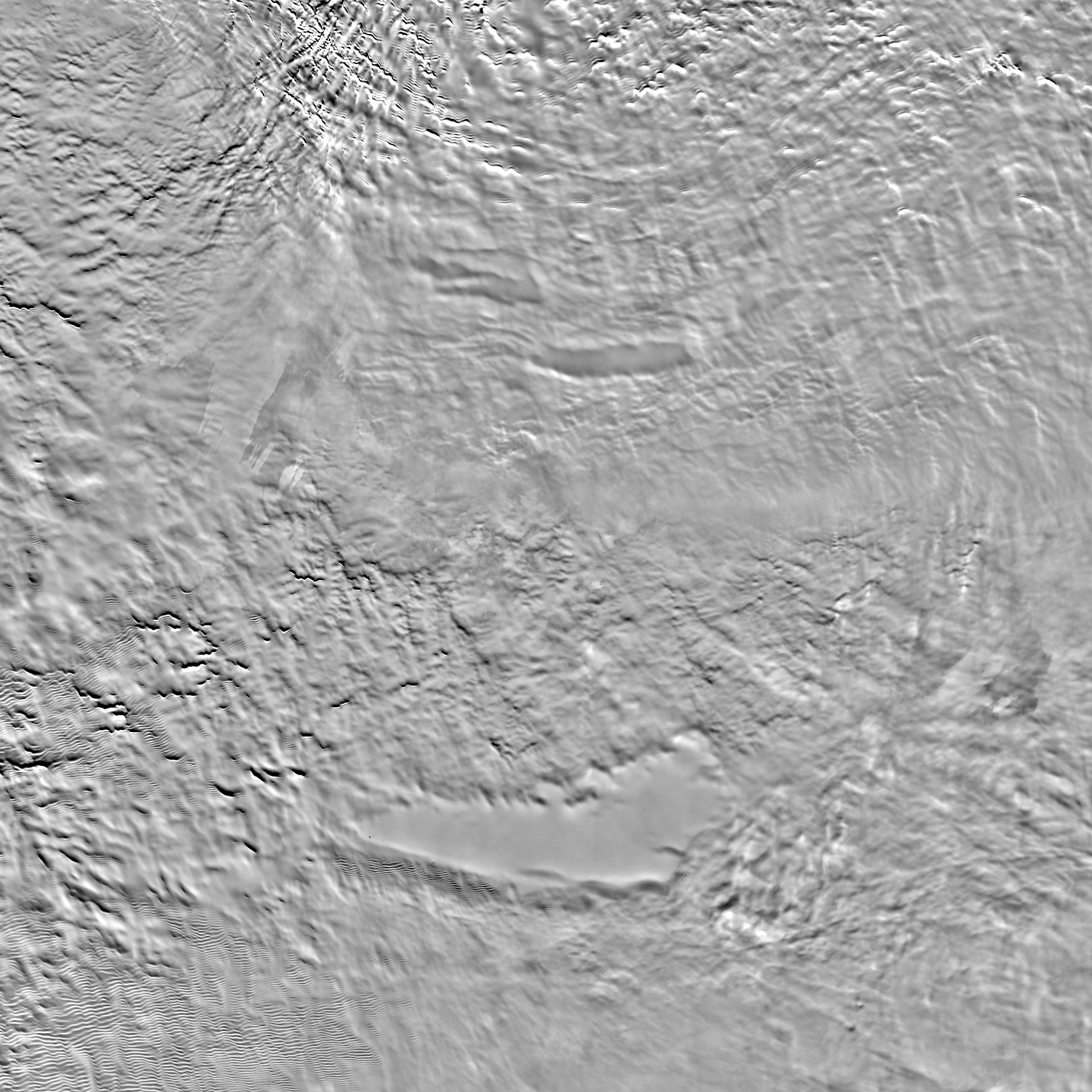
- A satellite greyscale image of 90° East Lake and Sovetskaya Lake

- Location within Antarctica
- Location: Antarctica
- Coordinates: 77°58′S 89°16′E
- Type: subglacial
- Basin countries: (Antarctica)
- Surface area: 1,600 km^{2} (620 sq mi)

Sovetskaya Lake is a liquid subglacial lake found buried under the Antarctic ice sheet, 2 kilometres (6,600 ft) below Sovetskaya Research Station. It covers about 1,600 square kilometres (620 mi^{2}).

== See also ==
- Lake Vostok (the largest subglacial lake in Antarctica)
- 90 Degrees East
- Sovetskaya (Antarctic Research Station)
