= Sovetskaya (Antarctic Research Station) =

Sovetskaya Station Советская
- Antarctic research station
- Location in Antarctica
- Coordinates: 78°23′00″S 87°32′00″E
- Region: Kaiser Wilhelm II Land
- Established: 17 February 1958
- Closed: 3 January 1959

Government
  - Type: Administration
  - Body: AARI, Soviet Union
- Elevation: 3,662 m (12,014 ft)
- Active times: All year-round

Sovetskaya was a Soviet research station in Kaiser Wilhelm II Land in Antarctica that was established on 16 February 1958 and closed on 3 January 1959.

The surface elevation was initially reported to be 3,570 metres (11,710 ft); however, it was later revised to 3,662 metres (12,014 ft). Reached on 16 February 1958 by the 3rd Soviet Antarctic Expedition for International Geophysical Year research work, it closed on 3 January 1959. Its WMO reporting ID was 89557.

== See also ==
- Sovetskaya (lake)
- List of Antarctic research stations
- List of Antarctic field camps
