= Ice drilling =

Method of drilling through ice

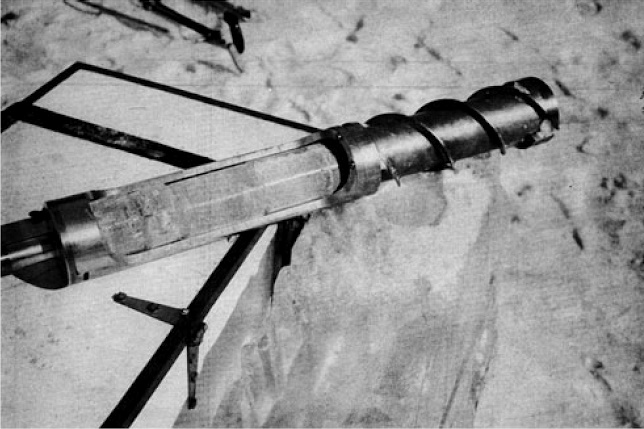
The ACFEL ice auger showing an ice core pushed up into the core remover barrel

Ice drilling allows scientists studying glaciers and ice sheets to gain access to what is beneath the ice, to take measurements along the interior of the ice, and to retrieve samples. Instruments can be placed in the drilled holes to record temperature, pressure, speed, direction of movement, and for other scientific research, such as neutrino detection.

Many different methods have been used since 1840, when the first scientific ice drilling expedition attempted to drill through the Unteraargletscher in the Alps. Two early methods were percussion, in which the ice is fractured and pulverized, and rotary drilling, a method often used in mineral exploration for rock drilling. In the 1940s, thermal drills began to be used; these drills melt the ice by heating the drill. Drills that use jets of hot water or steam to bore through ice soon followed. A growing interest in ice cores, used for palaeoclimatological research, led to ice coring drills being developed in the 1950s and 1960s, and there are now many different coring drills in use. For obtaining ice cores from deep holes, most investigators use cable-suspended electromechanical drills, which use an armoured cable to carry electrical power to a mechanical drill at the bottom of the borehole.

In 1966, a US team successfully drilled through the Greenland ice sheet at Camp Century, at a depth of 1,387 metres (4,551 ft). Since then many other groups have succeeded in reaching bedrock through the two largest ice sheets, in Greenland and Antarctica. Recent projects have focused on finding drilling locations that will give scientists access to very old undisturbed ice at the bottom of the borehole, since an undisturbed stratigraphic sequence is required to accurately date the information obtained from the ice.

== Goals of ice drilling ==
The first scientific ice drilling expeditions, led by Louis Agassiz from 1840 to 1842, had three goals: to prove that glaciers flowed, to measure the internal temperature of a glacier at different depths, and to measure the thickness of a glacier. Proof of glacier motion was achieved by placing stakes in holes drilled in a glacier and tracking their motion from the surrounding mountain. Drilling through glaciers to determine their thickness, and to test theories of glacier motion and structure, continued to be of interest for some time, but glacier thickness has been measured by seismographic techniques since the 1920s. Although it is no longer necessary to drill through a glacier to determine its thickness, scientists still drill shot holes in ice for these seismic studies. Temperature measurements continue to this day: modelling the behaviour of glaciers requires an understanding of their internal temperature, and in ice sheets, the borehole temperature at different depths can provide information about past climates. Other instruments may be lowered into the borehole, such as piezometers, to measure pressure within the ice, or cameras, to allow a visual review of the stratigraphy. IceCube, a large astrophysical project, required numerous optical sensors to be placed in holes 2.5 km deep, drilled at the South Pole.

Borehole inclination, and the change in inclination over time, can be measured in a cased hole, a hole in which a hollow pipe has been placed as a "liner" to keep the hole open. This allows the three-dimensional position of the borehole to be mapped periodically, revealing the movement of the glacier, not only at the surface, but throughout its thickness. To understand whether a glacier is shrinking or growing, its mass balance must be measured: this is the net effect of gains from fresh snow, minus losses from melting and sublimation. A straightforward way to determine these effects across the surface of a glacier is to plant stakes (known as ablation stakes) in holes drilled in the glacier's surface, and monitor them over time to see if more snow is accumulating, burying the stake, or if more and more of the stake is visible as the snow around it disappears. The discovery of layers of aqueous water and of several hundred mapped subglacial lakes, beneath the Antarctic ice sheet, led to speculation about the existence of unique microbial environments that had been isolated from the rest of the biosphere, potentially for millions of years. These environments can be investigated by drilling.

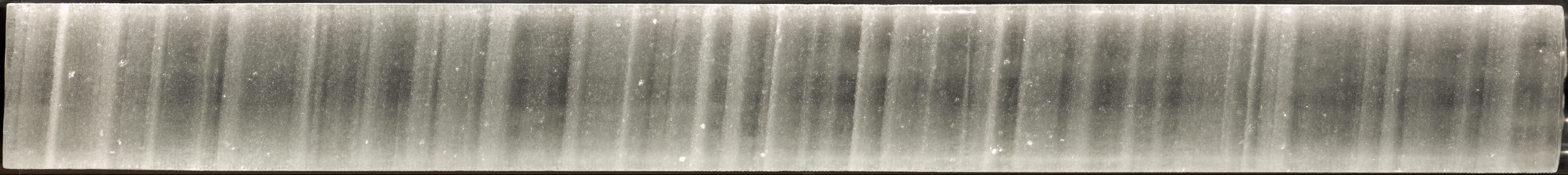
Part of the GISP2 ice core from 1837 to 1838 meters deep, in which annual layers are visible. The core was drilled in the early 1990s, and this picture covers some 38 years of accumulated ice, which dates from about 16,250 years ago. (original photo by NSF-Ice Core Facility)

Ice cores are one of the most important motivations for drilling in ice. Since ice cores retain environmental information about the time the ice in them fell as snow, they are useful in reconstructing past climates, and ice core analysis includes studies of isotopic composition, mechanical properties, dissolved impurities and dust, trapped atmospheric samples, and trace radionuclides. Data from ice cores can be used to determine past variations in solar activity, and is important in the construction of marine isotope stages, one of the key palaeoclimatic dating tools. Ice cores can also provide information about glacier flow and accumulation rates. IPICS (International Partnership in Ice Core Sciences) maintains a list of key goals for ice core research. Currently these are to obtain a 1.5 million year old core; obtain a complete record of the last interglacial period; use ice cores to assist with the understanding of climate changes over long time scales; obtain a detailed spatial array of ice core climate data for the last 2,000 years; and continue the development of advanced ice core drilling technology.

== Drilling design considerations ==
The constraints on ice drill designs can be divided into the following broad categories.

=== Ice removal method and project logistics ===
The ice must be cut through, broken up, or melted. Tools can be directly pushed into snow and firn (snow that is compressed, but not yet turned to ice, which typically happens at a depth of 60 metres (200 ft) to 120 metres (390 ft)); this method is not effective in ice, but it is perfectly adequate for obtaining samples from the uppermost layers. For ice, two options are percussion drilling and rotary drilling. Percussion drilling uses a sharp tool such as a chisel, which strikes the ice to fracture and fragment it. More common are rotary cutting tools, which have a rotating blade or set of blades at the bottom of the borehole to cut away the ice. For small tools the rotation can be provided by hand, using a T-handle or a carpenter's brace. Some tools can also be set up to make use of ordinary household power drills, or they may include a motor to drive the rotation. If the torque is supplied from the surface, then the entire drill string must be rigid so that it can be rotated; but it is also possible to place a motor just above the bottom of the drill string, and have it supply power directly to the drill bit.

If the ice is to be melted instead of cut, then heat must be generated. An electrical heater built into the drill string can heat the ice directly, or it can heat the material it is embedded in, which in turn heats the ice. Heat can also be sent down the drill string; hot water or steam pumped down from the surface can be used to heat a metal drillhead, or the water or steam can be allowed to emerge from the drillhead and melt the ice directly. In at least one case a drilling project experimented with heating the drillhead on the surface, and then lowering it into the hole.

Many ice drilling locations are very difficult to access, and drills must be designed so that they can be transported to the drill site. The equipment should be as light and portable as possible. It is helpful if the equipment can be broken down so that the individual components can be carried separately, thus reducing the burden for hand-carrying, if required. Fuel, for steam or hot water drills, or for a generator to provide power, must also be transported, and this weight has to be taken into account as well.

=== Cuttings and meltwater ===
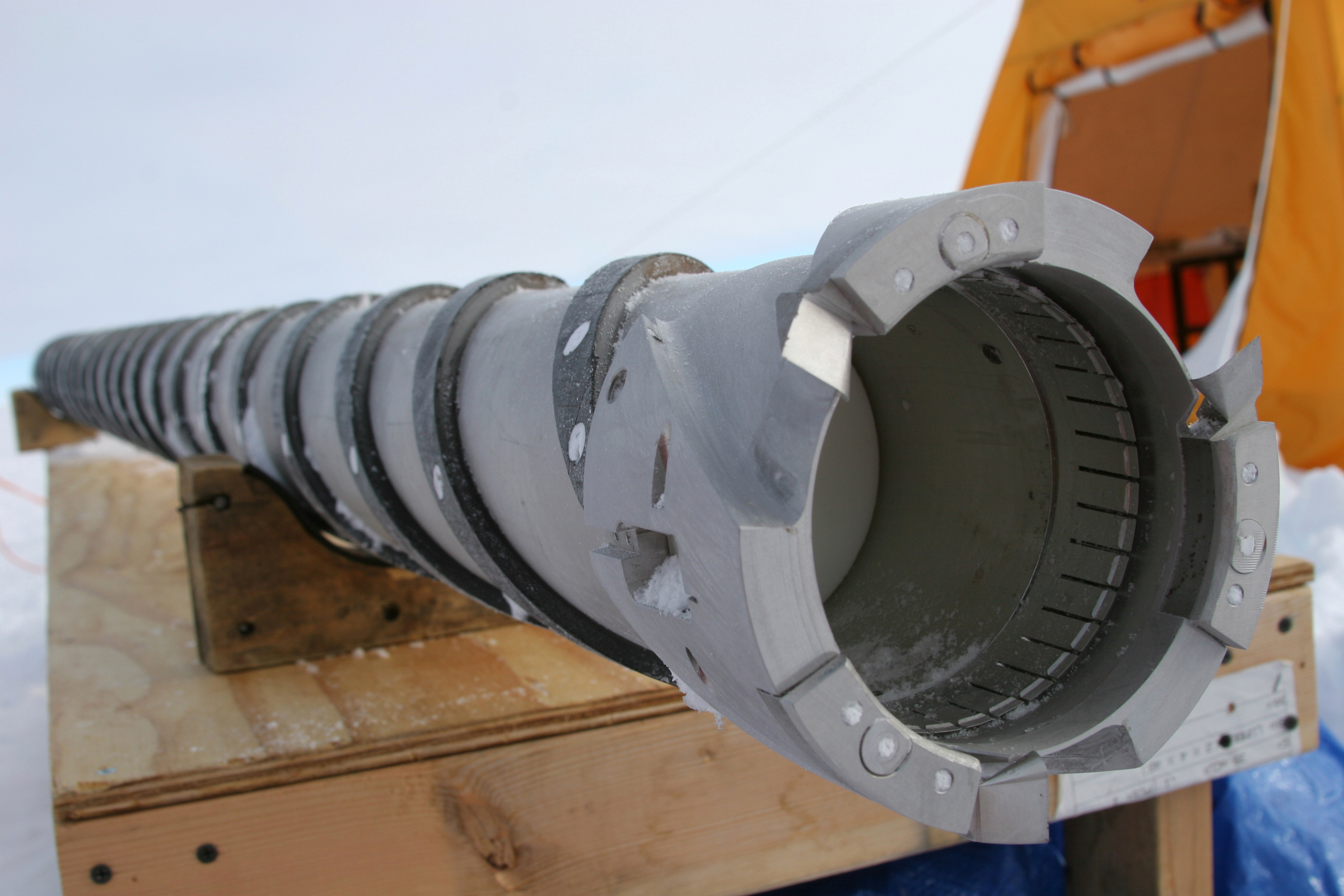
Mechanical ice auger, showing cutting teeth, helical flights used to transport ice cuttings up away from the cutting region, and a central void for the core itself.

Mechanical drilling produces pieces of ice, either as cuttings, or as granular fragments, which must be removed from the bottom of the hole to prevent them from interfering with the cutting or percussing action of the drill. An auger used as the cutting tool will naturally move ice cuttings up its helical flights. If the drill's action leaves the ice chips on top of the drill, they can be removed by simply raising the drill to the surface periodically. If not, they can be brought to the surface by lowering a tool to scoop them up, or the hole can be kept full of water, in which case the cuttings will naturally float to the top of the hole. If the chips are not removed, they must be compacted into the walls of the borehole, and into the core if a core is being retrieved.

Cuttings can also be moved to the surface by circulating compressed air through the hole, either by pumping the air through the drillpipe and out at the drillhead, forcing the chips up in the space between the drill string and the borehole wall, or by reverse air circulation, in which the air flows up through the drill string. Compressed air will be heated by the compression, and it must be cooled before being pumped downhole, or it will cause melting of the borehole walls and the core. If the air is circulated by creating a vacuum, rather than pumping air in, ambient air carries the cuttings, so no cooling is needed.

A fluid can be used to circulate the cuttings away from the bit, or the fluid may be able to dissolve the cuttings. Rotary mineral drilling (through rock) typically circulates fluid through the entire hole, and separates solids from the fluid at the surface before pumping the fluid back down. In deep ice drilling it is usual to circulate the fluid only at the bottom of the hole, collecting cuttings in a chamber that is part of the downhole assembly. For a coring drill, the cuttings chamber can be emptied each time the drill is brought to the surface to retrieve a core.

Thermal drills will produce water, so there are no cuttings to dispose of, but the drill must be capable of working while submerged in water, or else the drill must have a method of removing and storing the meltwater while drilling.

=== Drill string logistics ===
The drilling mechanism must be connected to the surface, and there must be a method of raising and lowering the drill. If the drill string consists of pipes or rods that have to be screwed together, or otherwise assembled, as the hole gets deeper and the drill string lengthens, then there must be a way to hold the drill string in place as each length of rod or pipe is added or removed. If the hole is only a few metres deep, no mechanical assistance may be necessary, but drill strings can get very heavy for deep holes, and a winch or other hoisting system must be in place that is capable of lifting and lowering it.

A "trip" in drilling refers to the task of pulling a drill string completely out of the hole (tripping out) and then reinserting it back into the hole (tripping in). Tripping time is the time taken to trip in and out of the hole; it is important for a drill design to minimize tripping time, particularly for coring drills, since they must complete a trip for each core.

=== Borehole stability and permeability ===
The overburden pressure in a deep hole from the weight of the ice above will cause a borehole to slowly close up, unless something is done to counteract it, so deep holes are filled with a drilling fluid that is about the same density as the surrounding ice, such as jet fuel or kerosene. The fluid must have low viscosity to reduce tripping time. Since retrieval of each segment of core requires a trip, a slower speed of travel through the drilling fluid could add significant time to a project—a year or more for a deep hole. The fluid must contaminate the ice as little as possible; it must have low toxicity, for safety and to minimize the effect on the environment; it must be available at a reasonable cost; and it must be relatively easy to transport. The depth at which borehole closure prevents dry drilling is strongly dependent on the temperature of the ice; in a temperate glacier, the maximum depth might be 100 metres (330 ft), but in a very cold environment such as parts of East Antarctica, dry drilling to 1,000 metres (3,300 ft) might be possible.

Snow and firn are permeable to air, water, and drilling fluids, so any drilling method that requires liquid or compressed air in the hole needs to prevent them from escaping into the surface layers of snow and firn. If the fluid is only used in the lower part of the hole, permeability is not an issue. Alternatively the hole can be cased down past the point where the firn turns to ice. If water is used as a drilling fluid, in cold enough temperatures, it will turn to ice in the surrounding snow and firn and seal the hole.

=== Power, torque, antitorque, and heat ===
Tools can be designed to be rotated by hand, via a brace or T-handle, or a hand crank gearing, or attached to a hand drill. Drills with powered rotation require an electrical motor at the rig site, which generally must have fuel, though in at least one case a drilling project was set up near enough to a permanent research station to run a cable to the research building for power. The rotation can be applied at the surface, by a rotary table, using a kelly, or by a motor in the drillhead, for cable-suspended drills; in the latter case the cable must carry power to the drillhead as well as support its weight. For rotary drills, gearing is required to reduce the engine's rotation to a suitable speed for drilling.

If torque is supplied at the bottom of the hole, the motor supplying it to the drillbit beneath it will have a tendency to rotate around its own axis, rather than imparting the rotation to the drillbit. This is because the drillbit will have a strong resistance to rotation since it is cutting ice. To prevent this, an anti-torque mechanism of some kind must be provided, typically by giving the motor some grip against the walls of the borehole.

A thermal drill that uses electricity to heat the drill head so that it melts the ice must bring power down the hole, just as with rotary drills. If the drillhead is heated by pumping water or steam down to the bottom of the hole, then no downhole power is needed, but a pump at the surface is required for hot water. The water or steam can be heated at the surface by a fuel-powered boiler. Solar power can also be used.

=== Directional control ===
Some drills which are designed to rest on their tip as they drill will lean to one side in the borehole, and the hole they drill will gradually drift towards the horizontal unless some method of counteracting this tendency is provided. For other drills, directional control can be useful in starting additional holes at depth, for example to retrieve additional ice cores.

=== Temperature ===
Many glaciers are temperate, meaning that they contain "warm ice": ice that is at melting temperature (0 °C) throughout. Meltwater in boreholes in warm ice will not refreeze, but for colder ice, meltwater is likely to cause a problem, and may freeze the drill in place, so thermal drills that operate submerged in the meltwater they produce, and any drilling method that results in water in the borehole, are difficult to use in such conditions. Drilling fluids, or antifreeze additives to meltwater, must be chosen to keep the fluid liquid at the temperatures found in the borehole. In warm ice, ice tends to form on cutters and the drillhead, and to pack into spaces at the bottom of the hole, slowing down drilling.

=== Core retrieval ===
To retrieve a core, an annulus of ice must be removed from around the cylindrical core. The core should be unbroken, which means that vibrations and mechanical shocks must be kept to a minimum, and changes in temperature which could cause thermal shock to the core must also be avoided. The core must be kept from melting caused by heat generated either mechanically from the drilling process, from the heat of compressed air if air is used as the drilling fluid, or from a thermal drill, and must not be contaminated by the drilling fluid. When the core is about to be retrieved, it is still connected to the ice beneath it, so some method of breaking it at the lower end must be provided, and of gripping it so it does not fall from the core barrel as it is brought to the surface, which must be done as quickly and safely as possible.

Most coring drills are designed to retrieve cores that are no longer than 6 metres (20 ft), so drilling must stop each time the hole depth is extended by that amount, so that the core can be retrieved. A drill string that must be assembled and disassembled in segments, such as pipe sections that must be screwed together, takes a long time to trip in and out; a cable which can be continuously winched up, or a drill string that is flexible enough to be coiled, significantly reduces tripping time. Wireline drills have a mechanism that allows the core barrel to be detached from the drill head and winched directly to the surface without having to trip out the drill string. Once the core is removed, the core barrel is lowered to the bottom of the hole and reattached to the drill.

=== Brittle ice ===
Over a depth range known as the brittle ice zone, bubbles of air are trapped in the ice under great pressure. When a core is brought to the surface, the bubbles can exert a stress that exceeds the tensile strength of the ice, resulting in cracks and spall. At greater depths, the ice crystal structure changes from hexagonal to cubic, and the air molecules move inside the crystals, in a structure called a clathrate. The bubbles disappear, and the ice becomes stable again.

The brittle ice zone typically returns poorer quality samples than for the rest of the core. Some steps can be taken to alleviate the problem. Liners can be placed inside the drill barrel to enclose the core before it is brought to the surface, but this makes it difficult to clean off the drilling fluid. In mineral drilling, special machinery can bring core samples to the surface at bottom-hole pressure, but this is too expensive for the inaccessible locations of most drilling sites. Keeping the processing facilities at very low temperatures limits thermal shocks. Cores are most brittle at the surface, so another approach is to break them into 1 m lengths in the hole. Extruding the core from the drill barrel into a net helps keep it together if it shatters. Brittle cores are also often allowed to rest in storage at the drill site for some time, up to a full year between drilling seasons, to let the ice gradually relax. Core quality in the brittle ice zone is much improved when a drilling fluid is used, as opposed to dry hole drilling.

== Percussion drills ==
A percussion drill penetrates ice by repeatedly striking it to fracture and fragment it. The cutting tool is mounted at the bottom of the drill string (typically connected metal rods (Note: A "drill string" is the set of equipment down the hole; if rigid pipe or rods are used to connect the drillhead to the surface, then everything between the drillhead and the surface is the drill string.)), and some means of giving it kinetic energy must be provided. A tripod erected over the hole allows a pulley to be set up, and a cable can then be used to repeatedly raise and drop the tool. This method is known as cable tool drilling. A weight repeatedly dropped on to a rigid drill string can also be used to provide the necessary impetus. The pulverized ice collects at the bottom of the borehole, and must be removed. It can be collected with a tool capable of scooping it from the bottom of the hole, or the hole can be kept full of water, so that the ice floats to the top of the hole, though this retards the momentum of the drill striking the ice, reducing its effectiveness. A percussion drilling tool that is not mechanically driven requires some method of raising the drill so it can be released, to fall on the ice. To do this efficiently with manual labour, it is usual to set up a tripod or other supporting scaffold, and a pulley to allow the drill string to be raised by a rope. This arrangement, known as a cable-tool rig, can also be used for mechanical drilling, with a motor raising the drill string and allowing it to fall. An alternative approach is to leave the drill string at the bottom of the borehole, and to raise and let fall a hammer weight onto the drill string.

The earliest scientific ice drilling expedition used percussion drilling; Louis Agassiz used iron rods to drill holes in the Unteraargletscher, in the Alps, in the summer of 1840. Cable-tool rigs have been used for ice drilling in more recent times; Soviet expeditions in the 1960s drilled with cable-tool rigs in the Caucasus and the Tien Shan range, and US projects have drilled on the Blue Glacier in Washington between 1969 and 1976, and on the Black Rapids Glacier in Alaska in 2002.

Two other percussion methods have been tried. Pneumatic drills have been used to drill shallow holes in ice in order to set blast charges, and rotary percussion drills, a type of drilling tool once in common use in the mining industry, have also been used for drilling blasting holes, but neither approach has been used for scientific investigations of ice. Percussion drilling is now rarely used for scientific ice drilling, having been overtaken by more effective techniques for both ice and mineral drilling.

== Hand-operated mechanical drills ==
=== Spoon-borers ===
A soil sampling auger contains a pair of blades at the bottom of an enclosed cylinder; it can be driven and rotated by hand to pick up soft soil. A similar design, called a spoon-borer, has been used for ice drilling, though it is not effective in hard ice. A version used by Erich von Drygalski in 1902 had two half-moon cutting blades set into the base of the cylinder in such a way as to allow the ice cuttings to accumulate in the cylinder, above the blades. (Note: Von Drygalski referred to the device he used in 1902 as a "Löffelbohrer"; Talalay translates this as "spoon-borer".)

=== Non-coring augers ===
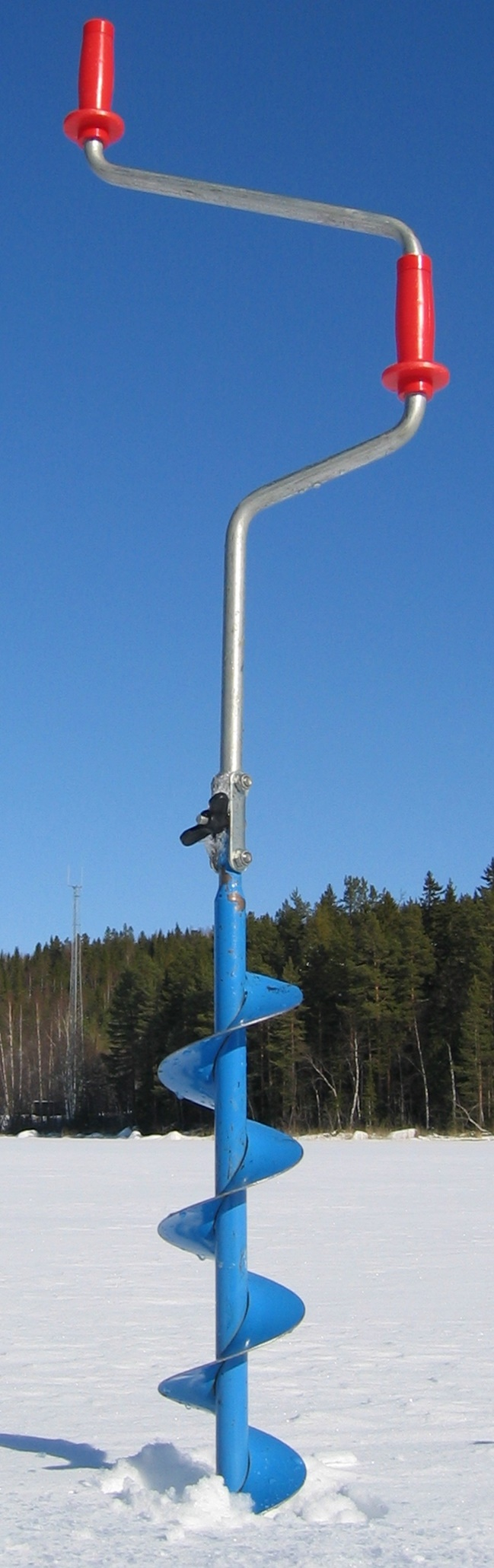
Ice auger with offset brace handle

Augers have long been used for drilling through ice for ice fishing. Augers can be rotated by hand, using a mechanism such as a T handle or a brace bit, or by attaching them to powered hand drills. Scientific uses for non-coring augers include sensor installation and determining ice thickness. Augers have a helical screw blade around the main drilling axis; this blade, called the "flighting", carries the ice cuttings up from the bottom of the hole. For drilling deeper holes, extensions can be added to the auger, but as the auger gets longer it becomes more difficult to rotate. With a platform such as a stepladder, a longer auger can be rotated from higher off the ground.

Commercially available ice augers for winter fishing, powered by petrol, propane, or battery power, are available for hole diameters from 4.5 in to 10 in. For holes deeper than 2 m a tripod can be used to winch the auger from the hole. A folding brace handle with an offset design is common; this allows both hands to contribute to the torque.

=== Coring augers ===
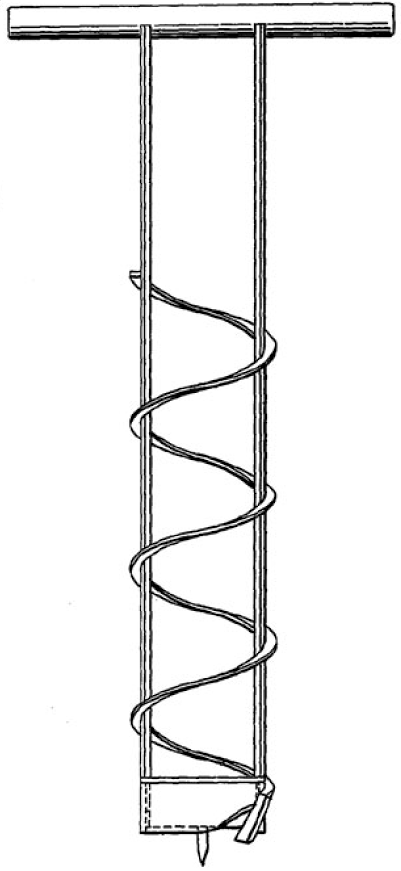
Coring ice auger with no barrel. Designs like this proved difficult to make sufficiently rigid.

Augers that are capable of retrieving ice cores are similar to non-coring augers, except that the flights are set around a hollow core barrel. Augers have been devised that consist of the helical cutting blades and a space for a core, without the central supporting cylinder, but they are difficult to make sufficiently rigid. Coring augers typically produce cores with diameters in the range 75–100 mm, and with lengths up to 1 m. Coring augers were originally designed to be manually rotated, but over time they have been adapted for use with handheld drills or small engines.

As with non-coring augers, extensions can be added to drill deeper. Drilling deeper than 6 m requires more than one person because of the weight of the drill string. A clamp placed at the surface is useful for supporting the string, and a tripod and block and tackle can also be used for support and to increase the weight of string that can be handled. As the drill string gets longer, it takes more time to complete a trip to extract a core, since each extension rod must be separated from the drill string when tripping out, and re-attached when tripping in.

Drilling with a tripod or other method of handling a long drill string considerably extends the depth limit for the use of a coring auger. The deepest hole drilled by hand with an auger was 55 m, in the Ward Hunt Ice Shelf on Ellesmere Island, in 1960. Usually a hole deeper than 30 m will be drilled with other methods, because of the weight of the drill string and the long trip time required.

Modern coring augers have changed little in decades: an ice coring auger patented in the US in 1932 closely resembles coring augers in use eighty years later. The US military's Frost Effects Laboratory (FEL) developed an ice mechanics testing kit that included a coring auger in the late 1940s; the Snow, Ice and Permafrost Research Establishment (SIPRE), a successor organization, refined the design in the early 1950s, and the resulting auger, known as the SIPRE auger, is still in wide use. It was modified slightly by the Cold Regions Research and Engineering Laboratory (CRREL), another successor organization, in the 1960s, and is sometimes known as the CRREL auger for that reason. An auger developed in the 1970s by the Polar Ice Core Office (PICO), then based in Lincoln, Nebraska, is also still widely used. A coring auger designed at the University of Copenhagen in the 1980s was used for the first time at Camp Century, and since then has been frequently used in Greenland. In 2009, the US Ice Drilling Design and Operations group (IDDO) began work on an improved hand auger design and a version was successfully tested in the field during the 2012–2013 field season at WAIS Divide. As of 2017 IDDO maintains both 3-inch and 4-inch diameter versions of the new auger for the use of US ice drilling research programs, and these are now the most-requested hand augers provided by IDDO.

The Prairie Dog auger, designed in 2007, adds an outer barrel to the basic coring auger design. Cuttings are captured between the auger flights and the outer barrel, which has an anti-torque section to prevent it from rotating in the hole. The goal of the outer barrel is to increase the efficiency of chip collection, since it is common to see chips from a hand auger run fall back into the hole from the auger flights, which means the next run has to redrill through these cuttings. The outer barrel also makes the auger effective in warm ice, which could easily cause an auger with no outer barrel to jam. The outside barrel of the Prairie Dog is the same as the diameter of the PICO auger, and since the Prairie Dog's anti-torque blades do not perform well in soft snow and firn, it is common to start a hole with the PICO auger and then continue it with the Prairie Dog once dense firn is reached. The Prairie Dog is relatively heavy, and can require two drillers to handle it as it is being removed from the hole. The IDDO maintains a Prairie Dog drill for the use of US ice drilling research programs.

IDDO also provides a lifting system for use with hand augers, known as the Sidewinder. It is driven by an electric hand drill, which can be powered by a generator or by solar cells. The Sidewinder winds a rope around the hand auger as it is lowered into the hole, and assists in raising the auger back out of the hole. This extends the maximum practical depth for hand augering to about 40 m. Sidewinders have proved popular with researchers.

=== Piston drills ===
A piston drill consists of a flat disc at the bottom of a long rod, with three or four radial slots in the disc, each of which has a cutting edge. The rod is rotated by hand, using a brace handle; the ice comes through the slots and piles up on top of the disc. Pulling the drill out of the borehole brings the cuttings up on the disc. In the 1940s some patents for piston drill designs were filed in Sweden and the U.S., but these drills are now rarely used. They are less efficient than auger drills, since the drill must be periodically removed from the hole to get rid of the cuttings.

=== Hand core drills and mini drills ===
Some hand drills have been designed to retrieve cores without using auger flights to transport the cuttings up the hole. These drills typically have a core barrel with teeth at the lower end, and are rotated by a brace or T-handle, or by a small engine. The barrel itself can be omitted, so that the drill consists only of a ring with a cutting slot to cut the annulus around the core, and a vertical rod to attach the ring to the surface. A couple of small hand-held drills, or mini drills, have been designed to quickly collect core samples up to 50 cm long. A difficulty with all these designs is that as soon as cuttings are generated, if they are not removed they will interfere with the cutting action of the drill, making these tools slow and inefficient in use. A very small drill, known as the Chipmunk Drill, was designed by IDDO for use by a project in West Greenland in 2003 and 2004, and was subsequently used at the South Pole in 2013.

== Rotary rigs using drillpipe ==
Rotary rigs used in mineral drilling use a string of drillpipe connected to a drillbit at the bottom of the hole, and to a rotary mechanism at the top of the hole, such as a top drive or rotary table and kelly. As the borehole deepens, drilling is paused periodically to add a new length of drill pipe at the top of the drill string. These projects have usually been undertaken with commercially available rotary rigs originally designed for mineral drilling, with adaptations to suit the special needs of ice drilling.

=== Dry drilling ===
When drilling in ice, the hole may be drilled dry, with no mechanism to dispose of the cuttings. In snow and firn this means that the cuttings simply compact into the walls of the borehole; and in coring drills they also compact into the core. In ice, the cuttings accumulate in the space between the drillpipe and the borehole wall, and eventually start to clog the drill bit, usually after no more than 1 m of progress. This increases the torque needed to drill, slows down progress, and can cause the loss of the drill. Dry core drilling generally produces a poor quality core that is broken into pieces.

In 1950, the French Expédition Polaires Françaises (EPF) drilled two dry holes in Greenland using a rotary rig, at Camp VI, on the west coast, and Station Centrale, inland, reaching 126 m and 151 m. Some shallow holes were also drilled that summer on Baffin Island, using a coring drill, and in the Antarctic, the Norwegian–British–Swedish Antarctic Expedition (NBSAE) drilled several holes between April 1950 and the following year, eventually reaching 100 m in one hole. The last expedition to try dry drilling in ice was the 2nd Soviet Antarctic Expedition (SAE), which drilled three holes between July 1957 and January 1958. Since that time dry drilling has been abandoned as other drilling methods have proved to be more effective.

=== Air circulation ===
Several holes have been drilled in ice using direct air circulation, in which compressed air is pumped down the drillpipe, to escape through holes in the drillbit, and return up the annular space between the drillbit and the borehole, carrying the cuttings with it. The technique was first tried by the 1st Soviet Antarctic Expedition, in October 1956. There were problems with poor cuttings removal, and ice forming in the borehole, but the drill succeeded in reaching a depth of 86.5 m. Further attempts were made to use air circulation with rotary rigs by US, Soviet and Belgian expeditions, with a maximum hole depth of 411 m reached by a US team at Site 2 in Greenland in 1957. The last time a project used a conventional rotary rig with air circulation was 1961.

=== Fluid circulation ===
In mineral exploration, the most common drilling method is a rotary rig with fluid circulated down the drillpipe and back up between the drillpipe and the borehole wall. The fluid carries the cuttings to the surface, where the cuttings are removed, and the recycled fluid, known as mud, is returned to the hole. The first ice drilling project to try this approach was an American Geographical Society expedition to the Taku Glacier in 1950. Fresh water, drawn from the glacier, was used as the drilling fluid, and three holes were drilled, to a maximum depth of 89 m. Cores were retrieved, but in poor condition. Seawater has also been tried as a drilling fluid. The first time a fluid other than water was used with a conventional rotary rig was in late 1958, at Little America V, where diesel fuel was used for the last few metres of a 254 m hole.

=== Wireline ===
A wireline drill uses air or fluid circulation, but also has a tool that can be lowered into the drillpipe to retrieve a core without removing the drill string. The tool, called an overshot, latches onto the core barrel and pulls it up to the surface. When the core is removed, the core barrel is lowered back into the borehole and reattached to the drill. A wireline core drilling project was planned in the 1970s for the International Antarctic Glaciological Project, but was never completed, and the first wireline ice drilling project took place in 1976, (Note: Bentley et al. assert that the drill used on Taku Glacier in 1950 by Maynard Miller was a wireline drill, but Talalay gives a detailed description of the drill and lists it as non-wireline.) as part of the Ross Ice Shelf Project (RISP). A hole was started in November of that year with a wireline drill, probably using air circulation, but problems with the overshot forced the project to switch to thermal drilling when the hole was 103 m deep. The RISP project reached over 170 m with another wireline drill the following season, and several 1980s Soviet expedition also used wireline drills, after starting the holes with an auger drill and casing the holes. The Agile Sub-Ice Geological (ASIG) drill, designed by IDDO to collect sub-glacial cores, is a recent wireline system; it was first used in the field in the 2016–2017 season, in West Antarctica.

=== Assessment ===
There are many disadvantages to using conventional rotary rigs for ice drilling. When a conventional rotary rig is used for coring, the entire drill string must be hoisted out of the borehole each time the core is retrieved; each length of pipe in turn must be unscrewed and racked. As the hole gets deeper, this becomes very time-consuming. Conventional rigs are very heavy, and since many ice drilling sites are not easily accessible these rigs place a large logistical burden on an ice drilling project. For deep holes, a drilling fluid is required to maintain pressure in the borehole and prevent the hole from closing up because of the pressure the ice is under; a drilling fluid requires additional heavy equipment to circulate and store the fluid, and to separate the circulated material. Any circulation system also requires the upper part of the hole, through the snow and firn, to be cased, since circulated air or fluid would escape through anything more permeable than ice. Commercial rotary rigs are not designed for extremely cold temperatures, and in addition to problems with components such as the hydraulics and fluid management systems, they are designed to operate outdoors, which is impractical in extreme environments such as Antarctic drilling.

Commercial rotary rigs can be effective for large-diameter holes, and can also be used for subglacial drilling into rock. They have also been used with some success for rock glaciers, which are challenging to drill because they contain a heterogeneous mixture of ice and rock.

== Flexible drillstem rigs ==
Flexible drillstem rigs use a drill string that is continuous, so that it does not have to be assembled or disassembled, rod by rod or pipe by pipe, when tripping in or out. The drill string is also flexible, so that when out of the borehole it can be stored on a reel. The drill string may be a reinforced hose, or it may be steel or composite pipe, in which case it is known as a coiled-tubing drill. Rigs designed along these lines began to appear in the 1960s and 1970s in mineral drilling, and became commercially viable in the 1990s.

Only one such rig, the rapid air movement (RAM) system developed at the University of Wisconsin-Madison by Ice Coring and Drilling Services (ICDS), has been used for ice drilling. The RAM drill was developed in the early 2000s, and was originally designed for drilling shot holes for seismic exploration. The drill stem is a hose through which air is pumped; the air drives a turbine that powers a downhole rotary drill bit. Ice cuttings are removed by the exhaust air and fountain out of the hole. The compressor increases the temperature of the air by about 50°, and it is cooled again before being pumped downhole, with a final temperature about 10° warmer than the ambient air. This means it cannot be used in ambient temperatures warmer than −10 °C. To avoid ice forming in the hose, ethanol is added to the compressed air. The system, which includes a winch to hold 100 m of hose, as well as two air compressors, is mounted on a sled. It has successfully drilled hundreds of holes in West Antarctica, and was easily able to drill to 90 m in only 25 minutes, making it the fastest ice drill. It was also used by the Askaryan Radio Array project in 2010–2011 at the South Pole, but was unable to drill below 63 m there because of variations in the local characteristics of the ice and firn. It cannot be used in a fluid-filled hole, which limits the maximum hole depth for this design. The main problem with the RAM drill is a loss of air circulation in firn and snow, which might be addressed by using reverse air circulation, via a vacuum pump drawing air up through the hose. As of 2017 IDDO is planning a revised design for the RAM drill to reduce the weight of the drill, which is currently 10.3 tonnes.

Other flexible drill stem designs have been considered, and in some cases tested, but as of 2016 none had been successfully used in the field. One design suggested using hot water to drill via a hose, and replacing the drillhead with a mechanical drill for coring once the depth of interest is reached, using the hot water both to hydraulically power the down hole motor, and to melt the resulting ice cuttings. Another design, the RADIX drill, produces a very narrow hole (20 mm) and is intended for rapid drilling access holes; it uses a small hydraulic motor on a narrow hose. It was tested in 2015 but found to have difficulty with cuttings transport, probably because of the very narrow space available between the hose and the borehole wall.

Coiled-tubing designs have never been successfully used for ice drilling. Coring operations would be particularly difficult, since a coring drill must trip out and in for each core, which would lead to fatigue; the tubing is typically rated for a lifetime of only 100 to 200 trips.

== Cable-suspended electromechanical drills ==
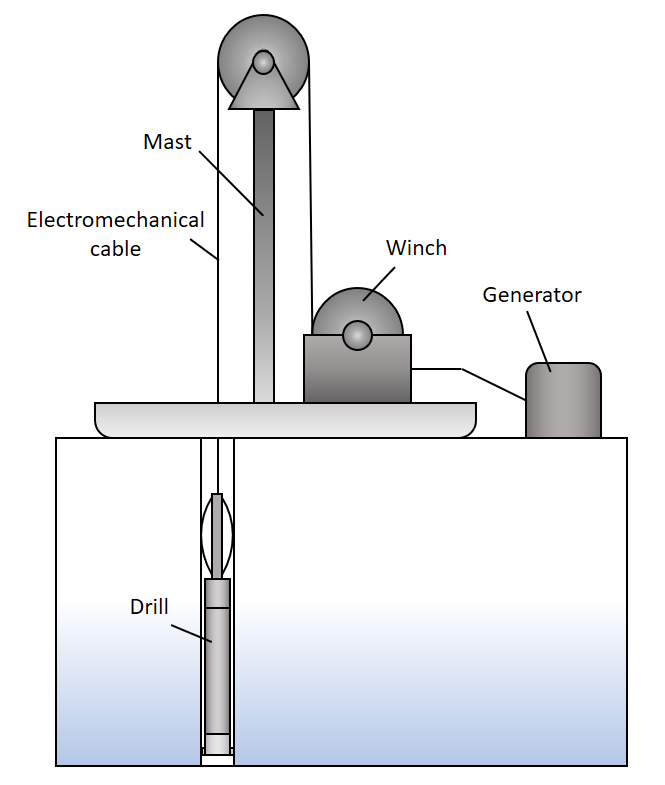
Schematic of cable-suspended ice core drilling system

A cable-suspended drill has a downhole system, known as a sonde, to drill the hole. The sonde is connected to the surface by an armoured cable, which provides power and enables the drill to be winched in and out of the hole. Electromechanical (EM) cable-suspended drills have a cutting head, with blades that shave the ice as they rotate, like a carpenter's plane. The depth of penetration of the cut is adjusted by a device called a shoe, which is part of the cutting head. The ice cuttings are stored in a chamber in the sonde, either in the core barrel, above the core, or in a separate chamber, further up the drill.

The cuttings can be transported by auger flights or by fluid circulation. Drills that rely on auger flights and which are not designed to work in a fluid-filled hole are limited to depths at which borehole closure is not a problem, so these are known as shallow drills. Deeper holes have to be drilled with drilling fluid, but whereas circulation in a rotary drill takes the fluid all the way down and then up the borehole, cable-suspended drills only need to circulate the fluid from the drill head up to the cuttings chamber. This is known as bottom-hole circulation.

The upper part of the sonde has an antitorque system, which most commonly consists of three or four leaf-springs that press out against the borehole walls. Sharp edges on the leaf springs catch in the walls and provide the necessary resistance to prevent this part of the drill from rotating. At the point where the cable connects to the sonde, most drills include a slip ring, to allow the drill to rotate independently of the cable. This is to prevent torque damage to the cable if the anti-torque system fails. Coring drills may also have a weight that can be used as a hammer to assist in breaking the core, and a chamber for any instrumentation or sensors needed.

At the bottom of the sonde is the cutting head, and above this is the core barrel, with auger flights around it on shallow drills, and typically an outer barrel around that, usually with internal vertical ribs or some other way of providing additional impetus to the upward-bound cuttings on the flights. If there is a separate chip chamber it will be above the core barrel. The motor, with suitable gearing, is also above the core barrel.

Shallow drills can retrieve cores up to 300–350 m deep, but core quality is much improved if drilling fluid is present, so some shallow drills have been designed to work in wet holes. Tests reported in 2014 showed that wet drilling, with the top of the drilling fluid no deeper than 250 m, would maintain good core quality.

Drilling fluids are necessary for drilling deep holes, so the cable-suspended drills that are used for these projects use a pump to provide fluid circulation, in order to remove the cuttings from the bit. A few drills designed for use with drilling fluid also have auger flights on the inner barrel. As with shallow drills, the cuttings are stored in a chamber above the core. The circulation can be in either direction: down the inside of the drill string, and up between the core barrel and the borehole wall, or in the reverse direction, which has become the favoured approach in drill design as it gives better cuttings removal for a lower flow rate. Drills capable of reaching depths over 1500 m are known as deep drilling systems; they have generally similar designs to the intermediate systems that can drill from 400 m to 1500 m, but must have heavier and more robust systems such as winches, and have longer drills and larger drilling shelters. Core diameters for these drills have varied from 50 mm to 132 mm, and the core length from as short as 0.35 m up to 6 m. A common design feature of these deep drills is that they can be tipped to the horizontal to make it easier to remove the core and the cuttings. This reduces the required height of the mast, but requires a deep slot to be cut into the ice, to make room for the sonde to swing up.

The first cable-suspended electromechanical drill was invented by Armais Arutunoff for use in mineral drilling; it was tested in 1947 in Oklahoma, but did not perform well. CRREL acquired a reconditioned Arutunoff drill in 1963, modified it for drilling in ice, and in 1966 used it to extend a hole at Camp Century in Greenland to the base of the ice cap, at 1387 m, and 4 m further into the bedrock.

Many other drills have since been based on this basic design. A recent variation on the basic EM drill design is the Rapid Access Isotope Drill, designed by the British Antarctic Survey to drill dry holes to 600 m. This drill does not collect a complete ice core; instead it will collect ice cuttings, using a cutting head similar to a spoonborer. The resulting access hole will be used for temperature profiling, and along with the isotope results which will indicate the age of the ice, the data will be used for modeling the ice profile down to bedrock in order to determine the best place to drill to obtain the oldest possible undisturbed basal ice. The drill is expected to reach 600 m in 7 days of drilling, rather than the 2 months which would be needed to drill a core; the speed is because the cutters can be more aggressive as core quality is not an issue, and because the borehole is narrow which reduces power requirements for the winch.

== Thermal drills ==
Thermal drills work by applying heat to the ice at the bottom of the borehole to melt it. Thermal drills in general are able to drill successfully in temperate ice, where an electromechanical drill is at risk of jamming because of ice forming in the borehole. When used in colder ice, some form of antifreeze is likely to be introduced into the borehole to prevent the meltwater from freezing in the drill.

=== Hot water and steam drills ===
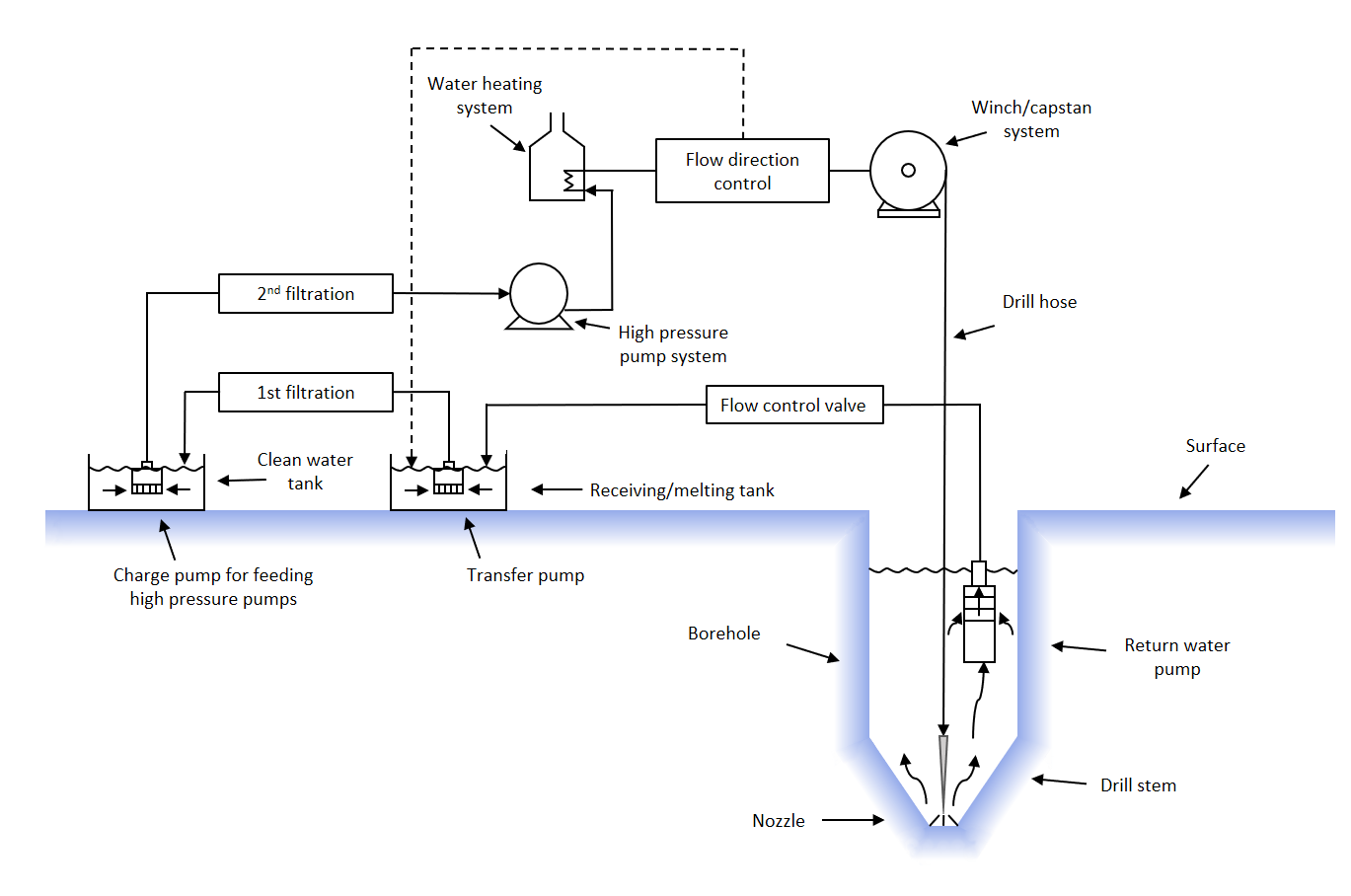
Schematic of a hot water drill

Hot water can be used to drill in ice by pumping it down a hose with a nozzle at the end; the jet of hot water will quickly produce a hole. Letting the hose dangle freely will produce a straight hole; as the hole gets deeper the weight of the hose makes this hard to manage manually, and at a depth of about 100 m it becomes necessary to run the hose over a pulley and enlist some method to help lower and raise the hose, usually consisting of a hose reel, capstan, or some type of hose assist. Since the pressure in the hose is proportional to the square of the flow, hose diameter is one of the limiting factors for a hot-water drill. To increase flow rate beyond a certain point, the hose diameter must be increased, but this will require significant capacity increases elsewhere in the drill design. Hoses that are wrapped around a drum before being pressurized will exert constricting force on the drum, so the drums must be of robust design. Hoses must wrap neatly when spooling up, to avoid damage; this can be done manually for smaller systems, but for very large drills a level-wind system has to be implemented. The hose ideally should have the tensile strength to support its weight when spooling into the hole, but for very deep holes a supporting cable may need to be used to support the hose.

Steam can also be used in place of hot water, and does not need to be pumped. A handheld steam drill is able to rapidly drill short holes, for example for ablation stakes, and both steam and hotwater drills can be made light enough to be hand carried. A guide tube can be used to help keep the borehole straight.

In cold ice, a borehole drilled with hot water will close up as the water freezes. To avoid this, the drill can be run back down the hole, warming the water and hence the surrounding ice. This is a form of reaming. Repeated reamings will raise the temperature of the surrounding ice to the point where the borehole will stay open for longer periods. However, if the goal is to measure temperature in the borehole, then it is better to apply as little additional heat as possible to the surrounding ice, which means that a higher energy drill with a high water flow rate is desirable, since this will be more efficient. If there is a risk of the drill freezing in, a "back drill" can be included in the design. This is a mechanism which redirects the hot water jet upwards if the drill meets with resistance on tripping out. A separate hot water reamer can also be used, jetting hot water sideways onto the borehole walls as it passes.

Boreholes drilled with hot water are rather irregular, which makes them unsuitable for certain kinds of investigations, such as speed of borehole closure, or inclinometry measurements. The warm water from the nozzle will continue to melt the borehole walls as it rises, and this will tend to make the hole cone-shaped—if the hole is being drilled at a location with no surface snow or firn, such as an ablation zone in a glacier, then this effect will persist to the top of the borehole.

The water supply for a hot water drill can come from water at the surface, if available, or melted snow. The meltwater in the borehole can be reused, but this can only be done once the hole penetrates below the firn to the impermeable ice layer, because above this level the meltwater escapes. The pump to bring the meltwater back to the surface must be placed below this level, and in addition, if there is a chance that the borehole will penetrate to the base of the ice, the drilling project must plan for the likelihood that this will change the water level in the hole, and ensure that the pump is below the lowest likely level. Heating systems are usually adapted from the heaters used in the pressure washer industry.

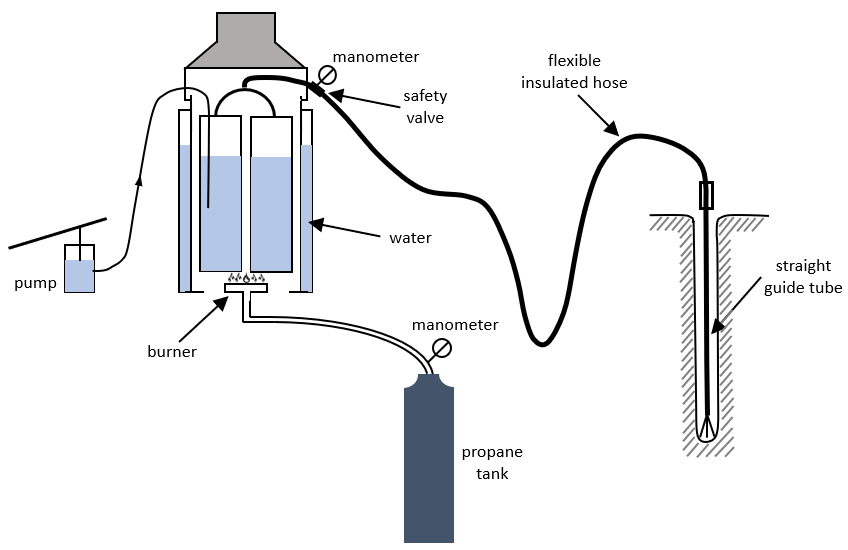
Schematic of a steam drill

When any thermal drilling method is used in dirty ice, the debris will accumulate at the bottom of the borehole, and start to impede the drill; enough debris, in the form of sand, pebbles, or a large rock, could completely stop progress. One way to avoid this is to have a nozzle angled at 45°; using this nozzle will create a side channel into which the obstructions will go. Vertical drilling can then start again, bypassing the debris. Another approach is to recirculate the water at the bottom of the hole, with an electrical heater embedded in the drill head and filters in the circulation. This can remove most of the small debris that impedes the drillhead.

A different problem with impure ice comes from contaminants brought in by the project, such as clothing and wood fibres, dust, and grit. Using snow from around the campsite to supply the drill with water is often necessary at the start of drilling, as the hole will not yet have reached the impermeable ice, so water cannot be pumped back up from the bottom of the hole; shoveling this snow into the drill's water supply will pass these contaminants through the drill mechanism, and can damage the pumps and valves. A fine filter is required to avoid these problems.

An early expedition using hot water drills was in 1955, to the Mer de Glace; Électricité de France used hot water to reach the base of the glacier, and also used equipment that sprayed multiple jets simultaneously to create a tunnel under the ice. More development work was done in the 1970s. Hot water drills are now capable of drilling very deep holes and capable of clean access for sub glacial lakes: for example, between 2012 and 2019 on the WISSARD/SALSA project, the WISSARD drill, a mid-sized hot water drill, drilled clean access up to 1 km at Lake Mercer in Antarctica; and between 2004 and 2011, a large hot water drill at the South Pole was used to drill 86 holes to a depth of 2.5 km to set strings of sensors in the boreholes, for the IceCube project. Hot water coring drills have also been developed but are susceptible to debris stopping forward motion in dirty ice.

An early steam drill was developed by F. Howorka in the early 1960s for work in the Alps. Steam drills are not used for holes deeper than 30 m, as they are quite inefficient due to thermal losses along the hose, and pressure losses with increasing depth under water. They are primarily used for quickly drilling shallow holes.

=== Hotpoints ===
Instead of using a jet of hot water or steam, thermal drills can also be constructed to provide heat to a durable drillhead, for example by pumping hot water down and back up again inside the drill string, and use that to melt the ice. Modern thermal drills use electrical power to heat the drillhead instead.

It is possible to drill with a hotpoint that consists of an electrical heating element, directly exposed to the ice; this means that the element must be able to work underwater. Some drills instead embed the heating element in a material such as silver or copper that will conduct the heat quickly to the hotpoint surface; these can be constructed so that the electrical connections are not exposed to water. Electrothermal drills require a cable to bring the power down the hole; the circuit can be completed via the drillpipe if one is present. A transformer is needed in the drill assembly since the cable must carry high voltage to avoid power dissipation. It is more difficult to arrange electrical power at a remote location than to generate heat via a gas boiler, so hotpoint drills are only used for boreholes up to a few hundred metres deep.

The earliest attempt to use heat to drill in ice was in 1904, when C. Bernard, drilling at the Tête Rousse Glacier, tried using heated iron bars to drill with. The ends of the bars were heated until incandescent, and lowered into the borehole. The first true hotpoint was used by Mario Calciati in 1942 on the Hosand Glacier. Calciati pumped hot water from the surface down the drillstem, and back up after it had passed through the drillhead. Other hotpoint designs have used electrical heating to heat the drillhead; this was done in 1948 by a British expedition to the Jungfraujoch, and by many other drill designs since then. Hotpoints do not produce cores, so they are used primarily for creating access holes.

=== Electrothermal coring drills ===
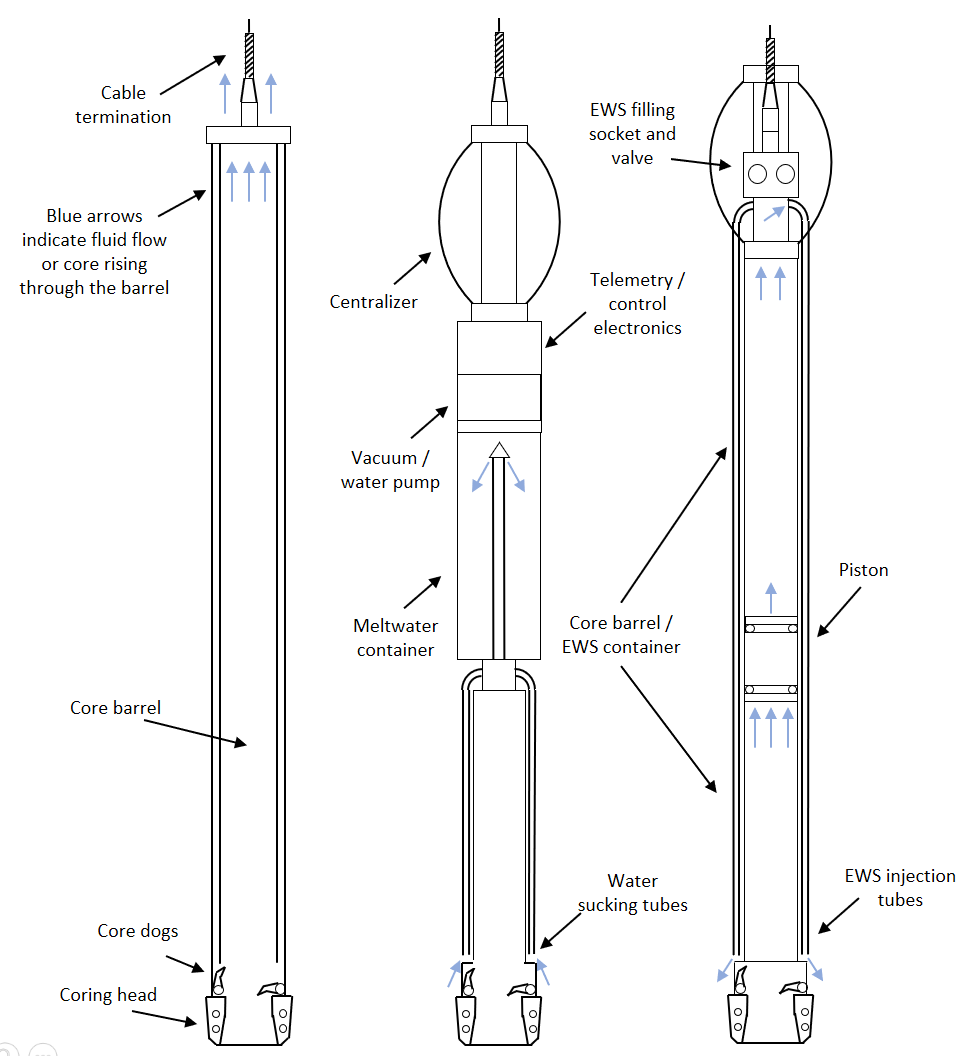
Three thermal drill designs

The development in the 1960s of thermal coring drills for intermediate depth holes was prompted by the problems associated with rotary coring drills, which were too costly to use for polar ice cores because of the logistical problems caused by their weight. The components of a thermal drill are generally the same as for a cable-suspended EM drill: both have a mast and winch, and an armoured cable to provide power downhole to a sonde, which includes a core barrel. No antitorque system is needed for a thermal drill, and instead of a motor that provides torque, the power is used to generate heat in the cutting head, which is ring shaped to melt an annulus of ice around the core. Some drills may also have a centralizer, to keep the sonde in the middle of the borehole.

The sonde of an electrothermal drill designed to run submerged in meltwater may consist almost entirely of the core barrel plus the heated cutting head (diagram (a) in the figure to the right). Alternative designs for use in colder ice (see diagram (b) at right) may have a compartment above the core barrel, and tubes that run down to just above the cutting head; a vacuum pump sucks up the meltwater. In these drills the meltwater must be emptied at the surface at the end of each coring run.

Another approach (see (c) at right) is to use a drilling fluid that is a mixture of ethanol and water, with the exact proportions determined by the ice temperature. In these drills there is a piston above the core barrel and at the start of a run the piston is at the bottom of the sonde, and the space above is filled with drilling fluid. As the drills cuts downwards, the core pushes the piston up, pumping the fluid down and out around the cutting head, where it mixes with the meltwater and prevents it from freezing. The piston is the only moving part, which simplifies the design; and the core barrel can take up much of the length of the sonde, whereas drills which suck out the meltwater in order to drill in a dry hole have to sacrifice a large section of the sonde for meltwater storage.

Thermal drills designed for temperate ice are light and straightforward to operate, which makes them suitable for use on high-altitude glaciers, though this also requires that the drill can be disassembled into components for human-powered transport to the most inaccessible locations, since helicopters may not be able to reach the highest glaciers.

Electrothermal drill designs date back to the 1940s. An electrothermal drill was patented in Switzerland in May 1946 by René Koechlin, and was used in Switzerland, and in 1948 a British expedition to the Jungfraujoch drilled to the bed of the glacier using an electrothermal design. Twenty electrothermal coring drills were designed between 1964 and 2005, though many designs were abandoned because of the higher performance of EM coring drills.

== Autonomous probes ==
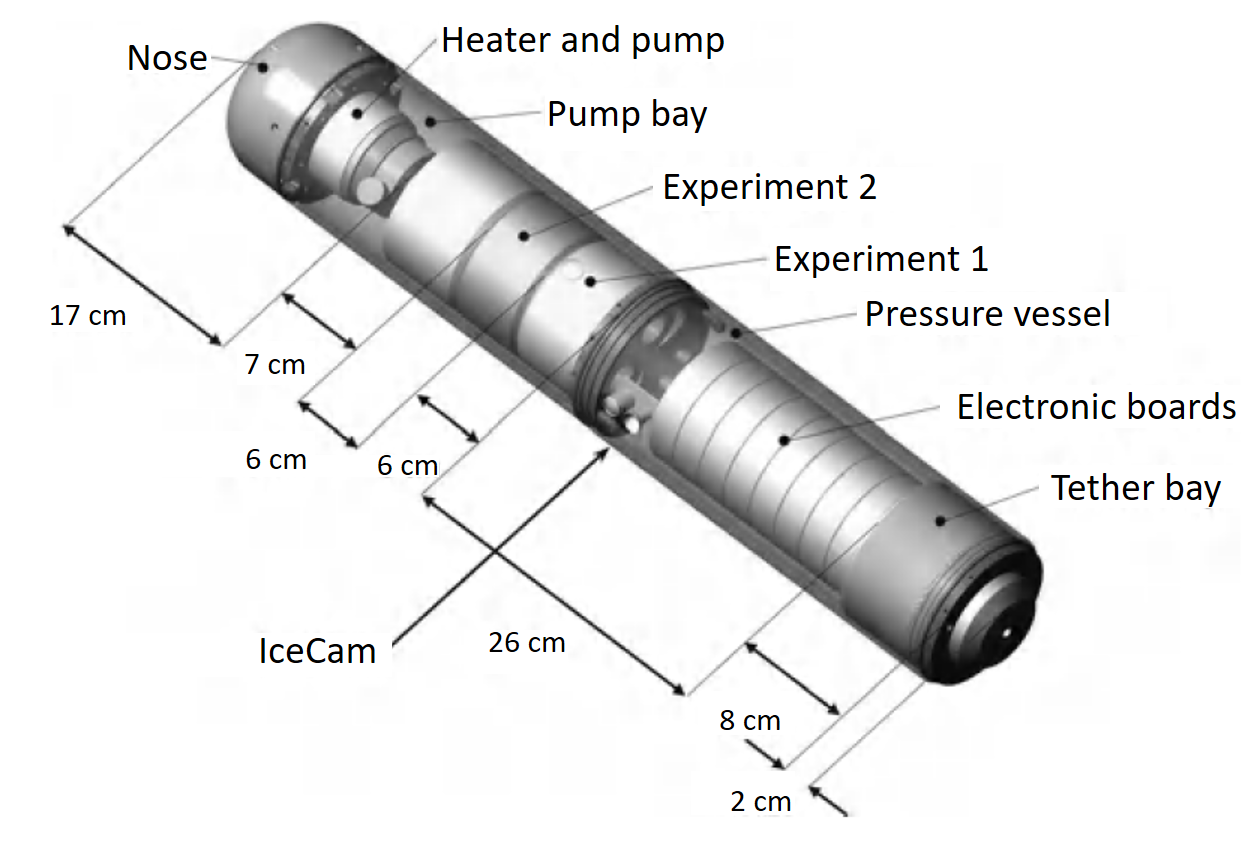
Cryobot design for NASA Martian ice cap probe, partly built in 2001

If the goal is to obtain instrument readings from within the ice, and there is no need to retrieve either the ice or the drill system, then a probe containing a long spool of cable and a hotpoint can be used. The hotpoint allows the probe to melt its way through the ice, unreeling the cable behind it. The meltwater will refreeze, so the probe cannot be recovered, but it can continue to penetrate the ice until it reaches the limit of the cable it carries, and send instrument readings back up through the cable to the surface. Known as Philberth probes, these devices were designed by Karl and Bernhard Philberth in the 1960s as a way to store nuclear waste in the Antarctic, but were never used for that purpose. Instead, they were adapted to use for glaciological research, reaching a depth of 1005 metres and sending temperature information back to the surface when tested in 1968 as part of the Expédition Glaciologique Internationale au Groenland (EGIG).

Because thermal probes support their weight on the ice at the bottom of the borehole, they lean slightly out of the vertical, and this means they have a natural tendency to stray away from a vertical borehole towards the horizontal. Various methods have been proposed to address this. A cone-shaped tip, with a layer of mercury above the tip, will cause additional heat transfer to the lower side of a slanting borehole, increasing the speed of melting on that side, and returning the borehole to the vertical. Alternatively the probe can be constructed to be supported by ice above its centre of gravity, by providing two heating rings, one of which is towards the top of the probe, and has a greater diameter than the rest of the probe. Giving this upper ring a slightly lower heating power will cause the probe to have more bearing pressure on the upper ring, which will give it a natural tendency to swing back to vertical if the borehole starts to deviate. The effect is called pendulum steering, by analogy with the tendency of a pendulum always to swing back towards a vertical position.

In the 1990s NASA combined the Philberth probe design with ideas drawn from hot-water drills, to design a cryobot probe that had hot water jets in addition to a hotpoint nose. Once the probe was submerged in a thin layer of meltwater, the water was drawn in and reheated, emerging at the nose as a jet. This design was intended to help move particulate matter away from the nose, as a hot-water drill tends to. A version with no analytical tools on board was built and field tested in Svalbard, Norway, in 2001. It penetrated to 23 m, successfully passing through layers of particulates.

Cryobots remain in good thermal contact with the surrounding ice throughout their descent, and in very cold ice this can drain a substantial fraction of their power budget, which is finite since they must carry their power source with them. This makes them unsuitable for investigating the Martian polar ice cap. Instead, NASA added a pump to the cryobot design, to raise meltwater to the surface, so that the probe, known as the SIPR (for Subsurface Ice Probe) descends in a dry hole. The lower gravity on Mars means that the overburden pressure on the ice cap is much less, and an open borehole is expected to be stable to a depth of 3 km, the expected depth of the ice cap. The meltwater can then be analyzed at the surface. Pumping through a vertical tube will cause mixing, so to ensure discrete samples for analysis at the surface, a large bore and a small bore tube are used; the small bore tube is used for sampling, and then its contents are allowed to return to the probe and are pumped back up the large bore tube for use in experiments that do not depend on stratigraphy, such as searches for living organisms. Leaving the analytical instruments on the surface reduces the necessary size of the probe, which helps make this design more efficient.

Along with the water transport tubes, a heated wire ensures that the water stays liquid all the way to the surface, and power and telemetry is also carried from the surface. To keep the hole vertical the probe can sense when it is deviating, and the jets of hot water are adjusted to compensate. The drill is expected to make use of solar power in operation, meaning it must be able to function on less than 100 W when in sunlight. A fully built version of the probe was successfully tested in Greenland in 2006, drilling to a depth of 50 m. NASA has proposed a similar design for drilling in the ice on Europa, a moon of Jupiter. Any such probe would have to survive temperatures of 500 °C while being sterilized to avoid biological contamination of the target environment.

== Other drill types ==
=== Snow samplers ===
Snow samples are taken to measure the depth and density of the snow pack in a given area. Measurements of depth and density can be converted into a snow water equivalent (SWE) number, which is the depth of water that would result from converting the snow into water. Snow samplers are typically hollow cylinders, with toothed ends to help them penetrate the snow pack; they are used by pushing them into the snow, and then pulling them out along with the snow in the cylinder. Weighing the cylinder full of snow and subtracting the weight of the empty cylinder gives the snow weight; samplers usually have lengthwise slots to allow the depth of the snow to be recorded as well, though a sampler made of transparent material makes this unnecessary.

The sampler must grip the snow well enough to keep the snow inside the cylinder as it is removed from the snow, which is easier to accomplish with a smaller diameter cylinder; however, larger diameters give more accurate readings. Samples must avoid compacting the snow, so they have smooth inner surfaces (usually of anodized aluminium alloy, and sometimes waxed in addition) to prevent the snow from gripping the sides of the cylinder as it is pushed in. A sampler may penetrate light snow under its own weight; denser snow pack, firn, or ice, may require the user to rotate the sampler gently so that the cutting teeth are engaged. Pushing too hard without successfully cutting a dense layer may cause the sample to push the layer down; this situation can be identified because the snow level inside the sampler will be lower than the surrounding snow. Multiple readings are usually taken at each location of interest, and the results are averaged. Snow samplers are usually accurate to within about 5–10%.

The first snow sampler was developed by J.E. Church in the winter of 1908/1909, and the most common modern snow sampler, known as the Federal snow sampler, is based on Church's design, with some modifications by George D. Clyde and the U.S. Soil Conservation Service in the 1930s. It can be used for sampling snow up to 9 m in depth.

=== Penetration testers ===
Penetration testing involves inserting a probe into snow to determine the snow's mechanical properties. Experienced snow surveyors can use an ordinary ski pole to test snow hardness by pushing it into the snow; the results are recorded based on the change in resistance felt as the pole is inserted. A more scientific tool, invented in the 1930s but still in widespread use, is a ram penetrometer. This takes the form of a rod with a cone at the lower end. The upper end of the rod passes through a weight that is used as a hammer; the weight is lifted and released, and hits an anvil—a ledge around the rod which it cannot pass—which drives the rod into the snow. To take a measurement, the rod is placed on the snow and the hammer is dropped one or more times; the resulting depth of penetration is recorded. In soft snow a lighter hammer can be used to obtain more precise results; hammer weights range from 2 kg down to 0.1 kg. Even with lighter hammers, ram penetrometers have difficulty distinguishing thin layers of snow, which limits their usefulness with regard to avalanche studies, since thin and soft layers are often involved in avalanche formation.

Two lightweight tools are in wide use that are more sensitive than ram penetrometers. A snow micro-penetrometer uses a motor to drive a rod into snow, measuring the force required; it is sensitive to 0.01–0.05 newtons, depending on the snow strength. A SABRE probe consists of a rod that is inserted manually into snow; accelerometer readings are then used to determine the penetrative force needed at each depth, and stored electronically.

For testing dense polar snow, a cone penetrometer test (CPT) is use, based on the equivalent devices used for soil testing. CPT measurements can be used in hard snow and firn to depths of 5–10 m.

=== Rotary auger rigs ===
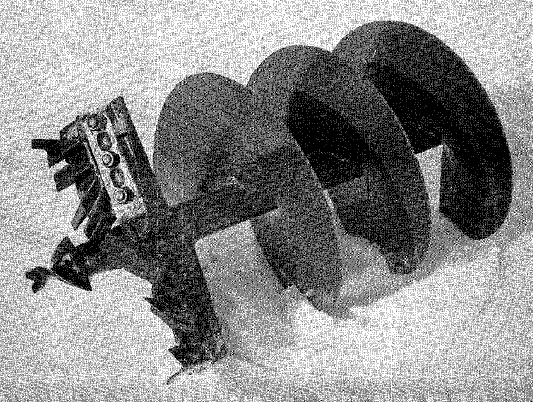
24-inch auger used by the US Navy in testing polar construction equipment in 1967

Commercially available rotary rigs have been used with large augers to drill in ice, generally for construction or for holes to gain access below the ice. Although they are unable to produce cores, they have been intermittently used by US and Soviet scientific expeditions in the Antarctic. In 2012, a British Antarctic Survey expedition to drill down to Lake Ellsworth, two miles below the surface of the Antarctic ice, used an Australian earth auger driven by a truck-mounted top drive to help drill two 300 m holes as part of the project, though in the event the project was delayed.

Powered augers designed to drill large holes through ice for winter fishing may be mounted on a snow vehicle, or a tractor or sled; hole diameters can be as high as 350 mm. These rigs have been produced commercially in both the US and the USSR, but are no longer in common use.

=== Flame-jet drills ===
A flame-jet drill, more usually used to drill through crystalline rocks, was used to drill through ice on the Ross Ice Shelf, in the 1970s. The drill burns fuel oil, and can be run under water as long as enough compressed air is available. It drills rapidly, but produces an irregular hole contaminated by soot and fuel oil.

=== Vibratory drills ===
A Soviet-designed drill used a motor to provide vertical vibration to the barrel of the drill at 50 Hz; the drill had an outer diameter of 0.4 m, and in tests at Vostok Station in the Antarctic drilled a 6.5 m hole, with a 1.2 m drilling run taking between 1 and 5 minutes to complete. The drill's steel edges compacted snow into the core, which helped it stick to the inside of the barrel when the drill was winched out of the hole.

== Drilling system components ==
=== Cutters ===
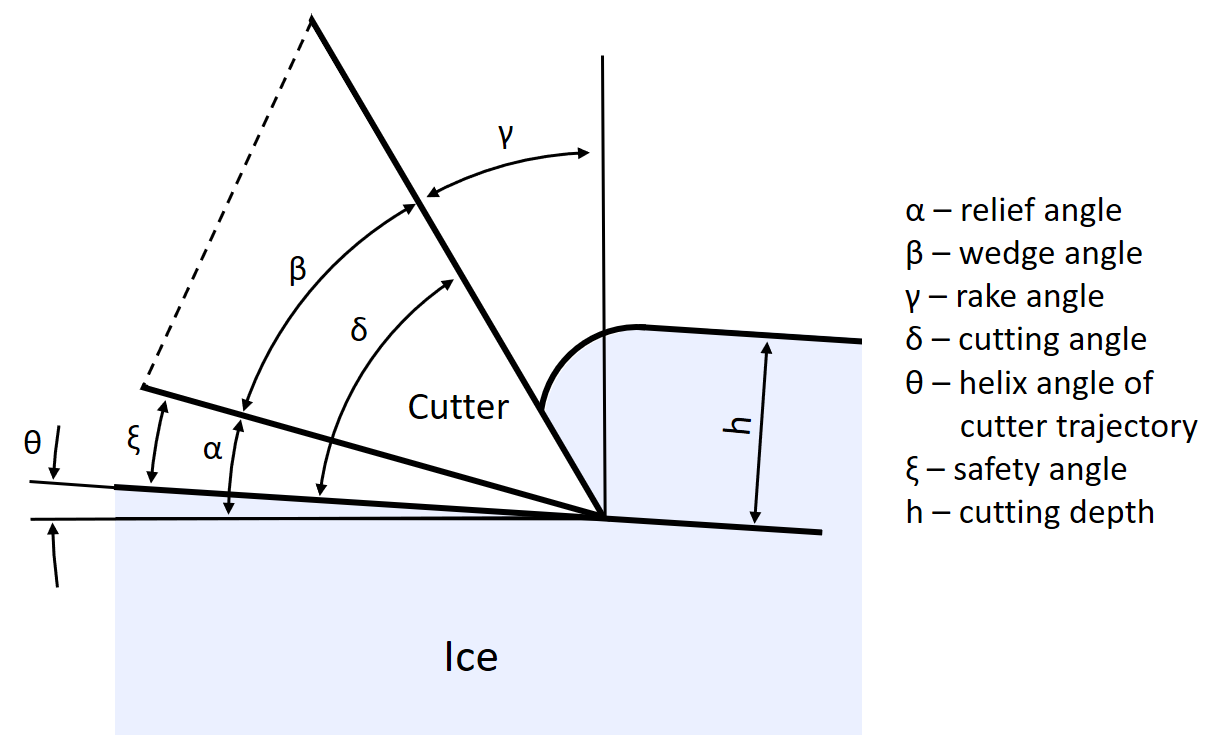
Geometric parameters for cutters

Mechanical drills typically have three cutters, spaced evenly around the drill head. Two cutters leads to vibration and poorer ice core quality, and tests of drillheads with four cutters have produced unsatisfactory performance. Geometric design varies, but the relief angle, α, varies from 5–15°, with 8–10° the most common range in cold ice, and the cutting angle, δ, varies from 45° (the most common in cold ice) up to 90°. The safety angle, between the underside of the cutting blade and the ice, can be as low as 0.8° in successful drill designs. Different shapes for the end of the blade have been tried: flat (the most common design), pointed, rounded, and scoop shaped.

Cutters have to be made of extremely strong materials, and usually have to be sharpened after every 10–20 m of drilling. Tool steels containing carbon are not ideal because the carbon makes the steel brittle in temperatures below −20 °C. Sintered tungsten carbide has been suggested for use in cutters, since it is extremely hard, but the best tool steels are more cost effective: carbide cutters are fixed to the body of the cutting tool by cold pressing or brass soldering, and cannot easily be unmounted and sharpened in the field.

The cutting depth is controlled by mounting shoes on the bottom of the drill head; these ride on the ice surface and so limit how deep the cutter can penetrate in each revolution of the drill. They are most commonly mounted just behind the cutters, but this position can lead to ice accumulating in the gap between the cutter and the shoe. So far it has not proved possible to correct this by modifying the shoe design.

=== Drilling fluids ===
Drilling fluids are necessary for borehole stability in deep cores, and can also be used to circulate cuttings away from the bit. Fluids used include water, ethanol/water and water/ethylene glycol mixtures, petroleum fuels, non-aromatic hydrocarbons, and n-butyl acetate.

- Water is the cheapest and cleanest option; it may be present on the glacial surface or may be created by thermal drilling. In cold ice some form of antifreeze is necessary, or heat must be reapplied by reaming the hole periodically.
- Ethanol and water. Ethanol acts as an anti-freeze in water; at sufficient concentrations it can reduce the freezing temperature of the mixture to well below any temperature likely to be encountered in ice drilling. The concentration must be chosen to prevent the liquid freezing and also to maintain the borehole against the ice overburden pressure. Because the density of the mixture decreases with lower temperatures, vertical convection will develop in boreholes where temperatures decrease with depth, as the lighter mixture rises. This causes slush to form in the borehole, though successful drilling is still possible. Ethanol is one of the cheapest options for a drilling fluid, and requires less storage space than other options because in use it is diluted with water. A Soviet expedition left an 800 m borehole in Antarctica filled with ethanol and water at an ice temperature of −53 °C; after 11 months the borehole remained open and drilling was resumed with no problems. A problem with this option is that the mixture will penetrate cores that have cracks.
- Ethylene glycol and water was used at Camp Century in 1966 in the lower part of the hole to dissolve the cuttings.
- Petroleum fuels. This includes diesel, jet fuel, and kerosene. They are inexpensive and easily available, and were once in common use; disadvantages include flammability and the aromatics they contain, which are a health hazard.
- Non-aromatic hydrocarbons. As of 2009 these had become the most commonly used drilling fluids; eliminating the aromatics resolved the health issues with these fluids. They are significantly more expensive than untreated petroleum fuels.
- n-Butyl acetate. A widely used fuel in the 1990s, because it is a close match for the density of ice, this is now unpopular because it dissolves many materials, which prevents their use in the drilling equipment it comes in contact with. It is also flammable and corrosive, and protective clothing and in some cases masks may be necessary for people exposed to it.
- ESTISOL-based fluids. ESTISOL is an ester, like n-butyl acetate, but it has no health concerns.

Densifiers are used in drilling fluids to adjust the density of the fluid to match the surrounding ice. Perchloroethylene and trichloroethylene were often used in early drilling programs, in combination with petroleum fuels. These have been phased out for health reasons. Freon was a temporary replacement, but has been banned by the Montreal Protocol, as has HCFC-141b, a hydrochlorofluorocarbon densifier used once Freon was abandoned. Future options for drilling fluids include low molecular weight esters, such as ethyl butyrate, n-propyl propionate, n-butyl butyrate, n-amyl butyrate and hexyl acetate; mixtures of various kinds of ESTISOL; and dimethyl siloxane oils.

=== Anti-torque ===
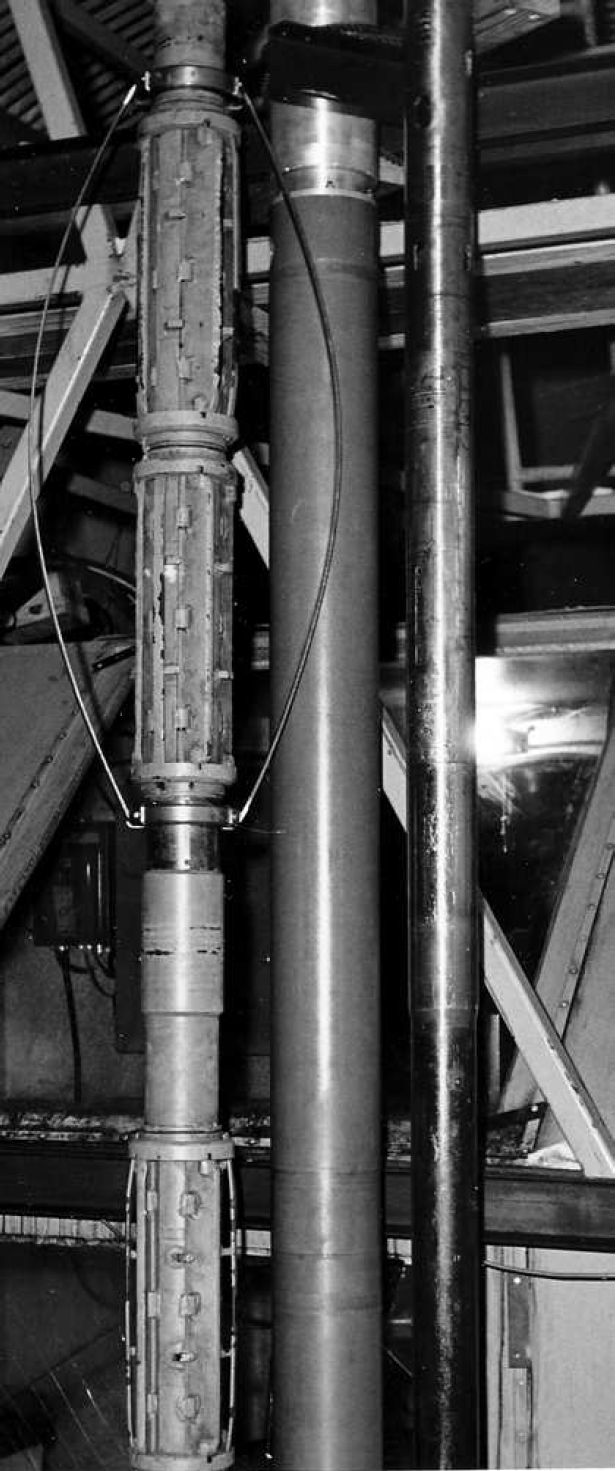
Leaf springs and hinged friction blades on CRREL drill used to drill at Byrd Station in Antarctica from 1966 to 1968

The two main requirements of an anti-torque system are that it should prevent rotation of the sonde, and it should allow easy movement of the drill up and down the borehole. Attempts have been made to design drills with counter-rotating components so that overall torque is minimized, but these have had limited success. Five kinds of anti-torque systems have been devised for use with cable-suspended EM drills, though not all are in current use, and some drills have used a combination of more than one design. The first drill to require an anti-torque system was used at Camp Century by CRREL in 1966; the drill incorporated a set of hinged friction blades that swung out from the sonde when the drill motor was started. These were found to have very weak friction against the borehole wall, and were ineffective; the drill had to be controlled carefully to prevent twisting the cable. No other drills have attempted to use this approach.

For the next deployment of the drill leaf springs were installed, and this has proved to be a more durable design. These are mounted vertically, with a curve outwards so that they are easily compressed by the borehole wall, and can slide up and down with the movement of the drill. They pass easily through any areas of irregularity in the borehole, but the edges of the springs cut into the borehole wall and prevent rotation. Leaf springs are very simple mechanically, with the additional benefit of being easy to adjust by changing the spacing between the end points. They can be placed anywhere on the drill that does not rotate, so they do not add length to the sonde. The shape is usually a fourth-order parabola, since this has been determined to provide the most even loading against the borehole wall. Leaf springs have been found to be so effective that they can prevent rotation even in heavy drills running at full power.

Skate antitorque systems have blades attached to vertical bars which are pushed against the borehole wall; the blades dig into the wall and provide the anti-torque. Skates can be built with springs which allow them to keep the blades pressed against the wall in an irregular borehole, and to prevent problems in narrower parts of the borehole. Although skates are a popular design for anti-torque and have been used with success, they have difficulty preventing rotation in firn and at boundaries between layers of different densities, and can cause problems when drilling with high torque. When they fail, they act as reamers, removing chips from the wall which can fall to the drillbit and interfere with drilling.

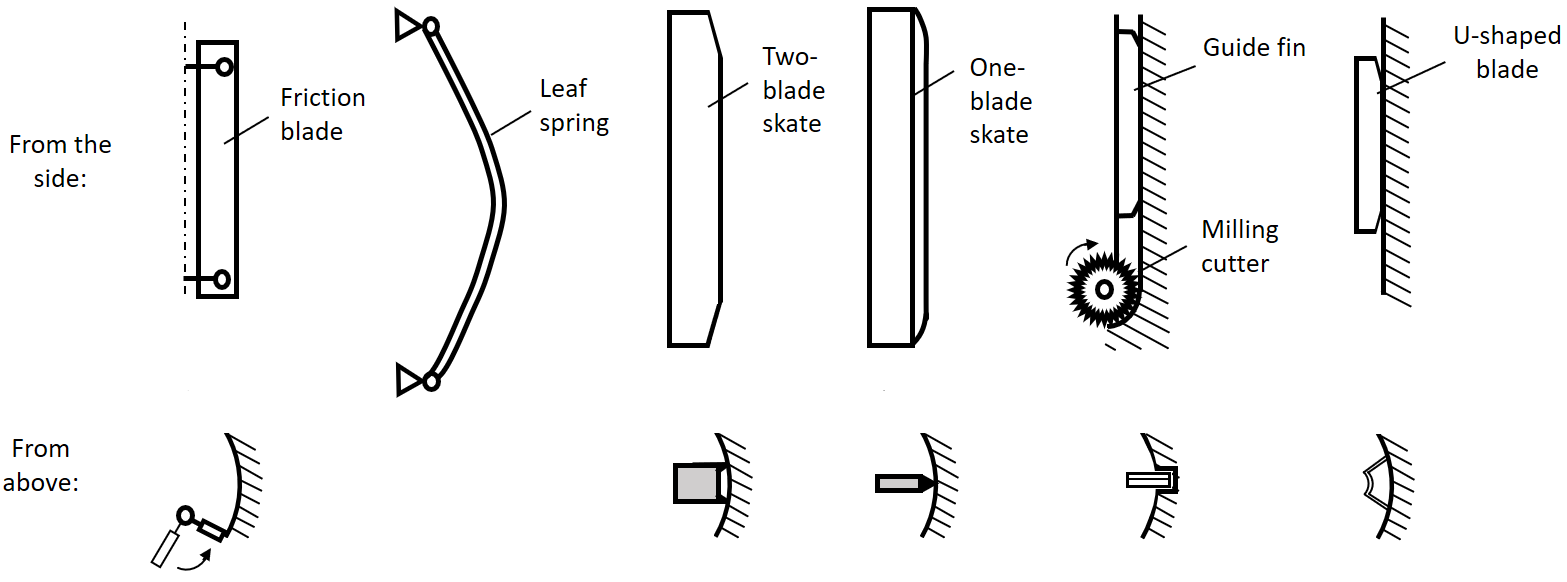
Five different anti-torque devices

In the 1970s, the Japanese Antarctic Research Expedition (JARE) group designed several drills using side-mill cutters. These are toothed gears that are driven from the rotation of the main drill motor via 45° spiral gears; their axis of rotation is horizontal, and they are placed so that the teeth cut four vertical slots in the borehole wall. Guide fins higher on the sonde travel in these slots and provide the antitorque. The design was effective at preventing rotation of the sonde, but it proved to be almost impossible to realign the guide fins with the existing slots when tripping in. Misalignment increased the chance of the drill getting stuck in the borehole; and there was also a risk of ice cuttings from the mill cutters jamming in between the drill and the borehole wall, causing the drill to get stuck. The system was used again in a drill developed in China in the 1980s and 1990s, but the problems inherent in the design are now considered insuperable and it is no longer in use.

The most recent anti-torque system design is the use of U-shaped blades, made of steel and fixed vertically to the sides of the sonde. Initial implementations ran into problems with thin blades bending too easily, and thick blades providing too much resistance to vertical movement of the sonde, but the final design can generate strong resistance to torque in both firn and ice.

Drills may be designed with more than one anti-torque system in order to take advantage of the different performance of the different designs in different kinds of snow and ice. For example, a drill may have skates to be used in hard firn or ice, but also have a leaf-spring system, which will be more effective in soft firn.

=== Breaking and retaining cores ===
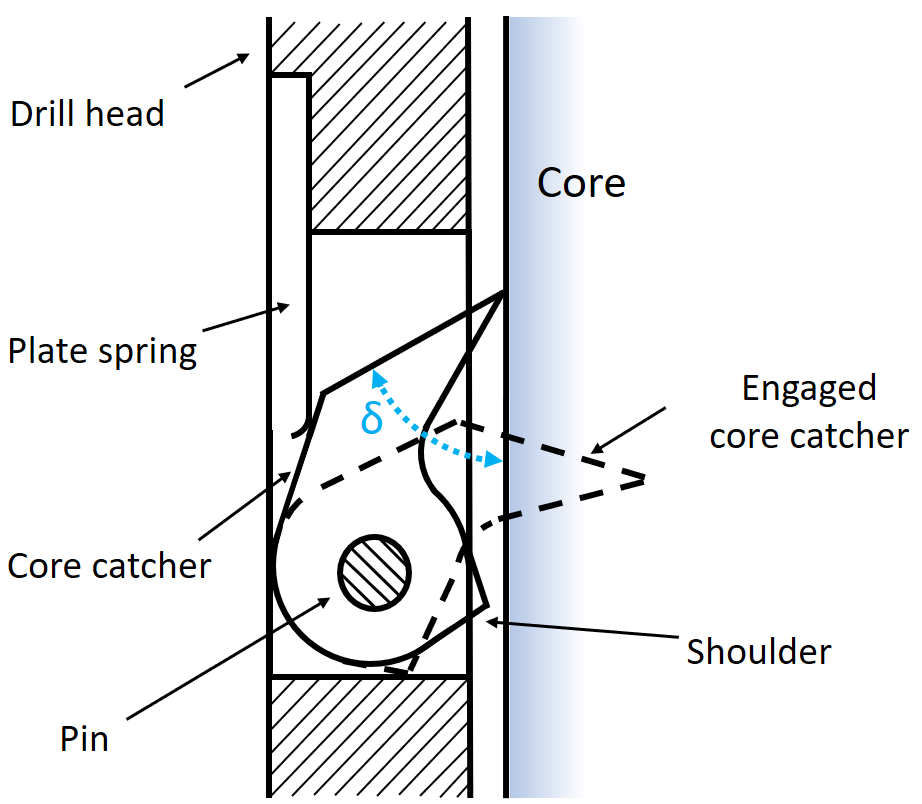
Core dog in unengaged and engaged position

In ice core drilling, when an annulus has been drilled around the core to be retrieved, the core is still attached to the ice sheet at its lower end, and this connection has to be broken before the core can be retrieved. One option is to use a collet, which is a tapered ring inside the cutting head. When the drill is pulled up, the collet compresses the core and holds it, with loose ice chips wedged in it increasing the compression. This breaks the core and holds it in the barrel once it has broken. Collets are effective in firn but less so in ice, so core dogs, also known as core catchers, are often used for ice cores.

A typical ice drill core dog has a dog-leg shape, and will be built into the drill head with the ability to rotate, and with a spring supplying some pressure against the core. When the drill is lifted, the sharp point of the core dog engages and rotates around, causing the core to break. Some core dogs have a shoulder to stop them from over-rotating. Most drill heads have three core dogs, though having only two core dogs is possible; the asymmetric shearing force helps break the core. The angle, δ, between the core dog point and the core, has been the subject of some investigation; a study in 1984 concluded that the optimum angle was 55°, and a later study concluded that the angle should be closer to 80°. Core catchers are made from hardened steel, and need to be as sharp as possible. The force required to break the core varies with temperature and depth, and in warm ice the core dogs may gouge grooves up the core before they catch and it breaks. Some drills may also include a weight that can be used as a hammer, to provide an impact to help in breaking the core.

For snow and firn, where the core material may be at risk of falling out of the bottom of the core barrel, a basket catcher is a better choice. These catchers consist of spring wires or thin pieces of sheet metal, placed radially around the bottom of the core barrel and pressed against the side of the barrel by the core as the drill descends around it. When the drill is lifted, the ends of the catcher engage with the core and break it from the base, and act as a basket to hold it in place while it is brought to the surface.

=== Casing ===
Casing, or lining a hole with a tube, is necessary whenever drilling operations require that the borehole be isolated from the surrounding permeable snow and firn. Uncased holes can be drilled with fluid by using a hose lowered into the hole, but this is likely to lead to increased drilling fluid consumption and environmental contamination from leaks. Steel casing was used in the 1970s, but rust from the casing caused damage to the drills, and the casing was not sealed, leading to fluid leaks. There were also problems with the casing tubes not being centered, which caused damage to the drill bit as it was lowered through the casing. Fibreglass and HDPE casing has become more common, with junctions sealed with PTFE tape, but leaks are frequent. Heat fusion welding for HDPE casing is a possible solution. To seal the bottom of the casing, water can be pumped to the bottom of the hole once the casing is set, or a thermal head can be used to melt ice around the casing shoe, creating a seal when the water freezes again. Another approach is to use a hotpoint drill, saturating the snow and firn with melted water, which will then freeze and seal the borehole.

Low-temperature PVC tubing is not suitable for permanent casing, since it cannot be sealed at the bottom, but it can be used to pass drilling fluid through the permeable zone. Its advantage is that it requires no connections since it can be coiled on a reel for deployment.

== See also ==
- History of ice drilling

== Sources ==
- Aamot, Haldor W.C. (July 1967). Pendulum Steering for Thermal Probes in Glaciers (Report). Hanover, New Hampshire: Cold Regions Research and Engineering Laboratory.
- Aamot, Haldor W.C. (1968). "Instruments and methods: instrumented probes for deep glacial investigations" (PDF). Journal of Glaciology. 7 (50): 321–328. doi:10.3189/s0022143000031087.
- Alley, Richard B. (2000). The Two-Mile Time Machine. Princeton, New Jersey: Princeton University Press. ISBN 0-691-10296-1.
- Anonymous (30 June 2017). Long Range Drilling Technology Plan (Report). Madison, Wisconsin: Ice Drilling Design and Operations.
- Barry, Roger; Gan, Thian Yew (2011). The Global Cryosphere: Past, Present and Future. Cambridge: Cambridge University Press. ISBN 978-0-521-76981-5.
- Benson, T.; Cherwinka, J.; Duvernois, M.; Elcheikh, A.; Feyzi, F.; Greenler, L.; Haugen, J.; Karle, A.; Mulligan, M.; Paulos, R. (2014). "IceCube Enhanced Hot Water Drill functional description" (PDF). Annals of Glaciology. 55 (68): 105–114. Bibcode:2014AnGla..55..105B. doi:10.3189/2014AoG68A032. S2CID 129980432. Archived from the original (PDF) on 1 December 2017.
- Bentley, Charles R.; Koci, Bruce R.; Augustin, Laurent J.-M.; Bolsey, Robin J.; Green, James A.; Kyne, Jay D.; Lebar, Donald A.; Mason, William P.; Shturmakov, Alexander J.; Engelhardt, Hermann F.; Harrison, William D.; Hecht, Michael H.; Zagorodnov, Victor (2009). "Ice Drilling and Coring". In Bar-Cohen, Kris; Zacny, Kris (eds.). Drilling in Extreme Environments. Weinheim, Germany: Wiley-VCH. ISBN 978-3-527-40852-8.
- Bird, Ian G. (1976). "Thermal ice drilling: Australian developments and experience". In Splettstoesser, John F. (ed.). Ice-Core Drilling. Lincoln, Nebraska: University of Nebraska Press. pp. 1–18. ISBN 0-8032-5843-7.
- Blake, Erik W.; Wake, Cameron P.; Gerasimoff, Michael D. (1998). "The ECLIPSE drill: a field-portable intermediate-depth ice-coring drill" (PDF). Journal of Glaciology. 44 (146): 175–178. Bibcode:1998JGlac..44..175B. doi:10.3189/S0022143000002471.
- Blümcke, Adolf; Hess, Hans (1899). Untersuchungen Am Hintereisferner (in German). Munich: Deutschen und Österreichischen Alpenvereins.
- Blümcke, Adolf; Hess, Hans (1910). "Tiefbohrungen am Hintereisgletscher 1909". In Brückner, Eduard (ed.). Zeitschrift für Gletscherkunde, für Eiszeitforschung und Geschichte des Klimas (in German). Vol. IV. Grenoble, France: Gebrüder Borntraeger. pp. 66–70.
- Bradley, Raymond S. (2015). Paleoclimatology: Reconstructing Climates of the Quaternary. Amsterdam: Academic Press. ISBN 978-0-12-386913-5.
- Cao, Pinlu; Chen, Baoyi; Liu, Chunpeng; Talalay, Pavel; Yang, Cheng (2015). "Experimental investigation of cutting temperature in ice drilling". Cold Regions Science and Technology. 116 (116): 78–85. Bibcode:2015CRST..116...78C. doi:10.1016/j.coldregions.2015.04.008.\
- Cardell, G.; Hecht, M.H.; Carsey, F.D.; Engelhardt, H.; Fisher, D.; Terrell, C.; Thompson, J. (2004). The subsurface ice probe (SIPR): a low-power thermal probe for the Martian polar layered deposits (PDF). Lunar and Planetary Science XXXV (Report). Lunar and Planetary Institute.
- Clarke, Garry K.C. (1987). "A short history of scientific investigations on glaciers". Journal of Glaciology. Special issue (S1): 4–24. Bibcode:1987JGlac..33S...4C. doi:10.3189/s0022143000215785.
- Desor, Pierre (1845) [1844]. Nouvelles excursions et séjours dans les glaciers et les hautes régions des Alpes, de M. Agassiz et de ses compagnons de voyage (in French). Paris: L. Maison.
- Gerrard, J.A.F.; et al. (22 July 1952). "Measurement of the velocity distribution along a vertical line through a glacier". Proceedings of the Royal Society of London. 213 (1115): 546–558. Bibcode:1952RSPSA.213..546G. doi:10.1098/rspa.1952.0144. JSTOR 72546791. S2CID 129112214.
- Gillet, F. (1975). "Instruments and methods: steam, hot-water and electrical thermal drills for temperate glaciers" (PDF). Journal of Glaciology. 14 (70): 171–179. doi:10.3189/s0022143000013484.
- Goetz, J.J.; Shturmakov, A.J. (2013). "Design of a new IDDO hand auger". 7th International Workshop on Ice Drilling Technology. Madison, Wisconsin: University of Wisconsin. p. 66.
- Hansen, B. Lyle (1994). "Deep core drilling in ice". Memoirs of National Institute of Polar Research. 49 (Special): 5–8.
- Hay, William W. (2015). Experimenting on a Small Planet. Berlin: Springer. ISBN 978-3-319-27402-7.
- Howorka, F. (1965). "Instruments and methods: a steam-operated drill for the installation of ablation stakes on glaciers" (PDF). Journal of Glaciology. 5 (41): 749–750. doi:10.3189/s002214300001875x.
- Hubbard, Bryn; Glasser, Neil (2005). Field Techniques in Glaciology and Glacial Geomorphology. Chichester, UK: Wiley. ISBN 978-0-470-84427-4.
- Iken, A.; Röthlisberger, H.; Hutter, K. (1976). "Deep drilling with a hot water jet". Zeitschrift für Gletscherkunde und Glazialgeologie. 12 (2): 143–156.
- Kasser, P. (1960). "Ein leichter thermischer Eisbohrer als Hilfsgerät zur Installation von Ablationsstangen auf Gletschern". Pure and Applied Geophysics (in German). 45 (1): 97–114. Bibcode:1960GeoPA..45...97K. doi:10.1007/bf01996577. S2CID 129372044.
- Knight, Peter (1999). Glaciers. Cheltenham, UK: Stanley Thornes. ISBN 0-7487-4000-7.
- Koci, Bruce R. (2002). "A review of high-altitude drilling". Memoirs of National Institute of Polar Research. 56 (Special): 1–4.
- Koechlin, René: Patent CH240634 (A) – Procédé pour sonder les glaciers et installation pour sa mise en oeuvre. European Patent Office, 1 May 1946
- Kyne, Jay; McConnell, Joe (2007). "The PrairieDog: a double-barrel coring drill for 'hand' augering". Annals of Glaciology. 47 (1): 99–100. Bibcode:2007AnGla..47...99K. doi:10.3189/172756407786857703.
- Langway, C.C. (May 1967). Stratigraphic analysis of a deep ice core from Greenland (Report). Hanover, New Hampshire: Cold Regions Research and Engineering Laboratory.
- Linell, Kenneth (1954). "Ice drilling and coring equipment". Proceedings of the Eastern Snow Conference. 2: 4–6.
- Mellor, Malcolm; Sellmann, Paul V. (1976). "General considerations for drill system design". In Splettstoesser, John F. (ed.). Ice-Core Drilling. Lincoln, Nebraska: University of Nebraska Press. pp. 77–111. ISBN 0-8032-5843-7.
- Mercanton, P.-L. (1905). "Forages glaciaires". Archives des Sciences Physiques et Naturelles (in French). 19: 367–379, 451–471.
- Morev, V.A.; Zagorodnov, V.S. (1992). Drilling large diameter boreholes in snow and firn (Report). Fairbanks, Alaska: Polar Ice Coring Office.
- National Research Council of the National Academies (2007). Exploration of Antarctic Subglacial Aquatic Environments: Environmental and Scientific Stewardship. Washington DC: National Academies Press. ISBN 978-0-309-10635-1.
- Nizery, A. (February 1951). "Electrothermic rig for the boring of glaciers". Transactions, American Geophysical Union. 32 (1): 66–72. Bibcode:1951TrAGU..32...66N. doi:10.1029/TR032i001p00066.
- Paterson, W.S.B. (1981). The Physics of Glaciers (2nd ed.). Oxford: Pergamon Press. ISBN 0-08-024004-6.
- Philberth, K. (October 1972). Stabilizing the Course of a Thermal Probe (Report). Hanover, New Hampshire: Cold Regions Research and Engineering Laboratory. Original publication as Philberth, K. (February 1966). "Sur la stabilisation de la course d'une sonde thermique". Comptes rendus de l'Académie des sciences (in French). 262 (6): 456–459. Translated by U.S. Joint Publications Research Service.
- Philberth, Karl (1976). "The thermal probe deep-drilling method by EGIG in 1968 at Station Jarl-Joset, central Greenland". In Splettstoesser, John F. (ed.). Ice-Core Drilling. Lincoln, Nebraska: University of Nebraska Press. pp. 117–132. ISBN 0-8032-5843-7.
- Ract-Madoux, M.; Reynaud, L. (1951). "L'exploration des glaciers en profondeur" (PDF). La Houille Blanche (in French). 37 (Special): 299–308. Bibcode:1951LHBl...37S.299R. doi:10.1051/lhb/1951009.
- Rado, Claude; Girard, Claude; Perrin, Jacky (1987). "Instruments and methods: a self-flushing hot-water drilling apparatus for glaciers with debris" (PDF). Journal of Glaciology. 33 (114): 236–238. doi:10.3189/s0022143000008741.
- Reeh, N. (1984). "Antitorque leaf springs: a design guide for ice-drill antitorque leaf springs". In Holdsworth, G.; Kuivinen, K.C.; Rand, J.H. (eds.). Ice Drilling Technology. Hanover, New Hampshire: Cold Regions Research and Engineering Laboratory. pp. 69–72.
- Remenieras, G.; Terrier, M. (1951). "La sonde électrothermique E.D.F. pour le forage des glaciers" (PDF). Assemblée Générales de Bruxelles: Tome I (in French). Brussels: L'Association Internationale D'Hydrologie Scientifique. pp. 254–260. Archived from the original (PDF) on 10 February 2018.
- Renaud, A.; Mercanton, P.L. (1948) Les Sondages Sismiques de la Commission Helvétique des Glaciers. Publications du Bureau Central Seismologique International, Travaux Scientifique, Serie A. Fascicule 17, Communications presentées à la conférence de Union Geodesique et Geophysique International d'Oslo, August 1948.
- Reynaud, L.; Courdouan, P. (1962). "Reconnaissance du thalweg sous-glaciaire de la Mer de Glace en vue de l'etablissement d'une prise d'eau" (PDF). La Houille Blanche. 48 (Special): 808–816. Bibcode:1962LHBl...48S.808R. doi:10.1051/lhb/1962014.
- Sharp, Robert P. (1951). "Thermal regimen of firn on Upper Seward Glacier, Yukon Territory, Canada". Journal of Glaciology. 1 (9): 476–487. Bibcode:1951JGlac...1..476S. doi:10.1017/S0022143000026460.
- Sharp, Robert P. (1953). "Deformation of a vertical bore hole in a Piedmont glacier" (PDF). Journal of Glaciology. 2 (13): 182–184. Bibcode:1953JGlac...2..182S. doi:10.1017/S0022143000025685.
- Sheldon, Simon G.; et al. (2014). "Promising new borehole liquids for ice-core drilling on the East Antarctic high plateau" (PDF). Annals of Glaciology. 55 (68): 260–270. Bibcode:2014AnGla..55..260S. doi:10.3189/2014AoG68A043. S2CID 130184013. Archived from the original (PDF) on 4 September 2017.
- Shreve, R.L. (1962). "Theory of performance of isothermal solid-nose hotpoints boring in temperate ice" (PDF). Journal of Glaciology. 4 (32): 151–160. Bibcode:1962JGlac...4..151S. doi:10.1017/S0022143000027362.
- Siegert, Martin J.; Makinson, Keith; Blake, David; Mowlem, Matt; Ross, Neil (2014). "An assessment of deep hot-water drilling as a means to undertake direct measurement and sampling of Antarctic subglacial lakes: experience and lessons learned from the Lake Ellsworth field season 2012/13" (PDF). Annals of Glaciology. 55 (65): 59–73. Bibcode:2014AnGla..55...59S. doi:10.3189/2014AoG65A008. S2CID 131514388. Archived from the original (PDF) on 1 December 2017.
- Souney, Joseph M.; Twickler, Mark S.; Hargreaves, Geoffrey M.; Bencivengo, Brian M.; Kippenhan, Matthew J.; Johnson, Jay A.; Cravens, Eric D.; Neff, Peter D.; Nunn, Richard M.; Orsi, Anais J.; Popp, Trevor J.; Rhoades, John F.; Vaughn, Bruce H.; Voigt, Donald E.; Wong, Gifford J.; Taylor, Kendrick C. (31 December 2014). "Core handling and processing for the WAIS Divide ice-core project". Annals of Glaciology. 55 (68): 15–26. Bibcode:2014AnGla..55...15S. doi:10.3189/2014AoG68A008.
- Süsstrunk, A. (1951). "Sondage du Glacier par la méthode sismique" (PDF). La Houille Blanche. 37 (Special): 309–318. Bibcode:1951LHBl...37S.309S. doi:10.1051/lhb/1951010.
- Talalay, Pavel G. (April 2012). Drill heads of the deep ice electromechanical drills (Report). Jilin University, China: Polar Research Center.
- Talalay, Pavel G. (2014). "Perspectives for development of ice-core drilling technology: a discussion" (PDF). Annals of Glaciology. 55 (68): 339–350. Bibcode:2014AnGla..55..339T. doi:10.3189/2014AoG68A007. S2CID 131606358. Archived from the original (PDF) on 1 December 2017.
- Talalay, Pavel G. (2016). Mechanical Ice Drilling Technology. Springer (Singapore) and Geological Publishing House (Beijing)). ISBN 978-981-10-0559-6.
- Talalay, Pavel G.; Fan, Xiaopeng; Zheng, Zhichuan; Xue, Jun; Cao, Pinlu; Zhang, Nan; Wang, Rusheng; Yu, Dahui; Yu, Chengfeng; Zhang, Yunlong; Zhang, Qi; Su, Kai; Zhan, Dongdong; Zhan, Jiewei (2014). "Anti-torque systems of electromechanical cable-suspended drills and test results". Annals of Glaciology. 55 (68): 207–218. Bibcode:2014AnGla..55..207T. doi:10.3189/2014AoG68A025.
- Uchida, Tsutomu; Duval, P.; Lipenkov, V.Ya.; Hondoh, T.; Mae, S.; Shoji, H. (1994). "Brittle zone and air-hydrate formation in polar ice sheets". Memoirs of National Institute of Polar Research. 49: 298–305.
- Ueda, Herb (23 October 2002). "Interview of Herb Ueda". The Ohio State University - University Libraries (Interview). Interviewed by Shoemaker, Brian. hdl:1811/44677.
- Ueda, Herbert T. (2002). "Some thoughts on deep core drilling systems design". Memoirs of National Institute of Polar Research. 56 (Special): 126–135.
- Vallot, J. (1898). "Exploration des moulins de la mer de glace: Forage de M. Émile Vallot". In Steinheil, G. (ed.). Annales de l'Observatoire météorologique physique et glaciaire du Mont-Blanc (in French). Vol. 3. Paris. pp. 190–193.
- von Drygalski, Erich (1904). Deutsche Südpolar-Expedition (in German). Berlin: Georg Reimer.
- Ward, W.H. (1961). "Experiences with electro-thermal ice drills on Austerdalsbre 1956–59" (PDF). Assemblée Générales de Helsinki: Commission des Neiges et Glaces. Gentbrugge, Belgium: L'Association Internationale D'Hydrologie Scientifique. pp. 532–542. Archived from the original (PDF) on 21 October 2017.
- Wehrle, E. (1985). "A shallow core-collecting mechanical ice drill". In Jacka, T.H. (ed.). ANARE Research Notes 28. Kingston, Tasmania: Australian National Antarctic Research Expeditions. pp. 196–201.
- Zagorodnov, V.; Kelley, J.J.; Koci, B.; Stanford, K.L.; Collins, J. (May 1992). Directional drilling (Report). Fairbanks, Alaska: Polar Ice Coring Office.
- Zagorodnov, V.; Thompson, L.G. (2014). "Thermal electric ice-core drills: history and new design options for intermediate-depth drilling". Annals of Glaciology. 55 (68): 322–330. Bibcode:2014AnGla..55..322Z. doi:10.3189/2014AoG68A012.
- Zagorodnov, V.; Thompson, L.G.; Kelley, J.J.; Koci, B.; Mikhalenko, V. (1998). "Antifreeze thermal ice core drilling: an effective approach to the acquisition of ice cores". Cold Regions Science and Technology. 116 (28): 189–202. Bibcode:1998CRST...28..189Z. doi:10.1016/s0165-232x(98)00019-6.
