= Spindle (vehicle) =

Ice penetrating two-stage autonomous underwater vehicle

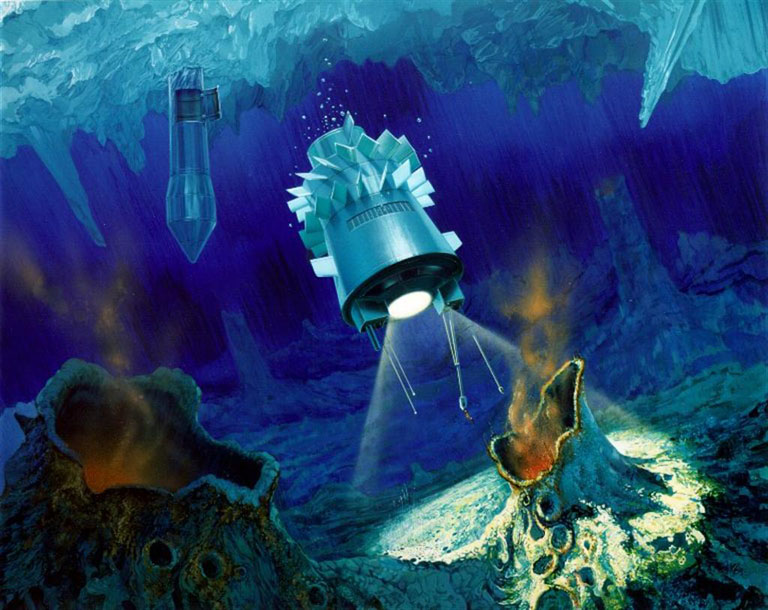
Artist's impression of a cryobot deploying a robotic submersible

SPINDLE (Sub-glacial Polar Ice Navigation, Descent, and Lake Exploration) is a 2-stage autonomous vehicle system consisting of a robotic ice-penetrating carrier vehicle (cryobot) and an autonomous submersible HAUV (hovering autonomous underwater vehicle). The cryobot is designed to descend through an ice body into a sub-surface ocean and deploy the HAUV submersible to conduct long range reconnaissance, life search, and sample collection. The HAUV submersible will return to, and auto-dock with, the cryobot at the conclusion of the mission for subsequent data uplink and sample return to the surface.

The SPINDLE designed is targeted at sub-glacial lakes such as Lake Vostok and South Pole Lake in Antarctica. SPINDLE would develop the technologies for a Flagship-class mission to either the shallow lakes of Jupiter's moon Europa, the sub-surface ocean of Ganymede, or the geyser sources on both Europa and Enceladus. The project is funded by NASA and is being designed at Stone Aerospace under the supervision of Principal Investigator Bill Stone.

== Development ==
In 2011, NASA awarded Stone Aerospace $4 million to fund Phase 2 of project VALKYRIE (Very-Deep Autonomous Laser-Powered Kilowatt-Class Yo-Yoing Robotic Ice Explorer). This project created an autonomous cryobot capable of melting through vast amounts of ice. The 5 kW (6.7 hp) power source on the surface uses optic fiber to conduct a high-energy laser beam to produce hot water jets that melt the ice ahead. Some beam energy is converted to electricity via photovoltaic cells to power on-board electronics and jet pumps. Phase 2 of project VALKYRIE consisted of testing a scaled-down version of the cryobot in Matanuska Glacier, Alaska in 2015.

Stone Aerospace is now looking at designs integrating a scaled-down version of the HAUV submersible called ARTEMIS (4.3 m or 14 ft 1 in long, 1,270 kg or 2,800 lb) with VALKYRIE-type technology to produce SPINDLE. This goal is a full-scale cryobot which can melt its way to an Antarctic subglacial lake —Lake Vostok— to collect samples, and then resurface. SPINDLE does not use hot water jets as its predecessor VALKYRIE, but will beam its laser straight into the ice ahead. The vehicle features a radar integrated to an intelligent algorithm for autonomous scientific sampling and navigation through ice and water. This phase of the project would be viewed as a precursor to possible future missions to an icy world such as Europa, Enceladus, or Ganymede to explore the liquid water oceans thought to be present below their ice, assess their potential habitability and seek biosignatures. If the system is flown to an icy moon, it would likely deposit radio receiver buoys into the ice from its rear as it makes its descent.

SPINDLE is designed for a 1.5 to 4 km (0.93 to 2.49 mi) penetration through a terrestrial ice sheet and the HAUV has been designed for exploration up to one kilometer (0.62 mi) radius from the cryobot. The cryobot is bi-directional and vertically controllable both in an ice sheet as well as following breakthrough into a subglacial water cavity or ocean. The vehicle is designed for subsequent return to the surface at a much later date or subsequent season.

The required power plant must be very powerful, so the engineers are working on preliminary designs of a compact fission power plant that would be used for actual ocean planet missions.

== See also ==
- Cryobot – Autonomous ice penetrator vehicle
- DEPTHX – Autonomous underwater vehicle for exploring sinkholes in Mexico
- ENDURANCE – Autonomous underwater vehicle
- IceMole – Autonomous ice penetrator vehicle
