= Cis-Lunar =

Manufacturer of electronically controlled closed-circuit rebreathers for scuba diving

Cis-Lunar was a manufacturing company that produced automatic, computer-controlled, and closed-circuit rebreathers for astronauts and underwater divers. The company was formed in 1984 and was acquired by Stone Aerospace in 2004.

== History ==
Cis-Lunar originally aimed to develop space suit kits, but the early 2000s recession reportedly hindered its ability to finance the mass production of the MK5 rebreather, which featured designs intended to reduce system and mission failures.

In 2005, the Swedish diving equipment manufacturer Poseidon acquired Cis-Lunar's technology. Bill Stone, founder of Stone Aerospace, was appointed to lead a Poseidon team designing a new closed-circuit rebreather.

== Etymology ==
The word cis-lunar comes from Latin and means "on this side of the Moon" or "not beyond the Moon".

== See also ==
- Primary life support system – Life support device for a space suit
- Shackleton Energy Company – American moon mining company
