= Marinov =

Marinov (Bulgarian: Маринов) is a Bulgarian masculine patronymic surname, its feminine counterpart is Marinova (Bulgarian: Мари́нова). The surname Marinov is of Slavic origin. It is derived from the given name Marin, which is itself derived from the Latin name Marinus, meaning "of the sea" or "marine". It may refer to:

- Amnon Marinov (1930–2011), Israeli physicist
- Daniel Marinov (born 2004), Russian artistic gymnast
- Dimiter Marinov (born 1964), Bulgarian-American actor
- Elmira Marinova (born 2007), known professionally as El Ma, Italian-Bulgarian singer-songwriter
- Ivailo Marinov (born 1960), Bulgarian boxer of Turkish ancestry
- Ivan Marinov (canoeist) (born 1968), Bulgarian sprint canoer
- Ivan Marinov (composer) (1928–2003), Bulgarian composer
- Martin Marinov (born 1967), Bulgarian-born Australian flatwater canoer
- Nikola Marinov (1879–1948), Bulgarian painter and teacher
- Sevdalin Marinov (born 1968), Bulgarian weightlifter
- Stefan Marinov (1931–1997), Bulgarian physicist
- Ventsislav Marinov (born 1983), Bulgarian footballer
- Veselin Marinov (born 1961), Bulgarian singer
- Galina Marinova (artistic gymnast) (born 1964), Bulgarian Olympic artistic gymnast
- Galina Marinova (rhythmic gymnast) (born 1985), Bulgarian Olympic rhythmic gymnast
- Katerina Marinova (born 1999), Bulgarian rhythmic gymnast
- Margarita Marinova, Bulgarian aeronautical engineer
- Michelle Marinova, snooker player
- Mihaela Marinova (born 1998), Bulgarian singer and songwriter
- Mila Marinova (born 1974), Bulgarian rhythmic gymnast
- Neli Marinova (born 1971), Bulgarian volleyball player
- Simona Marinova (born 1994), Macedonian swimmer
- Sofi Marinova (born 1975), Bulgarian pop-folk and ethno-pop singer
- Stefan Marinov (1931–1997), Bulgarian physicist
- Tereza Marinova (born 1977), Bulgarian long jumper and triple jumper
- Vanya Marinova (born 1950), Bulgarian Olympic artistic gymnast
- Victoria Marinova (1988–2018), Bulgarian journalist
- Yana Marinova (born 1978), Bulgarian actress
- Yuliana Marinova (born 1967), Bulgarian sprinter
- Zornitsa Marinova (born 1987), Bulgarian rhythmic gymnast

== See also ==
- Marinoff, surname
