= ENDURANCE =

Autonomous underwater vehicle

ENDURANCE (Environmentally Non-Disturbing Under-ice Robotic Antarctic Explorer) is an autonomous underwater vehicle designed to map in three dimensions the geochemistry and biology of underwater terrains in Antarctica. The vehicle was built and designed by Stone Aerospace, and is the second incarnation of the DEPTHX vehicle, which was significantly reconfigured for the challenges particular to the Antarctic environment.

The principal investigator for the ENDURANCE project was Earth and environmental scientist Peter Doran of the University of Illinois at Chicago. Bill Stone, CEO of Stone Aerospace, was a co-investigator, along with John Priscu of Montana State University, and Chris McKay of NASA Ames Research Center. The project was funded by the NASA Astrobiology Science and Technology for Exploring Planets program as well as by the National Science Foundation's United States Antarctic Program.

The name ENDURANCE is a backronym for "Environmentally Non-Disturbing Under-ice Robotic ANtarctic Explorer" as well a tribute to Ernest Shackleton's Antarctic exploration ship Endurance.

== Lake Bonney ==
The vehicle completed two field seasons in Lake Bonney in the Dry Valleys of Antarctica in 2008 and 2009.

== Europa ==
NASA hopes to build upon lessons learned during testing for exploring objects in the Solar System known to harbor sizable bodies of water, such as Jupiter's moon Europa. The future exploration of its internal ocean and search for life are compelling scientific endeavors. The legacy on ENDURANCE has informed the design of the SPINDLE cryobot.

== See also ==
- Cryobot – Autonomous ice penetrator vehicle
- DEPTHX – Autonomous underwater vehicle for exploring sinkholes in Mexico
- IceMole – Autonomous ice penetrator vehicle
- Radioisotope thermoelectric generator – Electrical generator that uses heat from radioactive decay
