= Margarita Marinova =

Bulgarian-born Canadian aeronautical engineer

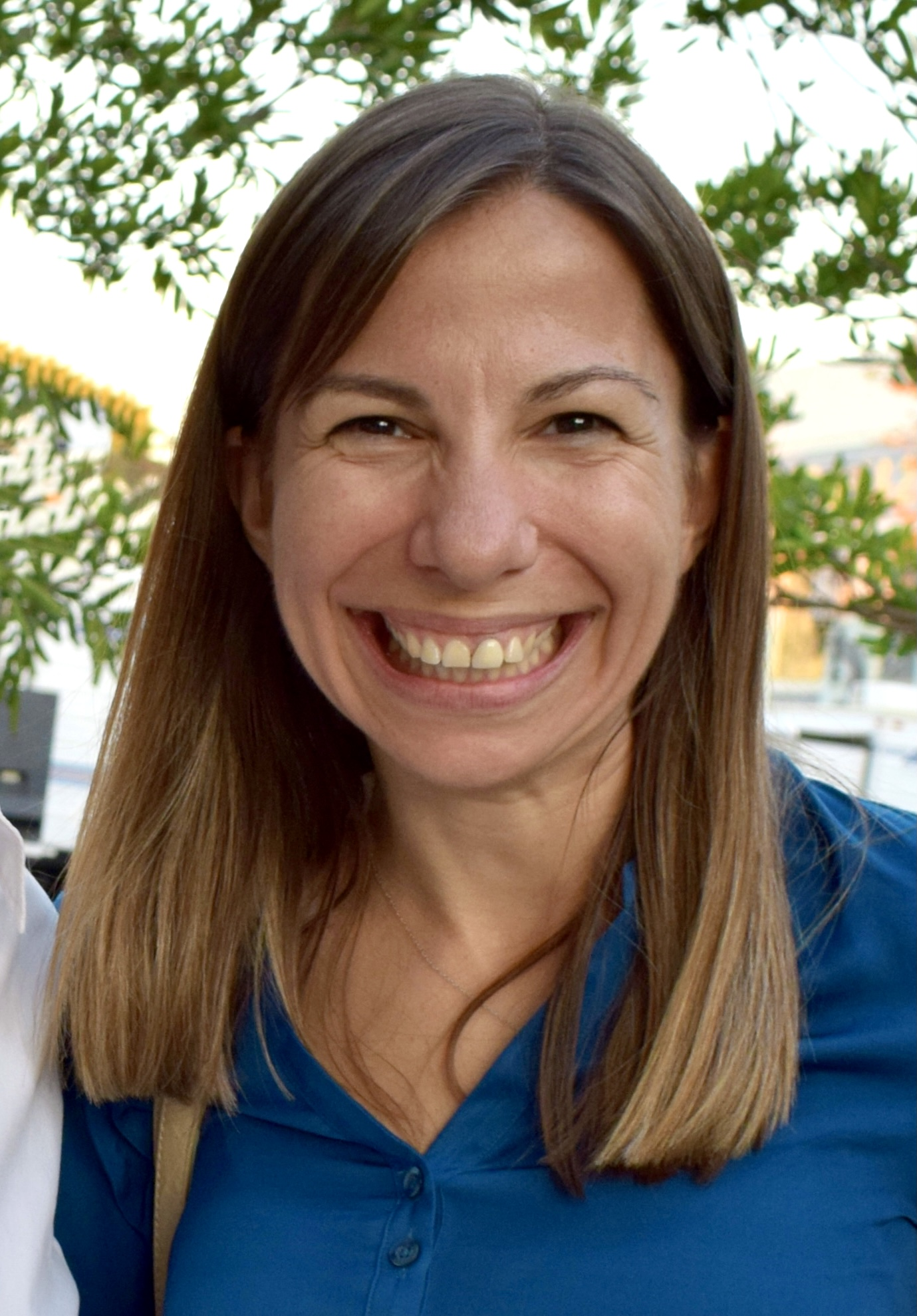
- Marinova in 2017
- Born: Sofia, Bulgaria
- Education: Massachusetts Institute of Technology (BS); California Institute of Technology (MSc, PhD)
- Known for: Terraforming Mars
- Scientific career
- Institutions: SpaceX (2013–present); NASA (2010–2013)
- Thesis: Inquiries into the Consequences of Planetary-Scale Impacts and the Implications of Carbonates in the Hyper-Arid Core of the Sahara (2010)
- Doctoral advisor: Oded Aharonson

Margarita Marinova is a Bulgarian aeronautical engineer. She is the Senior Mars and Vehicle Systems Development Engineer at SpaceX.

== Early life and education ==
Margarita Marinova was born in Bulgaria and can speak five languages: English, Bulgarian, Russian, German and French. When she was 10, she moved to Vienna for one year, before moving to Toronto. Her mother and father were computer engineers. She was the founder and chair of the Toronto Chapter of the international Mars Society whilst at high school. She entered and won the NASA Space Settlement Design Content in 1997, 1998 and 1999. By the age of 18, she had co-authored five science papers. She was determined to one day visit Mars, although she did not always receive encouragement from her adult advisors: "In high school, my guidance counsellor gave me a big speech about how I would never get into an American university".

Marinova completed a Bachelor of Science in Aerospace Engineering at MIT in 2003, specializing in liquid rocket propulsion. As an undergraduate she worked with Chris McKay of NASA Ames Research Center on the warming effects of perfluorocarbons (PFCs), with the aim to trigger a greenhouse effect and eventually terraform Mars. In 2003 she moved to Germany, working for a year at Airbus Safran Launchers on the Calorimetric Nozzle Program, where she investigated heat transfer in an engine rocket nozzle. She completed an MSc in Planetary Science at Caltech in 2006 and a PhD "Inquiries into the consequences of planetary-scale impacts and the implications of carbonates in the hyper-arid core of the Sahara" in 2010, under the supervision of Oded Aharonson. While at Caltech, she led a study published in Nature in 2008 that demonstrated that the dichotomy in the surface age and relative altitude between Mars's northern and southern hemispheres could have been caused by Mars being struck by a large impactor early in its history.

== Research ==
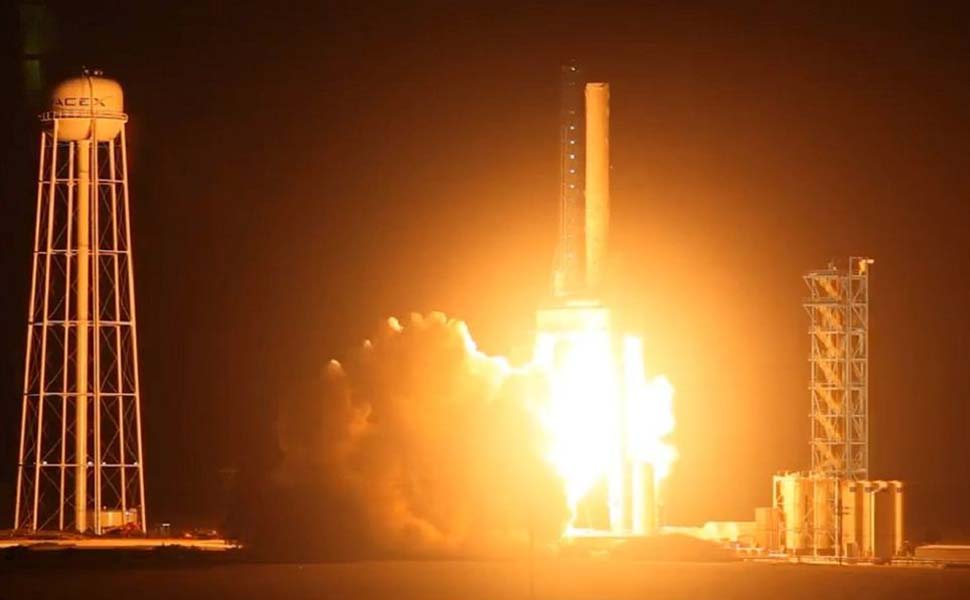
Falcon 9 first stage test firing (2)

Marinova began working with NASA in 2010, where she used Earth analogs (including the Arctic, Sahara Desert, Mount Kilimanjaro and the Dry Valleys of Antarctica) to understand Mars. Here she was one of seven team members who spent three austral summers in Antarctica, testing ice-penetrating drills for a future mission to Mars. NASA's IceBite, which drilled several meters into the ground ice to collect deep ice and search for signs of organics and life, was documented by Marinova for Astrobiology Magazine. Next she joined the Pavilion Lake Research Project, studying at the distribution and morphology of microbialites in Pavilion Lake, Canada. Her final project for NASA was on the Extreme Environments Mission Operations (NEEMO), which sends groups of astronauts, engineers and scientists to live in the Aquarius underwater laboratory, the world's only undersea research station, for up to three weeks at a time in preparation for future space exploration.

In 2013 Marinova joined SpaceX as Vehicle Systems and Propulsion Engineer. She was the Vehicle Lead for the research program on densified propellants for use in the first stage of Falcon 9. She became Senior Mars Development Engineer in 2017. She is Team Lead for a Caltech incubator for determining science questions, collaborations, and mission proposals for Mars subsurface access beyond Mars 2020.
