= Astrobiology Science and Technology for Exploring Planets =

Former NASA program

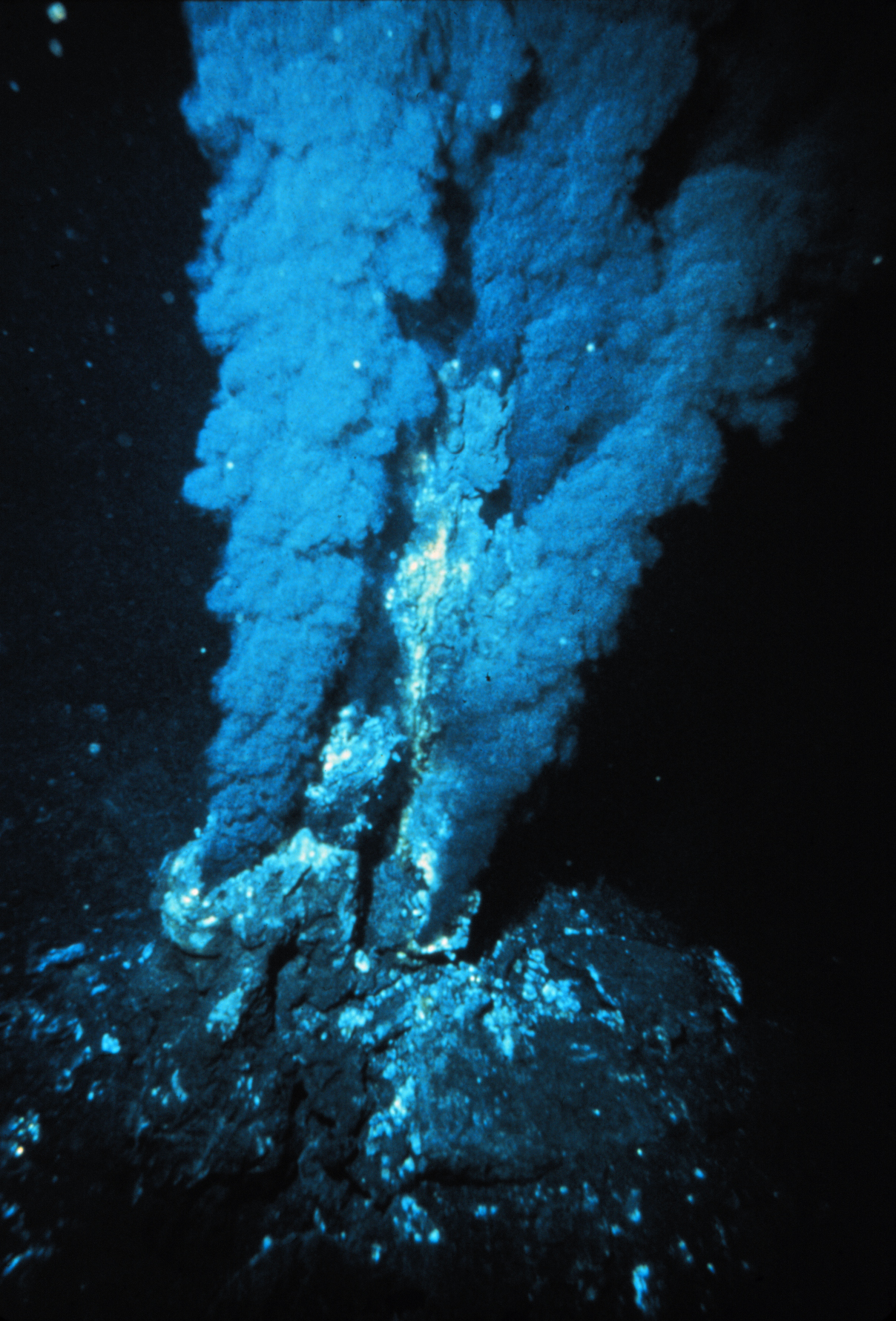
Hydrothermal vents and its ecosystems are a research focus of ASTEP

Astrobiology Science and Technology for Exploring Planets (ASTEP) was a program established by NASA to sponsor research projects that advance the technology and techniques used in planetary exploration. The objective was to enable the study of astrobiology and to aid the planning of extraterrestrial exploration missions while prioritizing science, technology, and field campaigns.

== Overview ==
ASTEP is one of four elements of NASA's Astrobiology Program, which falls under the Planetary Science Division of the Science Mission Directorate. According to the formal description from NASA, "The ASTEP program sponsors the development of technologies that enable remote searches for, and identification of, life in extreme environments, including planetary surfaces and subsurfaces." ASTEP is concerned with discovering technologies which will enable scientists to study astrobiology both on the surface of the Earth and on extraterrestrial bodies. A central focus of ASTEP's research is terrestrial field campaigns, or long-duration expeditions where researchers live in the same region they are studying. These are conducted on Earth in remote or hostile locations, such as Antarctica or the bottom of the ocean. Through understanding complex and exotic life on Earth, such as extremophiles, scientists hope to better define the characteristics they should look for and the locations they should seek when attempting to discover extraterrestrial life.

The program was active from 2001 to 2014, when it was consolidated into the Planetary Science and Technology from Analog Research (PSTAR) program.

== Methodology ==
ASTEP funded projects typically perform research by searching for and studying extremophile biology in Earth's harshest environments through the use of field research campaigns. The environments where this research is conducted is meant to simulate the expected conditions on extraterrestrial worlds in the Solar System. Past field work has typically targeted two regions. Arctic and Antarctic climates simulate the low temperatures expected on many other planets such as Mars, near rover landing sites. Underwater regions are also an area of study because they simulate high pressure, low light and variable temperature conditions. This region simulates proposed missions to explore the vast liquid water ocean that is expected to reside under Jupiter's moon, Europa.

ASTEP promotes the development of new exploration technologies and techniques that can search, identify, and study life in extreme conditions in locations that are difficult to access. There is a broad range of things that can fall into this category. Previous examples include laboratories such as the Mars Science Laboratory, sampling techniques, the Mars rovers, the Titan lander (Huygens), and submersibles. Autonomous systems are preferred because data can be collected without the presence of humans near the test area. The field campaigns are used as a proof-of-concept for the proposed technologies as well as a demonstration. They are generally tested with mock-mission where conditions and challenges simulate those that might be experienced on an actual mission. This helps identify their strengths and weaknesses in the technology's mission execution and structural endurance.

Beyond the practice of new technologies, ASTEP strives to learn more about astrobiology through observation and study on the field campaigns. Analyzing the collected samples helps researchers determine the thermal, photonic, pressure, and chemical boundary conditions for living organisms. Understanding how these organisms adapt and evolve in these extreme conditions may be similar to the methods used by extraterrestrial organisms, and thus offers clues about where life may be found. Another area of study is the environmental footprint that extremophile life leaves behind, biomolecules or biosignatures such as chemical trails, geological formations, etc. Identifying these clues often inspires new biology searching techniques, and simplifies mission planning.

== Past projects ==
=== 2007 ===
- The Deep Phreatic Thermal Explorer (DEPTHX)
- The Arctic Gakkel Vents Expedition (AGAVE)
- The Arctic Mars Analogue Svalbard Expedition (AMASE)
- The Monterey Bay Aquarium Research Institute’s Environmental Sample Processor (ESP)

=== 2008 ===
- The Environmentally Non-Disturbing Under-Ice Robotic Antarctic Explorer (ENDURANCE)
- Arctic Mars Analogue Svalbard Expedition (AMASE) Sample Return
- Oases for Life and Pre-Biotic Chemistry: Hydrothermal Exploration Using Advanced Underwater Robotics
- IceBite: An auger and sampling system for ground ice on Mars
- VALKYRIE: Very-deep Autonomous Laser-powered Kilowatt-class Yo-yoing Robotic Ice Explorer
- Autonomous Exploration, Discovery, and Sampling of Life in Deep Sea Extreme Environments
- Deep Drilling and Sampling Via Compact Low-Mass Rotary-Hammer Auto-Gopher
- Exploration of Deep-Sea Hydrothermal Vent Microbial Communities using the Environmental Sample Processor (ESP)

=== 2011 ===
The 2011 projects included:

- Mars Methane Plume Tracer
- Planetary Lake Lander
- Shallow-Borehole Array for Measuring Greenland Emission of Trace Gases as an Analogue for Methane on Mars (GETGAMM)
- VALKYRIE: Phase 2
- Robotic Investigation of Subsurface Life in the Atacama Desert

== Other projects ==
Stromatolite building provides important geological information on the history of microorganisms dating back to over a billion years ago. In recent years, ASTEP has been researching how these layered fossils could have formed by studying modern day microbial mats, which leave stromatolite similar to their ancestors.

ASTEP's instrument development program is currently working on a prototype to detect the presence of DNA on the Martian surface. The prototype will replicate any DNA found in Martian ice or regolith using polymerase chain reaction amplification techniques.

The IceBite Project involves testing drills for future Martian missions where ice will need to be penetrated. The research is being conducted in high altitude Antarctic valleys which closely resemble the Phoenix landing site in geologic composition. As of 2009, the scientists have successfully completed the first phase of the three-year mission, which was to probe the region, install scientific instruments, and determine the future testing sites.

A team of ASTEP scientists are exploring the Mid-Cayman Spreading Center, a wide ridge at the westernmost region of the Cayman Trough. Oceanic life reaches the extremes at the depths, where the pressure is the greatest and underwater sea vents pump hot and mineral-rich water into the ocean. Project researchers think extraterrestrial life could be similar to the exotic life forms found near these vents. The submersible Nereus was developed by ASTEP to autonomously survey the hydrothermal vent systems at the depths of the Mid-Cayman Spreading Center.

== Publicity ==
In order to raise awareness about the research being conducted under the auspices of ASTEP, scientists have been increasingly using blogs as a way to convey information about their studies, typically when they are performing science at a remote location on a terrestrial field test. Scientists have also begun contacting museums via satellite uplink to discuss astrobiology with the public. The most prominent blog is produced by NASA's IceBite team, which performs annual expeditions to Antarctica.

== See also ==
- Abiogenesis
- NASA Astrobiology Institute
- Nexus for Exoplanet System Science

== Works cited ==
1. Billings, L. (2008, 01 22). About ASTEP. Retrieved from Astrobiology: https://web.archive.org/web/20100528091403/http://astrobiology.nasa.gov/astep/about/
2. Billings, L. (2008, 02 06). NASA Astrobiology Roadmap 2008. Retrieved from Astrobiology: https://web.archive.org/web/20100219093302/http://astrobiology.nasa.gov/roadmap/
3. Commodore, J. (2010, 02). NRA Proposers Guidebook - Final. Retrieved from NASA: http://www.hq.nasa.gov/office/procurement/nraguidebook/
4. German, C. (2009, 10 21). Astrobiology Magazine. Retrieved from Oases for Life on the Mid-Caymen Rise: http://www.astrobio.net/pressrelease/3287/oases-for-life-on-the-mid-caymen-rise
5. Marinova, M. (2010, 02 01). Astrobiology Magazine. Retrieved from IceBite Blog: Saying Farewell to a Frozen World: http://www.astrobio.net/index.php?option=com_expedition&task=detail&id=3388&type=blog&pid=19
6. Peter Doran, P. C. (2010). RESULTS FROM ASTEP AND OTHER ASTROBIOLOGY FIELD CAMPAIGNS II.
7. Schirber, M. (2010, 01 03). Astrobiology Magazine. Retrieved from First Fossil-Makers in Hot Water: http://www.astrobio.net/exclusive/3418/first-fossil-makers-in-hot-water
8. Schirber, M. (2010, 02 15). Astrobiology Magazine. Retrieved from Detecting Our Martian Cousins: http://www.astrobio.net/exclusive/3401/detecting-our-martian-cousins
