= Marinoff =

Marinoff is a surname. Notable people with the surname include:

- Ebony Marinoff (born 1997), Australian rules footballer
- Fania Marinoff (1890–1971), American actress
- Jacob Marinoff (1869–1964), American Yiddish publisher and author
- Lou Marinoff, Canadian-born academic and author

== See also ==
- Marinov, surname
