= Stone Aerospace =

Aerospace engineering firm founded by Bill Stone

Stone Aerospace is an aerospace engineering firm founded by engineer and explorer Bill Stone, located in Del Valle, a suburb of Austin, Texas.

== History ==
Bill Stone began Stone Aerospace as a part-time consulting business in 1999, at which time he was working at the National Institute of Standards and Technology. At the time, Stone already had an extensive background in underground and underwater exploration, which had led him to develop several technologies to further human exploration capabilities. This background, and in particular the success of the Wakulla II Project in Wakulla Springs, Florida, which employed Stone's human-navigated digital wall mapper, lead to inquiries as to whether it would be possible to design an autonomous underwater vehicle, which could explore on its own, making exploration possible where it was not safe or possible for human divers to go. After submitting several proposals to NASA, in 2003 DEPTHX was funded.

Shortly thereafter Stone's Piedra-Sombra Corporation began doing business as Stone Aerospace in Del Valle, Texas. After the successful autonomous exploration by DEPTHX of several cenotes in Mexico, NASA then funded the ENDURANCE Project, which spent two seasons exploring frozen-over lakes in the Dry Valleys of Antarctica. Project VALKYRIE was awarded NASA funding in 2010, and it was field-tested in Matanuska Glacier, Alaska in 2015. Currently, Stone Aerospace is further refining its technologies to produce a full sized cryobot called SPINDLE.

== DEPTHX ==
DEPTHX was a NASA-funded project for which Stone Aerospace was the Principal Investigator. Co-investigators included Carnegie Mellon University, which was responsible for the navigation and guidance software, the Southwest Research Institute, which built the vehicle's science payload, and research scientists from the University of Texas at Austin, the Colorado School of Mines, and NASA Ames Research Center. The DEPTHX vehicle was a fully autonomous underwater vehicle outfitted with scientific sampling equipment designed to expand upon the limits of human underwater exploration, and was successfully tested over two field seasons in cenotes in south east Mexico. Among its most notable accomplishments were the discovery of at least three new divisions of bacteria (the first such discovery by a robotic vehicle) and the first use of three-dimensional simultaneous localization and mapping (SLAM).

== ENDURANCE ==
The NASA-funded ENDURANCE project built upon the successes of DEPTHX. The DEPTHX vehicle itself was reconfigured to create ENDURANCE, with a new science payload and new navigation systems added to meet the challenges particular to the frozen-over environment in Antarctica, where it spent two field seasons. The principal investigator for ENDURANCE was Peter Doran of the University of Illinois at Chicago. Co-investigators were Stone Aerospace, John Priscu of Montana State University, and NASA Ames Research Center. ENDURANCE spent two seasons exploring West Lake Bonney in the Dry Valleys, autonomously collecting aqueous chemistry data as well as making high-resolution maps of the lake floor and the portion of Taylor Glacier which interfaces with the lake. The results are thought to be one of the most comprehensive three-dimensional biogeochemical maps of any lake on the planet. The project was the subject of an episode of National Geographic Explorer in 2010 which focused on the goal of discovering life on Jupiter's moon, Europa.

== VALKYRIE ==
In 2011, NASA awarded Stone Aerospace $4 million to fund the Phase 2 of project VALKYRIE (Very-Deep Autonomous Laser-Powered Kilowatt-Class Yo-Yoing Robotic Ice Explorer). This project created an autonomous cryobot capable of melting through vast amounts of ice. The 5 kW power source on the surface uses optic fiber to conduct a high-energy laser beam to produce hot water jets that melt the ice ahead. Some beam energy is converted to electricity via photovoltaic cells to power on-board electronics and jet pumps. Phase 2 of project VALKYRIE consisted of testing a scaled-down version of the cryobot in Matanuska Glacier, Alaska in 2015.

== SPINDLE ==
Stone Aerospace is now integrating a prototype submersible called ARTEMIS (4.3 m long, 1,270 kg) with the VALKYRIE technology to produce SPINDLE. This phase will use a full-scale version of the cryobot which will melt its way to an Antarctic subglacial lake —Lake Vostok— to collect samples, and then resurface. The vehicle features a radar integrated to an intelligent algorithm for autonomous scientific sampling and navigation through ice and water. This phase of the project would be viewed as a precursor to possible future missions to an icy moon.

== Sunfish ==
Stone Aerospace developed an autonomous underwater vehicle called Sunfish that was used to map flooded caves in Florida (Peacock Springs) in 2017–2018 and Namibia (Lake Guinas, Harasib Cave, and Dragon's Breath Cave) in 2019, and Hudson Grotto in Florida in 2020.

== See also ==
- Bill Stone – American engineer, caver and explorer
- DEPTHX – Autonomous underwater vehicle for exploring sinkholes in Mexico
- ENDURANCE – Autonomous underwater vehicle
- Shackleton Energy Company – American moon mining company
