= Cryobot =

Autonomous ice penetrator vehicle

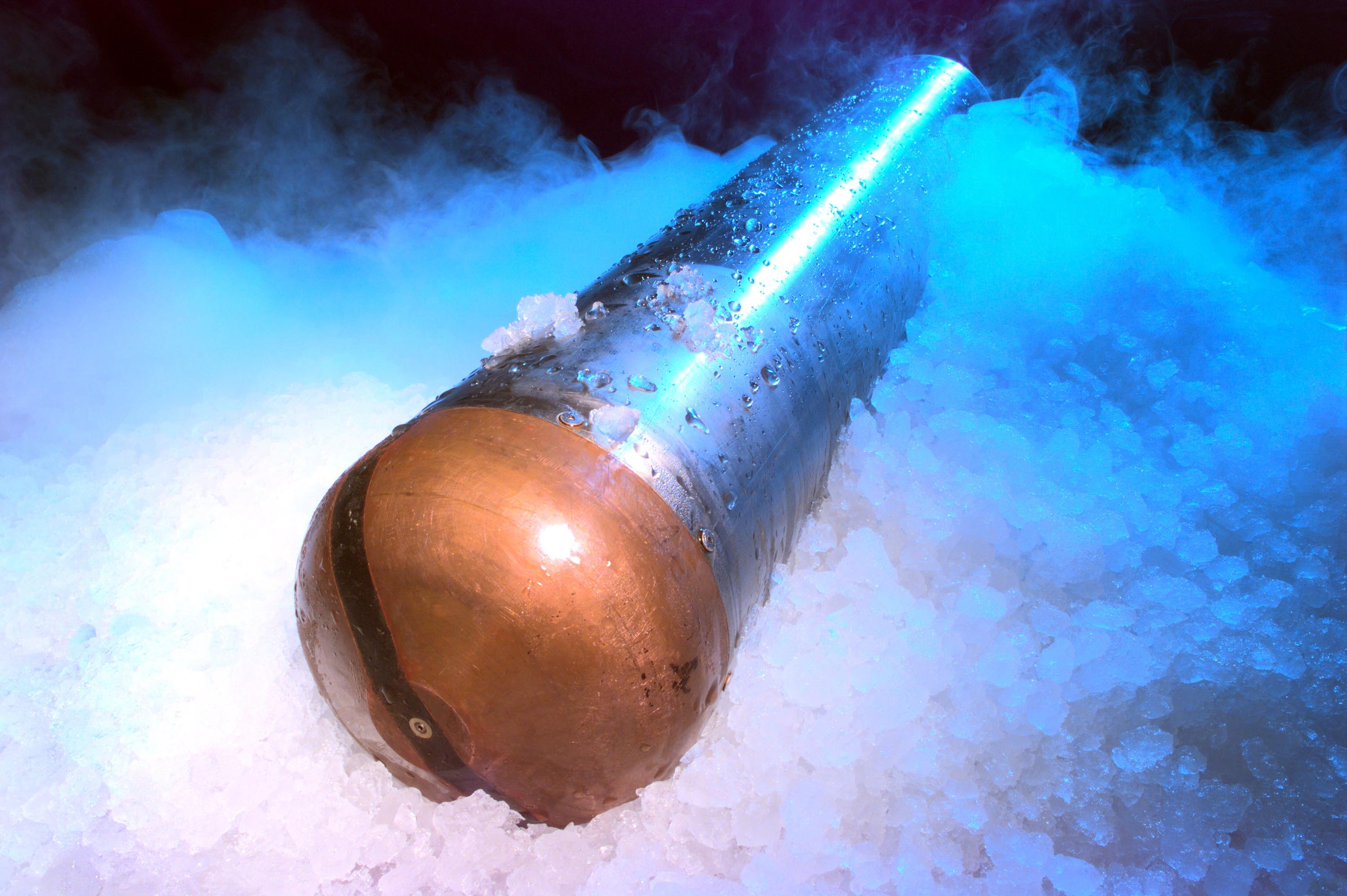
Cryobot prototype

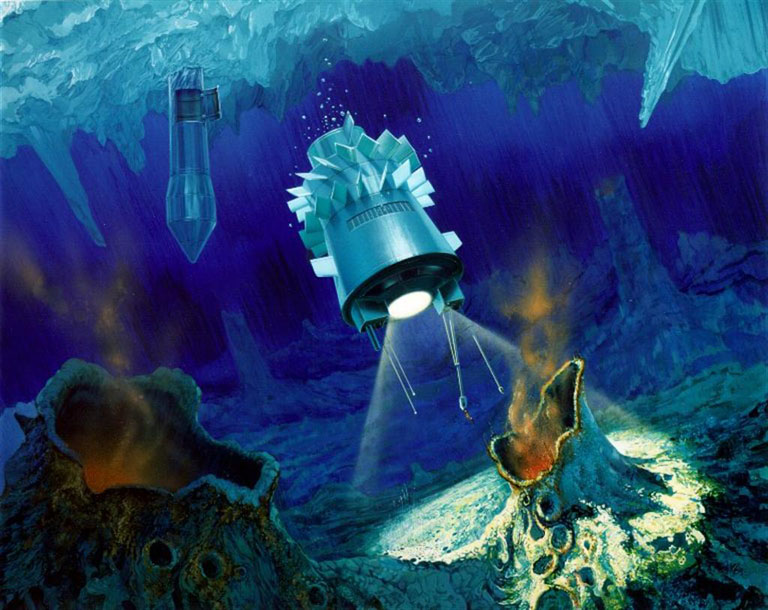
Artist's impression of a cryobot deploying a hydrobot

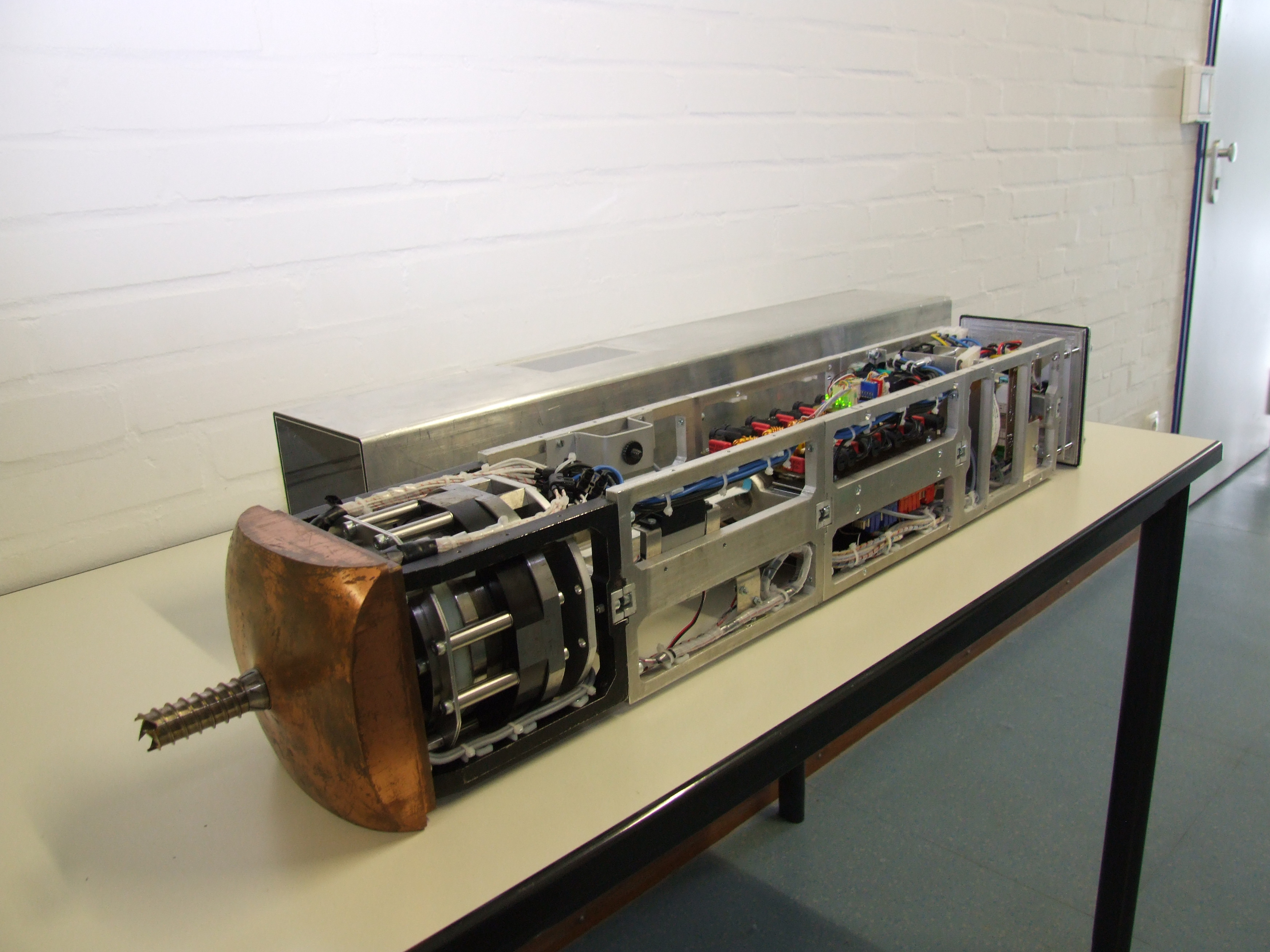
Prototype IceMole, a further development

A cryobot or Philberth-probe is a robot that can penetrate water ice. A cryobot uses heat to melt the ice, and gravity to sink downward.

== Features and technology ==
The cryobot is a surface-controlled instrumented vehicle desired to penetrate polar ice sheets down to 3,600 metres (11,800 ft) by melting. If built, it would likely measure temperature, stress, ice movement, and seismic, acoustic and dielectric properties. Such concept could also be used for other investigations with remote instrumentation. The general concept uses a hot point for melt penetration, instrumentation for control and measurement functions, supply conductor coils to link the probe with the surface for transmission of power and measurement signals.

== History ==
The cryobot was invented by German physicist Karl Philberth, who first demonstrated it in the 1960s as part of the International Glaciological Greenland Expedition (EGIG), achieving drilling depths in excess of 1,000 metres (3,300 ft). In 1973 British scientists in Antarctica performed airborne ice-penetrating radar survey and detected a possible lake. In 1991, the European remote sensing satellite ERS-1 confirmed the 1973 discovery of a large lake below four kilometers of ice, now named Lake Vostok. The lake, which is the fifth largest freshwater lake in the world, is thought to be uncontaminated. In 2002 NASA was planning to use a cryobot to explore the lake, but the project did not happen.

In 2011, NASA awarded Stone Aerospace $4 million to fund the Phase 2 of project VALKYRIE (Very-Deep Autonomous Laser-Powered Kilowatt-Class Yo-Yoing Robotic Ice Explorer). This project aims to create an autonomous cryobot capable of melting through vast amounts of ice. The probe's power source differs from many other designs in that it does not rely on nuclear power to generate heat, but rather the power of a high energy laser fed to it through a fiber optic cable. This is beneficial because nuclear probes are not allowed for testing in Antarctica as a result of the Antarctic Treaty. Phase 2 of project VALKYRIE consisted of testing a scaled-down version of the cryobot in Matanuska Glacier, Alaska in 2015. Following the success of these missions, Phase 3 of the project is then used a full-scale version of the cryobot to melt its way to a subglacial lake, collect samples, and then resurface. It featured a radar on the probe, integrated to an intelligent algorithm for autonomous scientific sampling and navigation. The test was performed in 2017 on a probe called "Archimedes".

Stone Aerospace integrated their ARTEMIS submersible with the VALKYRIE laser technology to develop a sophisticated cryobot called SPINDLE (Sub-glacial Polar Ice Navigation, Descent, and Lake Exploration). This third phase of the project would be viewed as a precursor to possible future missions to the icy moons of Europa, a moon of Jupiter, and Enceladus, a moon of Saturn, to explore the liquid water oceans thought to be present below their ice, and assess their potential habitability.

== See also ==
- Autonomous underwater vehicle – Uncrewed underwater vehicle with autonomous guidance system
- BRUIE – Autonomous underwater vehicle
- DEPTHX – Autonomous underwater vehicle for exploring sinkholes in Mexico
- IceMole – Autonomous ice penetrator vehicle
- Radioisotope thermoelectric generator – Electrical generator that uses heat from radioactive decay
