= Thiomicrorhabdus arctica =

Scientific classification
- Domain: Bacteria
- Kingdom: Pseudomonadati
- Phylum: Pseudomonadota
- Class: Gammaproteobacteria
- Order: Thiotrichales
- Family: Piscirickettsiaceae
- Genus: Thiomicrorhabdus
- Species: T. arctica

Binomial name
- Thiomicrorhabdus arctica (Knittel et al. 2005) Boden et al. 2017

Species of bacterium

Thiomicrorhabdus arctica (synonym: Thiomicrospira arctica) is an obligately psychrophilic chemolithoautotrophic sulfur-oxidizing bacteria. It was first isolated from arctic sediments off the coast of Svalbard in 1998. It is found in marine and saline sediments, including intertidal mudflats, continental shelf sediments, hydrothermal vent systems, hypersaline ponds, saline springs, and freshwater ponds. It has also been isolated from Blood Falls, located in the McMurdo Dry Valleys in Victoria Land, East Antarctica.

== Physiology and morphology ==
The cells of Thiomicrorhabdus arctica are gram-negative, motile, and rod shaped. They measured about 0.5–0.6 μm wide and 1.2–1.5 μm in length. Optimum growth conditions are at a pH of 7.3-8.0, and while they can tolerate temperatures ranging from 6.5-9.0 °C, they prefer temperatures of 11.5-13.2 °C.

== Distribution and habitat ==
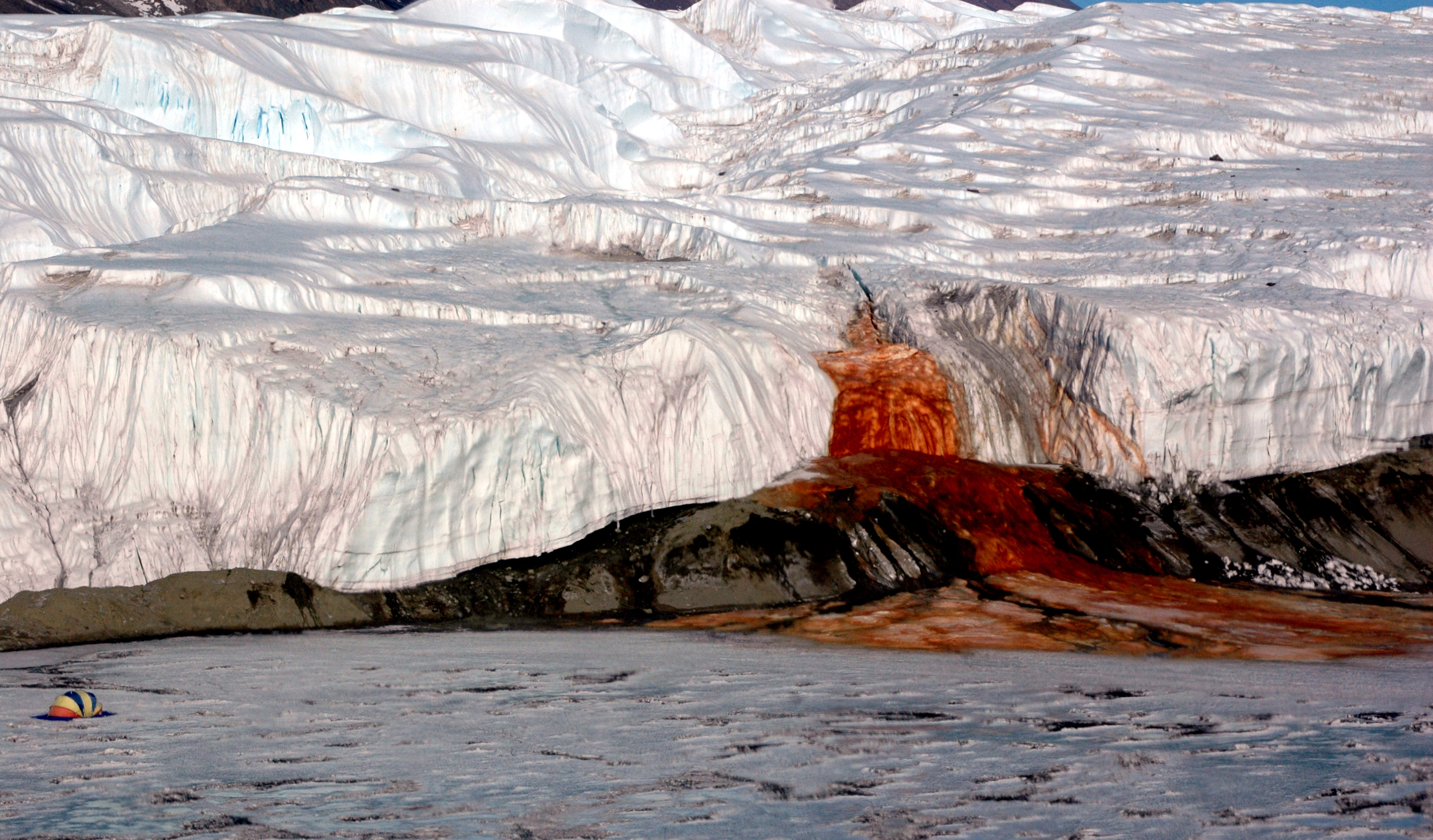
Blood Falls, 2006

Thiomicrorhabdus arctica was initially isolated from arctic sediments in Svalbard, Norway, in July 1998. This species thrives in hydrothermal vents, coastal sediments, hypersaline lakes, and other sulfidic habitats. There have been 226 operational taxonomic unit (OTU) samples collected and 46.5% of the samples have come from aquatic locations, while 9.73% have been sampled from animals, 2.21% from soil samples, and 41.6% collected from 'unknown' sources. Thiomicrorhabdus arctica has also been isolated from sediments in Blood Falls, which is a small, saltwater outflow in Victoria Land, East Antarctica. 16S rRNA gene sequencing indicated that 99% of water samples collected matched sequencing for this species. This location serves as an ideal habitat for this species due to the surplus of ferrous ions and sulfates present in the unfrozen saltwater that are oxidized in contact with atmospheric oxygen, which once broken down, produce the red pigment that characterizes and gives the name to Blood Falls.

== Metabolism ==
Thiomicrorhabdus species are all capable of using reduced sulfur compounds as electron donors and are described as chemolithoautotrophs. Chemolithoautotrophs are one of two classifications of lithoautotrophs, which are organisms that derive energy from the breakdown of mineral (inorganic) origin. Also known as chemoautotrophs, these species are specifically microbes and derive their energy from chemical reactions whereas photolithoautotrophs derive their energy from light. Chemoautotrophs can use inorganic energy sources such as ferrous iron, hydrogen sulfide, elemental sulfur, molecular hydrogen, and ammonia. In lab settings, this species been observed to utilize tetrathionate as an energy source and production of elementary sulfur when growing on thiosulfate at neutrality.

== Classification ==
Thiomicrorhabdus arctica was originally placed in the genus Thiomicrospira genus by Knittel, et al. in 2005, however, it was later recommended to be placed in a new genus Thiomicrorhabdus gen. nov. on the basis of its 16S rRNA sequence data, morphology and physiology by Boden et al. in 2017.
