= Bernhard Philberth =

Bernhard Josef Philberth (26 March 1927 in Traunstein, Germany – 8 August 2010 in Melbourne) was an independent physicist, engineer and philosopher. He was ordained a Roman Catholic priest in 1972.

== Biography ==
Philberth was a member of the Academy of Science of Chieti (Italy), the Academy of Sciences of Besançon(France; where he was the first German to be accepted in a century), the Physical Society of Japan in Tokyo and the International Glaciological Society in London.

He was the originator of a project in the 1960s to investigate the disposal of radioactive waste deep inside stable, inland ice sheets (presented by the French High Commissioner for Nuclear Energy). His brother, Prof Karl Philberth headed the thermal drilling program of the International Glaciological Greenland Expedition (EGIG) as part of the project.

In relativity physics, Philberth discovered the "time gradient" ("Zeitgradient" in German) (presented by Louis de Broglie), and the relationship between the electromagnetic fundamental values.

With his brother, he was granted over a hundred patents for inventions in various areas of physics, such as the "cryobot" (also known as a Philberth probe) and the Philberth transformer. He authored numerous technical publications on nuclear energy, energy management and patent law.

Philberth was also an environmentalist and initiated efforts to protect the environment using taxation law. He made a submission to the Deutsche Bundestag which resulted in a change in oil tax and was the originator of taxation of lead in petrol (law passed by the Bundestag in 1984).

As firm believers in philanthropy, the Philberth brothers founded of the "PH-Foundation" in the Philippines, which sponsors the education of youths from disadvantaged families (with over 2,000 graduates to date).

He died on 8 August 2010 due to pneumonia.

== Books ==
- "Christliche Prophetie und Nuklearenergie" (ISBN 3-7171-0182-X) (EN: "Christian Prophecy and Nuclear Energy")
- "Der Dreieine" (ISBN 3-7171-0183-8) (EN: "The Triune")
- "Das All" (ISBN 3-7171-0821-2) (EN: "The Universe")
- "Überleben ohne Erfindungen?" (ISBN 3-7171-0846-8) (EN: "Survival without Innovation?")
- "Offenbarung" (ISBN 0-646-20838-1) (EN: "Revelation" (ISBN 0-646-20837-3))
- "Der Souverän" (ISBN 0-646-33833-1) (EN: "The Sovereign" (ISBN 0-646-33834-X))

== Further publications ==
- XIV World Congress of Philosophy in Vienna (1968, File Volume IV)
- "Prominenten-Interviews", G. Klempnauer (Brockhaus)
- "Auf Hoffnung hin", J. Neumann (Kyrios)
- "Information", P.Huebner (rororo)
