= William Stone (caver) =

American engineer, caver and explorer

- Born: William C. Stone; December 7, 1952 (age 73); Pennsylvania, US
- Education: University of Texas at Austin
- Occupation: CEO of Stone Aerospace
- Known for: Exploration of deep caves

William C. Stone (born December 7, 1952) is an American engineer, caver and explorer, known for exploring deep caves, sometimes with autonomous underwater vehicles. He has participated in over 40 international expeditions and is president and CEO of Stone Aerospace.

== Biography ==
Stone was born on December 7, 1952, in Pennsylvania. He was an active caver in the Rensselaer Polytechnic Institute's Outing Club while studying for a B.S. in Civil Engineering, awarded in 1974. In 1976, while studying engineering at the University of Texas at Austin, Stone took part in an expedition to the Sistema Huautla in Oaxaca, Mexico, where his group set a new penetration depth record of 2,624 feet (800 m).

After obtaining a Ph.D. in engineering, Stone worked at the National Institute of Standards and Technology in Gaithersburg, Maryland from 1980 to 2004. While at the institute, Stone established the Construction Metrology and Automation Group. He led the group for seven years before stepping down to focus on projects at Stone Aerospace.

From 1998 to 1999, Stone directed an international group of explorers consisting of over 100 volunteers to participate in the Wakulla 2 Project. Upon securing a permit from the State of Florida the expedition began mapping the cave of Wakulla Springs, near Tallahassee, Florida.

Stone was the principal investigator for the NASA-funded DEPTHX project, which produced a highly advanced AUV to explore the world's deepest sinkholes. The success of that project was key in getting funding for the ENDURANCE project, with Professor Peter Doran of the University of Illinois at Chicago as its principal investigator. ENDURANCE completed two field seasons at Lake Bonney in the Dry Valleys of Antarctica in 2008 and 2009. Both projects served as a testing ground for developing a vehicle that can autonomously scour the seas of Jupiter's moon Europa for signs of microbial life.

Stone's caving expeditions in Sistema Huautla in Oaxaca, Mexico is chronicled in his book, Beyond the Deep: The Deadly Descent Into the World's Most Treacherous Cave (2002), which he co-authored with Barbara am Ende and Monte Paulsen. Stone also figures prominently in James Tabor's book Blind Descent: The Quest to Discover the Deepest Place on Earth (2010), which discusses his contribution to extreme caving and summarizes many of Stone's caving expeditions, most notably those to Huautla and Cheve.

== MK1 rebreather ==
In December 1987, Bill Stone became known to the wider diving community when he demonstrated the Cis-Lunar MK1 model rebreather at Wakulla Springs, Florida in a scuba dive which lasted 24 hours and used only half of the system's capacity.

== TED appearance ==
Bill Stone gave a talk at TED 2007 about exploring the world's deepest caves and frontier space travel. In the talk, Stone pledged his devotion to lead a mining expedition to the Moon "to mine ice thought to be trapped on the Moon's southern pole at Shackleton Crater, and to sell derived products (including propellants and other consumables) on the Moon and in low Earth orbit (LEO) to international consumers."

== See also ==
- Shackleton Energy Company – American moon mining company
