= Jill Mikucki =

American microbiologist, educator and Antarctic researcher

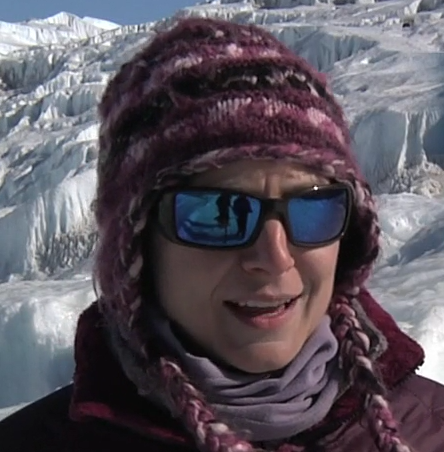
- Mikucki in the Antarctic
- Education: University of North Carolina Wilmington (BA); Portland State University (MS); Montana State University (PhD)
- Scientific career
- Fields: Polar microbiology
- Workplaces: University of Tennessee
- Website: Jill Mikucki at the University of Tennessee

Jill Ann Mikucki is an American microbiologist, educator and Antarctic researcher, best known for her work at Blood Falls demonstrating that microbes can grow below ice in the absence of sunlight. She is a leader of international teams studying ecosystems under the ice.

== Early life and education ==
Mikucki earned her B.A. in 1996 at the University of North Carolina, Wilmington, her M.S. in 2001 from Portland State University, and her Ph.D. in 2005 at Montana State University. A life-long love of cold and snow helped lead her to a career in Antarctic research. Mikucki conducted her Ph.D. research on Blood Falls, a plume of iron-oxide rich water that flows from beneath the Taylor Glacier in the McMurdo Dry Valleys of Antarctica. Mikucki's work on Blood Falls was the first to describe the microbiology and geochemistry of the feature.

== Career and impact ==
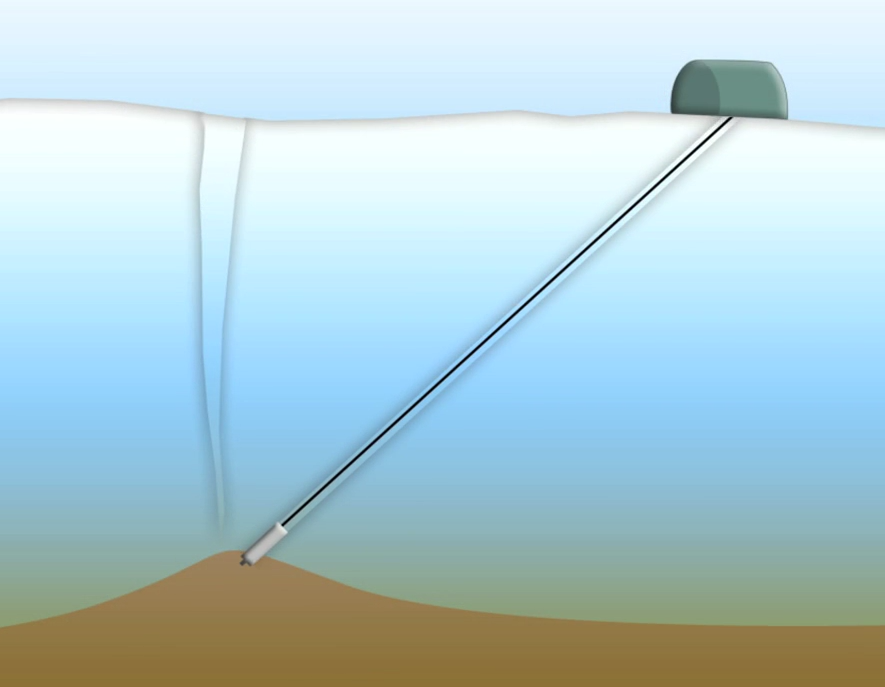
Schematic of drilling to find the brine

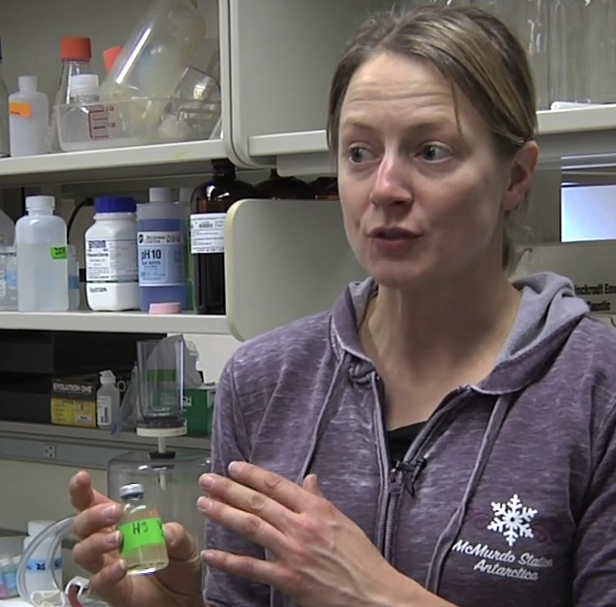
Mikucki with brine sample

As a postdoctoral fellow at Harvard University (2006–07) and Dartmouth College (2008), and a professor at the University of Tennessee, Mikucki continued her work at Blood Falls. Mikucki's work demonstrated that microbes can grow below ice in the absence of sunlight by using sulfate and iron to help them metabolize organic matter.

Her continuing work at Blood Falls led to the discovery of a network of salty groundwater beneath Antarctica's McMurdo Dry Valleys, which is likely the source of the Blood Falls outflow, and a habitat for subsurface microorganisms. The work was also the first ever use of airborne resistivity in Antarctica.

Mikucki was part of the first team to drill into and sample an Antarctic subglacial lake, which demonstrated the existence of life deep beneath Antarctic ice for the first time.

== Selected works ==
- Christner, B.C.; Priscu, J.C.; Achberger, A.M.; Barbante, C.; Carter, S.P.; Christianson, K.; Michaud, A.B.; Mikucki, J.A.; Mitchell, A.C.; Skidmore, M.L.; Vick-Majors, T.J. (2014). "A microbial ecosystem beneath the West Antarctic ice sheet". Nature. 512 (7514): 310–313. Bibcode:2014Natur.512..310.. doi:10.1038/nature13667. hdl:2160/30202. PMID 25143114. S2CID 4470332.
- Mikucki, J.A.; Priscu, J.C. (2007). "Bacterial diversity associated with Blood Falls, a subglacial outflow from the Taylor Glacier, Antarctica". Applied and Environmental Microbiology. 73 (12): 4029–4039. doi:10.1128/aem.01396-06. PMC 1932727. PMID 17468282.
- Mikucki, J.A.; Liu, Y.; Delwiche, M.; Colwell, F.S.; Boone, D.R. (2003). "Isolation of a methanogen from deep marine sediments that contain methane hydrates, and description of Methanoculleus submarinus sp. nov" (PDF). Applied and Environmental Microbiology. 69 (6): 3311–3316. doi:10.1128/aem.69.6.3311-3316.2003. PMC 161549. PMID 12788731.
- Mikucki, J.A.; Pearson, A.; Johnston, D.T.; Turchyn, A.V.; Farquhar, J.; Schrag, D.P.; Anbar, A.D.; Priscu, J.C.; Lee, P.A. (2009). "A Contemporary Microbially Maintained Subglacial Ferrous" Ocean"". Science. 324 (5925): 397–400. Bibcode:2009Sci...324..397M. doi:10.1126/science.1167350. PMID 19372431. S2CID 44802632.

== See also ==
- Blood Falls
- John Charles Priscu
