= BRUIE =

Autonomous underwater vehicle

Buoyant Rover for Under-Ice Exploration (BRUIE)
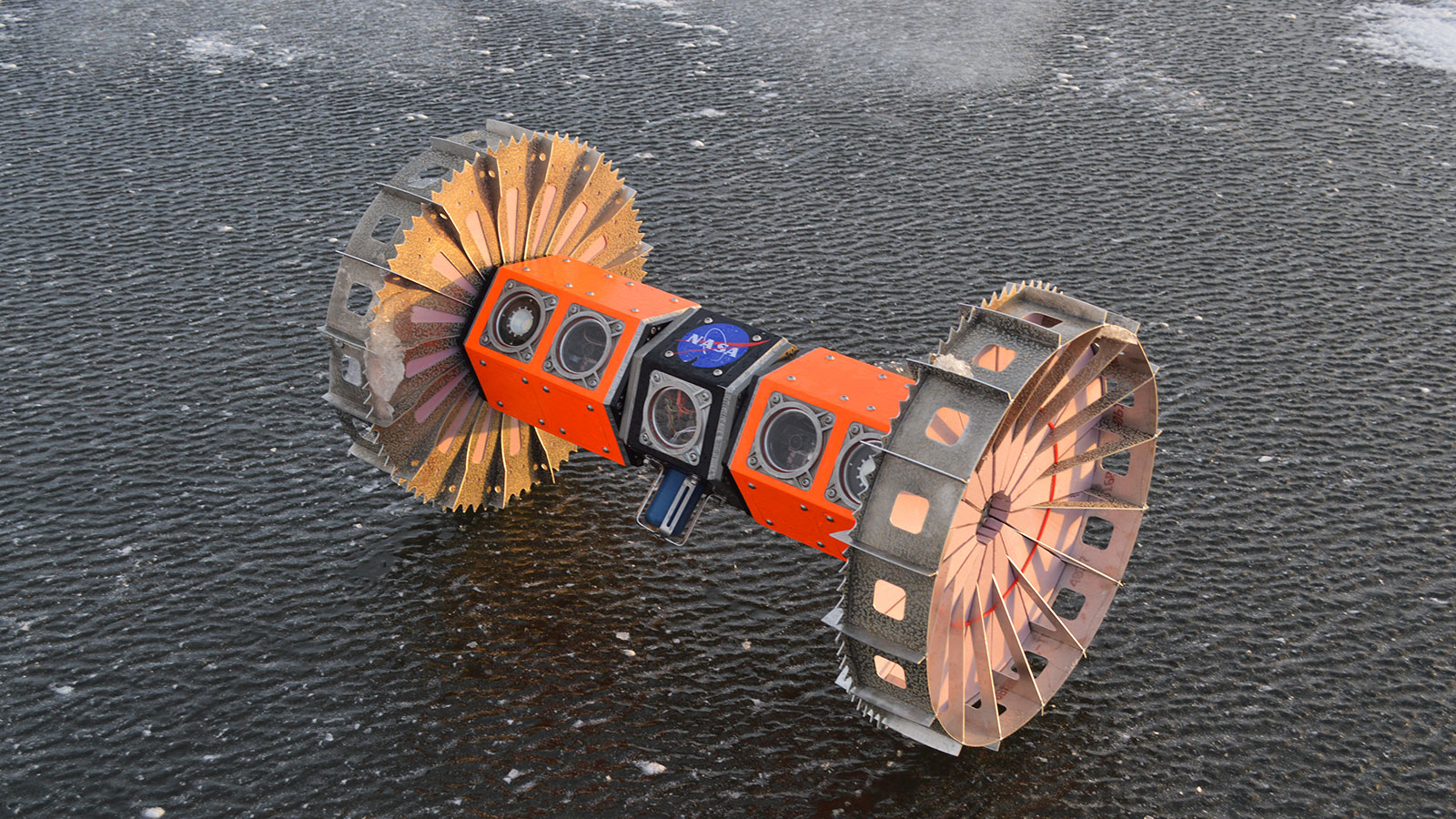
- BRUIE prototype
- Designer: NASA's Jet Propulsion Laboratory
- Country of origin: US
- Operator: NASA
- Applications: Planetary science, astrobiology

Specifications
- Spacecraft type: robotic aquatic rover
- Design life: several months

Dimensions
- Length: 1 m (3 ft 3 in)

Capacity

Payload to {{{to}}}

Production
- Status: in development

BRUIE (Buoyant Rover for Under-Ice Exploration) is an autonomous underwater vehicle prototype by NASA's Jet Propulsion Laboratory. The prototype began underwater testing in 2012 and it is meant to eventually explore the interior of water worlds in the Solar System, such as Europa or Enceladus.

== Overview ==
On Earth, aquatic life is often found at the ice-water interface, so researchers designed the robotic rover to be buoyant and use its two wheels (25 cm (10 in) each) to roll along beneath the ice and look for life or their biosignatures. Scientists can also learn a lot from the topography of the underside of the ice, including how the ice forms. And the ice can act as a trap for gases, either from biological or geological processes.

The first BRUIE prototype began testing in 2012 in an Arctic lake in Alaska, and in Antarctica in 2019. The principal investigator is Andy Klesh at JPL; the co-investigators are Kevin Hand, Dan Berisford, John Leichty and Josh Schoolcraft. Astrobiologist Kevin Hand at JPL is the lead scientist.

=== Description ===
The rover resembles a bar 1 m (3 ft 3 in) long, with two large studded wheels at each end. BRUIE features cameras, lights, and eventually it will be equipped with wireless communication to remotely navigate autonomously without a tether. It can also carry some scientific instruments, which would be incorporated later if preliminary testing goes well.

BRUIE uses buoyancy to remain anchored against the ice and resist water currents. The sealed air-filled cylindrical body, along with closed-cell foam inside of cone-shaped wheels, provides buoyancy force to enable roving along the underside of the ice. It can safely power down to save battery, turning on only when it needs to take a measurement, so it could spend months observing the under-ice environment at time intervals.

=== Challenges ===
One obstacle facing aquatic vehicles like BRUIE is how to deliver it through the thick ice shell. On Europa, the ice sheet could be up to 30 km (19 mi) thick. One preliminary concept for delivering such vehicles through the ice shell is a nuclear-powered tunneling robot called Cryobot, proposed by German engineers. Heat from nuclear power would melt the ice and the penetrator would propel itself through the hole. Once through, the attached aquatic vehicle could be deployed to explore. The 2025 Europa Clipper orbiter will measure the ice shell thickness of Europa, which will help determine if a vehicle pair like BRUIE and Cryobot are a possible next step.

== See also ==
- Autonomous underwater vehicle – Uncrewed underwater vehicle with autonomous guidance system
- Cryobot – Autonomous ice penetrator vehicle
- DEPTHX – Autonomous underwater vehicle for exploring sinkholes in Mexico
- IceMole – Autonomous ice penetrator vehicle
- Radioisotope thermoelectric generator – Electrical generator that uses heat from radioactive decay
