= Stefan Marinov =

Bulgarian physicist (1931–1997)

- Born: 1 February 1931; Sofia, Bulgaria
- Died: 15 July 1997 (aged 66); Graz, Austria
- Education: Czech Technical University in Prague; Sofia University
- Known for: Free energy The ball-bearing motor on YouTube
- Scientific career
- Fields: Experimental physics Theoretical physics Fringe science
- Workplaces: Sofia University

Notes
- Son Marin Marinov was the vice-Minister of Industry in Bulgaria

Stefan Marinov (Bulgarian: Стефан Маринов) (1 February 1931 – 15 July 1997) was a Bulgarian physicist, researcher, writer, and lecturer who promoted anti-relativistic theoretical viewpoints and later in his life defended the ideas of perpetual motion and free energy. In 1997, he self-published experimental results that confirmed classical electromagnetism and disproved that a machine he had constructed could be a source of perpetual motion.

== Life and education ==
Marinov was born on 1 February 1931 in Sofia to a family of intellectual communists.

In 1948, Marinov finished Soviet College in Prague, then studied physics at the Czech Technical University in Prague and Sofia University. Marinov was an Assistant Professor of Physics from 1960 to 1974 at Sofia University. In 1966–67, 1974, and 1977, Marinov was subject to compulsory psychiatric treatment in Sofia because of his political dissent. In September 1977, Marinov received a passport and successfully emigrated out of the country, moving to Brussels. In 1978, Marinov moved to Washington, D.C. Later he lived in Italy and Austria. In his later years, Marinov earned a living as a horse groom.

== Work ==
One of Marinov's interests was the quest for free energy sources via the construction of toy theories (new axiomatic systems that putatively describe our physical reality) and their experimental testing against mainstream physical theories. In 1992, Marinov wrote a letter to German Federal Chancellor Helmut Kohl in support of a German company, Becocraft, that was doing research into "free energy" technologies and had recently been the target of lawsuits. In the letter, Marinov threatened to set himself on fire at the steps of the German parliament if Kohl was not willing to intervene in favor of Marinov's associates.

== Research ==
Marinov attempted to find experimental disproof of the theory of relativity by testing the speed of light in different directions using an arrangement of coupled mirrors and coupled shutters. Marinov reported in 1974 that he had measured an anisotropy of the velocity of light. However, Marinov's claims have not found acceptance within the scientific community despite his energetic efforts to promote his claims. Marinov planned to develop an updating of the relativistic mechanics and electrodynamics, as described in his self-published book Eppur si Muove. Marinov succeeded in having his claims presented in numerous publications including peer-reviewed journals.

Marinov was involved publicly in many quarrels with John Maddox, the editor of Nature, who refused to print either his papers or his letters to the editor. He retaliated by securing the funds to place a full-page advertisement in Nature expressing his frustration with what he regarded as the dogmatic attitude of the establishment. Marinov himself published a journal, Deutsche Physik, of which he was editor-in-chief and which discussed mainly his ideas on physics.

Stefan Marinov was interested in experiments alleged to violate known physical laws. Marinov claimed to have seen in operation and learned the secret of the so-called "Swiss ML converter" or Testatika electrical generator, another alleged perpetual motion machine, at a religious commune in Switzerland called Methernitha. According to Marinov's account, this 500-member commune, led by religious leader Paul Baumann, met all its energy needs using this device.

Marinov has been the editor of a five-volume encyclopedic series called "Classical Physics". In 1993 Marinov also authored a book on electromagnetism that discoursed on his belief that mainstream scientific thought was mired in dogma and had discarded still-valid knowledge from scientific thought of previous eras. In 1997, in the last issue 21 of Deutsche Physik, Marinov self-published experimental results that disproved that the Siberian Coliu, which Marinov himself had constructed, is a perpetual motion machine, and where Marinov concluded that Ampere's law in electromagnetism is correct.

== Death ==
Marinov died in Graz, Austria on 15 July 1997. He was 66 years old and was survived by his son, Marin Marinov, who at the time was a vice-Minister of Industry of Bulgaria. The cause of death was suicide.

== Works published ==
- Marinov S (1981). Classical Physics, Part I: Mathematical Apparatus. Graz: East-West Publishers.
- Marinov S (1981). Classical Physics, Part II: Axiomatics & Low-Velocity Mechanics. Graz: East-West Publishers.
- Marinov S (1981). Classical Physics, Part III: High-Velocity Mechanics. Graz: East-West Publishers.
- Marinov S (1981). Classical Physics, Part IV: Gravimagretism. Graz: East-West Publishers.
- Marinov S (1981). Classical Physics, Part V: Electromagnetism. Graz: East-West Publishers.
- Marinov S (1993). Divine Electromagnetism. Graz: East-West Publishers.
