= Oded Aharonson =

Israeli planetary scientist

Oded Aharonson (Hebrew: עודד אהרונסון) is Israeli planetary scientist, professor at Department of Earth and Planetary Sciences, Weizmann Institute. Aharonson was a professor of planetary science at the California Institute of Technology, until he moved in 2012 to the Weizmann Institute in Rehovot, Israel. He has participated in many NASA flight missions, including Mars Global Surveyor, Near Earth Asteroid Rendezvous, the Mars Exploration Rovers, and the Lunar Reconnaissance Orbiter.

Aharonson's research focuses on the geology of planetary surfaces, especially the role of water. He was deputy PI on the science team for Chronos, one of the proposals for the 2011 Mars Scout mission.

== Education ==
- B.S. 1994, Cornell University
- M.Eng. 1995, Cornell University
- Ph.D. 2002, Massachusetts Institute of Technology
