= John Charles Priscu =

Romanian-American scientist

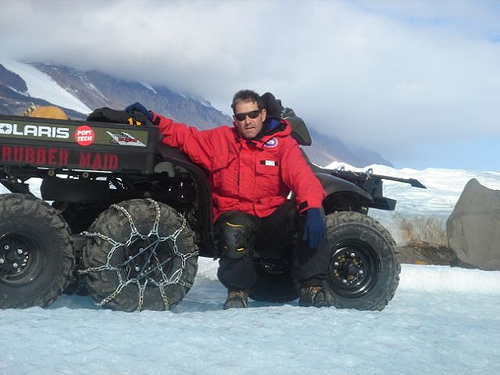
Priscu in Antarctica (2008)

John C. Priscu (Romanian: Prișcu; born 20 September 1952, Las Vegas, Nevada), is a Romanian-American scientist who is the current Professor of Ecology in the Department of Land Resources and Environmental Sciences at Montana State University. He is a principal investigator in the McMurdo Dry Valleys Long Term Ecological Research (LTER) project.

== Filmography/TV appearances ==
He appeared on documentary program Horizon in the episode "The Lost World of Lake Vostok".

== See also ==
- Jill Mikucki
