= Shackleton Energy Company =

American moon mining company

- Company type: Private
- Industry: Aerospace
- Founded: 2007
- Founder: Bill Stone; Dale Tietz; Jim Keravala
- Headquarters: Del Valle, Texas, United States
- Key people: Bill Stone (Chairman); Dale Tietz (CEO); Jim Keravala (COO); Erika Ilves
- Website: shackletonenergy.com

Shackleton Energy Company was a Texas company (2007–mid-2010s) formed to build equipment and technologies necessary for mining the Moon. They failed to secure funding and have met no public milestones.

== History ==
Shackleton was formed in 2007 in Del Valle, Texas to build equipment and technologies necessary for mining the Moon. Shackleton Energy was a subsidiary of Piedra-Sombra Corporation until March 2011, when it was incorporated as an independent C-corporation in the State of Texas.

In November 2011, Shackleton announced an intent to undertake lunar prospecting, but failed to secure funding and met no public milestones. Shackleton began a US$1.2 million crowdfunding campaign in November 2011 for seed funding, working with crowdfunding partner RocketHub. but was unsuccessful and raised less than US$6,000 (0.46%) of the US$1.2 million goal.

== Proposed Project phasing ==
The company planned in 2011 to develop an "industrial astronaut corps" that would select individuals who have many of the characteristics of previous explorers—such as Ernest Shackleton, Edmund Hillary and Lewis and Clark, and stated that they could have humans stationed on the Moon by March 2021.

In the belief that significant reserves of ice would be located, the company had hoped to establish a network of "refueling service stations" in low Earth orbit (LEO) and on the Moon to process and provide fuel and consumables for commercial and government customers. Shackleton planned to use that on-orbit logistics infrastructure to build a fuel-processing operation on the lunar surface and in propellant depots in LEO. Their equipment was stated to be designed to melt the ice and purify the water, "electrolyze the water into gaseous hydrogen and oxygen, and could condense the gases into liquid hydrogen and liquid oxygen and also process them into hydrogen peroxide, all of which could be used as rocket fuels. Should other volatiles like ammonia or methane be discovered, they, too, would be processed into fuel, fertilizer, and other useful products."

They stated that the economics that would make the enterprise potentially profitable are based on the relatively low costs of getting fuels and other consumables from the Moon into low Earth orbit, because "such a haul requires just 1/14th to 1/20th of the fuel it takes to bring material up from Earth."

Shackleton originally planned a phased project through 2020. Their plans were funding dependent on a raise in early 2013. However, funding was not secured. There have been no updates as to their progress.

1. 2012–2014: Systems planning and enterprise planning were to happen .
2. 2014: Robotic precursor missions, lasting two to three years, were projected to begin as early as 2014.
3. 2014 (concurrent): Establish prototyping and engineering infrastructure in LEO to test interchangeable modules.
4. Establish production-scale equipment and transport vehicles, both in LEO and on the surface of the Moon. Once the lunar polar base confirmed and equipment is landed, human teams follow to monitor and operate facility for water ice extraction.

== See also ==
- Asteroid mining
- Exogeology
- Geology of the Moon
- Inspiration Mars Foundation
- Lunar resources
- Lunar water
- Moon Express
- Private spaceflight
- Propellant depot
- Space colonization
