= DEPTHX =

Autonomous underwater vehicle for exploring sinkholes in Mexico

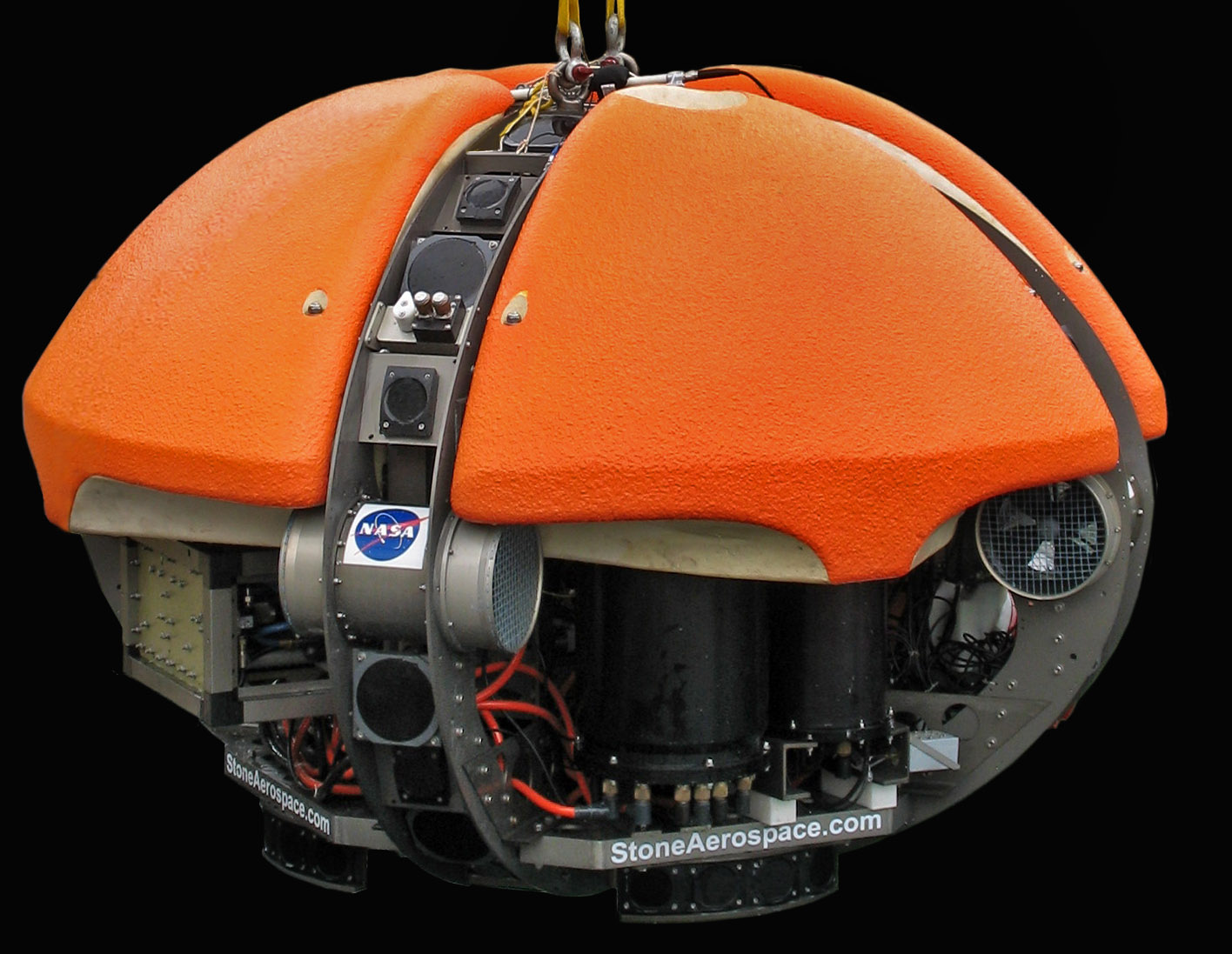
Deep Phreatic Thermal Explorer

The Deep Phreatic Thermal Explorer (DEPTHX) is an autonomous underwater vehicle designed and built by Stone Aerospace, an aerospace engineering firm based in Austin, Texas. It was designed to autonomously explore and map underwater sinkholes in northern Mexico, as well as collect water and wall core samples. This could be achieved via an autonomous form of navigation known as A-Navigation. The DEPTHX vehicle was the first of three vehicles to be built by Stone Aerospace which were funded by NASA with the goal of developing technology that can explore the oceans of Jupiter's moon Europa to look for extraterrestrial life.

DEPTHX was a collaborative project for which Stone Aerospace was the principal investigator. Co-investigators included Carnegie Mellon University, which was responsible for the navigation and guidance software, the Southwest Research Institute, which built the vehicle's science payload, and research scientists from the University of Texas at Austin, the Colorado School of Mines, and NASA Ames Research Center.

== History ==
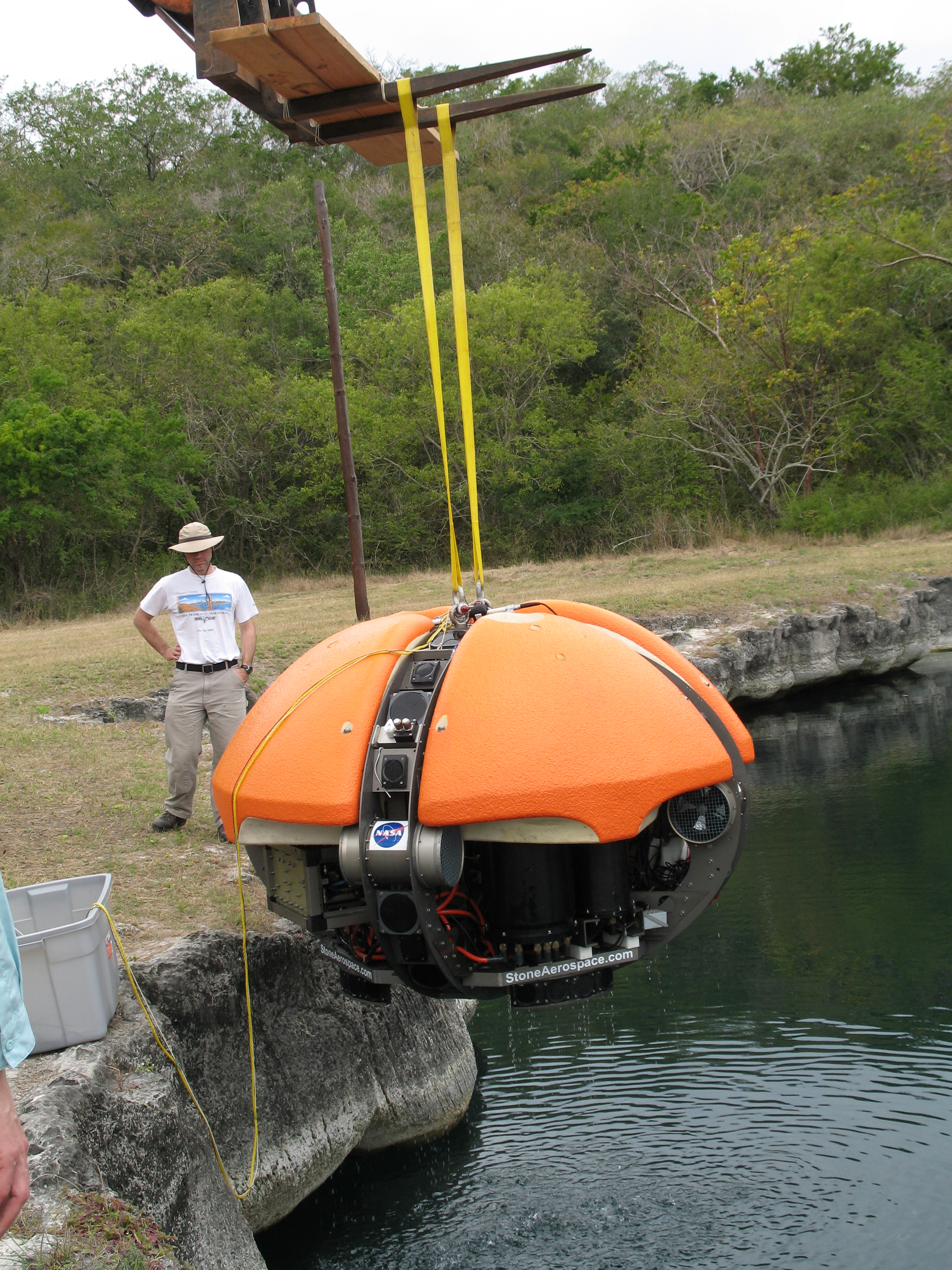
DEPTHX robot being lowered into La Pilita, one of several water-filled sinkholes in Sistema Zacaton (in northeastern Mexico). March 2007.

In 1999, Bill Stone had been involved in an underwater surveying project in Wakulla Springs, Florida. For that project, Stone had devised a digital wall mapper that was propelled by a diver propulsion vehicle and steered by divers which was designed to create a 3-D map of Wakulla Springs using an array of sonars, as well as a suite of other sophisticated sensors. The success of this project, the Wakulla Springs 2 Project, attracted the interest of planetary scientist Dan Durda from the Southwest Research Institute, who wished to create a similar piece of technology to explore the oceans of Europa, but one that could drive itself autonomously. Stone accepted the challenge, and several collaborative proposals were submitted to NASA. It wasn't until 2003 that NASA would finally fund DEPTHX as a three-year, $5 million project.

The vehicle underwent several different design concepts over the next couple of years as engineers at Stone Aerospace explored various options. Initial designs focused on a less ellipsoidal design, however these designs were abandoned due to concerns that such a shape would be difficult to maneuver out of the potentially tight spots it might encounter during the exploration of unknown territory. It was also during this time that the DEPTHX team did a field campaign at Cenote Zacatón using a drop sonde to acquire some initial data for the software team, which itself contributed to the overall design changes. The final design was decided upon in 2006, at which point construction of the vehicle began.

The completed vehicle was about 7 feet (2.1 m) in diameter and weighed about 3,300 pounds (1,500 kg). It had redundant navigation systems including 54 sonars, an inertial measurement unit, doppler velocity logger, as well as depth gauges and accelerometers. Propulsion systems were also redundant, having six thrusters and two equivalent battery stacks. It was outfitted with a variable buoyancy system, and finally with the science payload that included the ability to take in water and solid core samples for later analysis, as well as an onboard microscope to analyze water samples in real time.

== Accomplishments ==
During the DEPTHX 2007 deployment, the vehicle was able to create 3-D maps of four cenotes in Sistema Zacatón in Tamaulipas, Mexico. This was the first autonomous system to explore and map a cavern. The mapping of Cenote Zacatón was particularly notable because its depth was previously unknown, as human divers had not been successful in attempts to reach the bottom. DEPTHX created the first map of the bottom of Zacatón, which has a depth of over 1,000 feet [300 m]. DEPTHX was the first robotic system of any kind to implement three-dimensional simultaneous localization and mapping (SLAM). It was also the first such system to make its own decisions on where and how to collect samples. From these samples, at least three new divisions of bacteria were discovered.

The success of the DEPTHX mission led to the funding of the follow-on project, ENDURANCE. The ENDURANCE vehicle reused the frame and a number of systems from the DEPTHX vehicle, but was considerably reconfigured for the needs of the Antarctic environment.

== Fieldwork timeline ==
- January 25–27, 2007 - The DEPTHX Team begins surveying the world's deepest water-filled sinkhole, Cenote Zacatón.
- February 4–10, 2007 - Field operations at la Pilita, one of the sinkholes in Sistema Zacatón. DEPTHX runs long autonomous missions to map the area and collect scientific data.
- March 2007 - Field work continues in La Pilita.
- May 2007 - DEPTHX is lowered into Zacatón for the first time and maps the bottom for the first time. Three-dimensional SLAM technology is demonstrated, microbiological samples are collected, and autonomous operation demonstrated.

== See also ==
- Autonomous underwater vehicle – Uncrewed underwater vehicle with autonomous guidance system
- BRUIE – Autonomous underwater vehicle
- Cryobot – Autonomous ice penetrator vehicle
- ENDURANCE – Autonomous underwater vehicle
- IceMole – Autonomous ice penetrator vehicle
- Radioisotope thermoelectric generator – Electrical generator that uses heat from radioactive decay
