= IceMole =

Autonomous ice penetrator vehicle

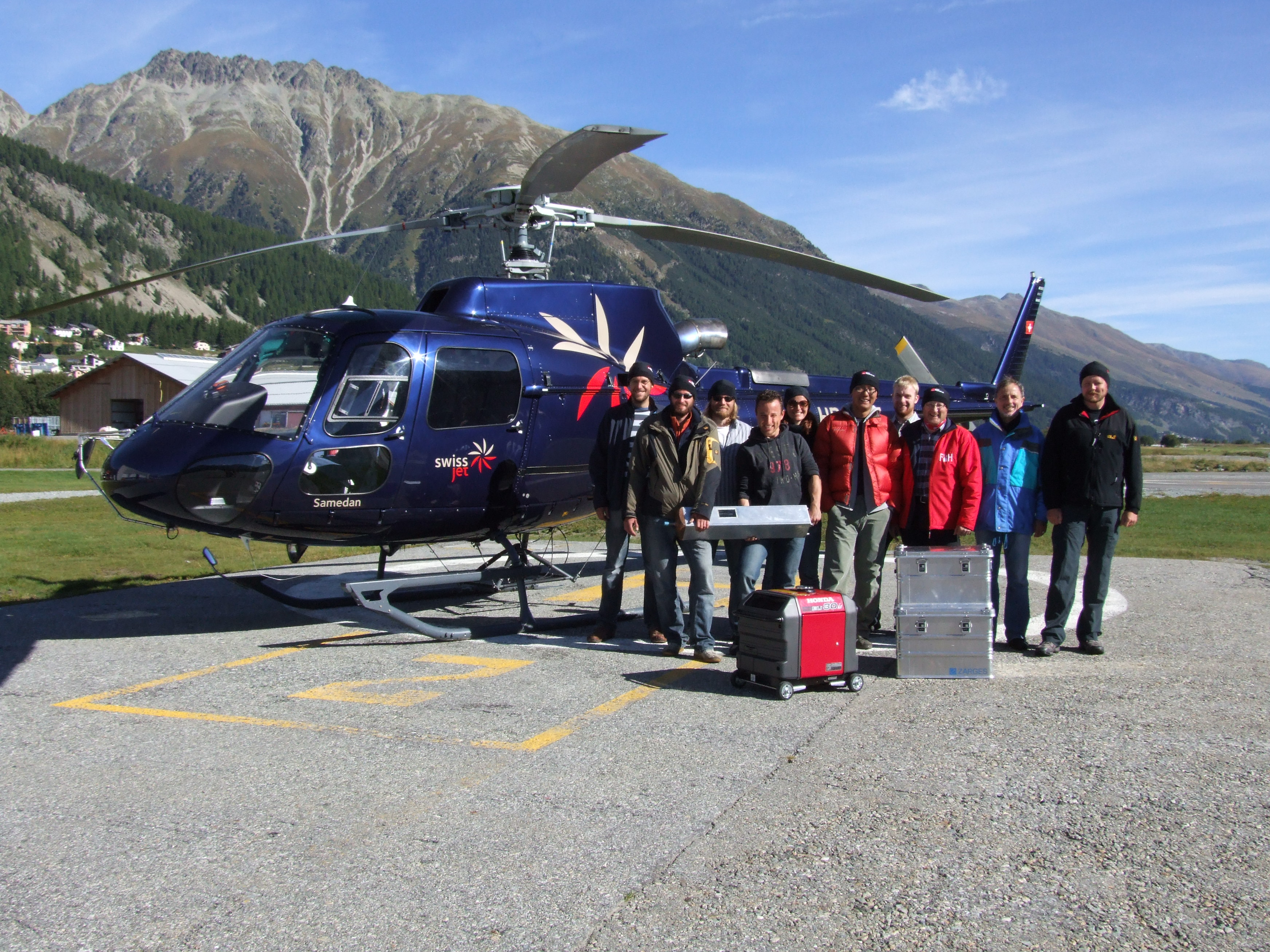
The IceMole-Team at the airport Pontresina (Field experiment on the Morteratsch Glacier, Switzerland 2010)

IceMole is an autonomous ice research probe, incorporating a new type of ice-melting tip for the exploration of polar regions, glaciers, ice sheets, and extraterrestrial regions, developed by a team from the FH Aachen, a Fachhochschule (university of applied sciences) in Aachen, Germany. The advantage over previous probes is that the IceMole can change its direction and can be recovered after being used. A driving ice screw allows the probe to drill through soil layers and other contaminations in the ice.

== History ==
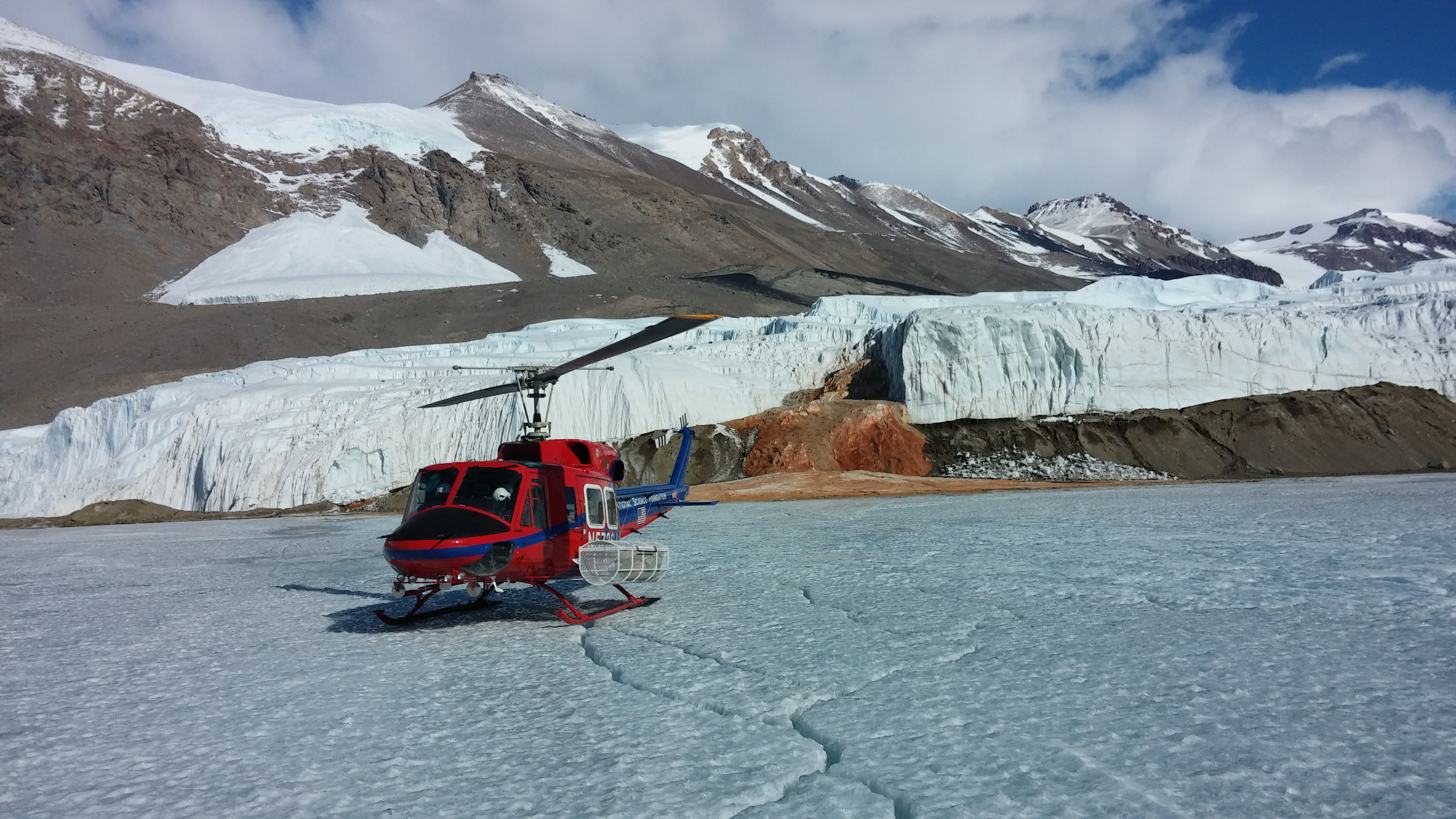
A NSF helicopter from McMurdo Station transports an IceMole expedition to a glacier

The IceMole is being developed using rapid prototyping. As of April 2011, the probe is in its first prototype and it has been designed to carry out the subsurface investigation of terrestrial glaciers and ice sheets. It is planned that future versions of the probe would be suitably adapted for extraterrestrial ice research, e.g. on the polar caps of Mars, Jupiter's moon Europa, or Saturn's moon Enceladus.

The robot resulted from a student project at the Fachbereich Luft- und Raumfahrttechnik (Faculty of Aerospace Engineering) at the FH Aachen, led by Prof. Dr. Bernd Dachwald. The excavation is carried out by both drilling and melting of the ice. In a clean ice core, the probe can analyze the surrounding ice with measuring instruments. While drilling, the surrounding ice is not biologically contaminated.

As of 2011, the project objectives are given as:

Objectives:

- Terrestrial applications
  - In 2–3 years: in glaciers and ice sheets
  - In 4–6 years: In the ice and the subglacial lakes in Antarctica
- Extra Terrestrial applications
  - In 10–15 years: On the polar caps of Mars
  - In 20–30 years: On Jupiter's moon Europa, on Saturn's moon Enceladus

The project requirements also emphasised the need for maximum reliability, robustness, mobility, environmental security and autonomy.

== IceMole 1 ==
Heated tips in probes have been employed since the 1960s but the probes could only drill straight down, could not be recovered from deep intrusions and were halted by buildup of dirt and sediment, which would not permit heat transfer. To overcome these problems, the IceMole combines a screw with a melting tip.

The first prototype IceMole is a pencil-shaped craft that is designed to autonomously deploy and dig itself into ice. It is a square tube of 225 cm^{2} (34.9 sq in) cross section. It has a 3 kW (4.0 hp) melting head at the tip which has differential heating in different parts. The robot is powered by a power generator on the surface and is attached by means of a cable, which relays the power supply, communication and data signals. The IceMole utilizes a 6 cm (2.4 in) long screw at its heated head that keeps firm contact while drilling with the ice being melted. The IceMole has separately controllable heating elements that can be manipulated to obtain differential heating. The differential heating permits the gradual change of direction.

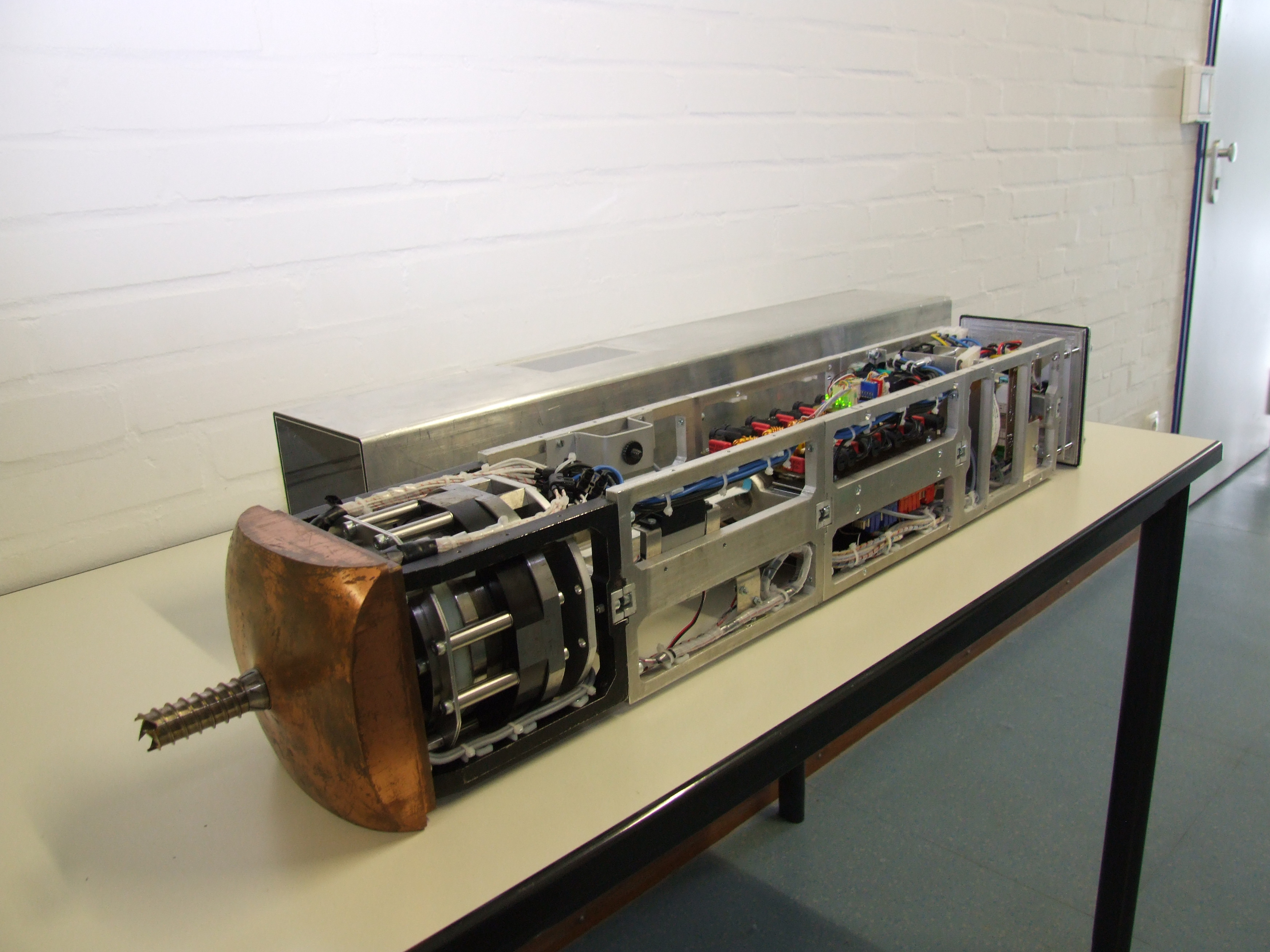
Interior view of the melting probe IceMole1

The ice screw is located at the tip of the melting head and generates a driving force that presses the melting head against the ice. This enables the IceMole to penetrate soil and mud and also leads to a good conductive heat transfer when in contact with the ice. The thermally isolated ice screw transfers ice into the probe, where it can be analyzed in situ. It is planned that instruments will be fitted in the probe that will analyse the ice and send only the results to the surface.

The technical specifications of IceMole1 are given below :

Specifications IceMole1:

- Melting velocity: max. 0.3 m (1 ft 0 in)/hour
- Heating elements: 4 × melting head
- Performance heating elements: the 2,200 W (3.0 hp)
- Average thermal power: 1,000 W (1.3 hp)
- Drive motor power: 25 W (0.034 hp)
- Weight: 30 kg (66 lb)
- External dimensions: 150 mm (5.9 in) x 150 mm (5.9 in) x 870 mm (34 in)
- Payload: on-board digital camera

The IceMole team has developed the vehicle without a specific payload in mind. The vehicle has an inner chamber in which sensors and other instruments may be housed. In its recent tests, the IceMole carried an off-the-shelf camera. The team is also designing a fluorescence biosensor detector that could search for organic molecules in the ice.

== IceMole 2 ==
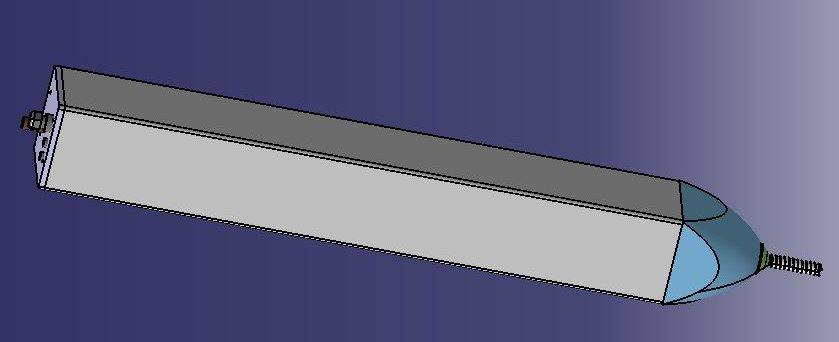
Exterior view of the new design IceMole2

Since October 2010, the IceMole team is working on a redesign of the first IceMole. The Improvements are, amongst others, the optimization of the melting head and a completely newly developed gear. The new melting head has 12 separately controlled heating elements. These 12 cartridge heaters are arranged in a ring inside of the melting head. In addition, it has 2 wall heaters on each side in the rear of the probe. With this addition, the IceMole2 maneuverability improves over that of its predecessor. The new gear has been specially developed for this probe. Thus, the transmission has a higher efficiency and is more lightweight. It is planned to test IceMole2 in the summer of 2012.

The planned technical specifications of IceMole2:

Specifications IceMole2:

- Melting velocity: max. 1 m (3 ft 3 in)/hour
- Heating elements: 12 × melting head, 2x each side wall
- Heating Power head: max. 2,400 W (3.2 hp)
- Heating Power each side wall: max. 600 W (0.80 hp)
- Drive motor power: 25 W (0.034 hp)
- Weight: 25 kg (55 lb)
- External dimensions: 150 mm (5.9 in) x 150 mm (5.9 in) x 1,200 mm (47 in)
- Payload: fluorescence biosensor

The probe has also been designed to drag a series of containers containing sensors which can be jettisoned on command and deployed permanently in specific locations in the ice. The team hopes to eventually work with other researchers that would use IceMole to drop sensors deep in icy environments. While the power supply for the first field trials on a glacier was provided by an external power generator on the surface, it is also planned that the heating power be provided by an on-board power source.

== Trials ==
The first field trials were carried out in the area of the Morteratsch Glacier in Switzerland during the summer of 2010. During the trials on the glacier, the following penetration tests have been successfully performed:

- melting 45° upwards for 1.5 m (4 ft 11 in) against gravity;
- melting horizontally for 5 m (16 ft);
- melting 45° downwards for 3 m (9.8 ft), thereby penetrating three obstructing non-ice layers (mud and sand found on the glacier) and driving a curve with a radius of 10 m (33 ft).
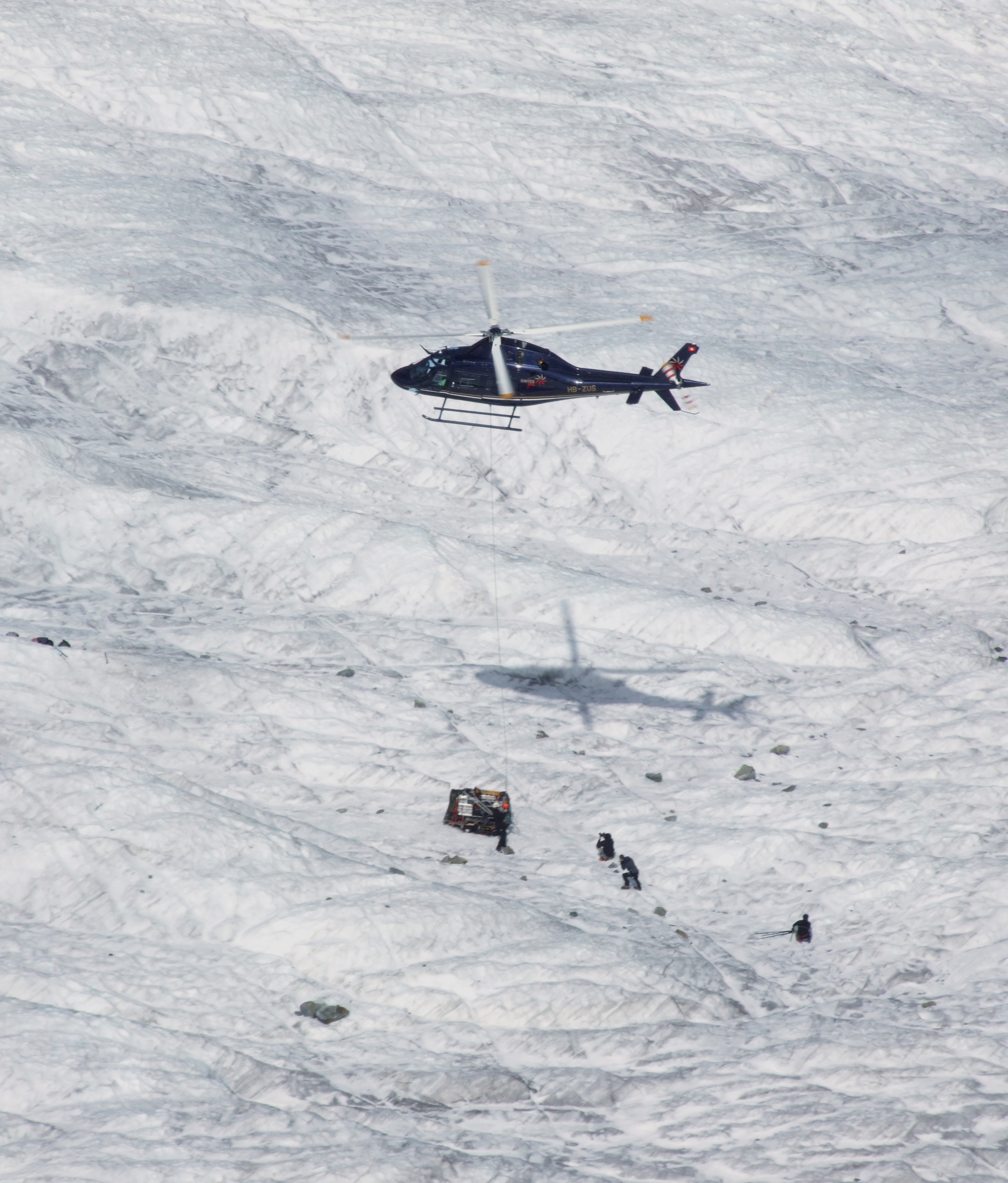
Transport of the equipment to the Morteratsch Glacier by a helicopter

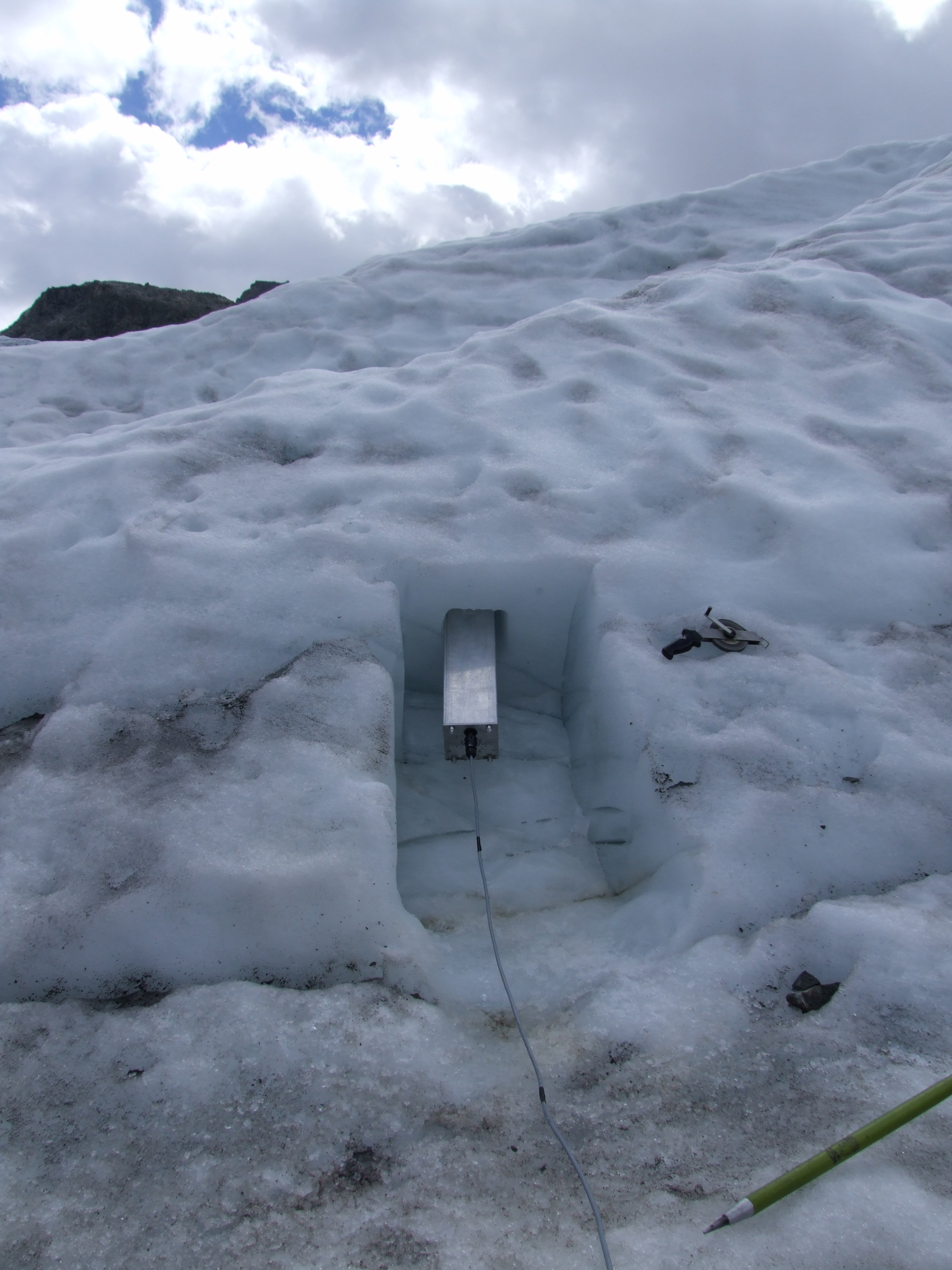
IceMole moves 45° upwards against gravity.

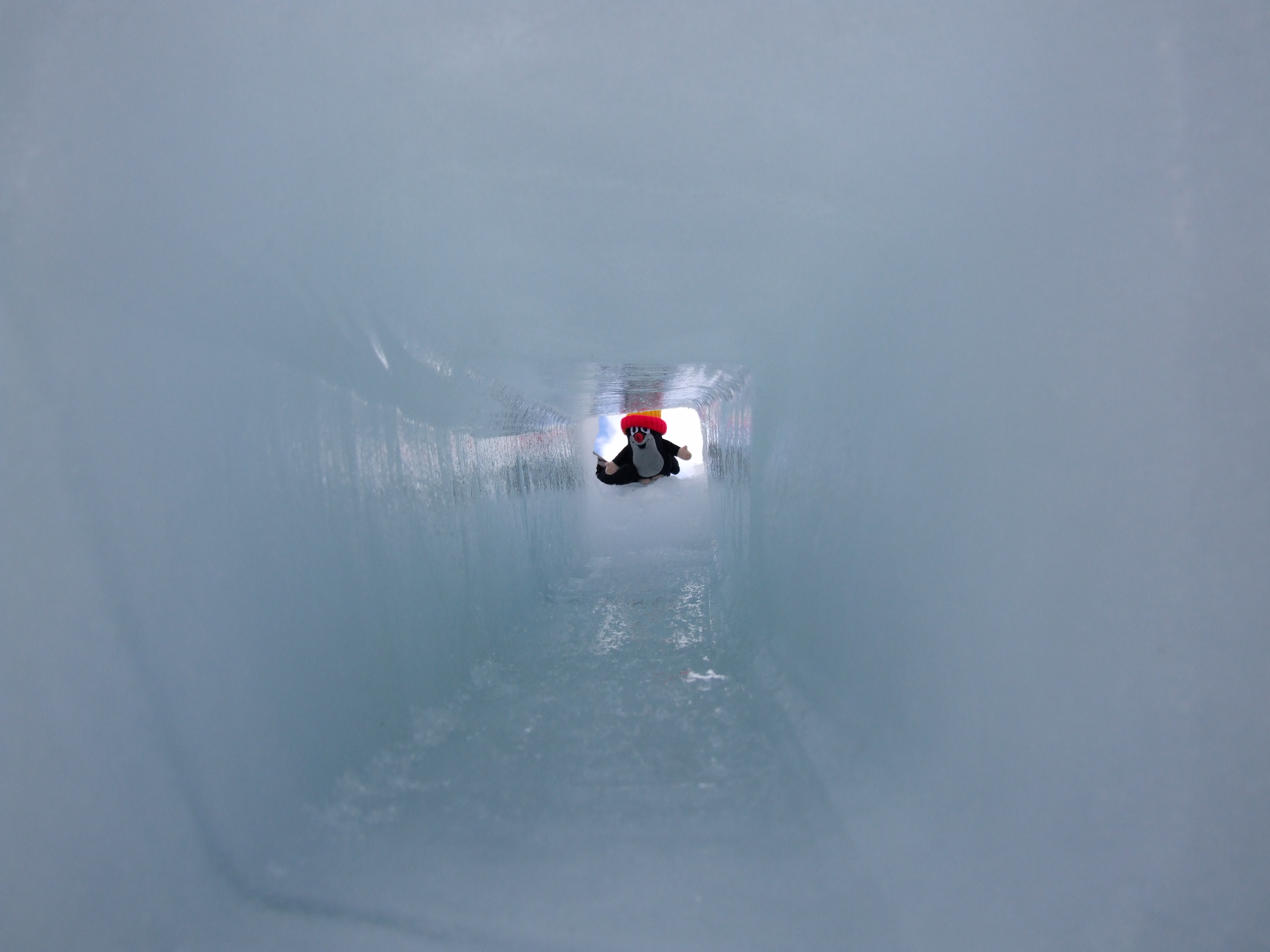
The melting channel seen aligned upwards

While IceMole moved at a leisurely 30 cm (12 in) per hour during its first trial run, optimal conditions could allow the craft to progress at more than three times that speed. The penetration speed will be increased for the next prototype.

The test results show that the IceMole concept is a viable approach to deliver scientific instruments into deep ice and to recover them afterwards. Another advantage of the IceMole with respect to drilling is that biological contamination can be minimized and the process can be made highly autonomous, so that there is no need for an operator on the surface.

The results were reported at the 2011 Antarctic Science Symposium in Madison, Wisconsin and the European Geosciences Union 2011 held at Vienna, Austria. The next trial run was scheduled to be held in the Northern Hemisphere summer of 2012.

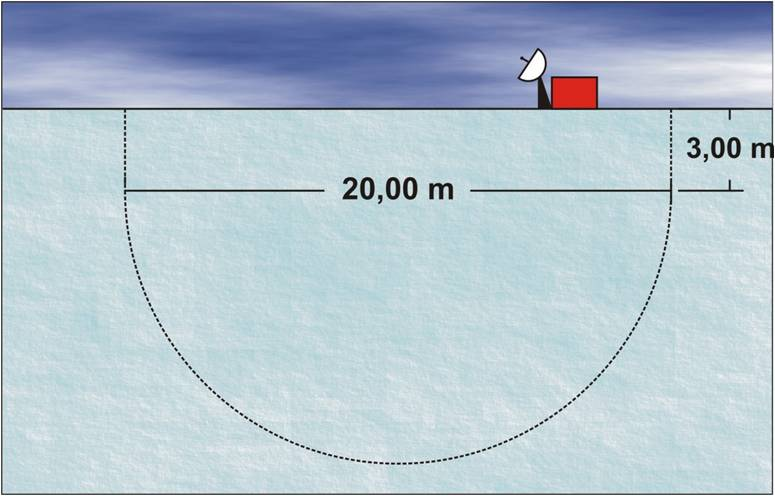
Mission scenario for 2012: Dig a vertical "U"

The planned objectives for the field experiment in 2012 are given below.

Mission Profile 2012:
1.)To demonstrate the recoverability of IceMole and its payloads
2.)To dig a horizontal "U"
3.)To dig a vertical "U"
4.)To travel distance of ~ 40 m
5) To function for durations of 50 - 150 hours
6) To undock tether containers

=== Blood Falls test ===
Blood Falls was used as the target for testing IceMole in November 2014. This unusual flow of melt water from below the glacier gives scientists access to an environment they could otherwise only explore by drilling (which would also risk contaminating it). Its source is a subglacial pool, of unknown size, which sometimes overflows. Biogeochemical analysis shows that the water is marine in source originally. One hypothesis is that its source may be the remains of an ancient fjord that occupied the Taylor valley in the tertiary period. The ferrous iron dissolved in the water oxidizes as the water reaches the surface, turning the water blood red.

The test returned a clean subglacial sample from the outflow channel from Blood Falls.

Subglacial environments in Antarctica need similar protection protocols to interplanetary missions, and the probe was sterilized to these protocols using hydrogen peroxide and UV sterilization. Also, only the tip of the probe sampled the liquid water directly.

== See also ==
- Autonomous underwater vehicle – Uncrewed underwater vehicle with autonomous guidance system
- BRUIE – Autonomous underwater vehicle
- Cryobot – Autonomous ice penetrator vehicle
- DEPTHX – Autonomous underwater vehicle for exploring sinkholes in Mexico
- Radioisotope thermoelectric generator – Electrical generator that uses heat from radioactive decay
