= Astrobiology Magazine =

Former NASA-sponsored popular science magazine

- Astrobiology Magazine cover
- Categories: Interdisciplinary
- Publisher: NASA
- Founded: 1999; 27 years ago
- Final issue: 2018
- Country: United States
- Website: www.astrobio.net
- ISSN: 2152-1239
- OCLC: 463618902

Astrobiology Magazine (Exploring the Solar System and Beyond), or Astrobiology Mag, was an American, formerly NASA-sponsored, international online popular science magazine that contained popular science content, which referred to articles for the general reader on science and technology subjects. The magazine reported on missions of NASA and other space agencies, as well as present news of relevant research conducted by various institutions, universities, and non-profit groups. In addition, the magazine provided a forum through which researchers and the general public could oversee the progress made in fields of study that were associated with the science of astrobiology. The magazine was created by Helen Matsos, who was the chief editor and executive producer. It began publication in 1999 and, as of July 2021, is now defunct.

== See also ==
- Abiogenesis
- Earliest known life forms

Periodicals

- Astrobiology journal
- Astronomy
- BBC Sky at Night
- Discover
- National Geographic
- Popular Science
- Scientific American
- Sky & Telescope
