= Central European =

Central European may mean:

- A person of one of a Central European ethnic group
- Relating to or characteristic of Central Europe or its inhabitants

== Culture ==
- Central European cuisine, cuisine typical to Central Europe
- Central European University, a graduate-level, English-language university promoting a distinctively Central European perspective
- Central European University Press
- Central European Free Trade Agreement, a free trade area established by central European countries
- Central European Initiative, a forum of regional cooperation
- Central European Media Enterprises, a Bermuda-based media and entertainment company
- Serbian Orthodox Eparchy of Central Europe, former name of the Serbian Orthodox Eparchy of Frankfurt and all of Germany
- Central European History, a peer-reviewed academic journal on history published quarterly by Cambridge University Press
- Central European Time, time zone used in most parts of the European Union

== History ==
- Urnfield culture (c. 1300 BC – 750 BC), a late Bronze Age culture of Central Europe
- Lusatian culture (1300 BCE – 500 BCE), a late Bronze Age and early Iron Age in Central Europe
- Hallstatt culture, the predominant Central European culture from the 8th to 6th centuries BC
- Central Europe Campaign, Western Allied invasion of Germany

== Sport ==
- Central European Football League, a regional American football league
- Central European Tour Budapest GP, a cycling race in Hungary
- Central European Tour Miskolc GP, is a cycling race in Hungary
- Central European International Cup, an international football competition held by certain national teams from Central Europe between 1927 and 1960
- 2008 Central Europe Rally, a rally raid endurance race held in Romania and Hungary
- 2023 Central Europe Rally, a rally race held in Germany, Austria and Czech Republic
- Ladies Central European Open, a women's professional golf tournament on the Ladies European Tour
- Mitropa Cup, officially called the La Coupe de l'Europe Centrale, was one of the first international major European football cups for club sides

== See also ==
- European Union, a European supranational entity (federation)
- Europe (disambiguation)
- EU (disambiguation)
- Euro (disambiguation)
