= Eus (disambiguation) =

EUS, eus, and, variants, may refer to:

== Places ==
- Eus, a commune in France
- Euston railway station (station code EUS), London, England, UK

== Groups, organizations ==
- Edinburgh University Settlement, a defunct British charity
- Engineering Undergraduate Society of the University of British Columbia, Canada
- Estonian Students' Society (EÜS; Estonian: Eesti Üliõpilaste Selts)
- Euskaltel–Euskadi (1994–2013) (UCI team code EUS), a professional road cycling team

== Medical, biology, anatomy ==
- Endoscopic ultrasound
- Epizootic ulcerative syndrome
- External urethral sphincter, a subset of the muscles engaged in urethral sphincter functionality

== Other uses ==
- .eus, the Internet top-level domain for the Basque language
- Basque language (Euskara), having the ISO 639 language code eus
- Europium(II) sulfide (empirical chemical formula EuS)
- Exploration Upper Stage, a proposed 2nd stage for US's Space Launch System block 1B rocket
- Extended Update Support, a release channel for Red Hat Enterprise Linux

== See also ==
- EUSES
- EUSS
- EVS (disambiguation)
- EWS (disambiguation)
- EU (disambiguation) for the singular of EUs
