= EU (disambiguation) =

EU is the European Union, a political and economic union of 27 member states primarily located in Europe.

Eu or eu may also refer to:

== Arts and entertainment ==
- Entropia Universe, a virtual universe
- EU (band), a Russian electronic band
- Europa Universalis, a computer game series
- E.U. (TV series), a Hong Kong television show
- Experience Unlimited, an American go-go band
- Star Wars Expanded Universe
- Detective Comics Extended Universe
- E:U, rapper and member of South Korean girl group Everglow
- Energon Universe

== Businesses and organizations ==
- Ecuatoriana de Aviación (IATA code), national airline of Ecuador
- Ephraim Union, a regional political party in the Indian state of Mizoram
- European Union (resistance group), in Germany during World War II
- Sydney University Evangelical Union, a large Christian student group
- Ecological Uprising (Ekološki ustanak), a political party in Serbia

=== Universities and colleges ===
- Edinburgh University, Scotland
- Ehime University, Matsuyama, Ehime, Japan
- Eastern University (United States), Pennsylvania
- Elon University, North Carolina, US
- Elmhurst University, Elmhurst, Illinois, US
- Emory University, Atlanta, US

== Language ==
- Eu (digraph)
- eu, the ISO 639 alpha-2 language code for the Basque language

== Places ==
- Europa Island (FIPS PUB 10-4 territory code)
- Eu, Seine-Maritime, a town in France, site of the Château d'Eu

== Science and technology ==
- .eu, a country code top-level domain for the European Union
- Europa Universalis, a strategy video game
- Endotoxin unit, a measure of endotoxin levels
- Entropy unit, a non-S.I. unit of entropy that is equal to one calorie per Kelvin
- Euler number, a dimensionless quantity in fluid mechanics
- Europinidin, an anthocyanidin
- Europium (symbol Eu), a chemical element
- Execution unit, a part of a CPU
- "eu" (meaning "good" or "well" in Ancient Greek), often used as a prefix in scientific terms, particularly in taxonomy

== Other uses ==
- Emergency Unit, of the Hong Kong Police Force

== See also ==
- Europe, a continent
- Euro (EUR), a currency
- United States (French: États-Unis, Spanish: Estados Unidos, Portuguese: Estados Unidos)
- EUR (disambiguation)
- Euro (disambiguation)
- Europe (disambiguation)
- EV (disambiguation)
- EW (disambiguation)
- UE (disambiguation)
- EUS (disambiguation)
