= EV100 =

EV100, EV-100 or EV_{100} may refer to:

- The EV-100 serotype of the enterovirus
- EV_{100} - exposure value for ISO 100 film speed
- EV100 - an electric car produced by the Chinese company JMEV

== See also ==
- EV (disambiguation)
