= Tasos Dimoschakis =

- Τάσος Δημοσχάκης

Member of the Hellenic Parliament
- Incumbent
- Assumed office 25 January 2015
- Constituency: Evros

Chief of the Hellenic Police
- In office 28 February 2006 – 26 February 2008
- Prime Minister: Kostas Karamanlis
- Preceded by: Georgios Angelakos
- Succeeded by: Vassilios Tsiatouras

Personal details
- Born: November 19, 1955 (age 70) Isaakio, Evros, Greece
- Party: New Democracy
- Spouse: Maria Vlachouli
- Children: 2 (including Zoi Dimoschaki)
- Education: Officers School of the Hellenic Police; Hellenic National Defence College (SETHA)
- Profession: Retired Police General
- Website: dimoschakis.gr

Anastasios "Tasos" Dimoschakis (Greek: Αναστάσιος "Τάσος" Δημοσχάκης); born 19 November 1955) is a Greek politician and retired Hellenic Police general who has been serving as a Member of the Hellenic Parliament for Evros representing New Democracy since January 2015.

He previously served as the Chief of the Hellenic Police from 2006 to 2008.

== Early life and education ==
Dimoschakis was born on 19 November 1955 in the village of Isaakio, near Didymoteicho, in the Evros regional unit.

From 1974 to 1977, he attended the Officers School of the former Hellenic Gendarmerie. He later graduated from the Hellenic Police Foreign Languages School (French department) and the Hellenic Army Foreign Languages School. In the 1996–1997 academic year, he completed postgraduate military studies at the Hellenic National Defence College (SETHA).

He also underwent specialized police training in Germany, the United Kingdom, and the United States, focusing on crisis management, state security, public order, and traffic safety.

== Police career ==
Dimoschakis served in various operational and command positions within the Hellenic Police. During the 2004 Summer Olympics and 2004 Summer Paralympics in Athens, as a Major General and Chief of Staff of the Police Headquarters, he had operational responsibility for the security of the Opening and Closing Ceremonies as well as open-road athletic events.

On 28 February 2006, the Government Council for Foreign Affairs and Defence (KYSEA) appointed him Chief of the Hellenic Police. He held the position until his retirement on 26 February 2008, when he was promoted to the rank of full Police General and conferred the title of Honorary Chief of the Hellenic Police.

== Political career ==
Following his police career, Dimoschakis joined New Democracy's policy formulation team (2010–2012), focusing on public order and citizen protection.

In the 2014 European Parliament elections, he stood as a candidate for New Democracy, receiving approximately 72,000 votes.

He was elected to the Hellenic Parliament representing the Evros constituency in the January 2015 election and was re-elected in September 2015, July 2019, and June 2023.

During his parliamentary tenure, he served as Deputy Shadow Minister for National Defence (2016–2019) and vice-chair of the Standing Committee on National Defence and Foreign Affairs (2019–2023). In February 2026, he was appointed Deputy Secretary of the New Democracy Parliamentary Group with responsibility for Foreign Affairs and National Defence. He serves as a member of the Standing Committee on National Defence and Foreign Affairs and the Standing Committee on Public Administration, Public Order and Justice.

== Personal life ==
Dimoschakis is married to Maria Vlachouli, a Ministry of Finance official. They have two children and six grandchildren. His daughter, Zoi Dimoschaki, is a retired competitive swimmer who competed in the 2000 Summer Olympics and 2004 Summer Olympics and recited the Athletes' Oath during the Opening Ceremony of the 2004 Athens Games.

He is the nephew of Fanis Dimoschakis (1944–2024), who was also a New Democracy MP for Evros.

He speaks Greek, English and French.
