= Euros (disambiguation) =

The euro (plural euros) is the official currency of the European Union.

Euros may also refer to

- Euros (moth)
- UEFA European Championship, football tournament informally known as the Euros
- Eurus or Euros, one of the Anemoi (the Greek deities representing wind)

== People with the given name ==
- Euros Bowen (1904–1988), Welsh language poet and priest
- Euros Lyn (born 1971), Welsh television director
- Euros Childs (born 1975), Welsh musician and songwriter

== See also ==
- Euro (disambiguation)
- Evros (disambiguation)
