= EV-1 =

EV-1 or ev1 or variation, may refer to:

== Automobiles ==
- General Motors EV1, an electric car introduced in 1996 and discontinued in 1999
- Saab EV-1, developed by Saab in 1985 as a future design study
- Kawei EV1, a Chinese electric SUV
- Daihatsu EV1, a concept car for the 1973 Tokyo Motor Show

== Other uses ==
- EV1 The Atlantic Coast Route, a long-distance cycling route in Europe
- EV1 Servers, an Internet hosting service
- NOTS-EV-1 Pilot, the EV-1 model called Pilot from NOTS, a missile and launch vehicle rocket
- Extra-vehicular (no.), a NASA designation for spacewalkers (EV-1 is one of four designations)

== See also ==
- EV (disambiguation)
- EVI (disambiguation)
- EVL (disambiguation)
