= Lusatian culture =

Archaeological culture of Central Europe

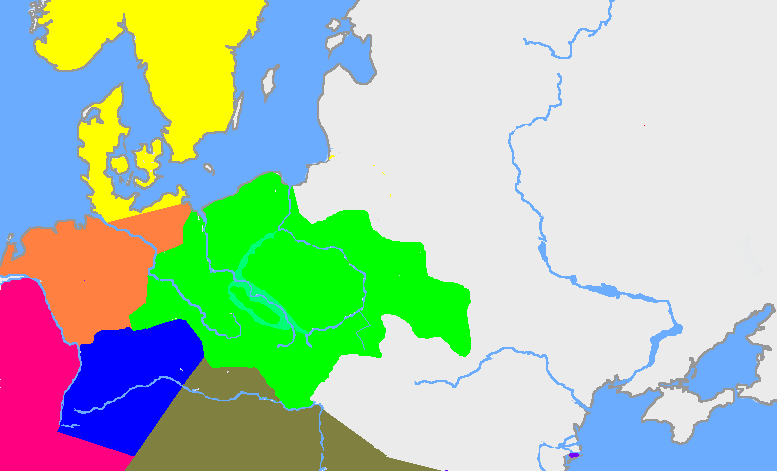
- 1200 BC: Lusatian culture(green), Knovíz culture (blue), Danubian cultures (olive), Northern Urnfield (orange), Southern Urnfield (red), Nordic Bronze Age (yellow)
- Alternative names: Lausitz culture
- Geographical range: Central Europe
- Period: Late Bronze Age to early Iron Age
- Dates: c. 1200–500 BC
- Preceded by: Trzciniec culture, Tumulus culture, Nordic Bronze Age, Urnfield culture
- Followed by: Pomeranian culture, Cimmerians

The Lusatian culture existed in the later Bronze Age and early Iron Age (1300–500 BC) in most of what is now Poland and parts of what are now the Czech Republic, Slovakia, eastern Germany and western Ukraine. It covers the Periods Montelius III (early Lusatian culture) to V of the Northern European chronological scheme. It has been associated or closely linked with the Nordic Bronze Age. Hallstatt influences can also be seen particularly in ornaments (fibulae, pins) and weapons.

== Origins ==
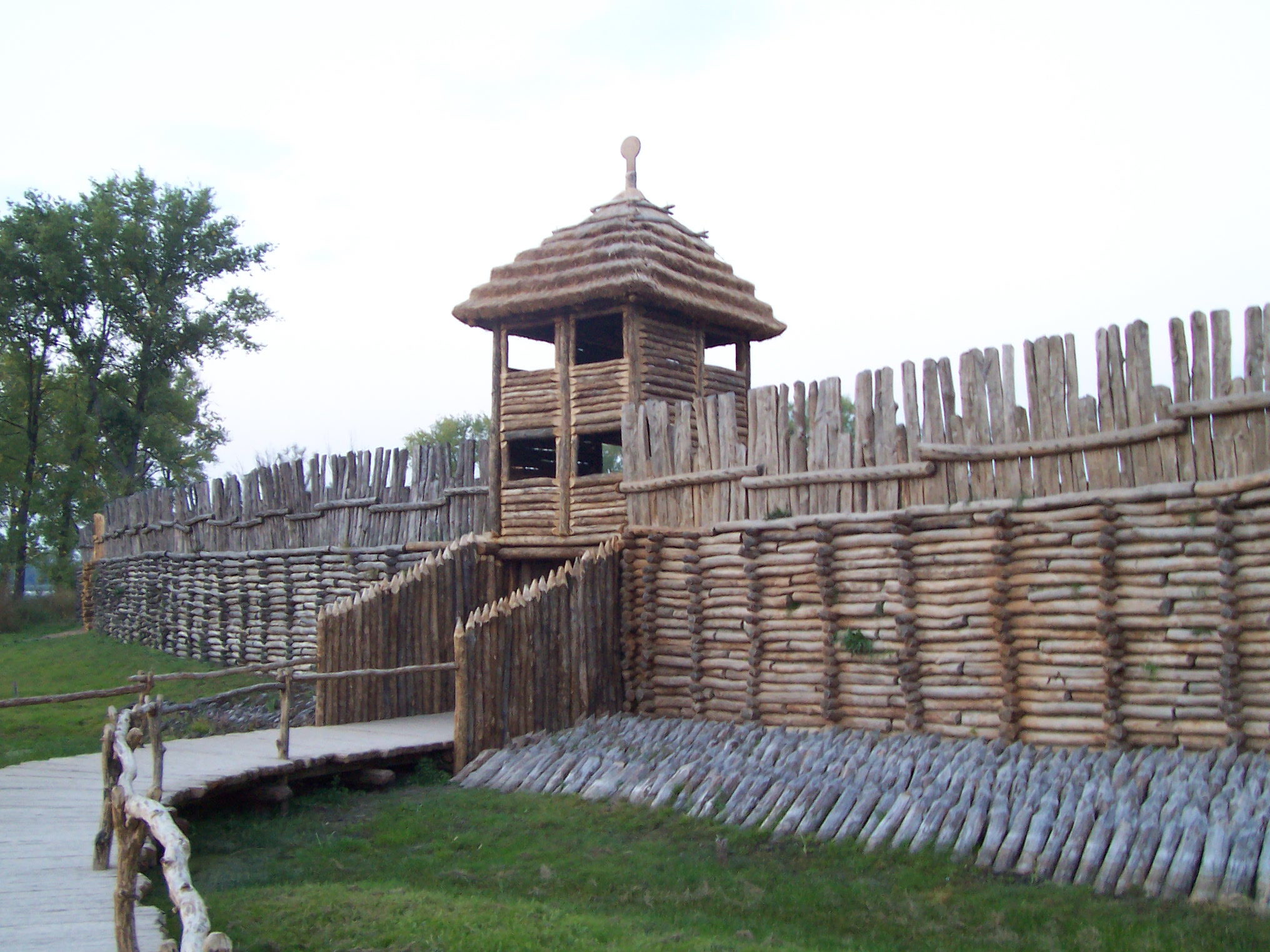
Reconstructed Biskupin (Poland)

The Lusatian culture developed as the preceding Trzciniec culture experienced influences from the Tumulus culture of the Middle Bronze Age, essentially incorporating the local communities into the socio-political network of Iron Age Europe. It formed part of the Urnfield systems, origin of the Celts and Italic peoples, including the Romans, found from eastern France, southern Germany and Austria, to Hungary and the Nordic Bronze Age in northwestern Germany and Scandinavia. It was followed by the Billendorf culture of the Early Iron Age to the west. In the area that is now modern-day Poland, the Lusatian culture was succeeded by the Pomeranian culture.

Lusatian-type burials were first described by the German pathologist and archaeologist Rudolf Virchow (1821–1902). The name refers to the Lusatia area in eastern Germany (Brandenburg and Saxony) and western Poland.

Early German scholars, particularly those influenced by Gustaf Kossinna's settlement archaeology approach, sometimes interpreted the culture as an early Germanic one. Virchow himself identified the pottery artifacts as "pre-Germanic", but did not speculate on the ethnicity of their makers.

The Tollense valley battlefield (c. 1250 BC), located in a border zone with Nordic Bronze Age and Urnfield influences, shows evidence of mixed warrior groups with diverse material culture and genetic profiles, but does not resolve the broader ethnic or linguistic affiliation of the Lusatian complex.

The Polish archeologist Józef Kostrzewski, who started extensive excavations of the Lusatian settlement of Biskupin in 1934, hypothesised that the Lusatian culture was a forerunner of later cultures belonging to the early Slavs. Modern archeologists, such as both Kazimierz Godłowski and Piotr Kaczanowski, hold the view that the ethnic geography of Bronze Age Central Europe then included peoples whose languages and ethnic identity are simply unknown.

== Culture ==
Burial was by cremation; inhumations are rare. The urn is usually accompanied by numerous (up to 40) secondary vessels. Metal grave gifts are sparse, but there are numerous hoards (such as Kopaniewo, Pomerania) that contain rich metalwork, both bronze and gold (hoard of Eberswalde, Brandenburg). Graves containing moulds (like at Bataune, in Saxony) and tuyeres attest to the production of bronze tools and weapons at the village level. The "royal" tomb of Seddin, Brandenburg, Germany, covered by a large earthen barrow, contained Mediterranean imports like bronze vessels and glass beads. Cemeteries can be quite large and contain thousands of graves.

Well-known settlements include Biskupin, in Poland, and Buch, near Berlin. There are both open villages and fortified settlements (burgwall or gord) on hilltops or in swampy areas. The ramparts were constructed of wooden boxes filled with soil or stones.

Its economy was mainly based on arable agriculture, as is attested by numerous storage pits. Emmer wheat and six-row barley formed the basic crops, together with millet, rye and oats, peas, broad beans, lentils, and gold of pleasure (Camelina sativa). Flax was grown, and remains of domesticated apples, pears, and plums have been found. Cattle and pigs were the most important domestic animals, followed by sheep, goats, horses, and dogs. Pictures on Iron Age urns from Silesia attest horse riding, but horses were used to draw chariots as well. Hunting was practiced, as bones of red and roe deer, boar, European bison, elk, hare, fox, and wolf attest, but it did not provide much of the meat consumed. The numerous frog bones found at Biskupin may indicate that frogs' legs were eaten as well.

== Gallery ==
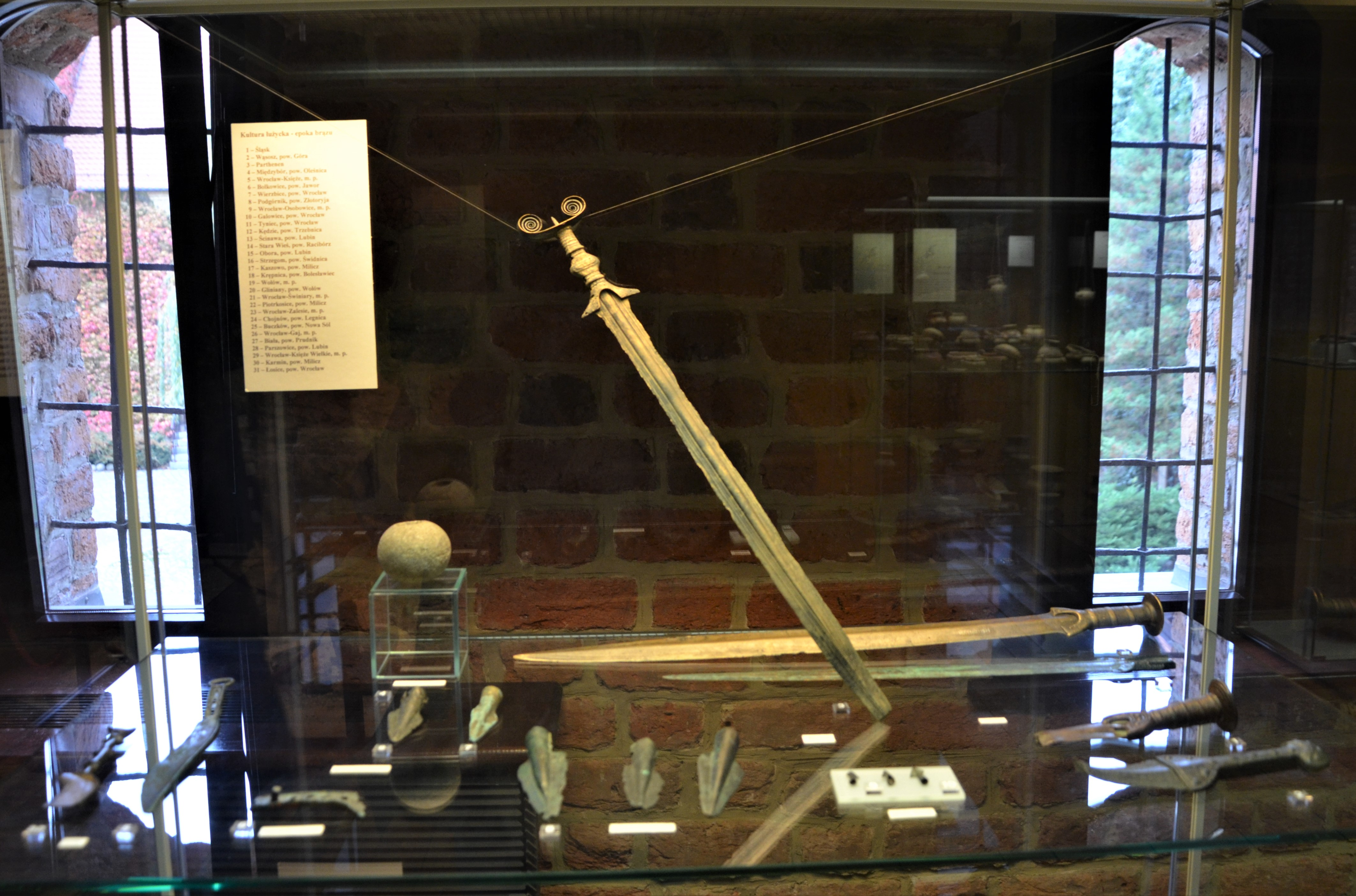
Lusatian weapons

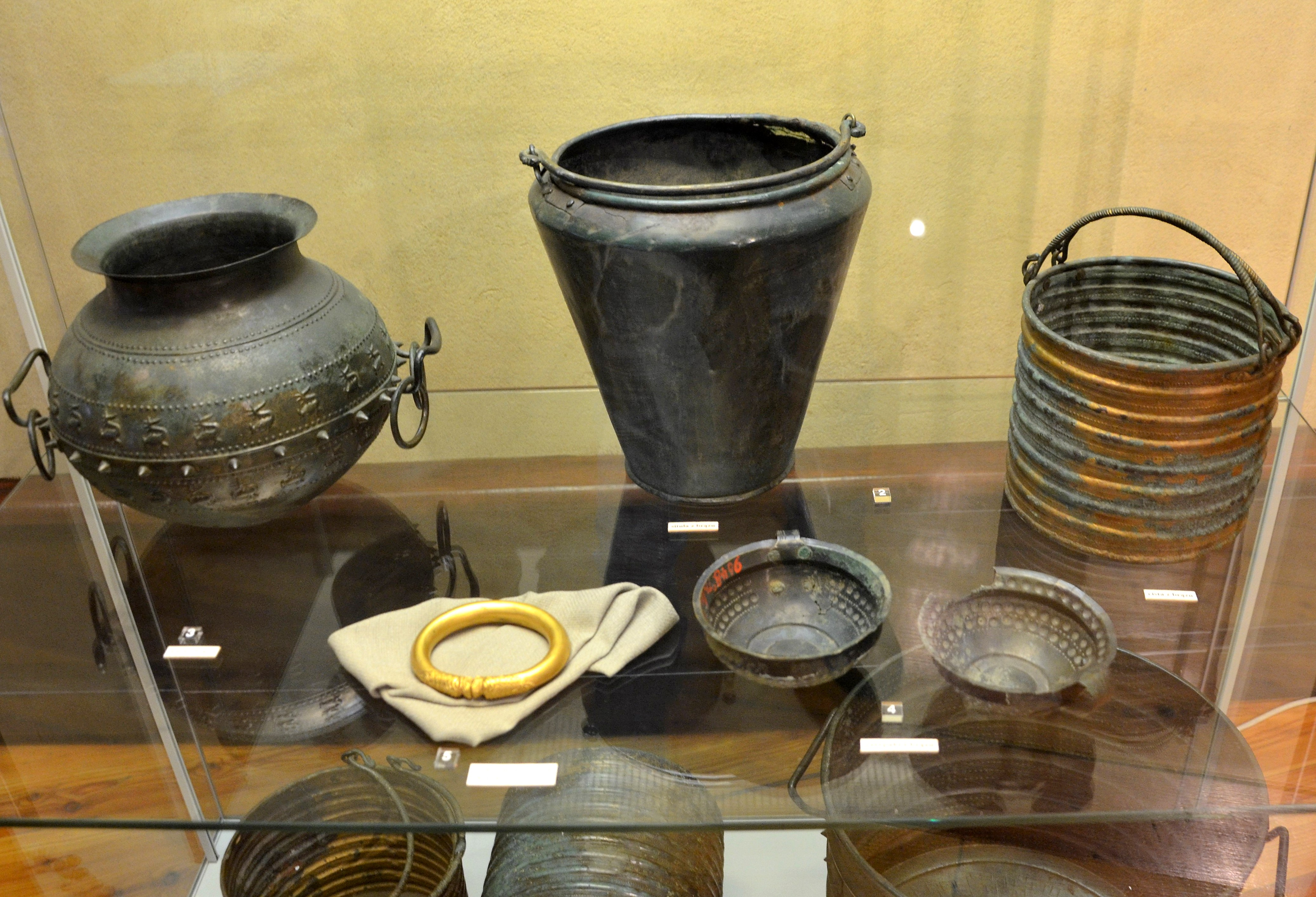
Various artefacts, Bronze and Iron Age

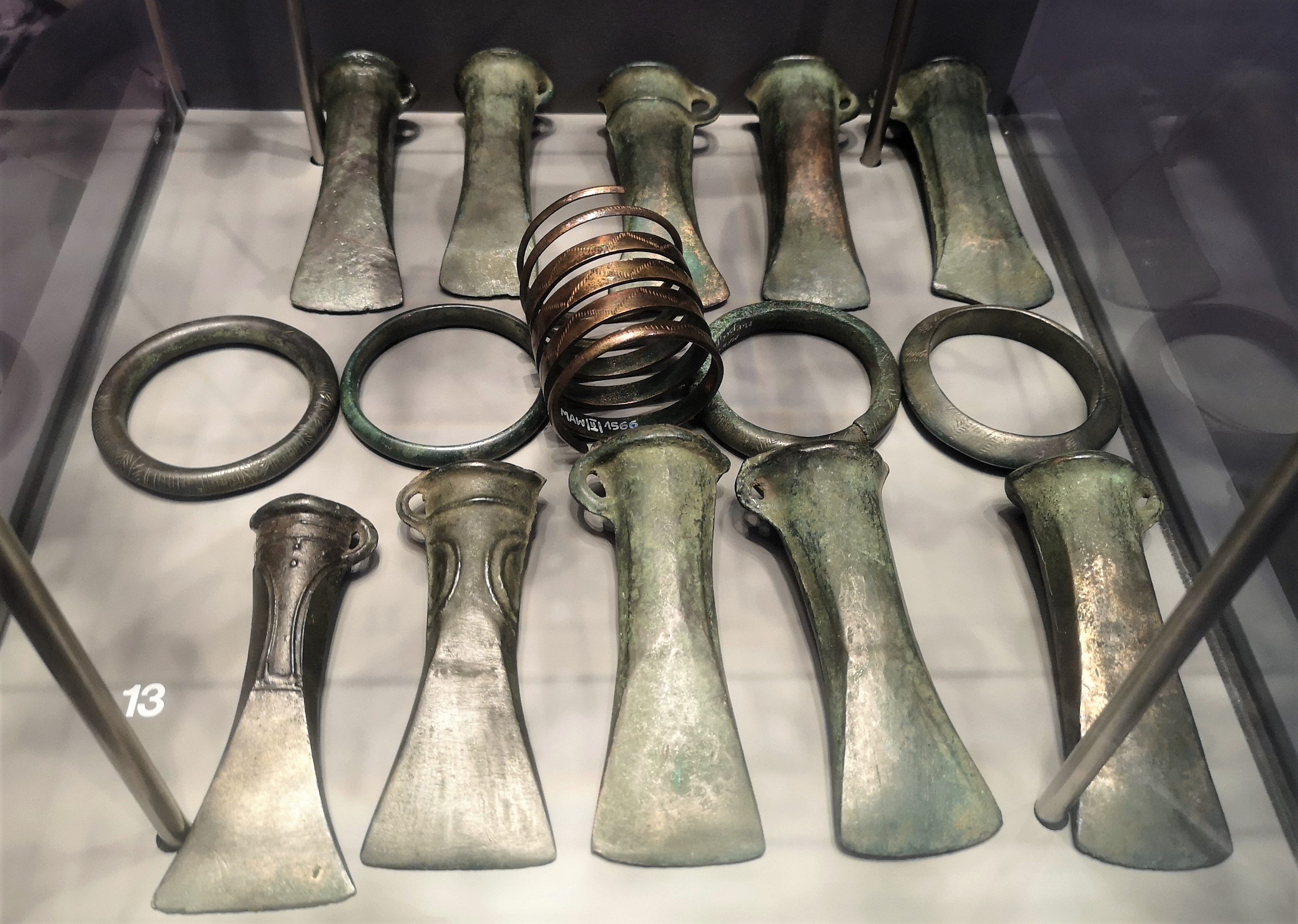
Socketed axes and arm rings

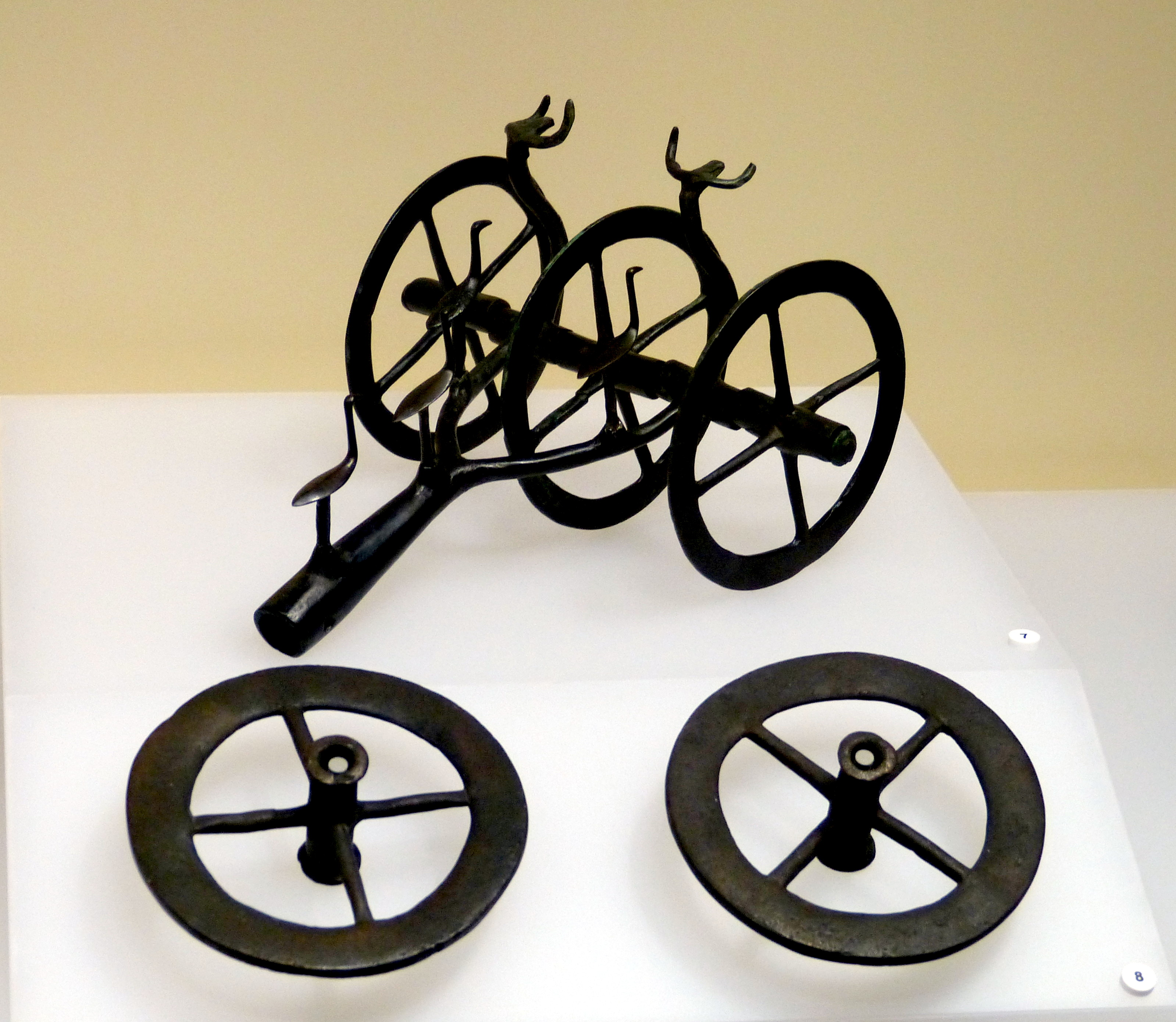
Bronze cult wagon model, Germany

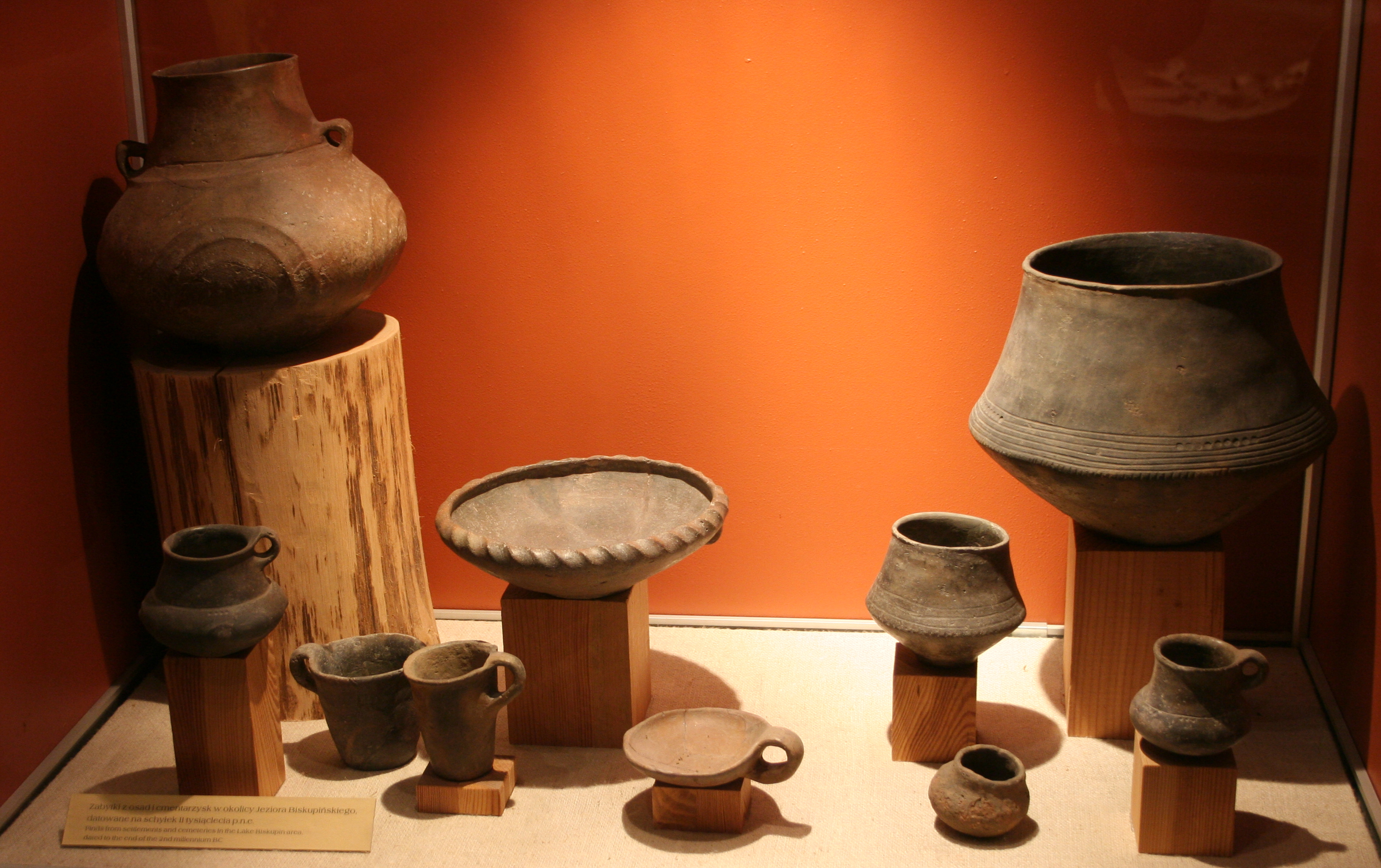
Pottery from Biskupin

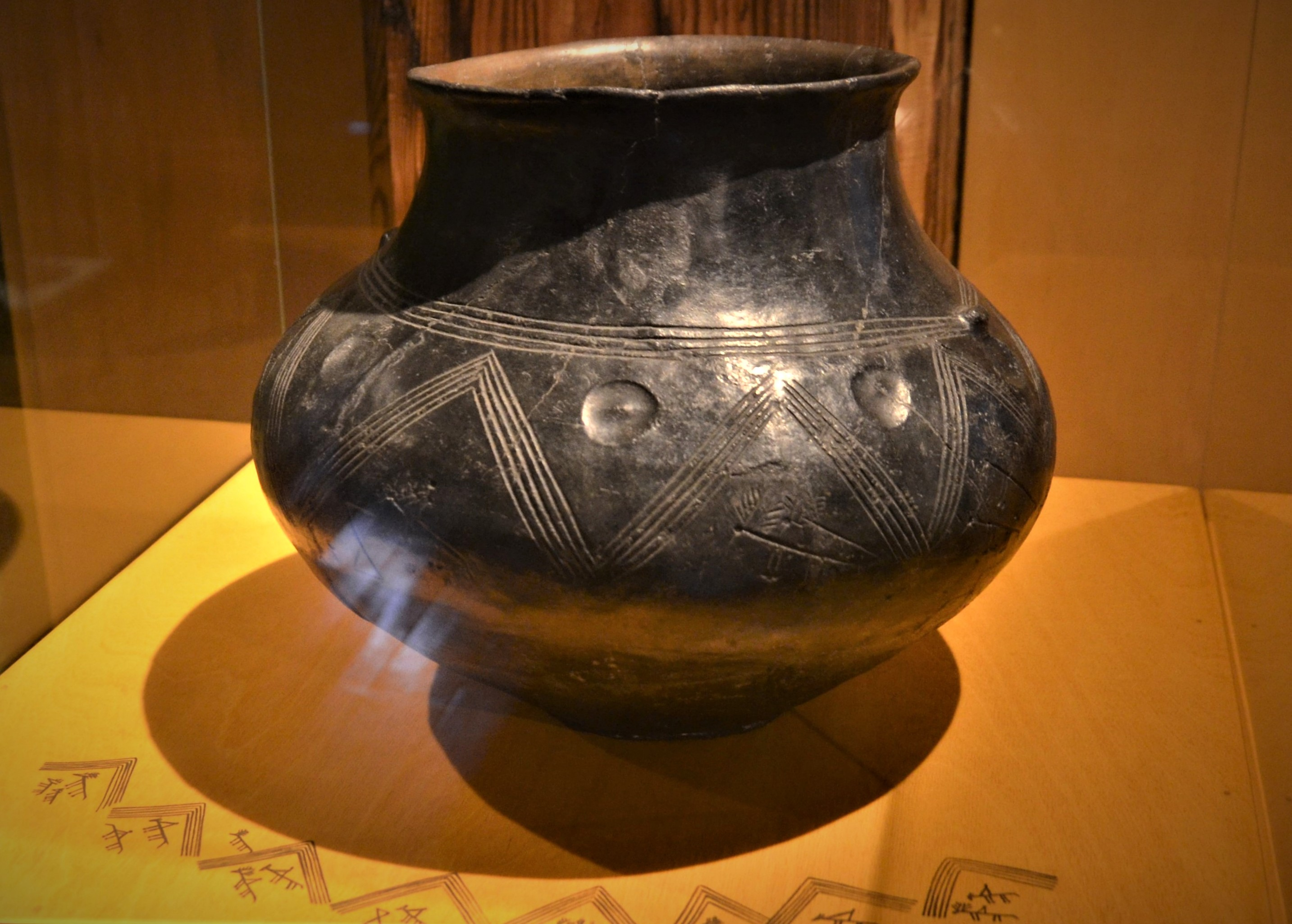
Lusatian cinerary urn

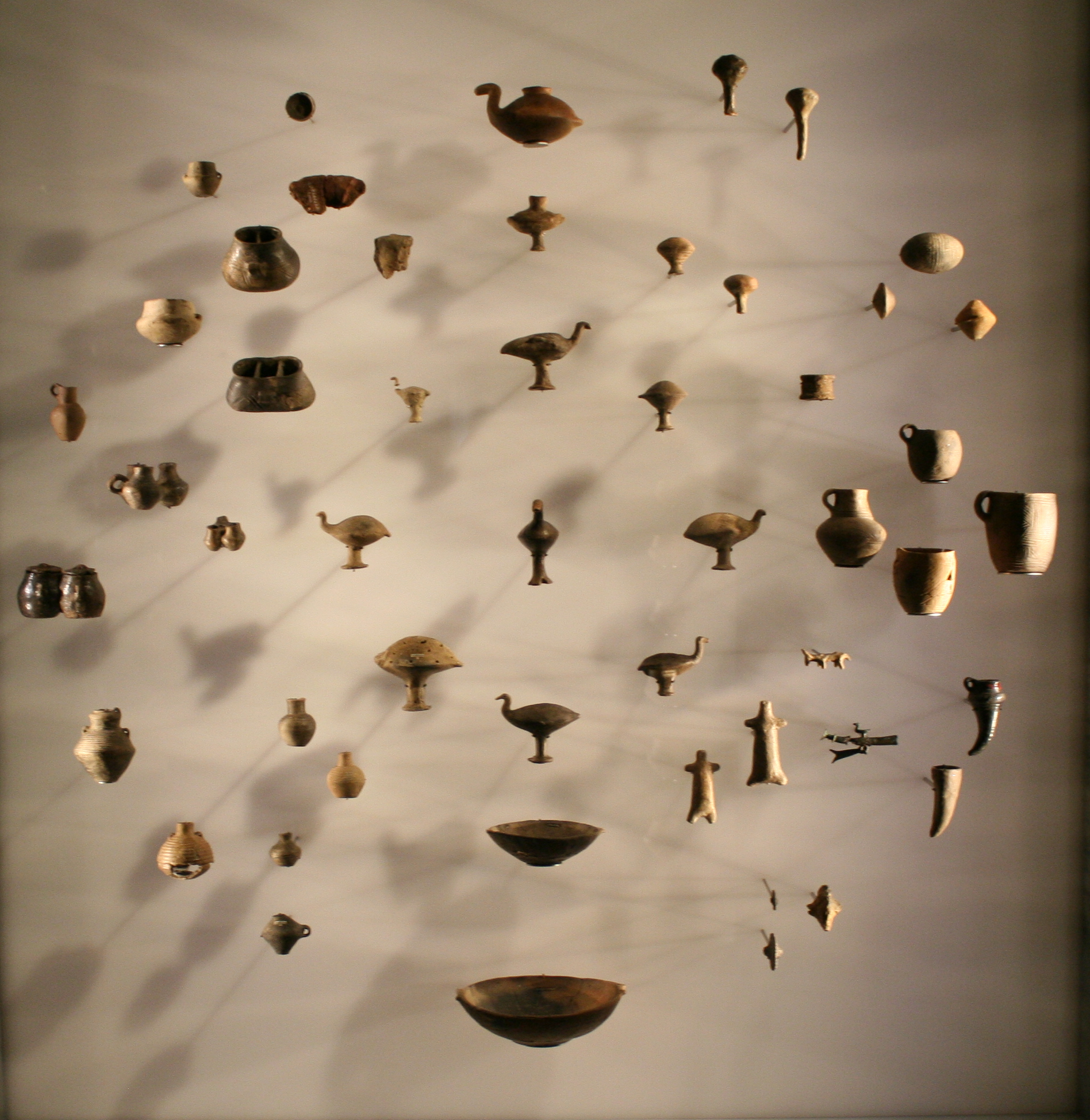
Pottery and figurines, Germany

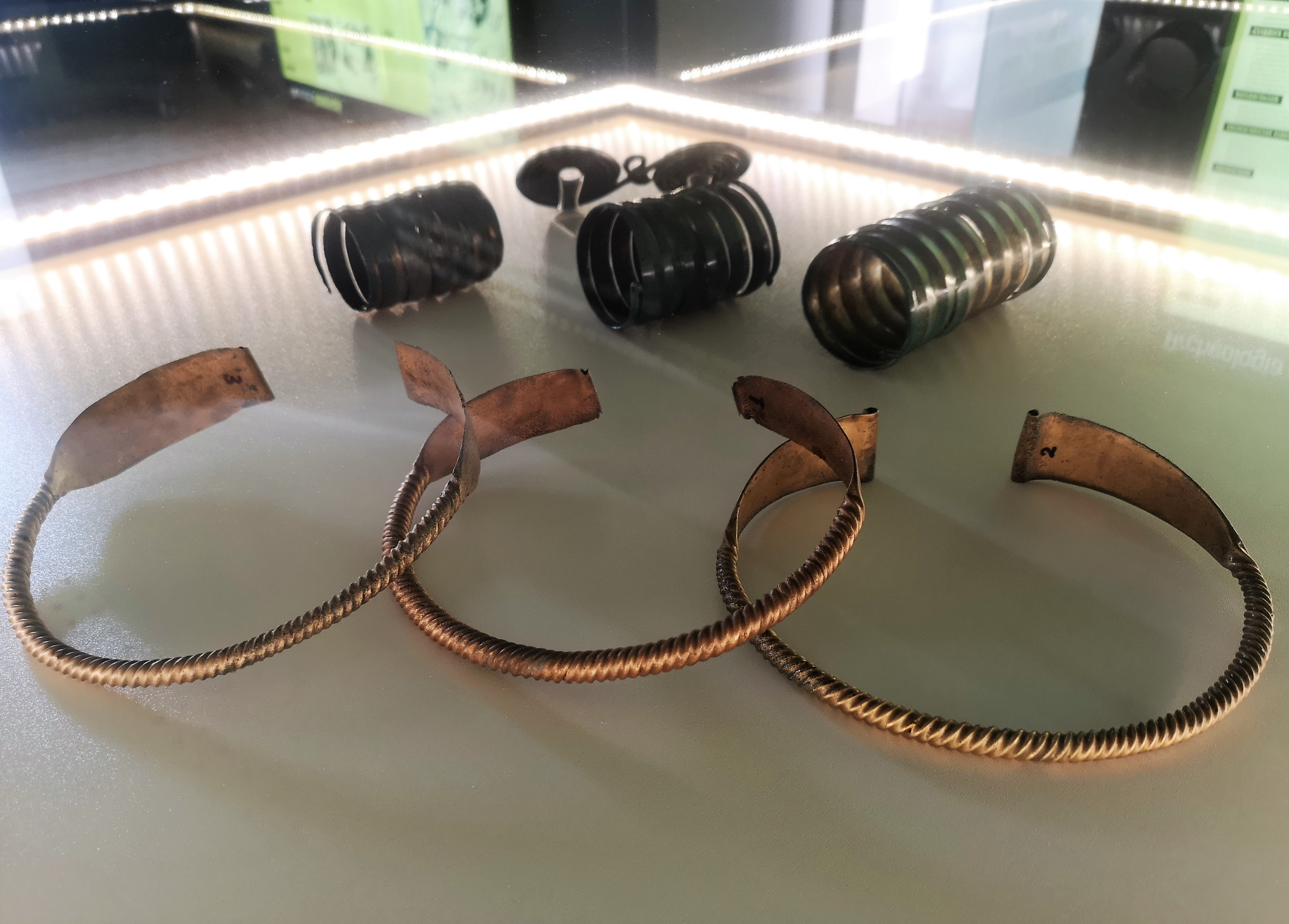
Torcs and arm rings

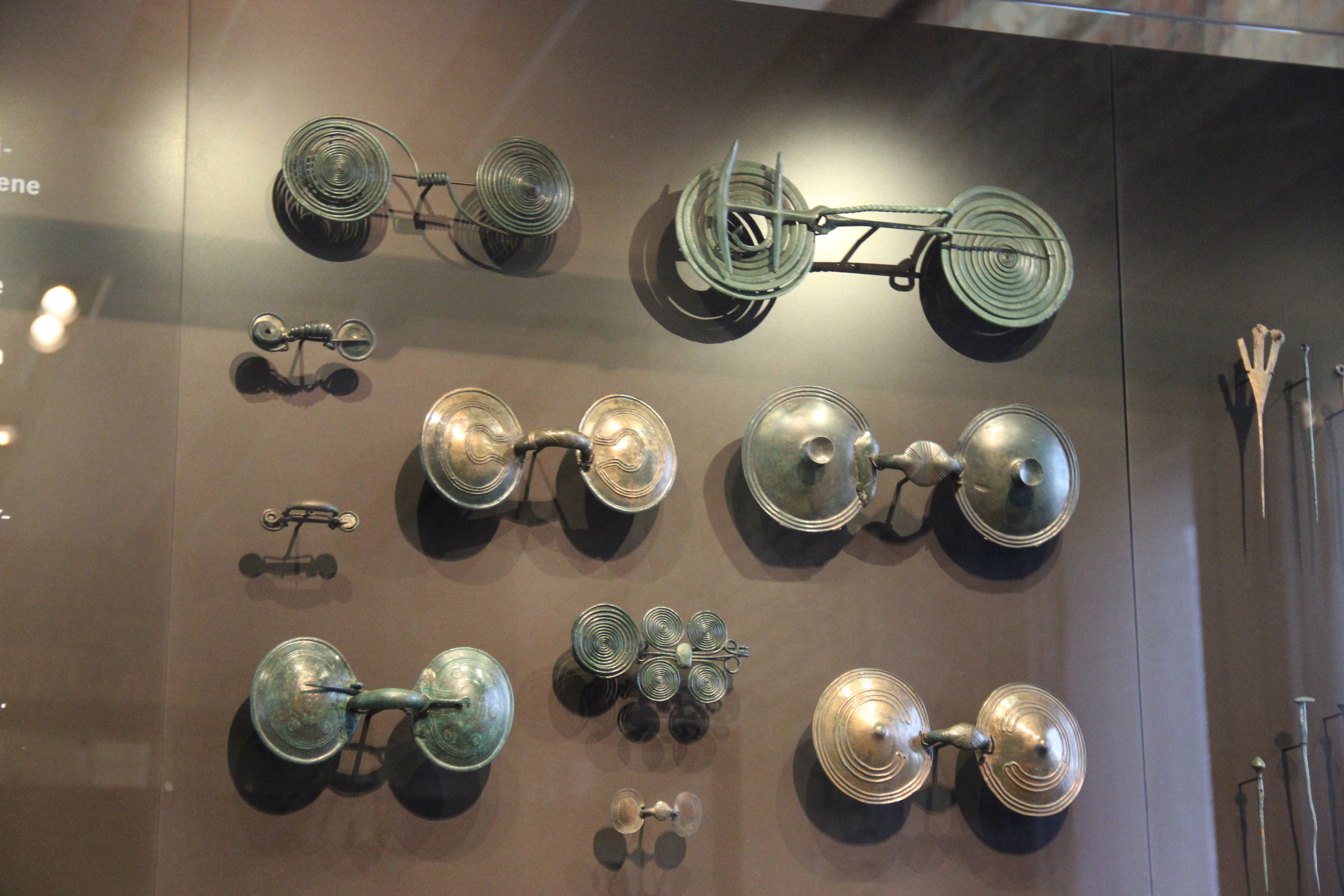
Bronze fibulae, Germany

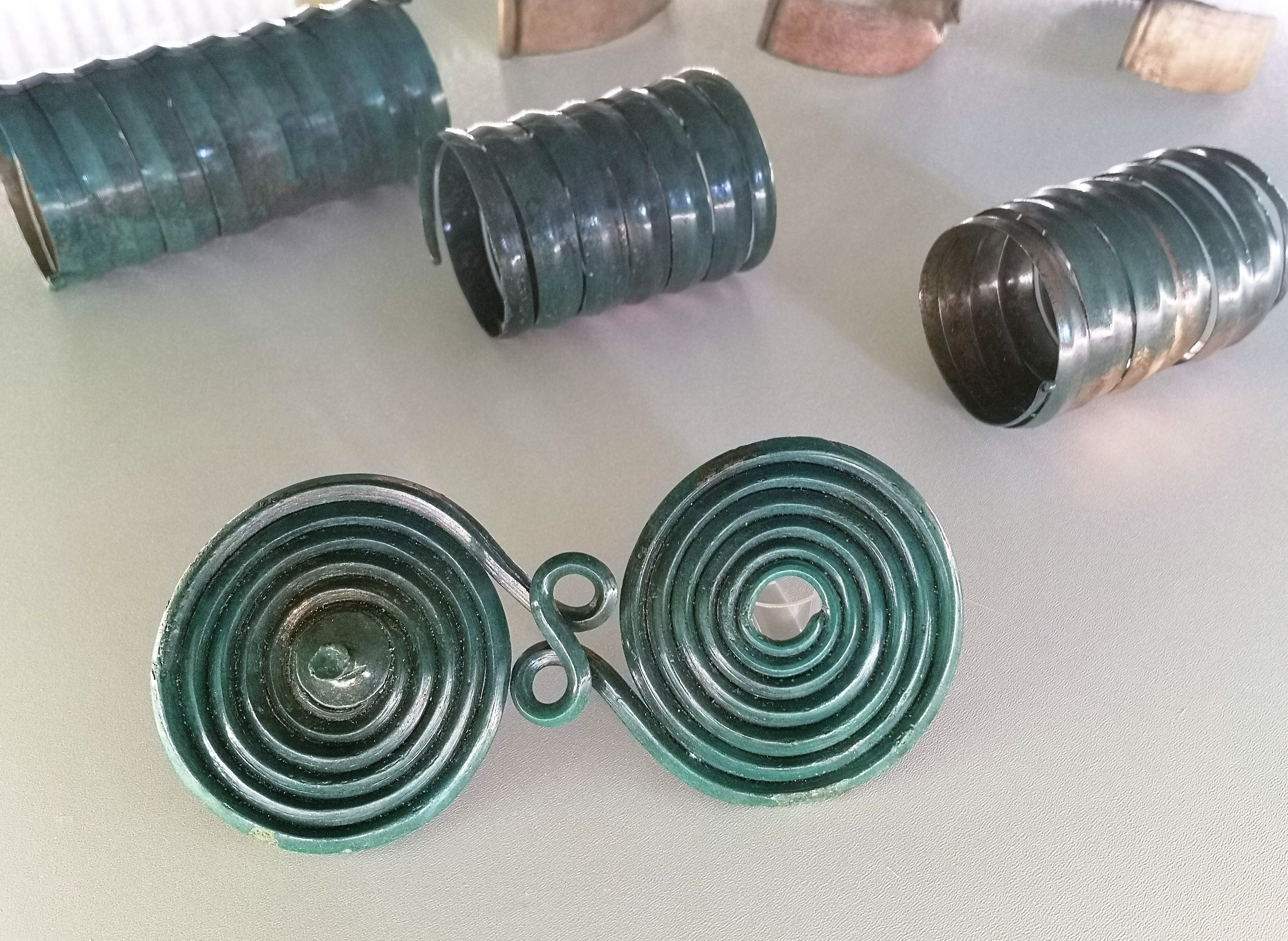
Fibula and arm rings

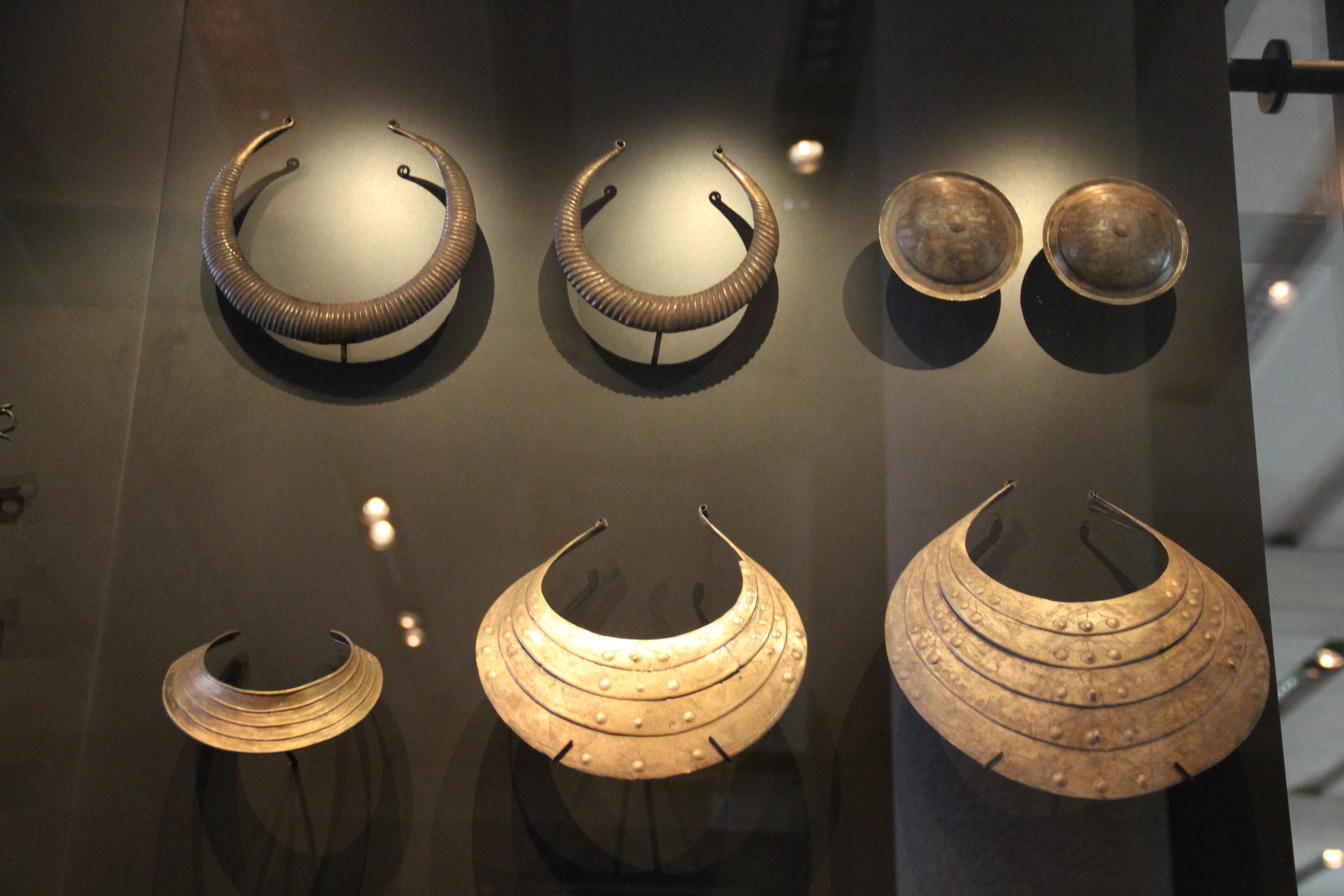
Bronze Age ornaments, Germany

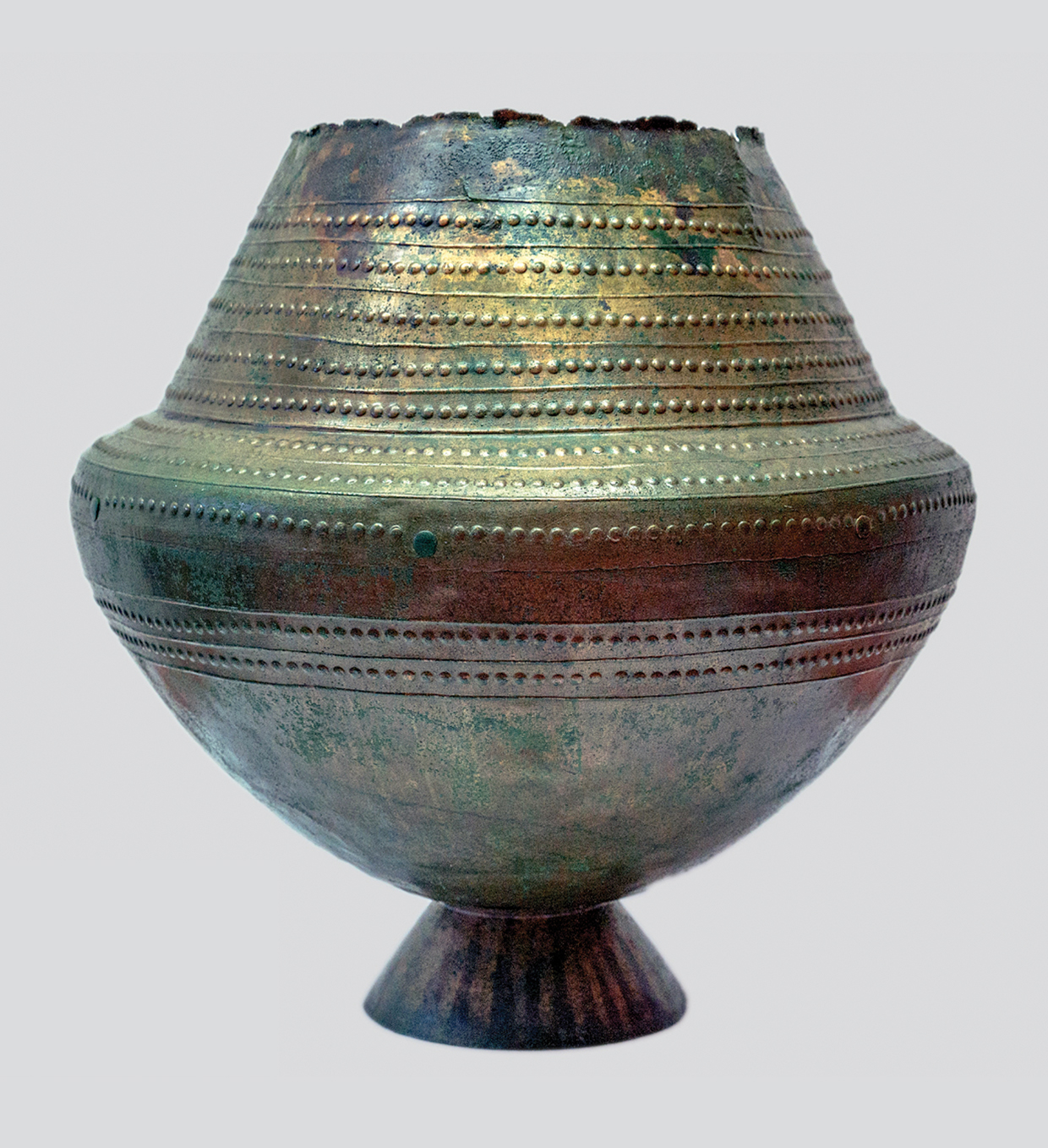
Bronze vessel, Poland, c. 950 BC

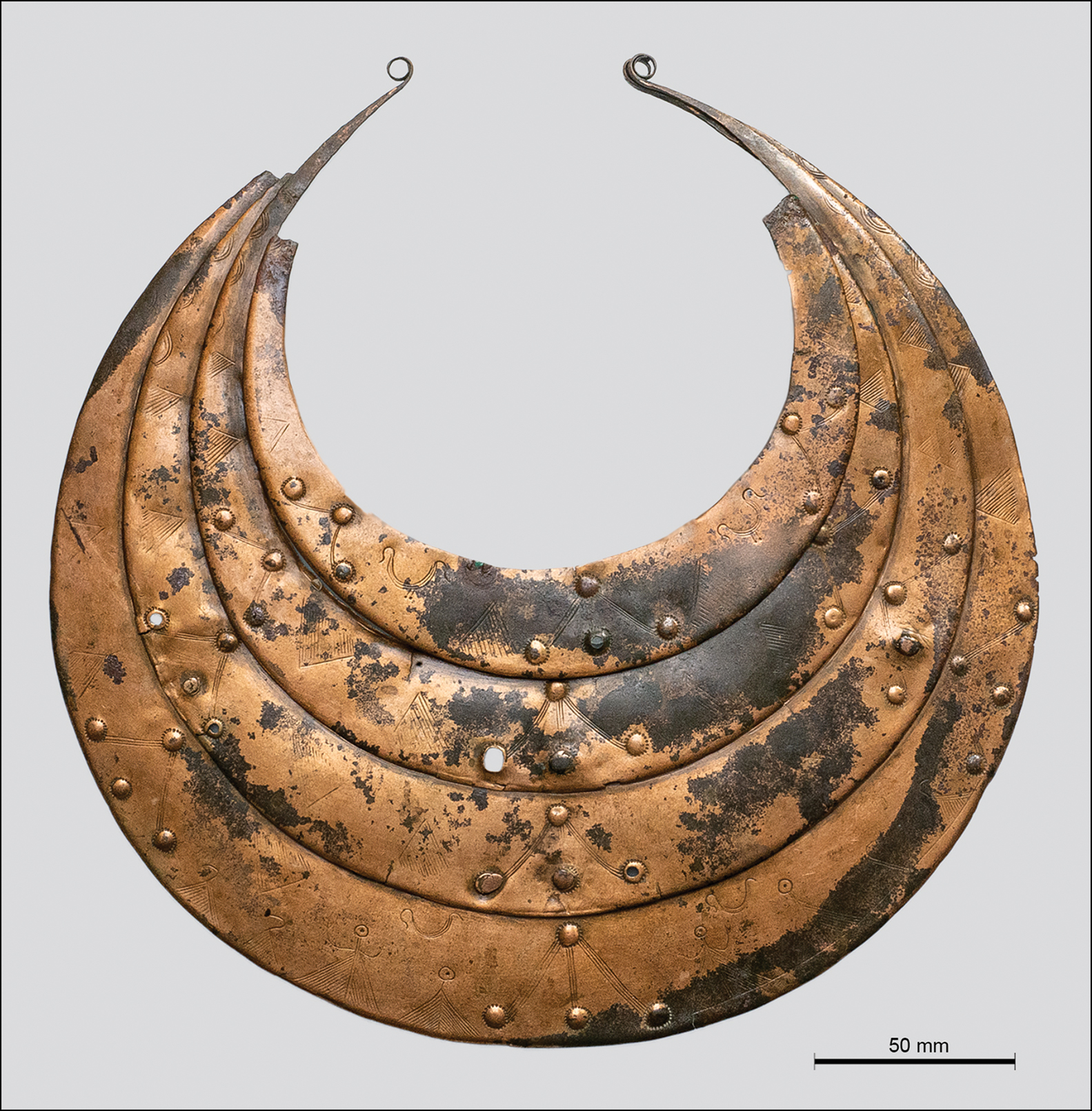
Bronze collar with sun ship motifs.

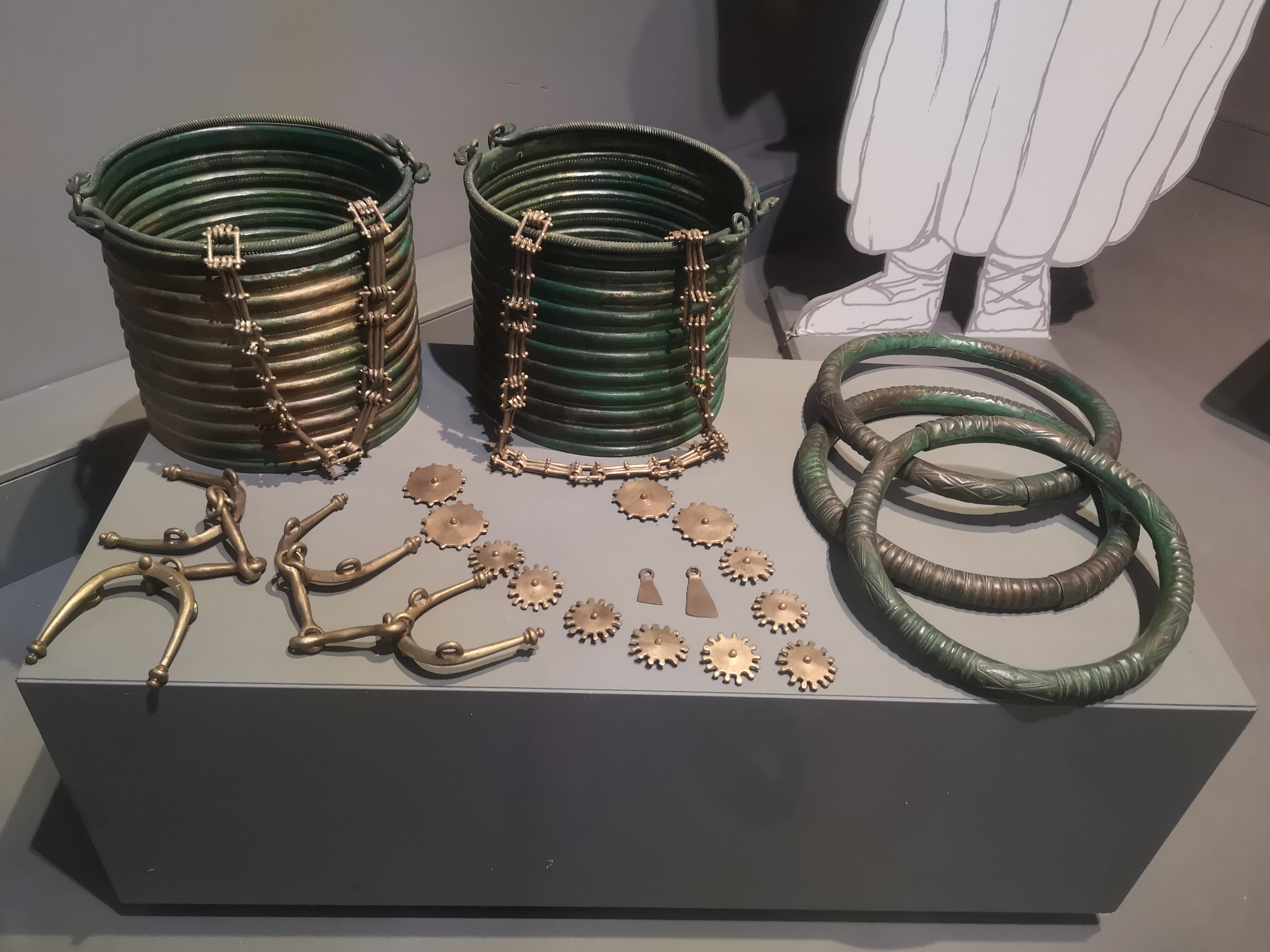
Hoard from Woskowice Małe, Poland, 550 BC

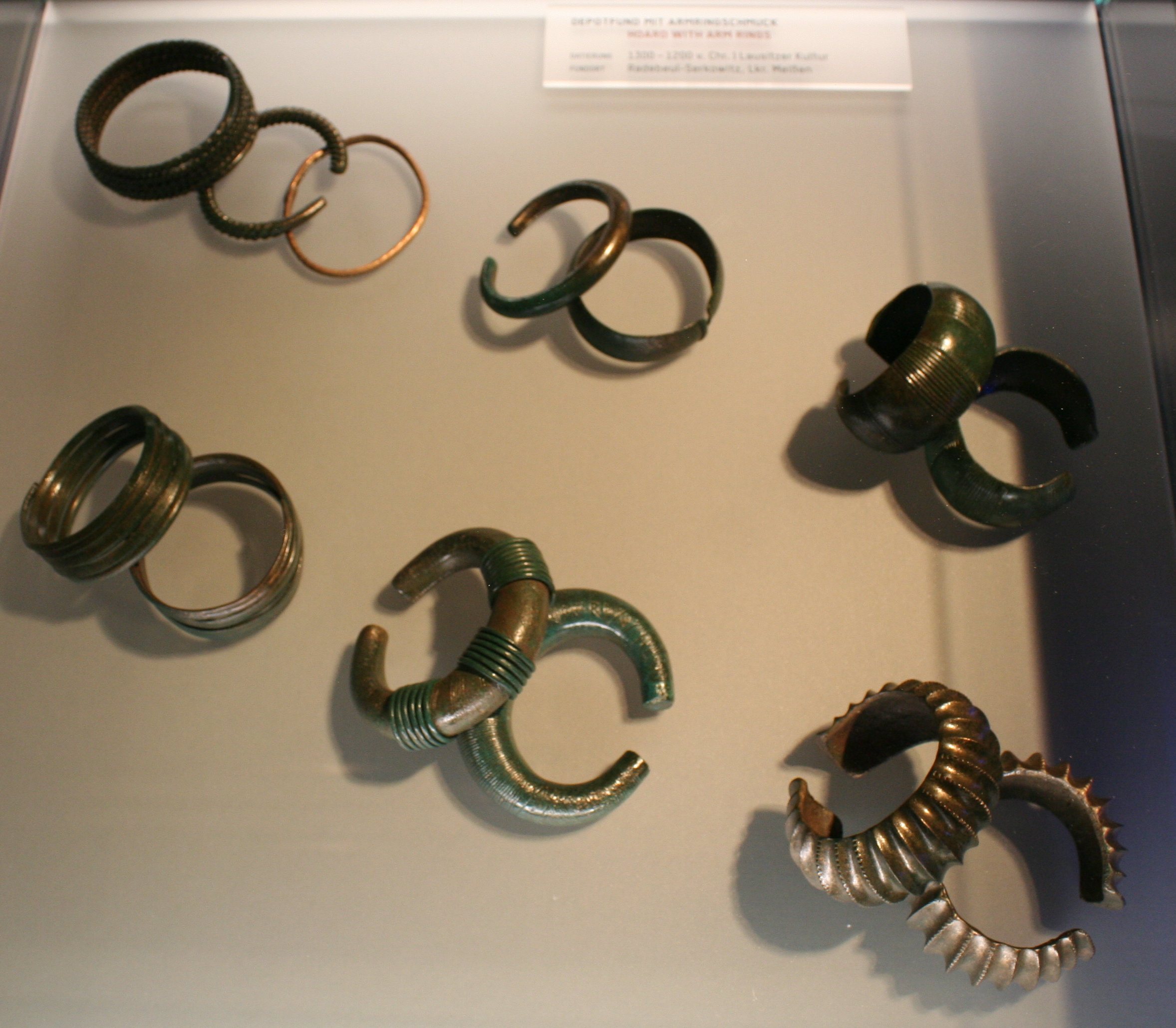
Bronze arm rings, Germany

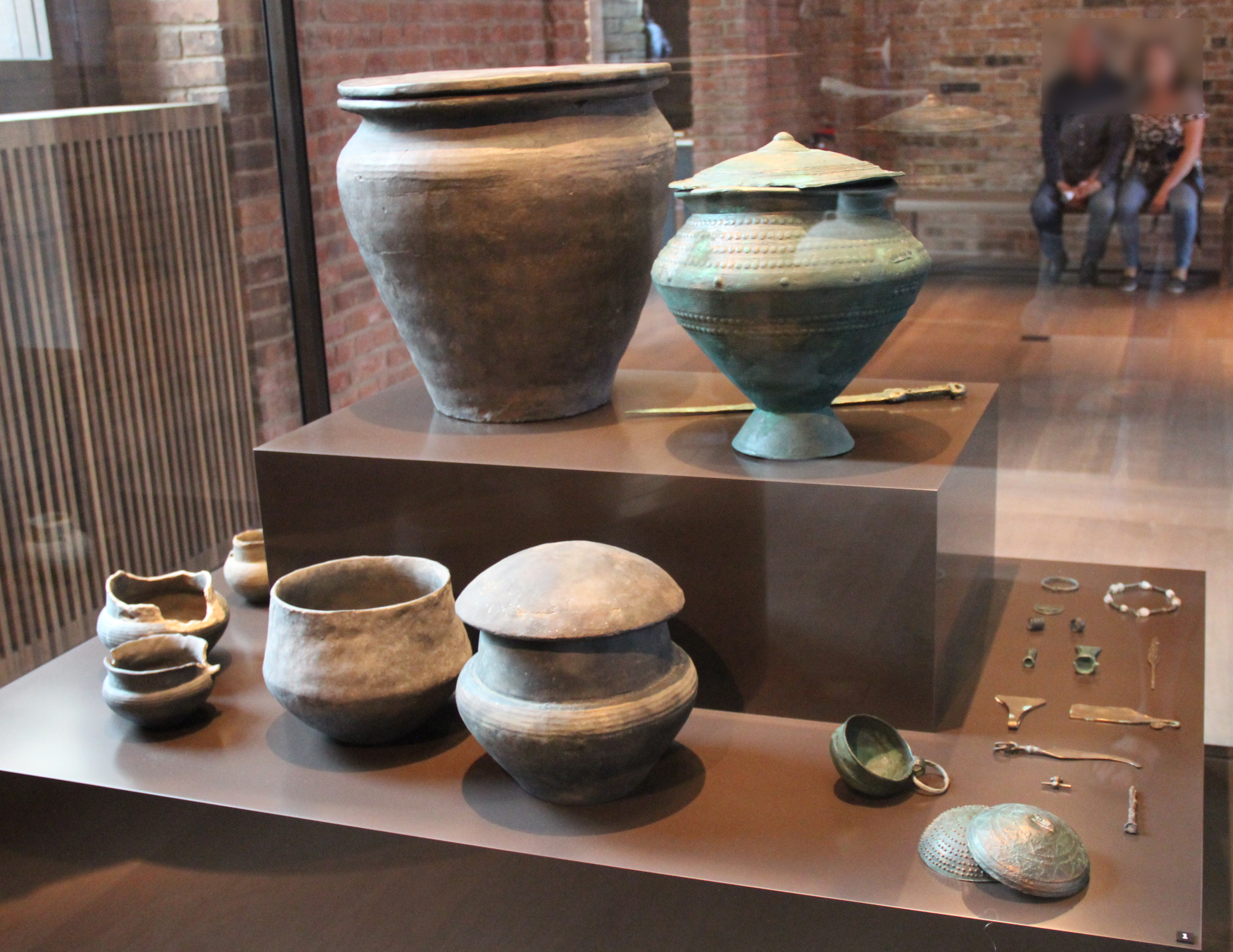
Königsgrab von Seddin contents, c. 900 BC, Germany

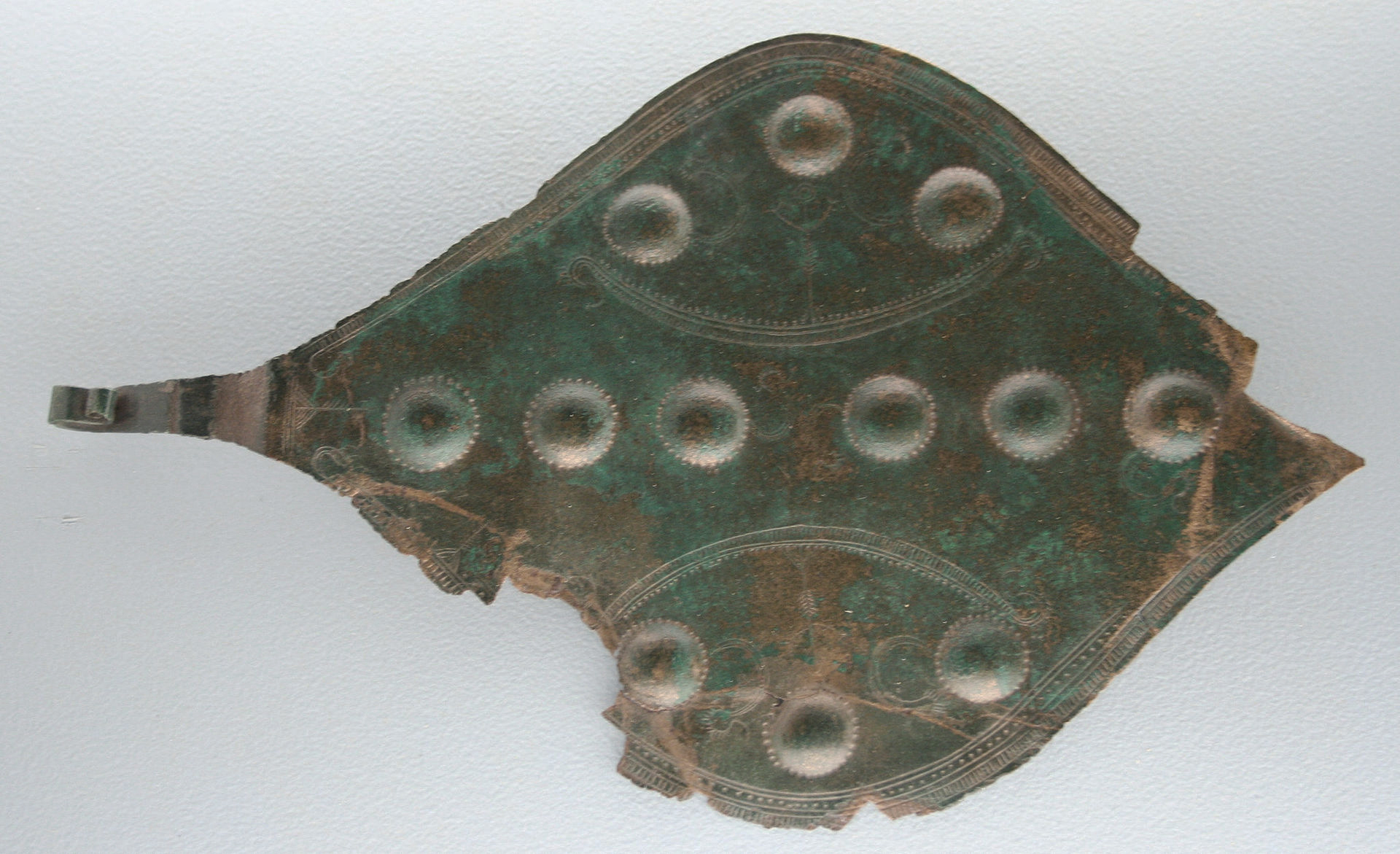
Belt plate with sun ship motif, Poland, 9th century BC (Note: "This Late Bronze Age belt hook from Radolinek (former Floth), woj. wielkopolskie ['Greater Poland voivodeship', Poland], shows two ships, keels facing each other, on each of which a figure stands with arms raised in worship. Above each ship, three phases of the sun's journey are shown. The sun is pulled across the sky by birds and only seems to rest at its zenith. The metal plate is framed at the edges by two more sun-ships." — Meller (2021))

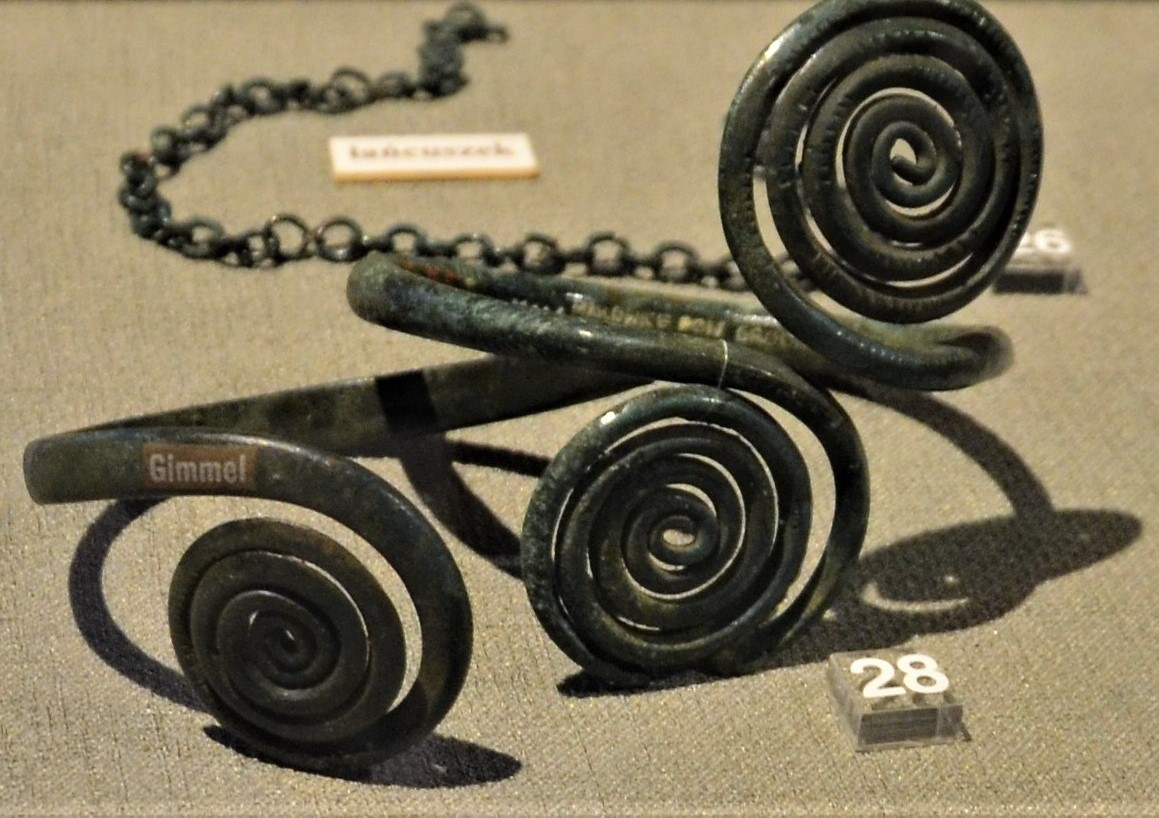
Bronze arm bands

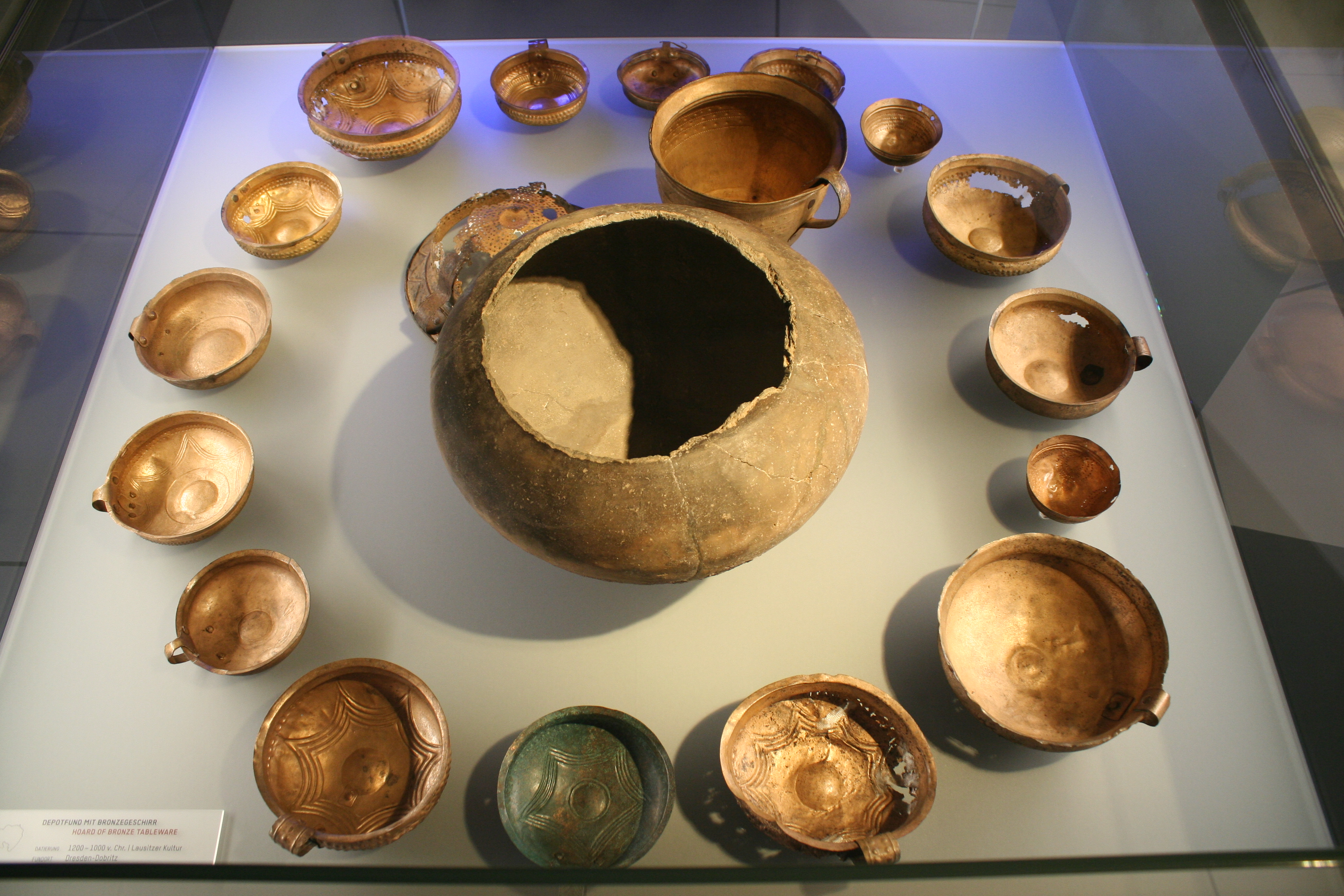
Bronze tableware, 1200–1000 BC, Dresden, Germany

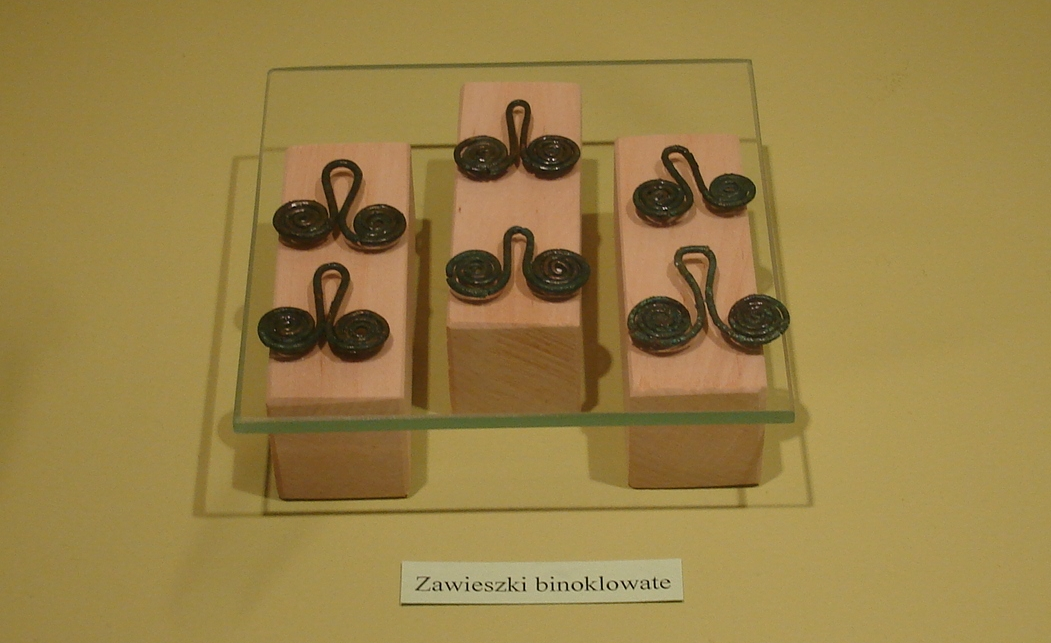
Bronze spiral 'spectacle' pendants

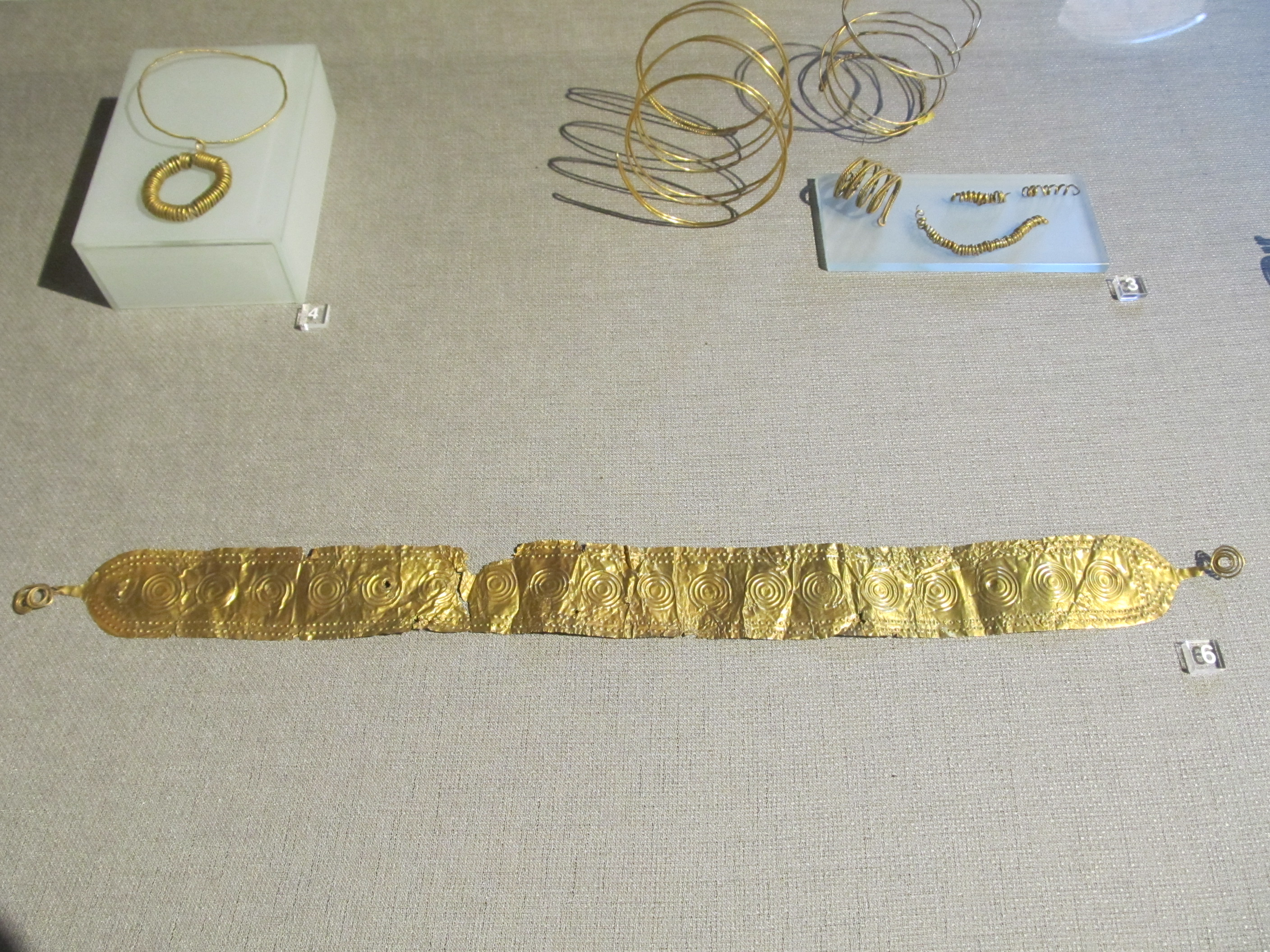
Gold diadem from Sichów, Poland

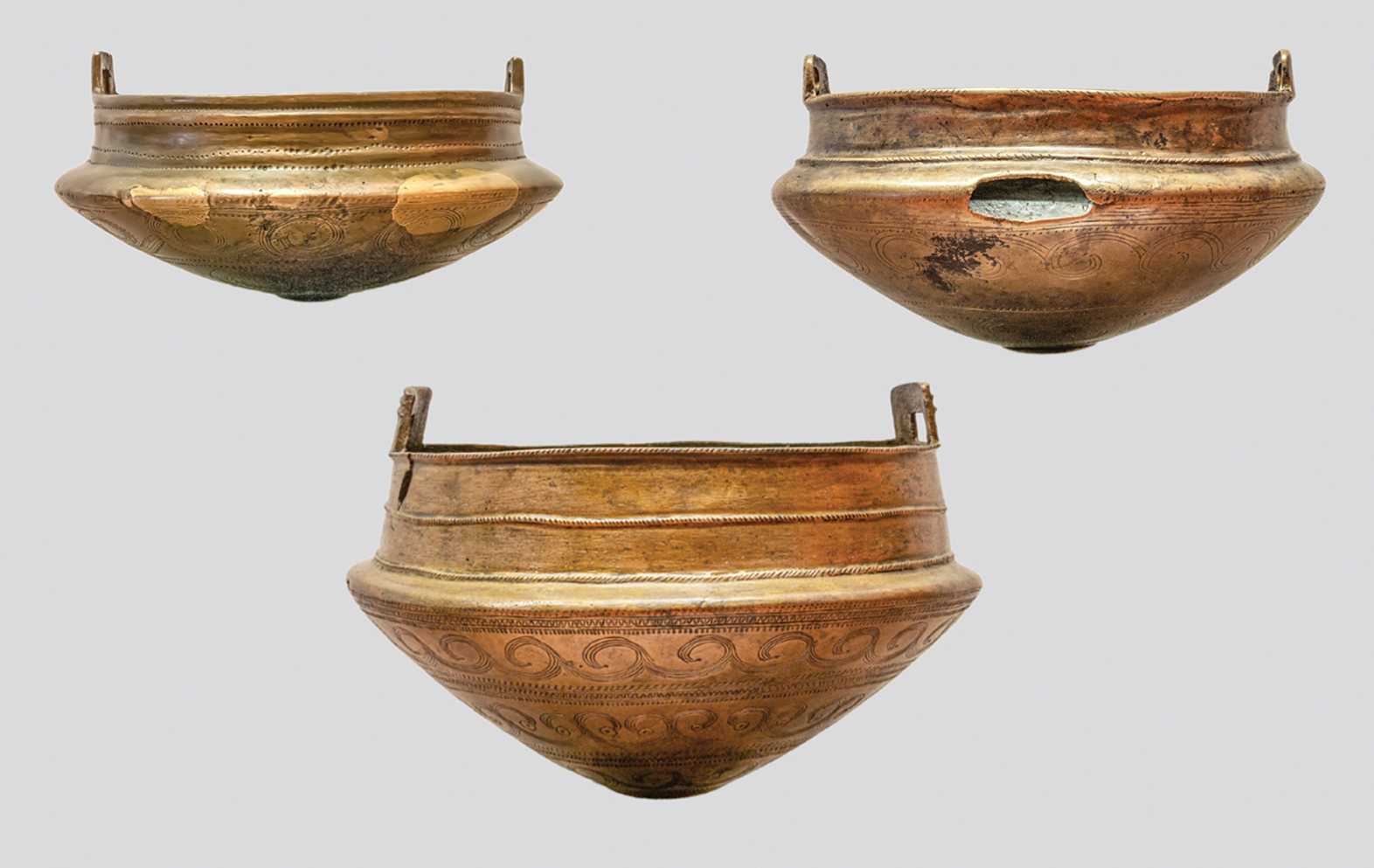
Bronze hanging bowls, Poland

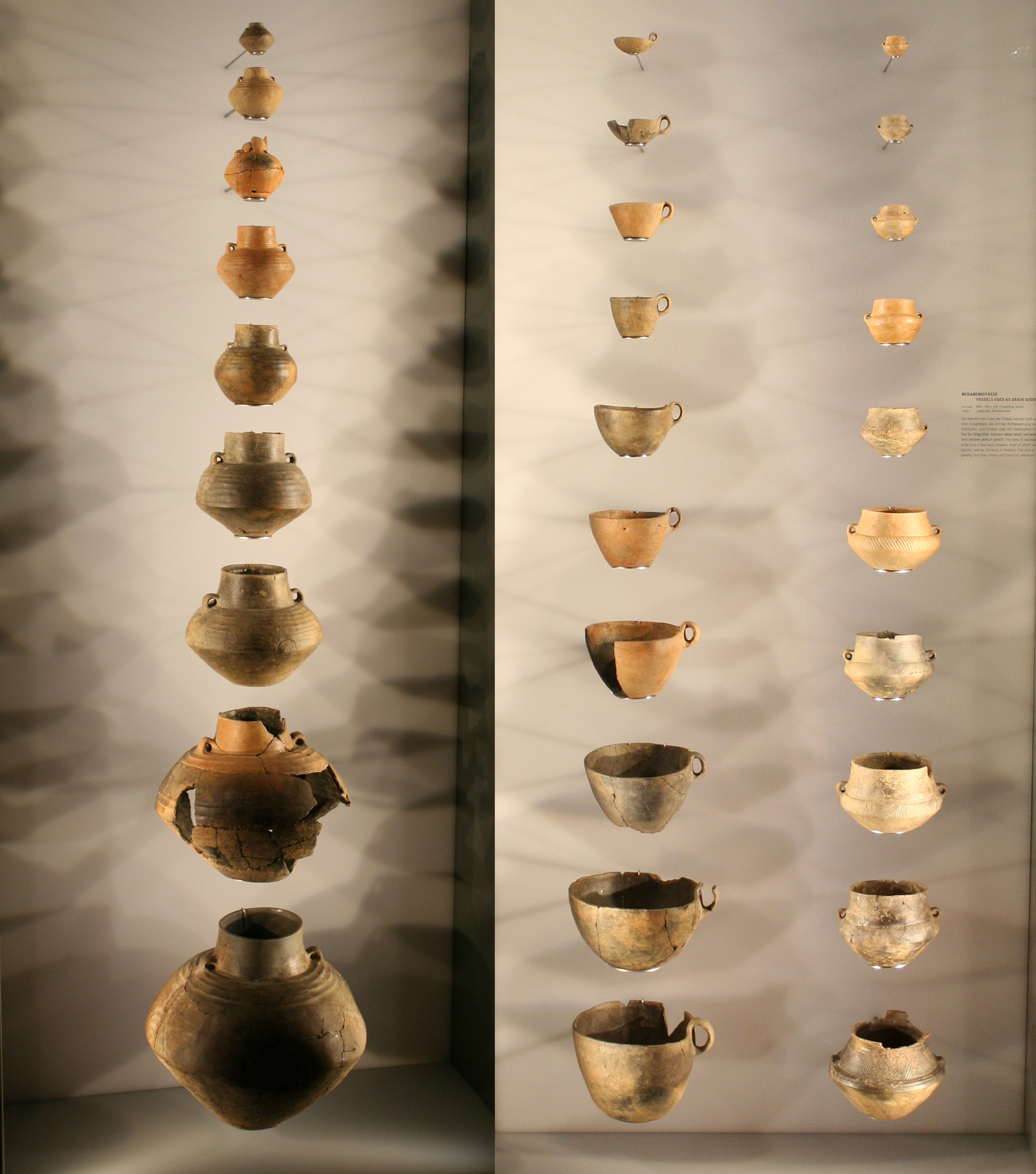
Lusatian pottery, Germany

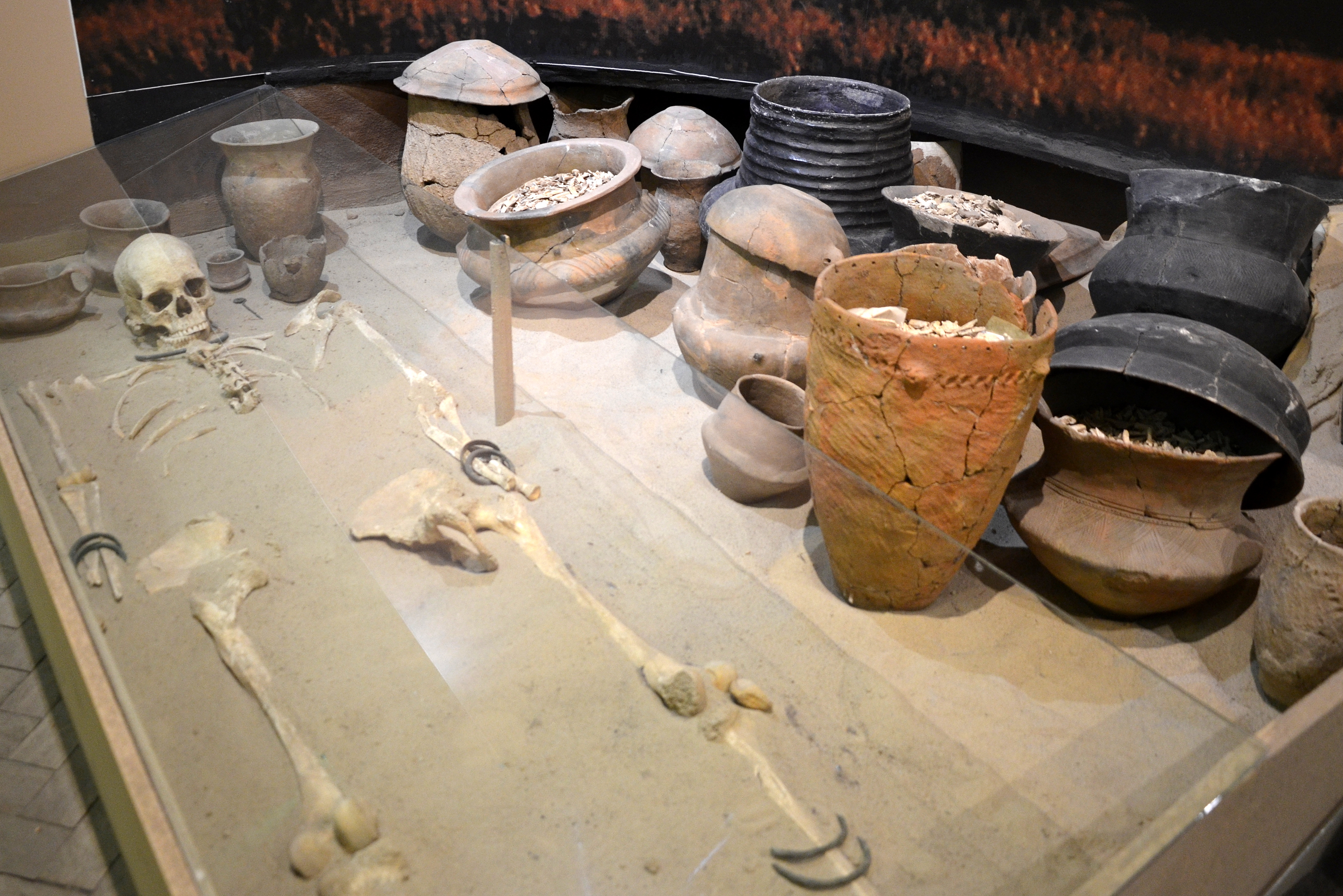
Burial, Poland, c. 1200 BC

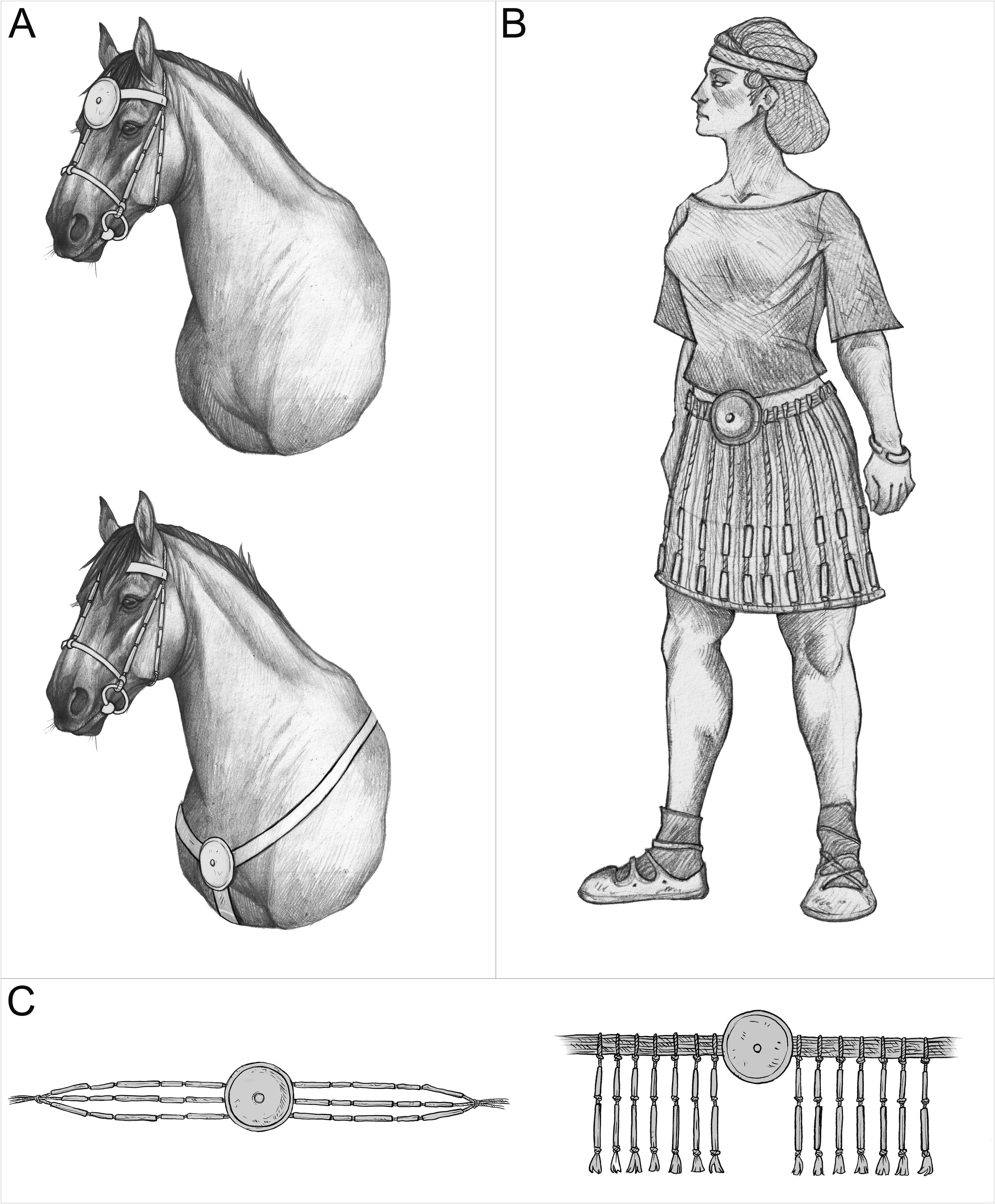
Reconstruction of Lusatian artefacts

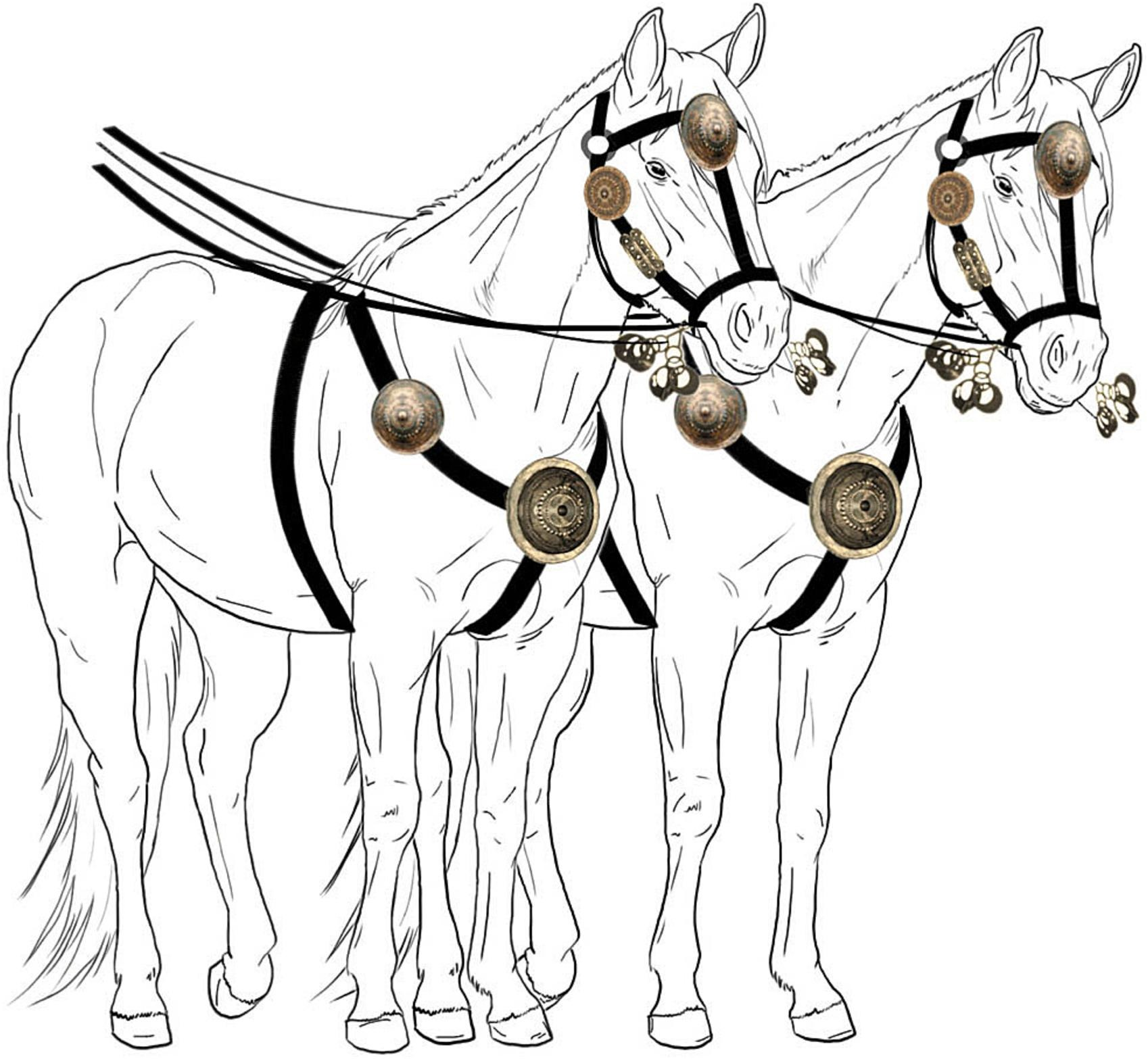
Kaliska hoard II, reconstruction

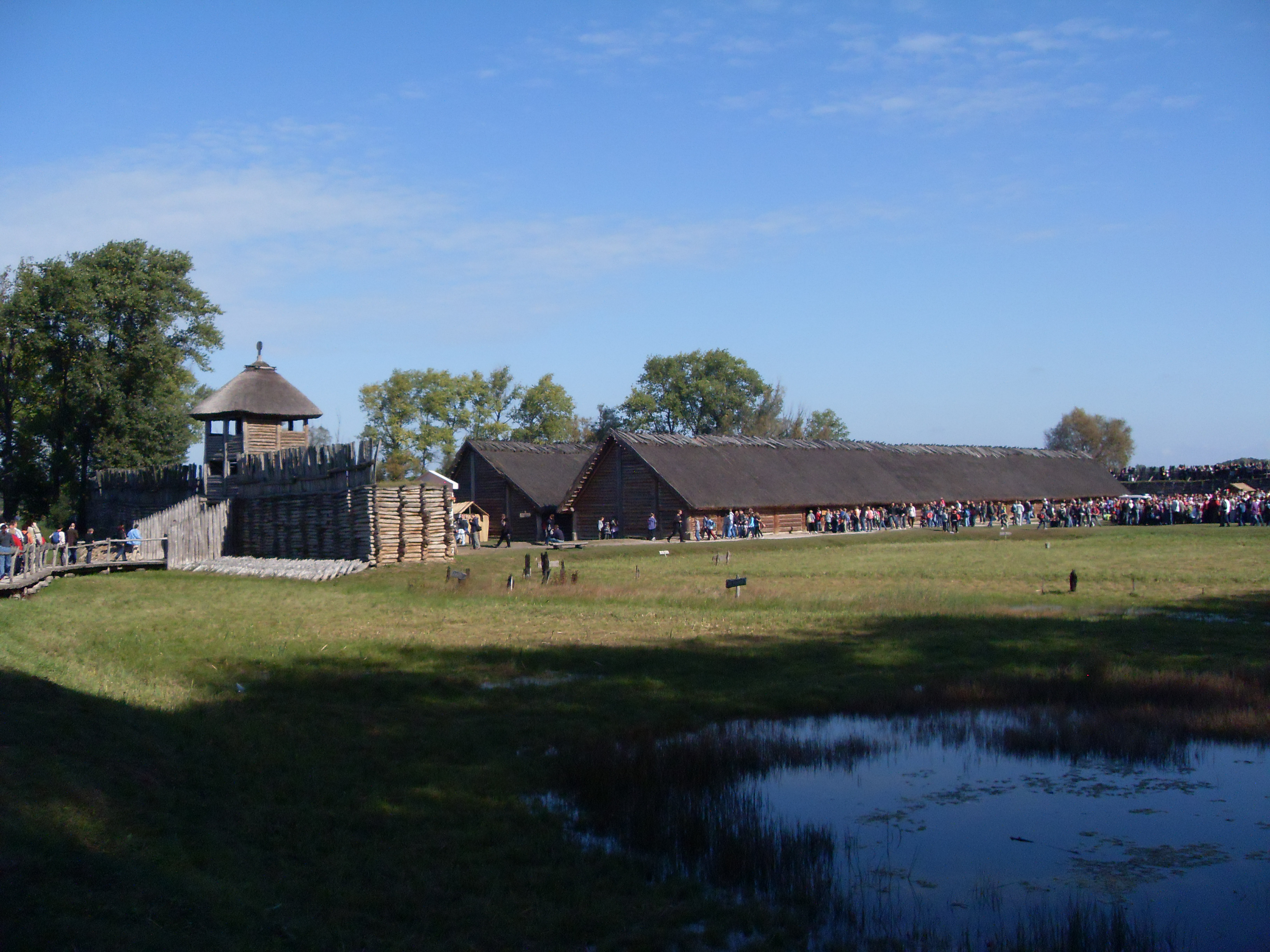
Reconstructed buildings at Biskupin

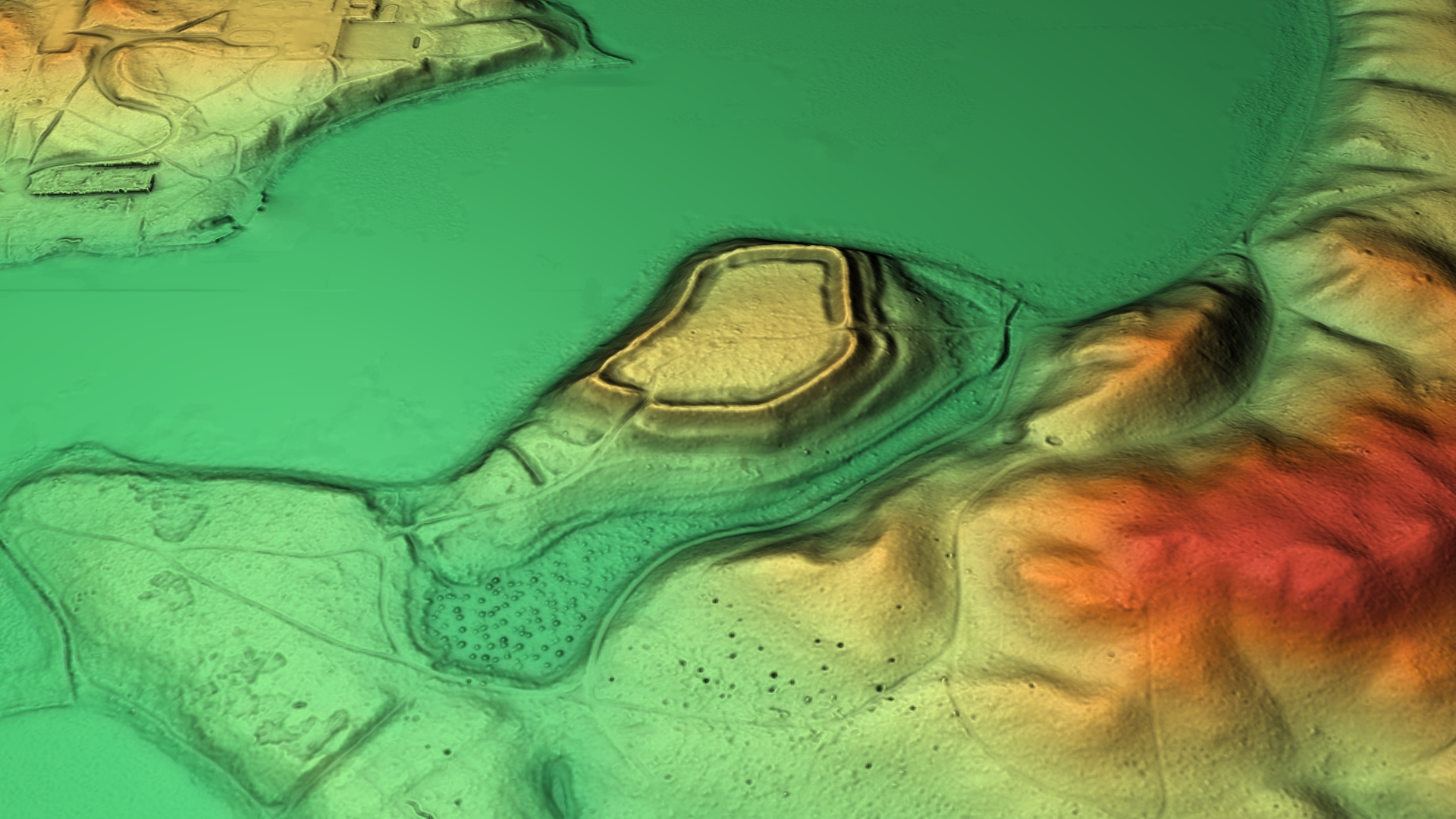
3D model of a Lusatian rampart fortification in Potsdam near Berlin

== See also ==
- Púchov culture
- Corded Ware culture
- Mierzanowice culture
- Bronze and Iron Age Poland
- Schweinert burial mounds
- Heidenschanze fortified settlement
- Schwedenschanze Isingerode
