= Euro (disambiguation) =

The euro (sign: €; code: EUR) is the official currency of the eurozone.

Euro may also refer to:

== People ==
- Euro (rapper) (born 1992), a Dominican-American rapper

== Europe ==
- Euro-, a prefix meaning "European"
- UEFA European Championship, an association football tournament
- Team handball tournaments
  - European Men's Handball Championship
  - European Women's Handball Championship
- Rugby League European Championship, a rugby league tournament
- European emission standards, acceptable limits for exhaust emissions of new vehicles sold in EU member states
- Association of European Operational Research Societies (EURO), a non-profit organization
- the World Health Organization's Regional Office for Europe

== Other ==
- Euro, Western Australia, an abandoned town in Western Australia
- Common wallaroo, a species of macropod also known as the euro
- Eurodance, a genre of electronic dance music that originated in the late 1980s in Europe
- European-American Unity and Rights Organization (EURO), a white nationalist organization in the United States
- Italian ship Euro, various Italian naval ships
- Eurogame, a class of tabletop games with indirect player interaction
- Euro TV, a defunct Italian television channel

== See also ==
- Euros (disambiguation)
- EU (disambiguation)
- Europa (disambiguation)
- Europe (disambiguation)
- Evropa (disambiguation)
