= Europe (disambiguation) =

Europe is one of the continents of the world.

Europe may also refer to:

- Continental Europe, the mainland of Europe excluding the islands surrounding it
- European Union, a European political supranational entity

== Astronomy ==
Europa, natural satellite (moon) of Jupiter

== Greek mythology ==
- Europa (Greek myth), or Europe, several figures in Greek mythology, including:
  - Europa (consort of Zeus), a lover of Zeus
  - Europa, one of the Oceanids
  - Europa, one of the many consorts of Danaus, mother of several of the Danaïdes
  - Europa (daughter of Tityos), possible mother of Euphemus by Poseidon
  - Europa, one of the possible consorts of Phoroneus
  - Europa (daughter of Laodicus), one of the sacrificial victims of Minotaur
  - Europa, a surname of Demeter

== Literature ==
- Europe (magazine), a French literary journal founded in 1923 by Romain Rolland
- "Europe" (short story), an 1899 short story by Henry James
- Europe: A History, a 1996 book by Norman Davies
- Europe a Prophecy, a 1794 prophetic book by William Blake
- Europe, a 1987 play by Michael Gow

== Music ==
- "Europe" (anthem), the national anthem of the Republic of Kosovo
- Europe (band), a Swedish hard rock band
- Europe (Allo Darlin' album), 2012
- Europe (Europe album), 1983
- Europe (Ghost Mice album), 2006
- Europe (Paul Motian album), 2001
- James Reese Europe (1880–1919), American ragtime and early jazz bandleader, arranger, and composer

== Other uses ==
- Europe (1803 EIC ship), a British East Indiaman
- Europe (dinghy), a one-person dinghy designed in 1960
- Europe station (Paris Metro), a metro station in Paris, France
- Europe: A Natural History, a 2005 British nature documentary TV series
- Team Europe, several unified teams representing Europe in international sporting competitions
- "Europe", a Series E episode of the television series QI (2007)

== See also ==
- European (disambiguation)
- Europa (disambiguation)
- EU (disambiguation)
- Euro (disambiguation)
- Terminology of the British Isles § Europe
