= EV =

Ev or EV may refer to:

== Businesses ==
- Electro-Voice, a United States manufacturer of amplifiers, microphones, other audio equipment and speakers
- Expressjet Airlines (IATA designator)
- Atlantic Southeast Airlines (IATA designator)
- EVDirect, distributor of BYD vehicles in Australia (2022–2025)

== In economics ==
- Embedded value, the present value of future profits for a life insurance company
- Enterprise value, an economic measure reflecting the market value of a whole business
- Equivalent variation, a measure of how much more money a consumer would pay before a price increase to avert the price increase

== People ==
- Ev (given name)

== Science, technology, and mathematics ==
- Electric vehicle, a vehicle using an electric motor instead of an internal combustion engine
- Electric car, a type of electric vehicle
- Electronvolt (eV), in physics, a unit of energy
- Enterovirus, a genus of viruses
- Epidermodysplasia verruciformis, a skin condition
- Ester value, analytical parameter used in chemistry
- Estradiol valerate, an estrogen medication
- Evoked potential, electrical potential evoked in the nervous system
- Evolution-Data Optimized, a telecommunications standard for the wireless transmission of data through radio signals
- Expected value, the mean of a random variable's probability distribution
- Exposure value, a combination of shutter speed and aperture in photography
- Extended Validation Certificate, a type of X.509 Certificate used in securing computer communications
- Extracellular vesicle, a membrane-bound vesicle
- Stereo-4, also known as EV (Electro-Voice), a quadraphonic sound system developed in 1970
- Exploration vessel (E/V), a type of marine vessel

== Other uses ==
- Land of Ev, a fictional country in the Oz books of L. Frank Baum and his successors
- Eesti Vabariik, Estonian for Republic of Estonia
- eingetragener Verein ('registered association'; e.V.), a legal status for a registered voluntary association in Germany and Austria
- Enterprise Village, an educational program co-managed by the Stavros Institute in Pinellas County, Florida
- Era vulgaris, pseudo-Latin for the Common Era
- EuroVelo, a network of long-distance cycling routes in Europe

== See also ==
- EV1 (disambiguation)
- EVS (disambiguation)
- VE (disambiguation)
- V (disambiguation)
- E (disambiguation)
