= EUR (disambiguation) =

EUR is the ISO 4217 currency code for the Euro, the European Union currency.

EUR may also refer to:

- EUR, Rome, a residential and business district in Rome, Italy
- Eastern Union Railway, a mid-nineteenth century railway company in East Anglia
- Bureau of European and Eurasian Affairs, in the U.S. Department of State
- Erasmus University Rotterdam, in the Netherlands
- Estimated ultimate recovery, or expected ultimate recovery
- EUR.1 movement certificate, for the reduction of import duties (preferential treatment between certain countries)
- EUR-Lex, a service on the official website of the European Union
