= EVL =

EVL may refer to:

- Electronic Visualization Laboratory, at the University of Illinois at Chicago
- Emergency vehicle lighting
- Enah/Vasp-like, a protein
- Enterprise Volleyball League, a Taiwanese volleyball league
- EV Landshut, a German ice hockey league
- E. V. Lucas (1868–1938), English writer
