= EWS =

EWS may refer to:

== Organizations ==
- DB Cargo UK, a British rail freight company that formerly traded as EWS
- East-West Seed, vegetable seed company
- East Woods School, in Oyster Bay Cove, New York
- Elizabeth Woodville School, in Northamptonshire, England
- The Emery/Weiner School, in Houston, Texas
- Environmental Waste Solutions, an American business consulting firm
- Early Warning Services, the parent company of Zelle which is an American digital payments network

== Other uses ==
- Early warning score
- Early warning system
  - Earthquake warning system, a network of seismometers that detect an earthquake already in progress to provide notice of incoming shaking to people further away from the epicenter.
- Economically Weaker Section, in India
- Ewing sarcoma breakpoint region 1, a protein
- EWS Arena, in Göppingen, Germany
- Exchange Web Services, a computer protocol introduced in the Microsoft Exchange Server
