= Italian ship Euro =

Euro has been borne by at least three ships of the Italian Navy and may refer to:

- Italian destroyer Euro (1900), a Lampo-class destroyer launched in 1900, renamed Strale in 1924 and discarded.
- Italian destroyer Euro (1927), a Turbine-class destroyer launched in 1927 and sunk in 1943.
- Italian frigate Euro (F 575), a Maestrale-class frigate launched in 1983.
