= Arm ring =

Ornamental jewellery worn around the upper arm

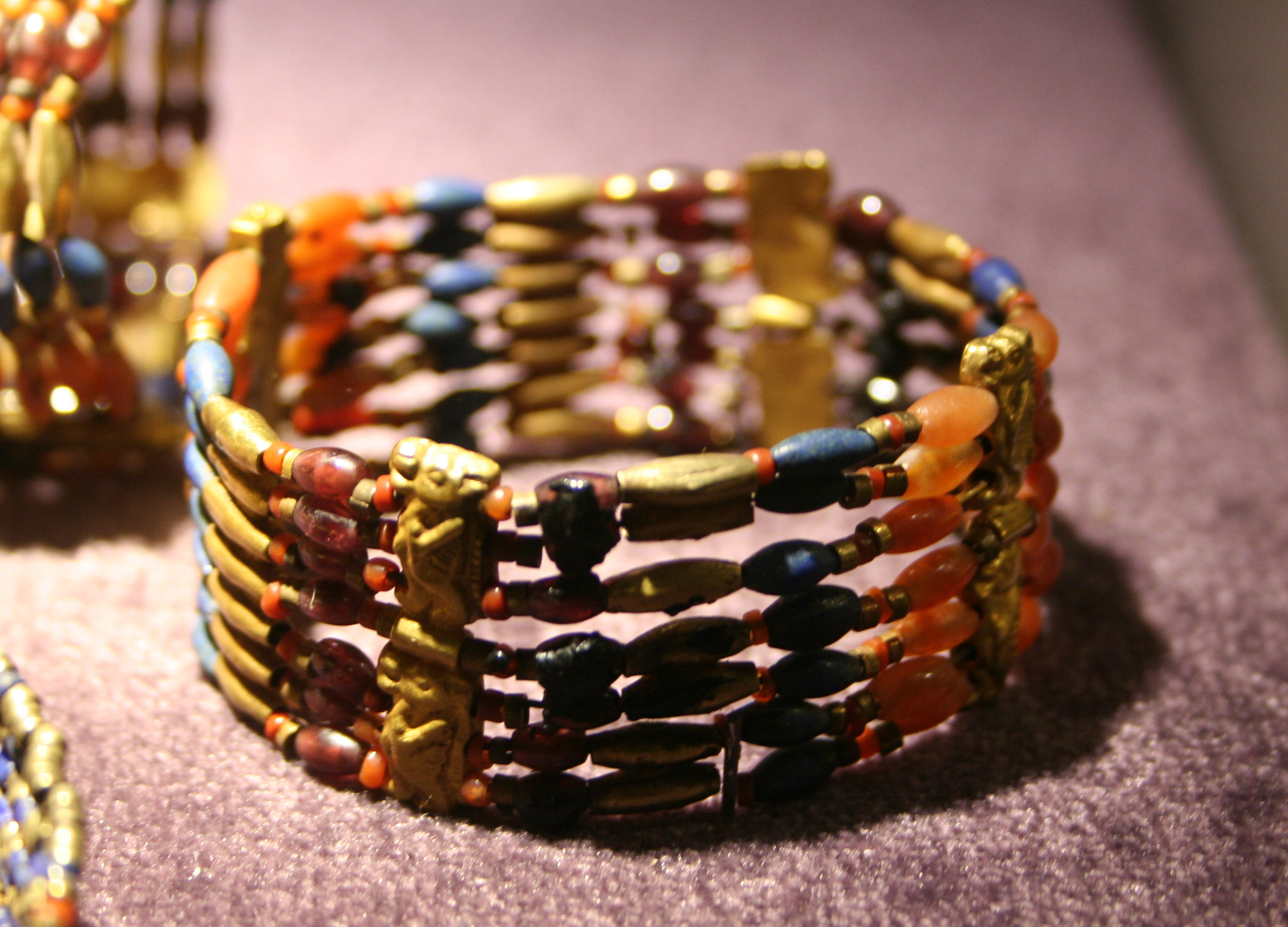
- Nicknames: Armlet
- Location: Arm
- Jewelry: Armilla; Armband; Bicep cuff

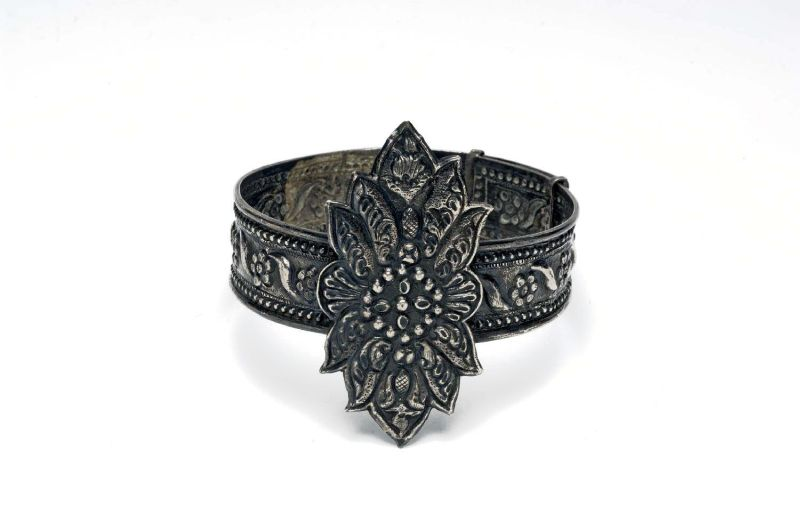
Javanese arm ring used by Wayang wong dancers.

An arm ring, also known as an armlet, is a band of metal, usually a precious metal, worn as jewelry or an ornament around the biceps of the upper arm. The arm ring is similar to a bracelet or bangle, though it must be shaped and sized to fit snugly to the upper arm.

In Indonesia, an arm ring is called kelat bahu; it is commonly used by both men and women as traditional jewelry in Javanese, Sundanese, and Balinese traditional costumes, worn usually in wedding ceremony or in traditional dance. The decorative arm rings are usually made of metals such as gold, silver, or brass, and can trace their history from the Indonesian Hindu-Buddhist past of ancient Java.

Sri Lankan history notes that brides wore armlets to ward off ill luck. However, the armlet can be more eye-catching when it is made of gold or silver and is studded with gems. Men in ancient Sri Lanka also wore the jewellery, and Kandyan drummers can be seen wearing the jewellery as a tradition even today. Women wear arm rings ('Vangi' in Tamil வங்கி) for special occasions like weddings and the Bharatanatyam dance.

Another similar item of jewellery includes a waistlet; these are sometimes referred to as belts.

Modern-day arm rings are generally fashion accessories worn by women.

== European bronze age ==
Often, when the word ring occurs in Bronze-Age and Iron-Age heroic literature it refers to an arm ring, rather than a finger ring. Within the context of the Scandinavian Bronze Age, archaeological excavation of graves suggests that arm rings were most commonly worn by men. Arm rings have also been found in Britain and Ireland, with artifacts dating from the Bronze Age till the Viking Age. Archeological discoveries of Bronze Age arm rings in Denmark suggest they were common Votive offerings during that period, found purposefully deposited in bodies of water or buried near large stones, hills, or barrows. It is believed that arm rings may have been bestowed as gifts by powerful lords to secure or maintain bonds of fealty or Vassalages, with evidence of this practice found in Scandinavian sagas and the Old English epic poem Beowulf. A distinctively decorated set of Danish arm rings within the National Museum of Denmark collection had acquired the name of "oath rings" during the 19th century by archeologists directly connecting those rings to such a practice detailed in the sagas, but they were later dated to the Bronze Age where there was less historical evidence for the giving of arm rings as part of oath making. Arm rings may have also been a method of storing silver during the Viking Age, a context wherein coins were less common. When silver was needed for use, a section of the arm ring would have been cut off, leading to the term hack silver.

Bronze Age "barrel armbands" from the Hallstatt culture have been found made from bronze (sometimes gilded) and jet. Some were apparently never removed from the owner's arm.

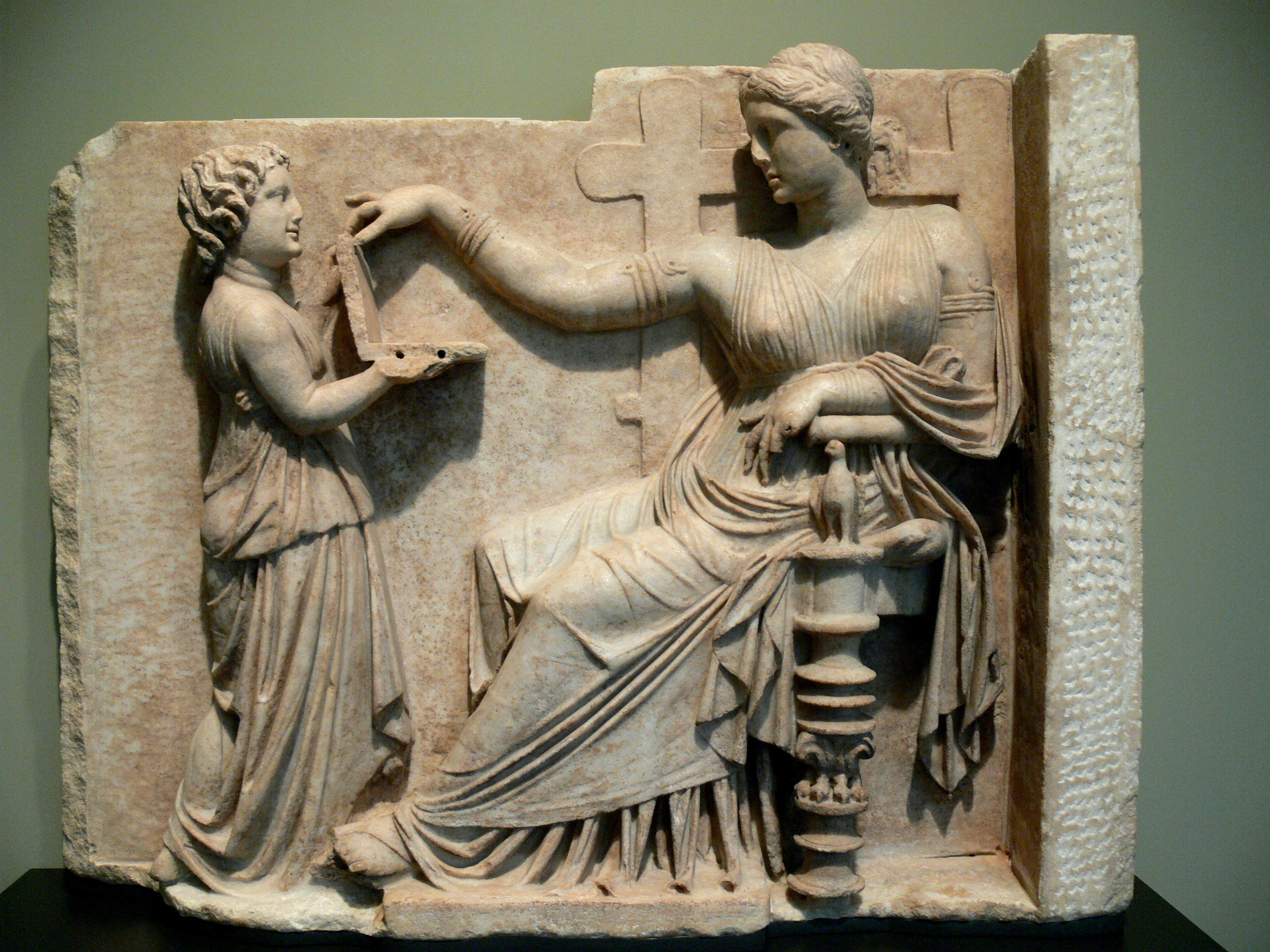
Ancient Greek gravestone of a woman bearing arm rings in the shape of snake, 100 BCE.

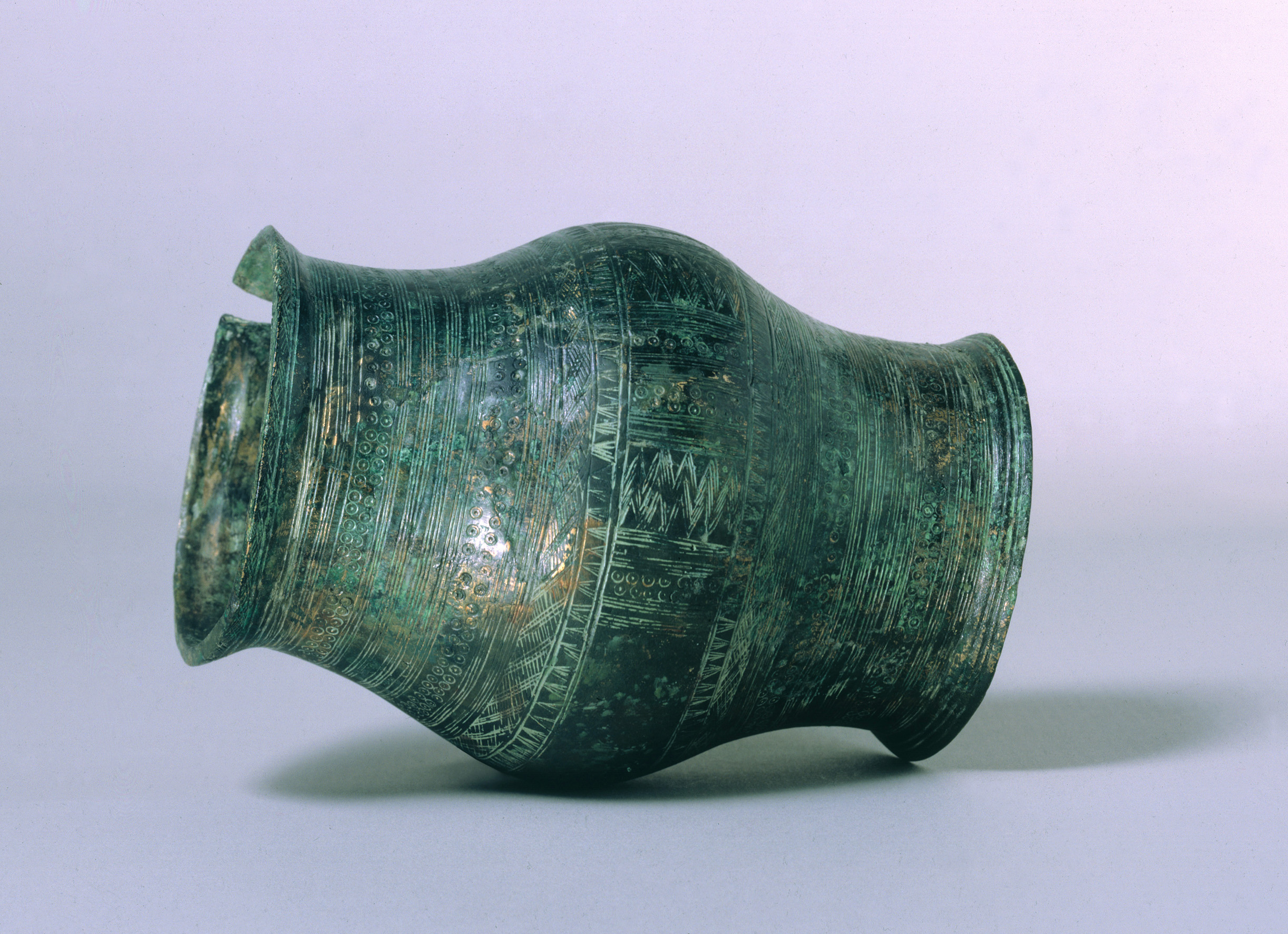
Barrel armband or bracer, 7th-5th century BC

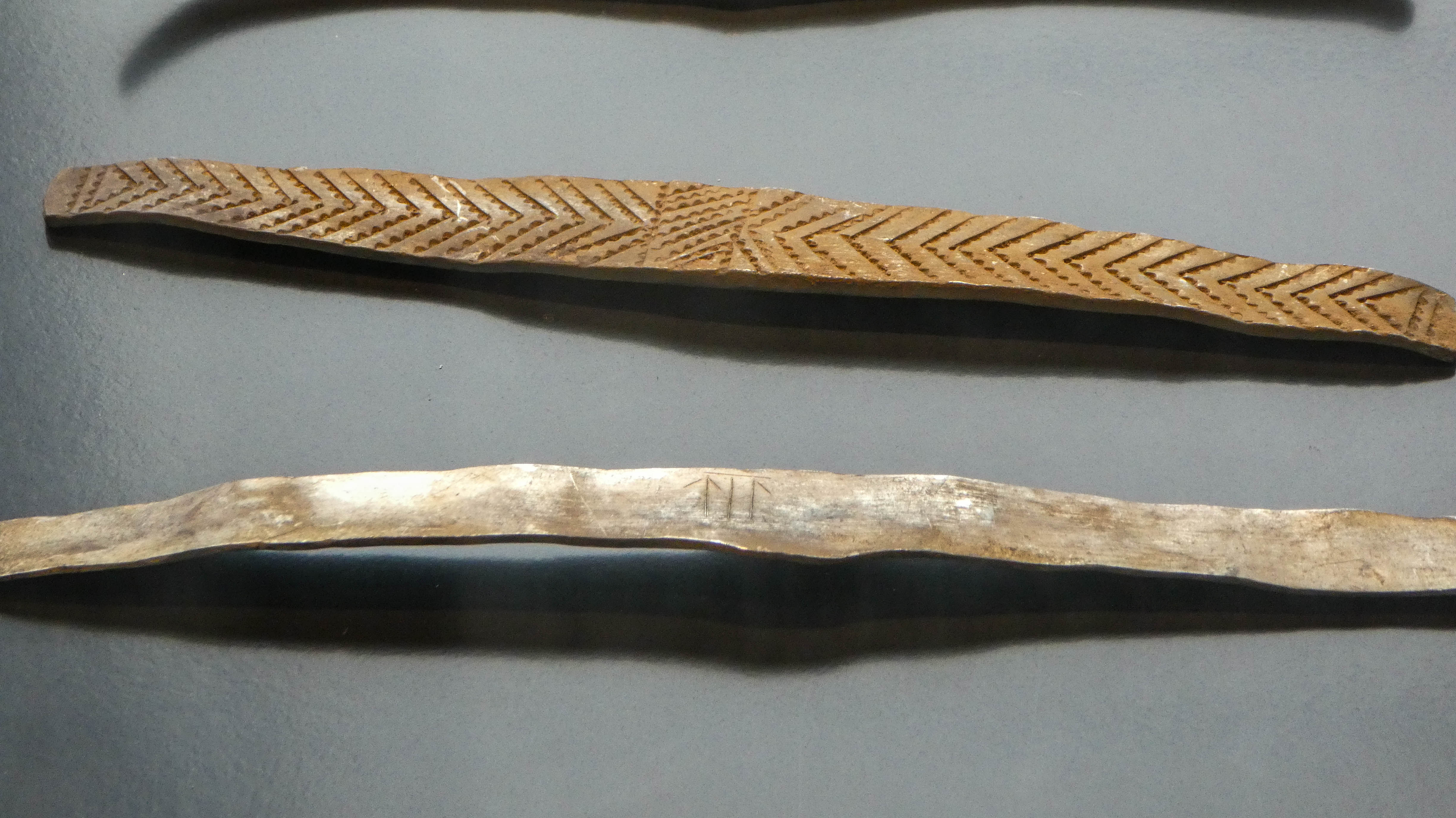
Anglo-Saxon arm rings from the Galloway Hoard, ca. 900 CE.

== See also ==
- Armband
