= EVS =

EVS may refer to:

- Ecks vs. Sever, a 2001 video game
- Electric Vehicle Symposium
- Energie-Versorgung Schwaben, a German energy company, now EnBW
- Enhanced vision system
- Enhanced Voice Services
- European Voluntary Service
- EVS Broadcast Equipment, a Belgian company
- Exposure Value Scale, a photography technique
- Ethan Van Sciver, an American comic artist

== Emergency Voluntary Service groups ==
- Bloodrun EVS, operating primarily in Cleveland and North Yorkshire
- Freewheelers EVS, operating primarily in Bath, Bristol, Gloucestershire (south), Somerset and West Wiltshire

== See also ==
- Variation Selectors (Unicode block) includes Emoji Variation Sequences
