= Evros =

Evros may refer to:

- the Greek name of the Maritsa river running through Bulgaria and forming the land border between Turkey and Greece
- Evros (regional unit), an administrative division in northern Greece
- Evros (constituency), electoral district
