= Europa =

Europa commonly refers to Europe in many languages, and is also the name of a moon of Jupiter. It may also refer to:

== Arts and entertainment ==
=== Broadcasting ===
- Europa FM (Romania)
- Europa FM (Spain)
- Europa Plus, a Russian commercial radio station
- Europa TV, a former consortium of European public service broadcasters

=== Film ===
- Europa (1931 film), a short anti-fascist film
- Europa trilogy, three Danish experimental films
  - Europa (1991 film)
- Europa (2021 film), an Iraqi-Kuwaiti drama
- Europa: The Last Battle, a 2017 Swedish neo-Nazi propaganda film
- Europa Europa, a 1990 historical war drama

=== Gaming ===
- Europa (wargame), a series of wargames that attempted to simulate the entire European campaigns of World War II
- Europa (video game), 2024

=== Literature ===
- Europa (novel), by Tim Parks, 1997
- Europa, a 1972 novel by Romain Gary
- Europa (newspaper), an Italian newspaper
- Europa Magazine, in the Bosnian language in the US

=== Music ===
==== Groups and labels ====
- Europa (musical duo), created by DJ Jax Jones and Martin Solveig in 2019
- Europa (record label), a German record label
- Europa Philharmonie, a symphony orchestra

==== Albums ====
- Europa (Covenant album), 1998
- Europa (Holly Johnson album), and the title song, 2014
- Europa (Ron Korb album), and the title song, 2013
- Europa (Molly Nilsson album), 2009
- Europa (EP), by Diplo, 2019

==== Songs ====
- "Europa (Earth's Cry Heaven's Smile)", by Carlos Santana, 1976
- "Europa", by Blondie from Autoamerican, 1980
- "Europa", by 808 State from Gorgeous, 1993
- "Europa", by Girls' Generation from Mr.Mr., 2014
- "Europa", by Globus, 2006
- "Europa", by Mónica Naranjo from Tarántula, 2008
- "Europa", by Prozzäk from Hot Show, 1998
- "Europa", by Rosetta from The Galilean Satellites, 2005
- "Europa", by Slapp Happy and Henry Cow from Desperate Straights, 1975
- "Europa :(", by Bad Bunny from Nadie Sabe Lo Que Va a Pasar Mañana, 2023

== Businesses ==
- Europa (oil company), in New Zealand
- Europa Capital, a British real estate investment firm
- EuropaCorp, a French film production company
- CBS Europa, a European television channel, now Film Cafe
- Europa Press, a Spanish news agency
- Europa Press (publisher), of Irish poet George Reavey 1932–1939

== People ==
- Europa (mythology), the name of several figures in Greek mythology, including:
  - Europa (consort of Zeus), after whom the continent of Europe is named
- Europa of Macedon (fl. 4th-century BC)
- Madama Europa (Europa Rossi, fl. 1600), opera singer

== Places ==
=== Settlements ===
- Europa (Roman province), within the Diocese of Thrace
- Europa, Missouri, US
- Europa Cliffs, Alexander Island, Antarctica
- Europa Island, in the Mozambique Channel

=== Celestial bodies ===
- 52 Europa, an asteroid

=== Buildings and structures ===
- Europa (Brescia Metro), a station in Italy
- Europa (Seville Metro), a station in Spain
- Europa building, in Brussels, Belgium
- Europa-Center, a building complex in Berlin, Germany
- EuropaCity, a planned development in Paris, France
- Europa Hotel (disambiguation)
- Europa Hut, a Swiss mountain hut
- Europa Tower, Vilnius, Lithuania
- Europa-Park, a theme park in Rust, Germany
- Plaça d'Europa, a square in Barcelona, Spain

== Science and technology ==
- Europa (web portal), of the European Union
- Europa, a model of small engines by Briggs & Stratton
- Europa, a release of Eclipse software

== Sports ==
- CE Europa, a Catalan sports club in Barcelona
- NFL Europa, a 2007 American football competition
- UEFA Europa League, a European football club competition
- Europa F.C., a football club in Gibraltar
  - Europa F.C. Women
- Europa League (Judo)

== Transportation and military ==
=== Aerospace ===
- Europa (rocket), an early expendable launch system project
- Air Europa, a Spanish airline
- Europa Aircraft, a British kit aircraft manufacturer
  - Europa XS, a family of kit aircraft

=== Automobiles ===
- Bizzarrini Europa, a small car 1966–1969
- Lotus Europa, the name of two sports cars
- Europa, a 2009 Tata Nano concept car
- Europa Jeep, a multinational military vehicle project
- NSU-Fiat Europa and Neckar Europa, variants of Fiat 1100

=== Ships ===
- Europa (1781 EIC ship), a British East Indiaman
- Europa (barque), a Dutch tall ship built in 1911
- MS Europa, the name of several ships
- SS Europa, the name of several ships
- HMS Europa, the name of several ships and a shore establishment
- USS Europa, the name of several ships
- Europa (AK-81), a US Army port repair ship
- Europa Batteries, a group of artillery batteries in Gibraltar

== Other uses ==
- Europa (currency), a token coinage issued in 1928
- Europa (wargame), a series of board wargames launched in 1973
- Europa coin programme, collector-oriented legal tender to celebrate European identity
- Europa postage stamp, an annual joint issue of stamps
- European Payments Alliance, abbreviated "EuroPA"

== See also ==
- Evropa (disambiguation)
- Europe (disambiguation)
- The Rape of Europa (disambiguation)
- Europa Point, Gibraltar
- Europa Road, Gibraltar
- Prix Europa, a broadcasting festival
