= Herschel Heights =

Nunataks in southeastern Alexander Island, Antarctica

The Herschel Heights (71°53′S 69°38′W) are a complex of nunataks of which Mimas Peak on the east is the highest, located southwest of the Enceladus Nunataks and near the head of Saturn Glacier in southeastern Alexander Island, Antarctica. The eastern part of this feature was photographed by Lincoln Ellsworth, November 23, 1935, in the course of his trans-Antarctic flight and was plotted from the air photos by W.L.G. Joerg. The heights were named by the UK Antarctic Place-Names Committee from association with Mimas and Enceladus, after Sir William Herschel, the British astronomer who discovered these two satellites of Saturn in 1789.

== See also ==
- Debussy Heights
- Sutton Heights
