= Titan Nunatak =

Titan Nunatak (72°9′S 68°43′W) is a broad, rather flat-topped nunatak, rising to about 460 m, standing between Coal Nunatak and Tethys Nunataks in the southeast corner of Alexander Island, Antarctica. The nunatak was first sighted and photographed from the air by Lincoln Ellsworth on November 23, 1935, and mapped from photos obtained on that flight by W.L.G. Joerg. Observed from the northwest (the direction from which Ellsworth photographed this nunatak), only the summit protrudes above the coastal ice, and it was uncertain whether this was a Peak on Alexander Island or an island in George VI Sound. Its true nature was determined by the Falkland Islands Dependencies Survey who surveyed this nunatak in 1949. Named by the United Kingdom Antarctic Place-Names Committee for its association with nearby Saturn Glacier, Titan being one of the satellites of the planet Saturn, the sixth planet of the Solar System.

== See also ==
- Ablation Point
- Belemnite Point
- Coal Nunatak
- Pagoda Ridge
- Triton Point
