= Vesta Nunataks =

The Vesta Nunataks (71°18′S 68°42′W) is a small group of nunataks rising to about 1,200 m, lying between Grikurov Ridge in the LeMay Range and Aeolus Ridge in Planet Heights, situated near the east coast of Alexander Island, Antarctica. In association with the names of planets and their satellites in this area, they were named after Vesta, an asteroid that lies between the orbits of Mars and Jupiter. They were named by United Kingdom Antarctic Place-Names Committee in 1987.

== See also ==
- Caninus Nunatak
- Horsa Nunataks
- Recluse Nunatak
