= Galileo Cliffs =

The Galileo Cliffs (70°46′S 68°45′W) are a line of east–west cliffs, 5 nautical miles (9 km) long, standing between Grotto Glacier and Jupiter Glacier, 7 nautical miles (13 km) west of Ablation Point, in eastern Alexander Island, Antarctica. They were mapped from trimetrogon air photography taken by the Ronne Antarctic Research Expedition, 1947–48, and from survey by the Falkland Islands Dependencies Survey, 1948–50. They were named by the UK Antarctic Place-Names Committee from association with Jupiter Glacier after Galileo Galilei, the Italian astronomer who discovered the Galilean moons, the four named satellites of Jupiter (1564-1642).

== See also ==
- Europa Cliffs
- Keystone Cliffs
- Succession Cliffs
