= Hall Cliff =

Hall Cliff (71°59′S 68°37′W) is a sandstone cliff 1 nautical mile (2 km) long, located along the south side of Saturn Glacier and 1 nautical mile west of Citadel Bastion in eastern Alexander Island, Antarctica. The feature was mapped from trimetrogon air photography taken by the Ronne Antarctic Research Expedition, 1947–48, and from survey by the Falkland Islands Dependencies Survey, 1948–50. It was named by the UK Antarctic Place-Names Committee from association with Saturn Glacier after Asaph Hall, the American astronomer who contributed toward the study of Saturn and also discovered the satellites of the planet Mars.

== See also ==
- Corner Cliffs
- Cannonball Cliffs
- Two Step Cliffs
