= Utopia Glacier =

Glacier in Antarctica

Utopia Glacier (71°51′S 68°16′W) is a glacier in Antarctica encircled by Mariner Hill, Syrtis Hill, Natal Ridge, and Ares Cliff; the feature was named for Utopia Planitia on the planet Mars, which was the landing site of the NASA Viking 2 Lander Mission on 3 September 1976. This name was applied to the feature by members of the Mars Oasis Party who were searching for life on the glacier, much in the same manner as the satellite was on the planet Mars.
