= Bandstone Block =

Block of sandstone on Alexander Island, Antarctica

- Block of sandstone
- Location within Antarctica
- Coordinates: 71°40′S 68°12′W
- Location: Alexander Island, Antarctica
- Etymology: Its conspicuous sedimentary bands

Bandstone Block (71°40′S 68°12′W) is an almost rectangular block of sandstone in eastern Alexander Island, Antarctica. It rises to about 300 metres (1,000 ft) 2 nautical miles (4 km) north of Triton Point at the mouth of Venus Glacier. The coast in this vicinity was first seen from the air by Lincoln Ellsworth on November 23, 1935, and roughly mapped from photos obtained on that flight by W.L.G. Joerg. This feature was first surveyed in 1949 by the Falkland Islands Dependencies Survey, who named it because of its conspicuous sedimentary bands.

== See also ==
- Horrocks Block
- Rhea Corner
