= Himalia Ridge =

Ridge in Antarctica

Coordinates: 70°50′S 68°27′W

Himalia Ridge is a ridge running east–west on the north side of the Ganymede Heights massif, north-east of Jupiter Glacier, in the east of Alexander Island, Antarctica. It was photographed from the air by the Ronne Antarctic Research Expedition in 1947 and mapped from these photographs by D. Searle of the Falkland Islands Dependencies Survey in 1960. The ridge was named by the UK Antarctic Place-Names Committee following British Antarctic Survey geological work, 1983–84, after Himalia, a satellite of the planet Jupiter, in association with Jupiter Glacier. The site lies within Antarctic Specially Protected Area (ASPA) No.147.

Himalia Ridge is the namesake and type locality of the Cretaceous Himalia Ridge Formation. Its type section exposes a complete 2.2 km (1.4 mi) thick sequence of the Himalia Ridge Formation that dips southeast at about 30 degrees. At the western end of the section, easterly-directed thrust faults repeat the upper 420 m (1,380 ft) of this formation. In its type section, the upper 1.1 km (0.68 mi) of the Himalia Ridge Formation is composed of four separate, cliff-forming, conglomerate-dominated paleochannel fills that range in thickness from 80 to 170 m (260 to 560 ft). Each of the paleochannel fill consists of basal scoured, clast-supported, graded conglomerate beds overlain by 10 to 40 m (33 to 131 ft) of sandstone beds that fine-upwards. Interbedded and separating the paleochannel fills are mudstones; thinly interbedded sandstones and siltstones; thick-bedded sandstones and pebbly mudstones. In the type section, the lower 1.1 km (0.68 mi) of the Himalia Ridge Formation consists of mudstone that forms distinctive, recessive slopes. The basal 30 m (98 ft) of this strata consist predominately of black mudstones; subordinate, channelled, mudflake breccias; and rare, isolated slump sheets. Overlying these strata, the remainder of this lower interval consists of dark mudstone thinly-interbedded with subordinate fine-grained sandstone beds 1 to 10 cm (0.39 to 3.94 in) thick) and rare coarser-grained volcaniclastic sand feldspathic channelled sandstones.

The Himalia Ridge Formation is part of 4 km thick sequence of deep and shallow water and coastal plain strata that outcrops in a belt that is 250 km (160 mi) long by 30 km (19 mi) wide on the eastern coast of Alexander Island, Antarctica. These sediments accumulated within a Middle Jurassic to Lower Cretaceous forearc basin that lay adjacent to a contemporaneous volcanic arc that occupied the position the modern Antarctic Peninsula. Himalia Ridge Formation was deposited in this basin by submarine fans sourced from the nearby volcanic arc.

== See also ==
- Ablation Point
- Arenite Ridge
- Belemnite Point
- Phobos Ridge
- Polarstar Ridge
