= Offset Ridge =

Ridge in Antarctica

Offset Ridge (71°41′S 68°32′W) is a ridge extending west from Triton Point lying between Venus Glacier and Neptune Glacier in eastern Alexander Island, Antarctica. The ridge was mapped by Directorate of Overseas Surveys from satellite imagery by U.S. National Aeronautics and Space Administration in cooperation with U.S. Geological Survey. The ridge is kinked in the middle and is effectively formed of two ridges offset from one another; thus, the descriptive name applied by United Kingdom Antarctic Place-Names Committee (UK-APC).

== See also ==
- Aeolus Ridge
- Deimos Ridge
- Leda Ridge
