= Juno Peaks =

Mountains in Antarctica

The Juno Peaks (71°58′S 69°47′W) are two steep-sided nunataks with a small rock to the west, forming part of an east–west ridge 6 nautical miles (11 km) southwest of Mimas Peak, lying near the head of Saturn Glacier in southern Alexander Island, Antarctica. They were mapped from trimetrogon air photography taken by the Ronne Antarctic Research Expedition, 1947–48, and from the survey by the Falkland Islands Dependencies Survey, 1948–50. The nunataks were named by the UK Antarctic Place-Names Committee after Juno, one of the asteroids lying between the orbits of the planets Mars and Jupiter.

== See also ==
- Caninus Nunatak
- Emerald Nunatak
- Hyperion Nunataks
