= Pagoda Ridge =

Ridge in Antarctica

Coordinates: 71°53′S 68°33′W

Pagoda Ridge is a ridge with a small peak resembling a pagoda at the summit, located between Phobos Ridge and Deimos Ridge on the north side of Saturn Glacier, in southeast Alexander Island, Antarctica. The feature was mapped from trimetrogon air photography taken by the Ronne Antarctic Research Expedition, during 1947 and 1948, and from surveying by the Falkland Islands Dependencies Survey, 1948–50. This descriptive name was applied by the United Kingdom Antarctic Place-Names Committee.

== See also ==
- Ablation Point
- Belemnite Point
- Coal Nunatak
- Titan Nunatak
- Triton Point
