= Tombaugh Cliffs =

Group of ice-free cliffs on the east side of Alexander Island, Antarctica

Tombaugh Cliffs (71°5′S 68°18′W) is a group of ice-free cliffs which stand at the north side of the mouth of Pluto Glacier and face towards the George VI Ice Shelf which occupies George VI Sound, on the east side of Alexander Island, Antarctica. Photographed from the air by the Ronne Antarctic Research Expedition in 1947–48; surveyed by Falkland Islands Dependencies Survey from 1948 to 1950. The naming by the United Kingdom Antarctic Place-Names Committee continues the astronomy related or celestial theme displayed in the toponymy of this area. The cliffs were named for Clyde Tombaugh (1906-1997), an American astronomer who studied at Lowell Observatory and who first discovered the dwarf planet Pluto in 1930.

== See also ==
- Cannonball Cliffs
- Corner Cliffs
- Succession Cliffs
