= Striation Valley =

Valley in Antarctica

Coordinates: 70°53′S 68°23′W

Striation Valley is a valley trending south-east towards George VI Sound, lying immediately north of Jupiter Glacier, near the east coast of Alexander Island, Antarctica. The valley was first surveyed by a field party from the Department of Geography at the University of Aberdeen, with British Antarctic Survey support, in 1978–79. The name derives from glacial striations found on rocks in the valley. The site lies within Antarctic Specially Protected Area (ASPA) No.147. In 2001, a continuous stand of approximately 1600 m 2 of Antarctic bryophyte vegetation was recorded on moist slopes in lower Striation Valley.

== See also ==
- Ablation Valley
- Moutonnée Valley
- Viking Valley
