= Flatiron Valley =

Valley in Antarctica

Coordinates: 70°54′S 68°29′W

Flatiron Valley is a north-south valley including a sub-glacial lake, located in the south part of the Ganymede Heights, marginal to Jupiter Glacier, situated in eastern Alexander Island, Antarctica. The name derives from field work in 1978–79 by the Department of Geography, University of Aberdeen, Scotland, with British Antarctic Survey support. It was named from the triangular slope facets between prominent gullies on the west side of the valley. The site lies within Antarctic Specially Protected Area (ASPA) No.147.

== See also ==
- Ablation Valley
- Erratic Valley
- Viking Valley
