= Milky Way (Antarctica) =

Mountain pass in Antarctica

Coordinates: 71°11′S 68°55′W

The Milky Way is a col (a gap between two mountain peaks) situated between the southernmost extremity of the LeMay Range and the Planet Heights mountain range, in the eastern part of Alexander Island, Antarctica. It is the highest point on a possible sledging route between Jupiter Glacier and Uranus Glacier. The col was first mapped from air photos taken by the Ronne Antarctic Research Expedition in 1947–48, by D. Searle of the Falkland Islands Dependencies Survey in 1960. It was named after the Milky Way by the UK Antarctic Place-Names Committee from association with the nearby Planet Heights and the glaciers which are named for the planets of the Solar System.
