= Lunar Crag =

Lunar Crag (71°8′S 68°42′W) is one of the rock-exposed summits within the Planet Heights mountain range, rising to about 1,200 metres (4,000 ft) at the head of Pluto Glacier on the east side of Alexander Island, Antarctica. It was photographed from the air by the Ronne Antarctic Research Expedition, 1947–48, and mapped from these photographs by D. Searle of the Falkland Islands Dependencies Survey in 1960. The crag was named by the UK Antarctic Place-Names Committee in 1977 in association with nearby landforms named after planets and satellites of the Solar System; other examples include Phobos Ridge and Jupiter Glacier.
