= Natal Ridge =

Coordinates: 71°50′S 68°18′W

Natal Ridge is a prominent snow-free terraced ridge forming part of the north boundary of the Two Step Cliffs massif located in the southeast portion of Alexander Island, Antarctica. Named by United Kingdom Antarctic Place-Names Committee (UK-APC) in 1993 in recognition of the geomorphological and biological surveys conducted by scientists from the University of Natal in the Mars Glacier party.

== See also ==
- Balan Ridge
- Phobos Ridge
- Polarstar Ridge
