= Selene Nunatak =

Mountain in Antarctica

Selene Nunatak (71°8′S 68°48′W) is a nunatak (an exposed, often rocky element of a ridge, mountain, or peak not covered with ice or snow) rising to about 1,200 m west of Lunar Crag, situated within the mountain range Planet Heights, in eastern Alexander Island, Antarctica. The nunatak was named in association with nearby Lunar Crag by the United Kingdom Antarctic Place-Names Committee in 1988 after Selene, the Greek goddess of the Moon.

== See also ==
- Admirals Nunatak
- Figaro Nunatak
- Lizard Nunatak
