= Atoll Nunataks =

Atoll Nunataks (71°21′S 68°47′W) is a group of nunataks on the north side of Uranus Glacier, 3 miles (5 km) west of Mount Ariel, in eastern Alexander Island, Antarctica. They were mapped from trimetrogon air photography taken by the Ronne Antarctic Research Expedition, 1947–48, and from survey by the Falkland Islands Dependencies Survey, 1948–50, and so named by the UK Antarctic Place-Names Committee, because of the arrangement of the suntans in a ring, like an atoll.

== See also ==
- Adams Nunatak
- Hesperus Nunatak
- Coal Nunatak
