= Waitabit Cliffs =

Cliffs in Antarctica

Waitabit Cliffs (71°31′S 68°14′W) is a line of sedimentary cliffs on the east coast of Alexander Island, Antarctica, which faces east onto George VI Sound and extends 3 nautical miles (6 km) north from the mouth of Mercury Glacier. The cliffs were probably first sighted by Lincoln Ellsworth, who flew directly over it and photographed segments of this coast on November 23, 1935. First roughly surveyed in 1936 by the British Graham Land Expedition. Resurveyed in 1949 by the Falkland Islands Dependencies Survey, at which time the rock strata were independently examined by members of the party at two different points, an important investigation causing the delay which gave rise to the name.

== See also ==
- Cannonball Cliffs
- Corner Cliffs
- Succession Cliffs

    https://7r6.com/EC13
