= Dione Nunataks =

The Dione Nunataks (71°56′S 69°6′W) are rock exposures at the head of Saturn Glacier, 9 nautical miles (17 km) west of Deimos Ridge in the southeastern part of Alexander Island, Antarctica. The nunataks appear to have been first seen from the air by Lincoln Ellsworth on November 23, 1935, and roughly mapped from photos obtained on that flight by W.L.G. Joerg. They were remapped from air photos taken by the Ronne Antarctic Research Expedition, 1947–48, by D. Searle of the Falkland Islands Dependencies Survey in 1960, and were named by the UK Antarctic Place-Names Committee from association with Saturn Glacier, Dione being one of the satellites of the planet Saturn.

== See also ==
- Franck Nunataks
- Geode Nunataks
- Pickering Nunataks
