= Grikurov Ridge =

Grikurov Ridge (71°17′S 69°0′W) is a ridge that extends westward for about 6 nautical miles (11 km) from the south end of the LeMay Range, in central Alexander Island, Antarctica. The feature was mapped from trimetrogon air photography taken by the Ronne Antarctic Research Expedition, 1947–48, and from a survey by the Falkland Islands Dependencies Survey, 1948–50. The UK Antarctic Place-Names Committee named it for the Russian Garrik Grikurov, a Soviet exchange geologist with the British Antarctic Survey, who worked there in 1963–64.

== See also ==
- Offset Ridge
- Pagoda Ridge
- Polarstar Ridge
