= Secret Lake =

Body of water on Alexander Island, Antarctica

- Location within Antarctica
- Location: Antarctica
- Coordinates: 71.8333333°S 68.35°W
- Type: lake

Secret Lake is a meltwater lake 2 miles (3.2 km) west of Ares Cliff, near the east coast of Alexander Island in Antarctica.

== Description ==
The lake is situated in a north-west facing glacial cirque and is fed from an area of stagnant ice. It lies 100 metres (330 ft) above the east edge of Mars Glacier and is visible only from the cirque or from the air. The lake was first mapped by Directorate of Overseas Surveys from satellite imagery supplied by the United States National Aeronautics and Space Administration in cooperation with the United States Geological Survey. The name by United Kingdom Antarctic Place-Names Committee refers to the secluded and isolated location of the lake.

== See also ==
- Ablation Lake
- Lake Hodgson
- Moutonnee Lake
