= Syrtis Hill =

Syrtis Hill (71°50′S 68°20′W) is a prominent snow-free conical terraced hill, rising to about 500 m, on the northwest corner of the Two Step Cliffs massif overlooking Viking Valley, in the southeast portion of Alexander Island, Antarctica. The hill is an important snow-free landmark and the site of biological and geological research. Named by United Kingdom Antarctic Place-Names Committee in 1993 after Syrtis Major Planum, the prominent dark feature on the planet Mars, first described by the Dutch astronomer Huygens in 1659. This hill was most likely named in association with nearby Mars Glacier and Planet Heights.

== See also ==
- Mariner Hill
