= Iapetus Nunatak =

Nunatak on Alexander Island, Antarctica

Iapetus Nunatak (71°36′S 70°15′W) is an isolated nunatak at the southwest margin of Satellite Snowfield, about midway between the Walton Mountains and the Staccato Peaks in southern Alexander Island, Antarctica. It was mapped by the Directorate of Overseas Surveys from satellite imagery supplied by the U.S. National Aeronautics and Space Administration in cooperation with the U.S. Geological Survey, and was named by the UK Antarctic Place-Names Committee from association with Saturn Glacier (nearby to the east), after Iapetus, one of the satellites of Saturn.

== See also ==
- Appalachia Nunataks
- Franck Nunataks
- Hyperion Nunataks
- Enceladus Nunataks
