= Zebra Ridge =

Ridge in Antarctica

Zebra Ridge (70°2′S 69°14′W) is a prominent rock ridge, extending to about 2 miles (3.2 km) in length, situated 3 miles (4.8 km) south of the mouth of Tumble Glacier where it rises 760 m above the Roberts Ice Piedmont of east Alexander Island, Antarctica. The ridge was first sighted from a distance by Lincoln Ellsworth, who photographed the nearby Douglas Range from the air on November 23, 1935. First surveyed in 1948 by the Falkland Islands Dependencies Survey and so named because of the striped appearance of the rock strata.

== See also ==
- Deimos Ridge
- Phobos Ridge
- Polarstar Ridge
