= Europa Cliffs =

The Europa Cliffs (70°52′S 68°45′W) are a group of interconnected hills and rock ridges on the west side of Jupiter Glacier in eastern Alexander Island, Antarctica. They were mapped from trimetrogon air photography taken by the Ronne Antarctic Research Expedition, 1947–48, and from survey by the Falkland Islands Dependencies Survey, 1948–50. They were named by the UK Antarctic Place-Names Committee from association with Jupiter Glacier after Europa, one of the satellites of the planet Jupiter.

== See also ==
- Cannonball Cliffs
- Corner Cliffs
- Two Step Cliffs
