= Ares Cliff =

Cliff in Antarctica

Ares Cliff (71°49′S 68°15′W) is a cliff in Antarctica. It is formed of pale-colored sandstone and rises to about 500 metres (1,600 ft) east of Mars Glacier and 1 nautical mile (2 km) north of Two Step Cliffs on the east side of Alexander Island. It was mapped from trimetrogon air photography taken by the Ronne Antarctic Research Expedition, 1947–48, and from survey by the Falkland Islands Dependencies Survey, 1948–50, and named by the UK Antarctic Place-Names Committee in association with Mars Glacier after the Greek god of war, Ares.

== See also ==
- Georgian Cliff
- Hall Cliff
