= Mount Ariel =

Mountain on Alexander Island, Antarctica

- Location within Antarctica

Highest point
- Elevation: 1,250 m (4,100 ft)
- Coordinates: 71°22′S 68°40′W

Geography
- Location: Alexander Island, Antarctica
- Parent range: Planet Heights

Mount Ariel is a peak, 1,250 m, marking the south limit of Planet Heights and overlooking the north side of Uranus Glacier in the east part of Alexander Island. The peak lies 3 miles (5 km) east of Atoll Nunataks. Probably first seen by Lincoln Ellsworth, who flew directly over it and photographed segments of this coast on November 23, 1935. First mapped from air photos taken by the Ronne Antarctic Research Expedition (RARE), 1947–48, by Searle of the Falkland Islands Dependencies Survey (FIDS) in 1960. So named by the United Kingdom Antarctic Place-Names Committee (UK-APC) because of its association with Uranus Glacier, Ariel being one of the satellites of Uranus.

== See also ==
- Mount Bayonne
- Mount Liszt
