= Rhea Corner =

Rock formation in Antarctica

Rhea Corner (71°53′S 68°48′W) is a triangular area of exposed rock lying on the north side of Saturn Glacier in southeastern Alexander Island, Antarctica. The feature is a promontory at the west end of the massif that includes the Deimos, Pagoda and Phobos Ridge. A cliff on the north face is about 500 m high. It was mapped by the Directorate of Overseas Surveys from satellite imagery supplied by the U.S. National Aeronautics and Space Administration in cooperation with the U.S. Geological Survey, and named by the United Kingdom Antarctic Place-Names Committee (UK-APC) in association with nearby Saturn Glacier, Rhea being one of the satellites of the planet Saturn, the sixth planet of the Solar System.
