= Horrocks Block =

Outcrop that is composed mainly of sandstone

Horrocks Block (71°35′S 68°22′W) is a large rectangular outcrop that is composed mainly of sandstone, lying on the north side of Venus Glacier, 2 nautical miles (4 km) southwest of the Keystone Cliffs, on the east side of Alexander Island, Antarctica. It was mapped by the Directorate of Overseas Surveys from satellite imagery supplied by the U.S. National Aeronautics and Space Administration in cooperation with the U.S. Geological Survey, and was named by the UK Antarctic Place-Names Committee from association with Venus Glacier after Jeremiah Horrocks, the British astronomer who predicted and first observed a transit of Venus, in 1639.

Horrocks Block seems to have some relation with nearby Bandstone Block, they appear to be both large rectangular outcrops of sandstone.
