= Quaver Nunatak =

Nunatak on Alexander Island, Antarctica

Quaver Nunatak (71°0′S 70°17′W) is a small nunatak rising to about 250 m, lying in the northernmost exposure of the Walton Mountains, situated in the central portion of Alexander Island, Antarctica. The site was so named by the United Kingdom Antarctic Place-Names Committee in 1977 after the musical term, reflecting the small size of the feature and in association with the names of composers in this area.

== See also ==
- Emerald Nunatak
- Franck Nunataks
- Vesta Nunataks
