= Triton Point =

Headland in Antarctica

Triton Point (71°42′S 68°12′W) is a rocky headland at the east end of the high ridge separating Venus Glacier and Neptune Glacier on the east coast of Alexander Island, Antarctica. Lincoln Ellsworth first observed the coast in this vicinity from the air by on 23 November 1935, and it was roughly mapped from photos obtained on that flight by W.L.G. Joerg. The British Graham Land Expedition roughly surveyed Triton Point in 1936 by the Falkland Islands Dependencies Survey more accurately defined it in 1949. The United Kingdom Antarctic Place-Names Committee named it for its association with nearby Neptune Glacier, Triton being one of the satellites of the planet Neptune, the eighth planet of the Solar System.

== Geology ==
Triton Point is the type locality of the Triton Point Member of the Neptune Glacier Formation. At Triton Point, the fluvial sedimentary strata of this member of the Neptune Glacier Formation contains numerous, well preserved Cretaceous plant fossils, including rare, high-latitude (about 74° degrees paleolatitude), fossil forests composed of in situ, upright standing, fossil tree trunks. Because the non-marine Triton Point Member is overlain and underlain by fossiliferous marine strata, the age of the upright standing, fossil tree trunks can be determined to be late Albian age.

== See also ==
- Ablation Point
- Belemnite Point
- Coal Nunatak
- Pagoda Ridge
- Titan Nunatak
