= Erratic Valley =

Valley on Alexander Island, Antarctica

Coordinates: 70°47′S 68°25′W

Erratic Valley is a short valley on Alexander Island, Antarctica, that joins Ablation Valley from the north. It was named from the large number of erratic igneous blocks observed in the valley by a University of Aberdeen field party which mapped the area in 1978–79. The site lies within Antarctic Specially Protected Area (ASPA) No.147.

== See also ==
- Flatiron Valley
- Moutonnée Valley
- Viking Valley
