= Leda Ridge =

Leda Ridge (70°52′S 68°32′W) is a ridge running in a northeast–southwest direction lying on the west side of the Ganymede Heights, east of Jupiter Glacier, on the east side of Alexander Island, Antarctica. The ridge was photographed from the air by the Ronne Antarctic Research Expedition in 1947 and was mapped from the photographs by the Falkland Islands Dependencies Survey in 1960. It was named by the UK Antarctic Place-Names Committee after Leda, a satellite of the planet Jupiter, in association with nearby Jupiter Glacier.

== See also ==
- Balan Ridge
- Phobos Ridge
- Probe Ridge
