= Huns Nunatak =

Huns Nunatak (71°25′S 69°1′W) is a nunatak rising to about 950 metres (3,120 ft) in the center of the Milky Way, a mountain pass between the LeMay Range and the Planet Heights, in the central portion of Alexander Island, Antarctica. The name originates from dog teams named "The Huns" that served at various British stations in Antarctica, 1961–74, and honors the loyal service of all Falkland Islands Dependencies Survey/British Antarctic Survey sled dogs. Huns Nunatak seems to bear some relation to Admirals Nunatak, which lies about 6 kilometres (3.7 mi) to the southwest, considering they are both named after a team of sled dogs.
