= Tethys Nunataks =

Tethys Nunataks (72°10′S 68°59′W) is a minor group of about five snow-free nunataks, lying 2 nautical miles (3.7 km) northeast of Stephenson Nunatak in the southeast corner of Alexander Island, Antarctica. Presumably first seen by Finn Ronne and Carl R. Eklund of the United States Antarctic Service who sledged through George VI Sound in 1940–41. Surveyed in 1949 by the Falkland Islands Dependencies Survey and named by the United Kingdom Antarctic Place-Names Committee for association with nearby Saturn Glacier, Tethys being one of the satellites of the planet Saturn, the sixth planet of the Solar System.

== See also ==
- Astraea Nunatak
- Figaro Nunatak
- Hesperus Nunatak
