= Nonplus Crag =

Rock cliff in Antarctica

Nonplus Crag (70°58′S 69°10′W) is a prominent rock cliff, 1,250 m, in the LeMay Range, near the head of Jupiter Glacier in the E-central part of Alexander Island, Antarctica. First photographed from the air on November 23, 1935, by Lincoln Ellsworth and mapped from these photos by W.L.G. Joerg. Remapped from air photos taken by the Ronne Antarctic Research Expedition (RARE), 1947–48, by Searle of the Falkland Islands Dependencies Survey (FIDS) in 1960. Name given by the United Kingdom Antarctic Place-Names Committee (UK-APC) is descriptive of the perplexity which arose over FIDS identification of the feature.
