= Probe Ridge =

Probe Ridge (71°50′S 68°21′W) is a prominent, snow-free, terraced ridge forming part of the north flank of Viking Valley, situated in the southeast portion of Alexander Island, Antarctica. The ridge was named by the United Kingdom Antarctic Place-Names Committee (UK-APC) in 1993 after the space probe which surveyed the planet Mars in 1976.

== See also ==
- Aeolus Ridge
- Leda Ridge
- Polarstar Ridge
