= Pickering Nunataks =

Group of nunataks in Antarctica

Pickering Nunataks (71°49′S 68°57′W) is a group of nunataks lying 2 nautical miles (3.7 km) southwest of Mount Phoebe and on the northeast side of Saturn Glacier, near the east coast of Alexander Island, Antarctica. The nunataks were photographed by Lincoln Ellsworth on November 23, 1935, in the course of a trans-Antarctic flight and were plotted from the air photos by W.L.G. Joerg. Named by United Kingdom Antarctic Place-Names Committee (UK-APC) from association with Saturn Glacier after William H. Pickering (1858–1938), the American astronomer who discovered Phoebe, one of the satellites of the planet Saturn, the sixth planet of the Solar System.

== See also ==
- Dione Nunataks
- Gannon Nunataks
- Hyperion Nunataks
