= Keystone Cliffs =

The Keystone Cliffs (71°35′S 68°13′W) are a set of cliffs, 610 metres (2,000 ft) high, marking the east face of the sedimentary ridge between Mercury Glacier and Venus Glacier, on the east coast of Alexander Island, Antarctica. The coast in this vicinity was first seen from the air by Lincoln Ellsworth on November 23, 1935, and roughly mapped from photos obtained on that flight by W.L.G. Joerg. The cliffs were roughly surveyed in 1936 by the British Graham Land Expedition and resurveyed in 1948 by the Falkland Islands Dependencies Survey (FIDS). They were so named by the FIDS because the geologic structures revealed in these cliffs provided the key to the general tectonic structure of the area.

== See also ==
- Cannonball Cliffs
- Corner Cliffs
- Two Step Cliffs
