= Kuiper Scarp =

Location of Kuiper Scarp in Alexander Island, Antarctica

Kuiper Scarp (71°26′S 68°27′W) is an east–west escarpment running along the south face of Uranus Glacier on the east side of Alexander Island, Antarctica. The scarp was photographed by Lincoln Ellsworth, November 23, 1935, in the course of a trans-Antarctic flight and was plotted from the photos by W.L.G. Joerg.

It was named by the UK Antarctic Place-Names Committee from association with Uranus Glacier after Gerard Kuiper, the Dutch-American astronomer who in 1948 discovered Miranda, one of the satellites of the planet Uranus.
