= Iapetus (disambiguation) =

Iapetus (Ancient Greek: Ἰαπετός; also Japetus, Iapetos) is a Titan god in Greek mythology.

Iapetus /aɪˈæpɪtəs/ or Japetus, may also refer to:

== Places ==
- Iapetus (moon) (also 'Japetus'), one of the planet Saturn's moons, named for the mythological Titan
- Iapetus Ocean, an ancient ocean between the paleocontinents Laurentia and Baltica
- Iapetus suture, line of closure of the Iapetus Ocean
- Iapetus Nunatak (Iapetus Peak), Satellite Snowfield, Alexander Island, Antarctica

== Biology ==
- Japetus (planthopper), a genus of South American planthopper, an insect found in northern South America
- Ctenotus iapetus (C. iapetus), a species of Australian skink, a lizard found in Western Australia
- Tagiades japetus (T. japetus), a species of spread-winged skipper butterfly, found in South Asia, Australasia, northern Australia

== Other uses ==
- Japetus Steenstrup (1813–1897; Johannes Iapetus Smith Streenstrup), Danish biologist
