= Mimas Peak =

Peak on Alexander Island, Antarctica

Mimas Peak (71°56′S 69°36′W) is a sharp conspicuous peak, rising to about 1,000 metres (3,300 ft) west of the head of Saturn Glacier and 9 nautical miles (17 km) west of the Dione Nunataks in the southeast part of Alexander Island, Antarctica. It was first seen and photographed from the air by Lincoln Ellsworth on November 23, 1935, and mapped from these photos by W.L.G. Joerg. The peak was sighted from a distance in 1949 by the Falkland Islands Dependencies Survey (FIDS) and roughly positioned. It was named by the UK Antarctic Place-Names Committee for its association with nearby Saturn Glacier, Mimas being one of the satellites of the planet Saturn. The peak and surrounding area were first mapped in detail from air photos taken by the Ronne Antarctic Research Expedition 1947–48, by D. Searle of the FIDS in 1960. Note that some maps incorrectly attach the name to a subsidiary and smaller peak off the east flank of the mountain. The name is actually attached to the highest peak in the Herschel Heights range.

Mimas Peak was climbed by Paul Doubleday (British Antarctic Survey geologist) and Brian Hull (field guide) on 3 January 1993, as part of geological research in the area. In December 2012, Hamish Pritchard of the British Antarctic Survey ascended the peak.
