= Scarlatti =

Scarlatti is an Italian surname. Notable people with this surname include:

- Scarlatti family of 17th- and 18th-century Italy, which includes:
  - Alessandro Scarlatti (1660–1725), Baroque composer known for operas and chamber cantatas, father of Domenico Scarlatti
  - Francesco Scarlatti (1666–1741), Baroque composer and musician, brother of Alessandro Scarlatti
  - Domenico Scarlatti (1685–1757), Baroque composer, influential in the development of keyboard music, son of Alessandro Scarlatti
  - Giuseppe Scarlatti (1718/1723–1777), Baroque composer, nephew of Alessandro or Domenico
  - Pietro Filippo Scarlatti (1679–1750), Baroque composer, organist and choirmaster, son of Alessandro Scarlatti
  - Rosa Scarlatti (1727–1775), Italian opera singer, niece of Alessandro or Domenico
- Giorgio Scarlatti (1921–1990), Italian Formula One driver

== See also ==
- The Scarlatti Inheritance, novel by Robert Ludlum
- 6480 Scarlatti, asteroid
- Scarlatti (crater), impact crater on Mercury
- Scarlatti Peak, in Alexander Island, Antarctica
