= Europia (disambiguation) =

Europia may refer to:

- Europium(III) oxide a chemical
- Europia an epic poem by Eumelus of Corinth

== See also ==
- Europa (disambiguation)
