= Deimos Ridge =

Geographic feature in Antarctica

Coordinates: 71°56′S 68°36′W

Deimos Ridge is a prominent, narrow rocky spur of sandstone and shales, 3 nautical miles (6 km) southwest of Phobos Ridge and Mars Glacier in the southeast corner of Alexander Island, Antarctica. It was first seen from the air by Lincoln Ellsworth on November 23, 1935, and mapped from photos obtained on that flight by W.L.G. Joerg. It was first surveyed in 1949 by the Falkland Islands Dependencies Survey and named by the UK Antarctic Place-Names Committee for its association with Mars Glacier, Deimos being the outer of two satellites of the planet Mars.

== See also ==
- Leda Ridge
- Natal Ridge
- Zebra Ridge
