= Enceladus Nunataks =

Nunataks in southern Alexander island, Antarctica

The Enceladus Nunataks (71°43′S 69°27′W) are a group of about eight nunataks scattered over a wide area at the head of the drainage basin of Saturn Glacier, in southern Alexander Island, Antarctica. They were mapped from trimetrogon air photography taken by the Ronne Antarctic Research Expedition, 1947–48, and from survey by the Falkland Islands Dependencies Survey, 1948–50. The group was named by the UK Antarctic Place-Names Committee from association with Saturn Glacier, Enceladus being one of the moons of the planet Saturn.

== See also ==
- Franck Nunataks
- Iapetus Nunatak
- Selene Nunatak
