= Horsa Nunataks =

The Horsa Nunataks (68°56′S 70°18′W) are an isolated group of about five partly snow-covered nunataks, more than 610 metres (2,000 ft) high, which rise above Roberts Ice Piedmont, 14 nautical miles (26 km) north of Mount Calais, in the northeastern part of Alexander Island, Antarctica. They were first photographed from the air in 1936 by the British Graham Land Expedition under John Rymill, and were surveyed from the ground in 1948 by the Falkland Islands Dependencies Survey. The names for these nunataks and for the isolated Hengist Nunatak to the south are for the brother chieftains, Hengist and Horsa, who were believed to have led the first Saxon bands which settled England in the fifth century.

== See also ==
- Ceres Nunataks
- Quaver Nunatak
- Titan Nunatak
