= Ablation Point – Ganymede Heights Antarctic Specially Protected Area =

Protected area in Antarctica

Coordinates: 70°48′S 68°30′W

Location map of Alexander Island

Satellite image of Alexander Island

The Ablation Point – Ganymede Heights Antarctic Specially Protected Area is a 180 km^{2} mountainous tract of land on the eastern side of Alexander Island in the Bellinghausen Sea, west of Palmer Land on the Antarctic Peninsula. It has been designated Antarctic Specially Protected Area (ASPA) No.147 for its geological, geomorphological, glaciological, limnological, and ecological values, and to protect its terrestrial and freshwater ecosystems from uncontrolled human visitation and activity.

== Description ==
The ASPA is some 18 km long from north to south, and 10 km wide east to west. It is flanked in the west by the upper Jupiter Glacier, in the east by the George VI Sound permanent ice shelf, in the north by Grotto Glacier and in the south by the lower Jupiter Glacier. It contains the largest contiguous ice-free ablation area in the Antarctic Peninsula, with the smaller ice fields and valley glaciers within the massif comprising only about 17% of the site.

The site is geologically and geomorphologically complex, with outcrops of a varied range of rocks, mainly conglomerates, with lava blocks and agglomerate on valley floors and at the bases of cliffs. Steep-sided valleys are separated by undulating flat-topped ridges mainly between 650–750 m in height, rising to a maximum elevation of 1070 m. It contains raised beaches, moraine systems and patterned ground.

Many permanently frozen freshwater lakes and ice-free ponds support a diverse flora and fauna. The terrestrial vegetation is sparse, with moss and liverwort-dominated communities restricted to oases fed by water issuing from barren hillsides. Freshwater habitats support aquatic bryophytes.

== See also ==
Features within ASPA 147 include:

- Ablation Lake
- Ablation Point
- Ablation Valley
- Erratic Valley
- Flatiron Valley
- Ganymede Heights
- Himalia Ridge
- Moutonnee Lake
- Moutonnee Valley
- Striation Valley
