= Ethelbald Bluff =

Ethelbald Bluff (70°50′S 69°3′W) is a bluff composed of igneous rock forming the western end of the complex ridges trending west from Belemnite Point, Antarctica. It was named for Ethelbald, son of Ethelwulf, King of the West Saxons and effectively King of England from 858 to 860. This continues the naming of features in the area after Saxon Kings of England.
