= Add Fuel =

Portuguese visual artist and illustrator

- Born: Diogo Machado; May 1980 (age 45); Cascais, Portugal
- Education: IADE
- Known for: Graffiti; Street art Illustration; Pop surrealism

Add Fuel, real name Diogo Machado (born May 1980), is a Portuguese visual artist and illustrator. He lives and works at Cascais, Portugal.

== Artistic style ==
Diogo Machado's artwork combines fictional characters, decorative elements, and humor. His mural work using tiles and stencils is inspired by trompe-l'œil, and often emphasizes symmetry.

== Career ==
=== Illustration ===
Add Fuel has cited an older cousin who introduced him to a wide range of popular and classical artforms.

=== Street art, ceramic panels and murals ===
Add Fuel has used Azulejo mosaic tiles as a medium for graffiti and other works, and has also described is as a cultural influence.

Machado traces his initial interest in reviving Azulejo to the Cascais ArtSpace festival in Cascais in 2008. "At the time, I received the invitation to cover an entire building with a giant printed canvas and my idea was to develop an illustration piece that would represent me as an inhabitant of my city, being the festival in Cascais." he says. "I investigated several Portuguese traditional techniques and elements, such as the Galo de Barcelos and the Arraiolos tapestries, but it was a building, so the Azulejo aesthetic was the one it felt right to work on"

After this first experience, Machado studied Azulejo and ceramics and began applying it to other urban art settings, often in incongruous and non-traditional contexts. Noteworthy pieces include a 30 meters long ceramic mural, made for the Walk & Talk Public Art Festival on Ponta Delgada in the Azores islands.

Explaining why he chose the name Add Fuel, Machado has said "it's an abbreviation of the expression 'add fuel to the fire' which I like and used as my name for some time. The fact that it's in English is just because it's easier to work in an international market. Diogo Machado is hard to pronounce and to work just in the Portuguese market, unfortunately is not possible."

=== Commissioned projects ===
A Better Tomorrow, Alfa Romeo, Avalon7, Beatbombers, Burton Snowboards, Cropp, Colourlovers, Computer Arts, Dj Ride, Don't Panic, Digit, Europa Magazine, Feed The Beast FUEL TV, GAU Lisbon, MTV, MySpace, Nike, Inc., Popular Mechanics, Pyknic Clothing, Pocket Frenz, Red Bull, Toy2R, TMN (Meo (mobile phone company)), Wired (magazine), X-Funs, Yes No Maybe.

== Media ==
Coimbra 2013

Walk&Talk Azores 2012
