= Knott Nunatak =

Nunatak on Alexander Island, Antarctica

Knott Nunatak (70°40′S 69°27′W) is a nunatak 1 nautical mile (2 km) northwest of the northern extremity of the LeMay Range, in the west-central portion of Alexander Island, Antarctica. It was photographed from the air by the Ronne Antarctic Research Expedition, 1947–48, and mapped from these photographs by D. Searle of the Falkland Islands Dependencies Survey, 1960. The nunatak was named by the UK Antarctic Place-Names Committee in 1977 for Christopher E. Knott, British Antarctic Survey general assistant at Stonington Island, 1974–75, and Adelaide Island, 1975–76, who participated in a plane table survey of this area.

== See also ==
- Adams Nunatak
- Hyperion Nunataks
- Stephenson Nunatak
