= Pluto Glacier =

Glacier in Antarctica

Pluto Glacier (71°7′S 68°22′W) is a glacier on the east coast of Alexander Island, Antarctica, 10 nautical miles (18 km) long and 4 nautical miles (7 km) wide, which flows east into George VI Sound to the north of Succession Cliffs. Although Pluto Glacier is not located within nearby Planet Heights, the glacier was named in association with the mountain range along with many other nearby glaciers that are named after planets of the Solar System. The glacier was first photographed from the air on November 23, 1935, by Lincoln Ellsworth and mapped from these photos by W.L.G. Joerg. Roughly surveyed in 1936 by the British Graham Land Expedition (BGLE). Named by the United Kingdom Antarctic Place-Names Committee (UK-APC) for Pluto, then considered the ninth (and last) planet of the Solar System, following Falkland Islands Dependencies Survey (FIDS) surveys in 1948 and 1949.

== See also ==
- Jupiter Glacier
- Uranus Glacier
- Neptune Glacier
