= Recluse Nunatak =

Nunatak on Alexander Island, Antarctica

Recluse Nunatak (70°18′S 70°32′W) is an isolated rock exposure lying on the Handel Ice Piedmont, midway between Haydn Inlet and the Colbert Mountains in the west-central portion (facing towards the Wilkins Ice Shelf) of Alexander Island, Antarctica. The nunatak was first mapped from air photos taken by the Ronne Antarctic Research Expedition (RARE), 1947–48, by Searle of the Falkland Islands Dependencies Survey (FIDS) in 1960. The name given by the United Kingdom Antarctic Place-Names Committee (UK-APC) suggests the isolated position of the nunatak, considering this landform is situated far away from other landforms of Alexander Island.

== See also ==
- Ceres Nunataks
- Faulkner Nunatak
- Hengist Nunatak
