= Moutonnée Valley =

Valley in Antarctica

Coordinates: 70°51′S 68°25′W

Moutonnée Valley is a valley in the Ganymede Heights area on the east coast of Alexander Island, Antarctica. The valley runs eastward towards Moutonnée Lake and George VI Sound. It was named in association with the lake by the United Kingdom Antarctic Place-Names Committee in 1980. The site lies within Antarctic Specially Protected Area (ASPA) No.147.

== See also ==
- Ablation Valley
- Erratic Valley
- Viking Valley
