= Gannon Nunataks =

The Gannon Nunataks (70°43′S 69°28′W) are a notable twin-peaked group of nunataks (about 750 metres (2,460 ft) high) and several smaller rock outcrops, located between the northern end of the LeMay Range and the Lully Foothills, situated in the west-central portion of Alexander Island (between Haydn Inlet and Schubert Inlet), Antarctica. The feature was photographed from the air by the Ronne Antarctic Research Expedition, 1947–48, and mapped from these photographs by D. Searle of the Falkland Islands Dependencies Survey, 1960. It was named in 1977 by the UK Antarctic Place-Names Committee for Anthony E. Gannon, a British Antarctic Survey meteorological observer at Halley Station, 1970–72, a general assistant at Grytviken, 1972, and a builder at Stonington Island, 1973–75, who participated in a plane-table survey of northern Alexander Island, 1973.

== See also ==
- Franck Nunataks
- Pickering Nunataks
- Vesta Nunataks
