= Horsa (disambiguation) =

Horsa is an Anglo-Saxon leader in British legend.

Horsa may also refer to:

- HORSA, a UK government hut-building programme to support expansion under the Education Act 1944
- Airspeed Horsa, a British World War II troop-carrying glider
- G-AAUC Horsa, a biplane airliner built in 1931 by Handley Page
- Horsa Bridge, a bridge over the Orne River captured by gliderborne troops in the opening minutes the 1944 Normandy Landings
- Horsa Nunataks, a line of Antarctic islands
