= Stellar Crests =

Stellar Crests (71°5′S 69°15′W) is a four prominent snow-covered peaks, rising to about 2,000 m, surmounting LeMay Range west of the north part of Planet Heights in central Alexander Island, Antarctica. The peaks were first mapped from air photos taken by the Ronne Antarctic Research Expedition in 1947–48, by Searle of the Falkland Islands Dependencies Survey in 1960. Named by the United Kingdom Antarctic Place-Names Committee for their proximity to features named for planets and their satellites.
