= Callisto Cliffs =

Cliffs in Antarctica

Callisto Cliffs (71°3′S 68°20′W), rising to 550 metres (1,800 ft), are two cliffs, one forming the southern margins of Jupiter Glacier, the other the eastern margin of Alexander Island, Antarctica. The feature was mapped from trimetrogon air photography taken by the Ronne Antarctic Research Expedition, 1947–48, and from survey by the Falkland Islands Dependencies Survey, 1948–50, and was named by the UK Antarctic Place-names Committee in association with Jupiter Glacier after Callisto, one of the moons of the planet Jupiter.

== See also ==
- Burn Cliffs
- Cannonball Cliffs
- Corner Cliffs
