= Mariner Hill =

Hill in Antarctica

Mariner Hill (71°51′S 68°20′W) is a prominent snow-free conical hill, rising to about 500 metres (1,600 ft) midway between Syrtis Hill and Two Step Cliffs, situated in the southeastern portion of Alexander Island, Antarctica. It was named by the UK Antarctic Place-Names Committee in 1993 after Mariner 9, the NASA probe which was the first spacecraft to orbit the planet Mars, in 1971.
