= MS Europa 2 =

Cruise ship (2013-present)

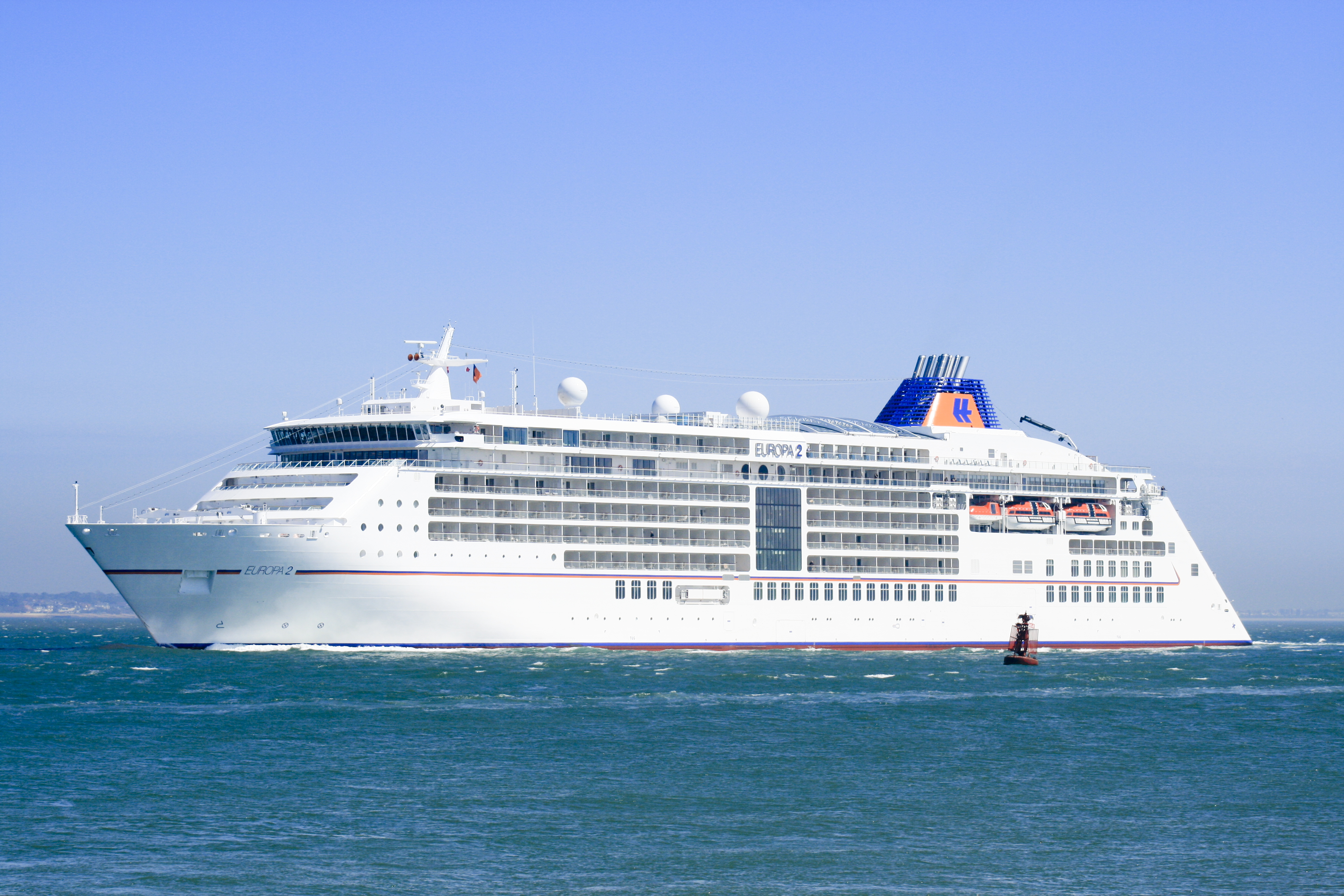
- Europa 2 entering Southampton Water

History
- Name: Europa 2
- Operator: Hapag-Lloyd cruises
- Port of registry: Valletta, Malta
- Builder: STX Europe, Saint-Nazaire, France
- Laid down: 7 February 2012
- Launched: 6 July 2012
- Christened: 10 May 2013
- Acquired: 26 April 2013
- Maiden voyage: 11 May 2013
- Identification: Call sign: 9HA3283; IMO number: 9616230; MMSI number: 229378000
- Status: In service

General characteristics
- Tonnage: 42,830 GT
- Length: 225.62 m (740 ft)
- Beam: 26.70 m (88 ft)
- Draught: 6.3 m (21 ft)
- Decks: 7 passenger decks
- Propulsion: Diesel-electric with four MaK 6M43C, 24 MW total
- Speed: 21 knots
- Capacity: 516 passengers
- Crew: More than 370

MS Europa 2 is a cruise ship operated by Hapag-Lloyd Cruises, a German-based cruise line. She entered service in May 2013.

== Concept and construction ==
Europa 2 was built at the STX Europe shipyard at St-Nazaire, France. Her first steel was cut on 5 September 2011, the keel was laid on 1 March 2012 and she was launched on 6 July 2012. On 29 April 2013, the vessel was handed over to Hapag Lloyd, with Wolfgang Flägel, managing director of Hapag-Lloyd Cruises and Laurent Castaing, general manager of STX France, signing the takeover protocol. She was christened on 10 May 2013, during the 824th Hamburg Port anniversary.

== Public areas ==
Europa 2 is intended to convey a more relaxing atmosphere than that of her more traditional fleet mate, the Europa. She has the greatest space per passenger of any cruise ship, with contemporary decor.

The art collection aboard Europa 2 is one of the largest at sea, with 890 originals commissioned exclusively for the vessel. The collection's focus is on contemporary pieces; it includes works by Ólafur Elíasson, David Hockney, Damien Hirst, Adam Fuss and Hans Hartung.

== Facilities ==
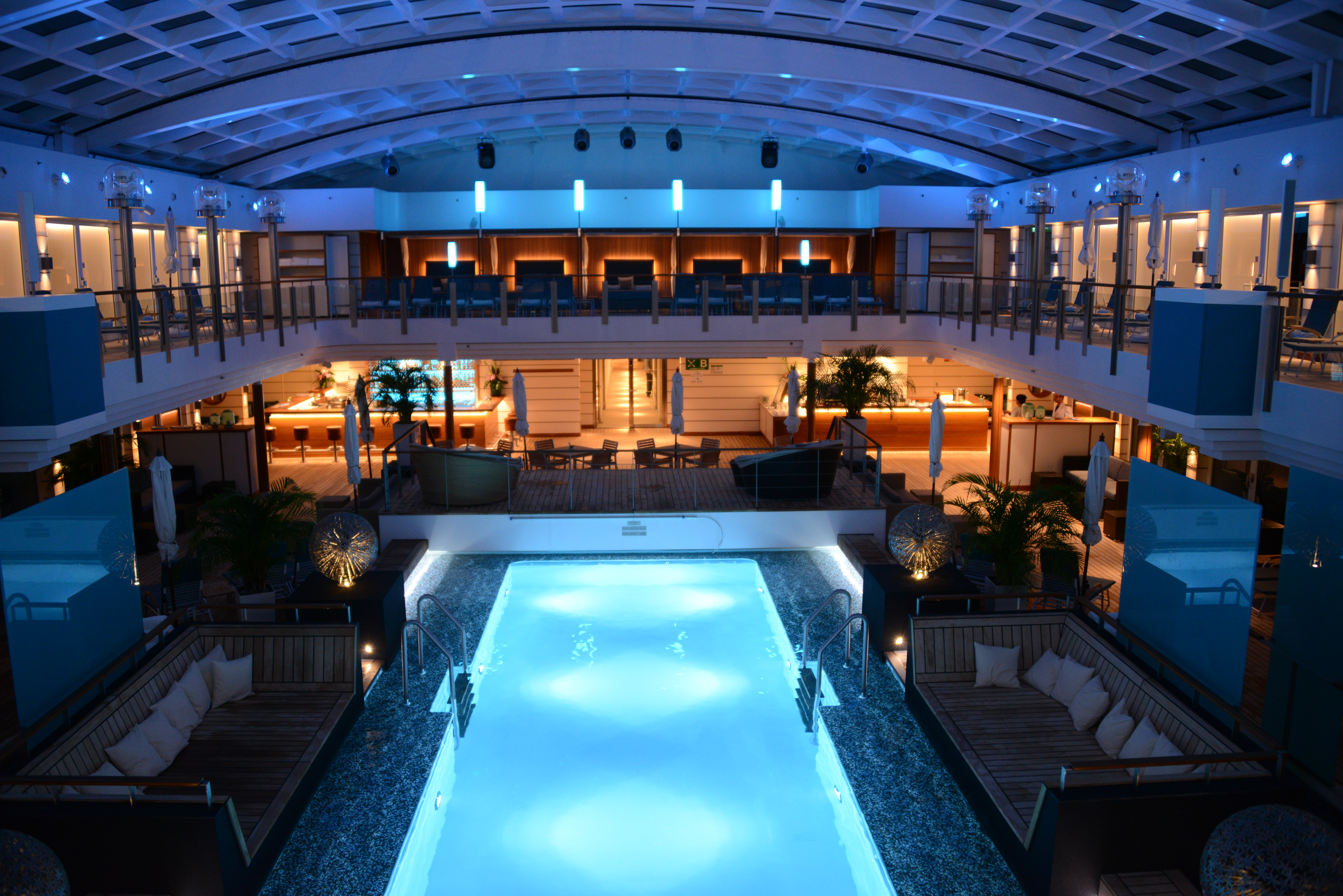
Europa 2's pool deck

Europa 2 has 251 passenger cabins, seven restaurants and six bars, a 15-metre-long (49 ft) pool, a gym, a spa and two golf simulators.

The option to plugin whilst in port (and turnoff the engines) was added in 2020 (known as cold ironing)

== Service history ==
Europa 2's 14-night maiden voyage departed from Hamburg, Germany, and stopped at Amsterdam, Antwerp, Honfleur, La Rochelle, Bordeaux, Bilbao, Leixões and Lisbon. The vessel has since been named the number-one cruise ship in the world by the Berlitz Guide to Cruising & Cruise Ships, replacing her fleetmate, MS Europa, which had held that distinction for more than a decade.

== See also ==
- List of cruise ships
