= Aleksandar Teodorov-Balan =

Bulgarian linguist and historian

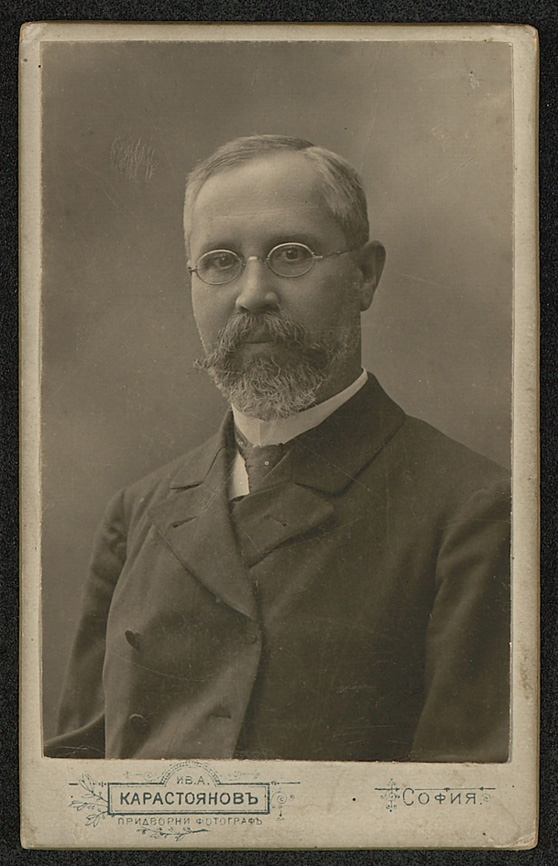
Aleksandar Teodorov-Balan, 1910

Aleksandar Stoyanov Teodorov-Balan (Bulgarian: Александър Стоянов Теодоров-Балан; 27 October 1859 – 12 February 1959) was a Bulgarian linguist, historian and bibliographer.

Balan was born in the Bessarabian village of Kubei, today in Bolhrad Raion, Odesa Oblast, Russian Empire, to a Bessarabian Bulgarian family. His brothers are the Bulgarian general Georgi Todorov, the lawyer and mayor of Sofia Martin Todorov, Prof. Atanas Teodorov and Eng. Mihail Balanski.

Balan studied in Prague and Leipzig graduating in Slavistics from the Charles University in Prague with a doctorate (1884). Returning to Bulgaria, Balan became a high school teacher in Plovdiv. In 1885–1886, he was deputy director of the National Library in Sofia, the capital of the Principality of Bulgaria. In 1887–1888, he worked in the Ministry of Education, becoming head of secondary education.

He became professor of Slavic ethnography and dialectology and history of the Bulgarian language, since 1893 head of the Bulgarian and Slavic literature department of the High Pedagogical School (the future Sofia University). On 29 January 1889, he was elected the first rector of the university and reelected several times (1896–1897, 1902–1903); he was also dean of the Faculty of History and Philosophy (1899–1900, 1904–1905). In the late 19th and early 20th century, he was secretary of the Bulgarian Academy of Sciences, and from 1939 on he was doctor honoris causa of the Sofia University, as well as an active member of the Bulgarian Academy of Sciences.

In 1907, when after the students booed Prince Ferdinand, the university was closed and the teaching staff dismissed, Aleksandar Balan became the head secretary of the Bulgarian Exarchate in Constantinople. He remained in this position until mid-1910, when he resumed his teaching position at the university. Aleksandar Teodorov-Balan was also among the founders of the tourist movement in Bulgaria, a long-standing chairman of the Bulgarian Tourist Association and editor of the Bulgarian Tourist magazine. In addition, he was also Grand Master of the Grand Masonic Lodge of Bulgaria.

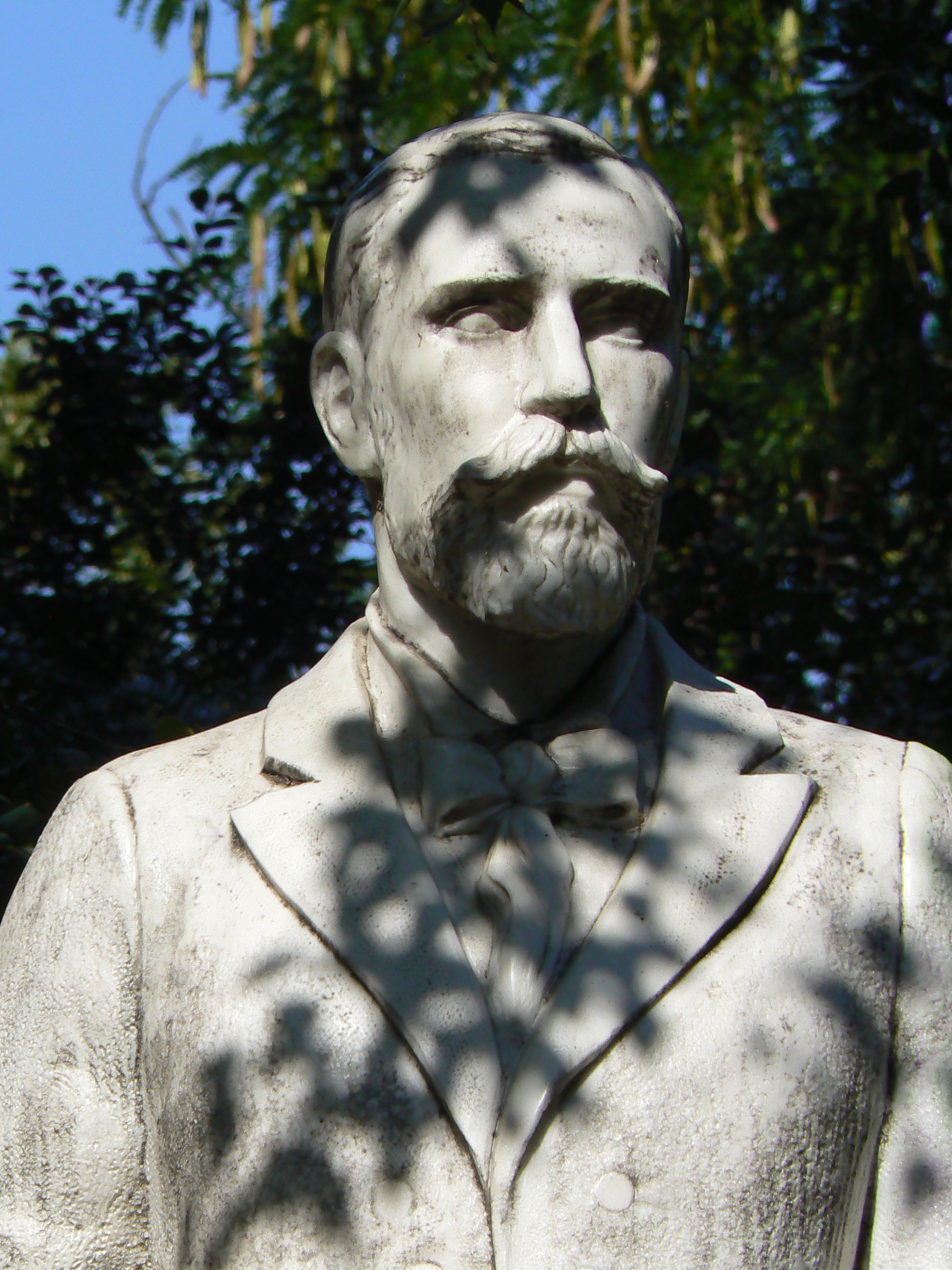
Monument to Balan

== Works ==
Alexander Balan's scientific achievements are in the fields of linguistics, literary studies, and bibliography.

The areas of linguistic science on which Academician Balan works are: the essence, history and philosophy of the Bulgarian language, grammar of the Bulgarian language, spelling reforms, lexicology, language teaching and language culture. Among his most important scientific contributions ranks his work on the peculiarities of Bulgarian phonology, his struggle against loanwords (linguistic purism), the enrichment of the language.

He also published works in the field of literary history. Some of his publications (including posthumous) include:

- A study on Slavonic-Bulgarian History, Plovdiv, 1898
- Sophronius of Vratsa, Sofia, 1906
- Cyril and Methodius. Passionals, Sofia, 1920
- New Bulgarian grammar, Sofia, 1940
- Struggle for modern orthography (1921-1923), Sofia, 1924
- New Bulgarian grammar for everyone, Sofia, 1958
- Selected works, Sofia, 1987
- A book about myself, Sofia, 1988

Balan's scientific legacy amounts to 886 titles, including books, studies, articles and notes, of which 310 devoted to the Bulgarian language, as well as many successful neologisms. Despite his numerous contributions, Balan lived in relative poverty, with his French wife often suffering from tuberculosis. Balan survived to almost centenarian age, he died in Sofia on 12 February 1959.

== Memory ==
Balan Ridge on Alexander Island in Antarctica is named after Aleksandar Balan, as is the Sofia Metro's Akademik Aleksandar Teodorov - Balan Metro Station in the Mladost district.
