= Georgian Cliff =

Georgian Cliff (71°15′S 68°15′W) is a prominent cliff along George VI Sound, located just north of the terminus of Eros Glacier on the east side of Alexander Island, Antarctica. The feature forms a bluff 550 metres (1,800 ft) high at its northern end, but becomes a sharp ridge toward the south. It was mapped from trimetrogon air photography taken by the Ronne Antarctic Research Expedition, 1947–48, and from survey by the Falkland Islands Dependencies Survey, 1948–50, and was so named by the UK Antarctic Place-Names Committee because it lies on George VI Sound.
