= Mount Liszt =

Mountain on Alexander Island, Antarctica

- Location within Antarctica

Highest point
- Elevation: 600 metres (2,000 ft)
- Coordinates: 71°29′S 72°0′W

Geography
- Location: Beethoven Peninsula, Alexander Island, Antarctica

Mount Liszt is a snow-covered mountain, about 600 metres (2,000 ft) high, with a scarp on its southeastern face, rising 5 nautical miles (9 km) northeast of Mount Grieg, on the Beethoven Peninsula, situated in the southwest portion of Alexander Island, Antarctica. A number of mountains in this vicinity first appear on maps by the Ronne Antarctic Research Expedition (RARE), 1947–48. This mountain, apparently one of these, was mapped from RARE air photos by D. Searle of the Falkland Islands Dependencies Survey in 1960, and was named by the UK Antarctic Place-Names Committee after Franz Liszt, the Hungarian composer.

== See also ==
- Mount McArthur
- Mount Morley
- Mount Schumann
- Dint Island
- Gannon Nunataks
