= Moutonnée Lake =

Body of water on Alexander Island, Antarctica

- Location within Antarctica
- Location: Moutonnee Valley, Antarctica
- Coordinates: 70°52′S 68°20′W
- Type: sub-glacial lake

Moutonnée Lake is a sub-glacial lake that lies within Moutonnee Valley, marginal to the George VI Ice Shelf, 7 km (4.3 mi) south of Ablation Point indenting the east coast of Alexander Island, facing the west coast of Palmer Land, Antarctica. Following limnological and tidal studies by the British Antarctic Survey (BAS) from 1971, it was named by the United Kingdom Antarctic Place-Names Committee (UK-APC) from the presence of roche moutonnées on its shores. As with nearby Ablation and Hodgson Lakes, Moutonnée receives large masses of ice from the adjacent George VI Ice Shelf in George VI Sound, making life in the lake unsustainable. The site lies within Antarctic Specially Protected Area (ASPA) No.147.
