= Neptune Glacier =

Glacier in Antarctica

Neptune Glacier (71°44′S 68°17′W) is a glacier on the east coast of Alexander Island, Antarctica, 12 nautical miles (22 km) long and 4 nautical miles (7 km) wide, flowing east into George VI Sound and the George VI Ice Shelf to the south of Triton Point. Although Neptune Glacier is not located within the mountain range Planet Heights, the glaciers name derives from the mountain range along with many other nearby glaciers named after planets of the Solar System. There are also other nearby landforms named in association with these glaciers. The glacier was first sighted from the air by Lincoln Ellsworth on November 23, 1935, and roughly mapped from photos obtained on that flight by W.L.G. Joerg. The mouth of the glacier was positioned in 1936 by the British Graham Land Expedition (BGLE). Named by the United Kingdom Antarctic Place-Names Committee (UK-APC) for the planet Neptune following a Falkland Islands Dependencies Survey (FIDS) survey in 1949. The head of the glacier was mapped from air photos taken by the Ronne Antarctic Research Expedition (RARE), 1947–48, by Searle of the FIDS in 1960.

== See also ==
- Mars Glacier
- Mercury Glacier
- Saturn Glacier
