= MS Europa =

A number of motor ships have been named MS Europa after the mythical Europa and the continent of Europe:

- MS Europa (1931), a cargo ship destroyed at Liverpool in 1941 during an air raid
- MS Europa (1952), an ocean liner operated by Lloyd Tiestino (1952–1976)
- MS Europa (1953), a combined ocean liner / cruise ship operated by the North German Lloyd (1965–1970) and Hapag-Lloyd (1970–1981)
- MS Europa (1981), a cruise ship operated by Hapag-Lloyd (1981–1999)
- MS Europa (1999), a cruise ship operated by Hapag-Lloyd (1999–present)
- MS Europa 2 (2013), a cruise ship operated by Hapag-Lloyd (2013–present)

Additionally:

- MS Silja Europa, a cruiseferry operated by Silja Line (1993–present)
- Costa Europa, a cruise ship operated by Costa Cruises (2002–2010)

== See also ==
- SS Europa, the name of several steamships
- Europa (1781 EIC ship), a British East Indiaman
- Europa (barque), a Dutch tall ship built in 1911
