= Hotel Europe =

Hotel Europe may refer to:

== Hotels ==
- Hotel Europe (Sarajevo), a hotel in Sarajevo, Bosnia and Herzegovina
- Hotel Europe (Vancouver), a hotel in Vancouver, Canada
- Hotel de l'Europe (Amsterdam), a hotel in Amsterdam, Netherlands
- Hotel Europejski, a hotel in Warsaw, Poland
- Grand Hotel Europe, a hotel in Saint Petersburg, Russia
- Hotel de l'Europe, demolished in 1900 to build the Old Supreme Court Building, Singapore

== Other uses ==
- Hotel Europe, a 1999 sculpture by HA Schult
- Grand Hotel Europa, a 2018 novel by Ilja Leonard Pfeijffer

== See also ==
- Hôtel de l'Europe et des Princes, a hôtel particulier in Paris
- Europa Hotel (disambiguation), or Hotel Europa
