= Caninus Nunatak =

Nunatak on Alexander Island, Antarctica

Caninus Nunatak (71°6′S 70°10′W) is a nunatak, about 700 metres (2,300 ft) high, located east of Palindrome Buttress and the northern part of the Walton Mountains, Alexander Island. In the 1974–75 field season, the British Antarctic Survey reduced its number of dog teams. The name derives from the burial of nine dogs near the nunatak, "caninus" being a Latin word (from "canis") meaning relating to dogs. Caninus Nunatak seems to have some relation with nearby nunataks named after certain sled dog teams, some of these include Admirals Nunatak and Huns Nunatak.
