= Succession Cliffs =

Cliffs on Alexander Island, Antarctica

Succession Cliffs (71°11′S 68°16′W) is a line of steep cliffs 1.5 nautical miles (2.8 km) extending along the east coast of Alexander Island, Antarctica, facing east towards George VI Sound immediately south of the mouth of Pluto Glacier. The cliffs were probably first sighted by Lincoln Ellsworth who photographed segments of the coast in this vicinity on November 23, 1935. First roughly surveyed from the ground in 1936 by the British Graham Land Expedition and resurveyed in 1948 by the Falkland Islands Dependencies Survey. So named by the FIDS because a geologic succession, or depositional sequence, is revealed by the accessible rock exposures of the cliffs.

== See also ==
- Callisto Cliffs
- Cannonball Cliffs
- Corner Cliffs
