= Evropa =

Evropa may refer to:

- Europe, as spelled in certain Slavic languages
- Evropa (album), a 2001 album by Serbian singer Stoja
- Evropa (magazine), a Serbian weekly magazine
- Evropa 2, a commercial radio station in the Czech Republic
- Identity Evropa, an American white nationalist organization

== See also ==
- Europa (disambiguation)
