= Scarlatti Peak =

Peak on Alexander Island, Antarctica

Scarlatti Peak (71°16′S 70°26′W) is a conspicuous pyramidal peak, rising to 750 m, 8 nautical miles (15 km) northwest of Holst Peak and 12 nautical miles (22 km) east of Walton Mountains in the central part of Alexander Island, Antarctica. The peak was first mapped from air photos obtained by the Ronne Antarctic Research Expedition in 1947–48, by Searle of the Falkland Islands Dependencies Survey in 1960. Named by the United Kingdom Antarctic Place-Names Committee for Alessandro Scarlatti (1660–1725), Italian composer.

== See also ==
- Beagle Peak
- Krieger Peak
- Simon Peak
