= Ravel Peak =

Peak in Antarctica

Ravel Peak (69°55′S 71°17′W) is an isolated peak, rising to about 1,300 m, surmounting Debussy Heights situated in the northern portion of Alexander Island, Antarctica. The peak is markedly pyramid shaped when viewed from the east side. First mapped from air photos taken by the Ronne Antarctic Research Expedition (RARE), 1947–48, by Searle of the Falkland Islands Dependencies Survey (FIDS) in 1960. Named by the United Kingdom Antarctic Place-Names Committee (UK-APC) after Maurice Ravel (1875–1937), French composer and in association with the nearby landforms named after composers in this area.

== See also ==
- Copland Peak
- Lamina Peak
- Richter Peaks
