= SS Europa =

A number of steamships have been named SS Europa after the continent of Europe:

- SS Europa (1922), a 16,504-ton ocean liner in Europe—North America immigrant service in 1950–51 (formerly SS Mongolia (1922))
- SS Europa (1928), an ocean liner operated by the North German Lloyd 1930–1945
- SS Europa (1847) Cunard line America-class paddle steamer

== See also ==
- MS Europa for other ships with this name
- Europa (disambiguation) for other things named Europa
