= Sutton Heights =

Topographic feature on Alexander Island, Antarctica

Sutton Heights (69°45′S 71°30′W) is an eminence rising to about 800 m lying between the Lassus Mountains and Debussy Heights, in the northern portion of Alexander Island, Antarctica. The area was photographed from the air by Ronne Antarctic Research Expedition in 1947, mapped from air photographs by Falkland Islands Dependencies Survey in 1959, and surveyed by the British Antarctic Survey in 1975–76. They are named after John Sutton, Professor of Geology, at Imperial College of Science and Technology, London, who studied the area from 1958 to 1973.

== See also ==
- Debussy Heights
- Ganymede Heights
- Planet Heights
