= Krieger Peak =

Peak on Alexander Island, Antarctica

Krieger Peak (71°46′S 70°35′W) is a peak between Duffy Peak and The Obelisk in the central part of the Staccato Peaks, southern Alexander Island, Antarctica. The peak was photographed from the air by Lincoln Ellsworth in 1935, and was named by the Advisory Committee on Antarctic Names for Lieutenant Commander Charles J. Krieger, U.S. Navy, an aircraft commander in Squadron VXE-6, Operation Deep Freeze, 1969 and 1970.

== See also ==
- Beagle Peak
- Gluck Peak
- Juno Peaks
