= Ganymede Heights =

Topographic feature on Alexander Island, Antarctica

Coordinates: 70°52′S 68°26′W

The Ganymede Heights consist of rounded ridges with extensive rock outcrops rising to about 600 m (2,000 ft), between Jupiter Glacier and Ablation Valley on the eastern side of Alexander Island, Antarctica. They were mapped by the Directorate of Overseas Surveys from satellite imagery supplied by the US National Aeronautics and Space Administration in cooperation with the US Geological Survey. They were named by the UK Antarctic Place-Names Committee from association with Jupiter Glacier after Ganymede, one of the satellites of the planet Jupiter. The feature also lies close to the Galileo Cliffs, which were named for the moon's discoverer, Galileo Galilei (1564-1642). The site lies within Antarctic Specially Protected Area (ASPA) No.147.

== See also ==
- Debussy Heights
- Herschel Heights
- Sutton Heights
