= Europa (video game) =

2024 video game

- Developer: Novadust Entertainment
- Publisher: Future Friends Games
- Director: Helder Pinto
- Programmer: Alexander Petherick-Brian
- Writers: Helder Pinto; Grace Curtis
- Composer: Matthew Thomason
- Platforms: Nintendo Switch; Windows
- Release: October 11, 2024
- Genre: Action-adventure
- Mode: Single-player

Europa is an action-adventure indie game developed by Novadust Entertainment and published by Future Friends Games. The game was released for Windows and Nintendo Switch on October 11, 2024.

== Gameplay ==
Europa is a third-person action-adventure game. The game features 3D platforming mechanics and puzzle solving. It includes free-flowing movement and allows players to go higher and reach further distances on the map by upgrading a jetpack.

== Development ==
Europa has been in development since 2017. It is identified as a "passion project" for the studio by creative director Helder Pinto. Europa was announced on December 8, 2022, at the Wholesome Snack: The Game Awards Edition. The game's reveal trailer was shown during the event, which showcased the game's premise, setting, and art style. The game had a demo trailer at the Future Games Show at Gamescom 2023, where it revealed more gameplay features and locations. The game was originally planned to be released in 2023, but was delayed to 2024, due to development challenges.

== Reception ==
Reception

Aggregate scores
Aggregator	Score
Metacritic	(PC) 77/100
OpenCritic	54% recommend

Review scores
Publication	Score
Destructoid	8/10
Eurogamer	4/5
PC Gamer (US)	65/100
Shacknews	7/10

Europa received "generally favorable" reviews from critics, according to review aggregator Metacritic, and 54% of critics recommended the game, according to OpenCritic.
