= Satellite Snowfield =

Satellite Snowfield (71°28′S 69°45′W) is a snowfield at the southeast side of the Walton Mountains situated within the south-central portion of Alexander Island, Antarctica. The snowfield was first mapped by the Directorate of Overseas Surveys from satellite imagery supplied by U.S. National Aeronautics and Space Administration in cooperation with U.S. Geological Survey. The name applied by the United Kingdom Antarctic Place-Names Committee (UK-APC) is for the satellites of the planets of the Solar System, a theme used in naming several features in this area, mainly glaciers.
