= Debussy Heights =

Minor mountain range in Antarctica

Coordinates: 69°53′S 71°23′W

Debussy Heights is a minor mountain range rising to 1,300 metres (4,300 ft) (at Ravel Peak) east of Mozart Ice Piedmont in the north part of Alexander Island, Antarctica. The feature was first spotted and mapped, from air photos taken by the Ronne Antarctic Research Expedition, 1947–48, by D. Searle of the Falkland Islands Dependencies Survey in 1960, and was named by the UK Antarctic Place-Names Committee after Claude Debussy, the French composer (1862–1918).

== See also ==
- Sutton Heights
- Planet Heights
