= Roberts Ice Piedmont =

Large ice piedmont covering the northeast of Alexander Island, Antarctica

Roberts Ice Piedmont (69°0′S 70°20′W) is a large ice piedmont, 20 nautical miles (37 km) long in a north–south direction and 15 nautical miles (28 km) wide, lying to the north and northwest of Mount Calais and occupying most of the northeast corner of Alexander Island, Antarctica. It was first seen from a distance and roughly surveyed by the French Antarctic Expedition, 1908–10, under Charcot. It was photographed from the air by the British Graham Land Expedition (BGLE) on August 15, 1936, and roughly mapped from these photos. It was then named by the United Kingdom Antarctic Place-Names Committee (UK-APC) in 1955 after Brian B. Roberts (1912–78), a British ornithologist, polar specialist and leading figure in the development of Antarctic nomenclature; ornithologist, BGLE, 1934–37; Secretary, United Kingdom Antarctic Place-names Committee, 1945–74. About six nunataks are situated within the Roberts Ice Piedmont, these are Hengist Nunatak (a separate nunatak) and the Horsa Nunataks (a group of about five nunataks). Both of these features are named after Saxon kings of England in the fifth century; however, they have no association or relation with Brian B. Roberts and the Roberts Ice Piedmont itself.

== See also ==
- Handel Ice Piedmont
- Mozart Ice Piedmont
