= Franck Nunataks =

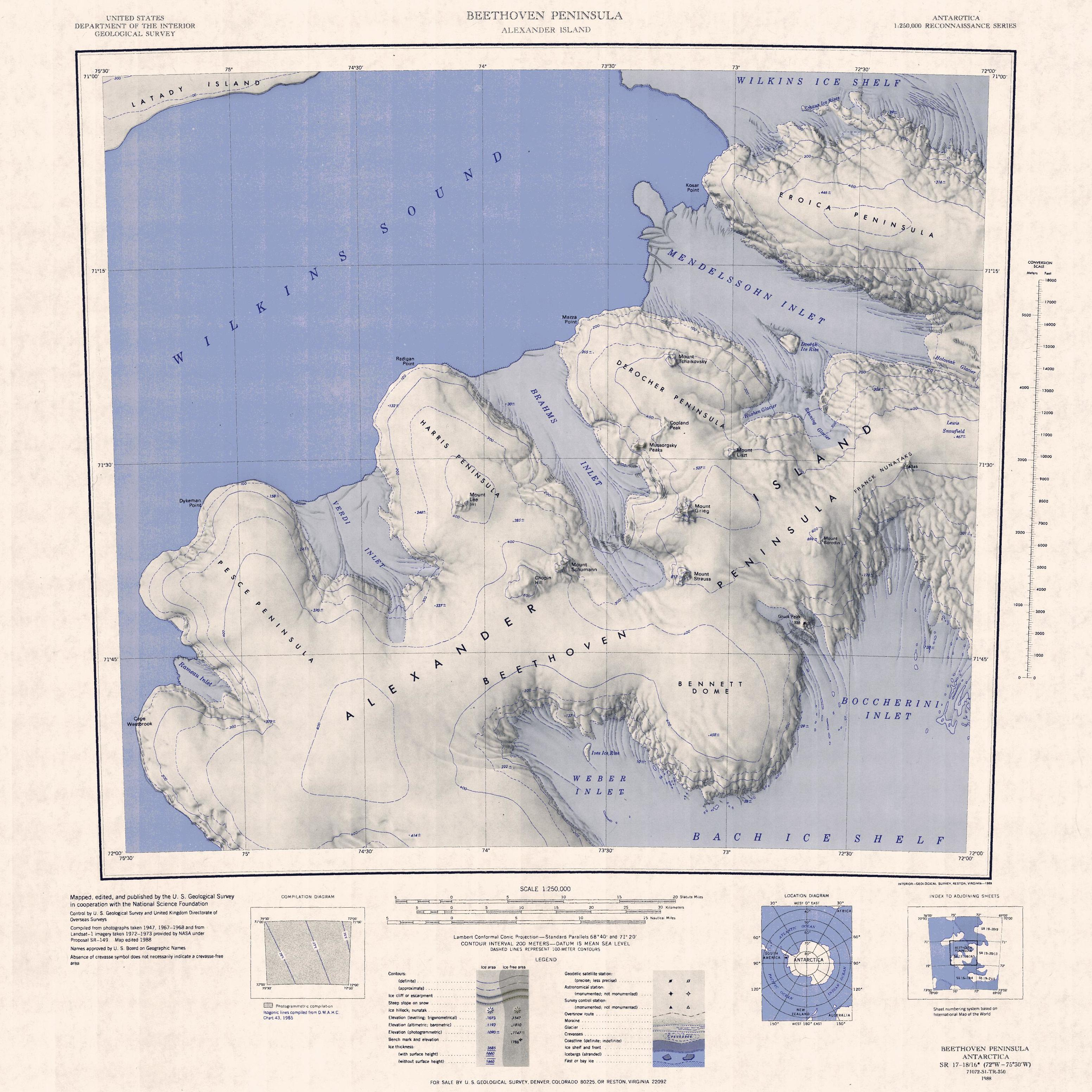
Topographic reconnaissance map of the Beethoven Peninsula area of Alexander Island from in Antarctica including Franck Nunataks

The Franck Nunataks (71°32′S 72°23′W) are a scattered group of small rock outcrops, 3 nautical miles (6 km) in extent, at the base of the Beethoven Peninsula in the southwest part of Alexander Island, Antarctica. They were first mapped from air photos taken by the Ronne Antarctic Research Expedition, 1947–48, by D. Searle of the Falkland Islands Dependencies Survey in 1960. They were named by the UK Antarctic Place-Names Committee after César Franck, the French composer, 1822–1890.

== See also ==
- Atoll Nunataks
- Hyperion Nunataks
- Pickering Nunataks
- Enceladus Nunataks
