= Mercury Glacier (Alexander Island) =

Glacier on Alexander Island, Antarctica

Mercury Glacier (71°34′S 68°14′W) is a glacier on the east coast of Alexander Island, Antarctica, 5 nautical miles (9 km) long and 2 nautical miles (4 km) wide, flowing east into George VI Sound between the Waitabit Cliffs and Keystone Cliffs. The glacier was probably first sighted from a distance by Lincoln Ellsworth, who flew near it and photographed segments of this coast on November 23, 1935. It was named by the UK Antarctic Place-Names Committee for the planet Mercury following rough surveys from George VI Sound by the Falkland Islands Dependencies Survey (FIDS) in 1948 and 1949. The glacier was mapped in detail from air photos taken by the Ronne Antarctic Research Expedition, 1947–48, by D. Searle of the FIDS in 1960. Although Mercury Glacier is not located within the Planet Heights, it is named in association with the heights along with many other nearby glaciers named after planets of the Solar System.

== See also ==
- Mars Glacier
- Saturn Glacier
- Uranus Glacier
