= Emerald Nunatak =

Highest point
- Elevation: 1,250 m (4,100 ft)
- Coordinates: 69°39′S 69°59′W

Geography
- Location: Northeast Alexander Island, Antarctica
- Parent range: Douglas Range

Geology
- Mountain type: Nunatak
- Rock type: Greenish rock

Emerald Nunatak (69°39′S 69°59′W) is a nunatak 1,250 metres (4,100 ft) high on the west side of the Douglas Range near the head of Hampton Glacier in northeast Alexander Island, Antarctica. It was so named by the UK Antarctic Place-Names Committee following surveys by the British Antarctic Survey, 1973–77, because of the greenish rock of which the feature is composed.

== See also ==
- Figaro Nunatak
- Hengist Nunatak
- Lizard Nunatak
