= Viking Valley =

Valley in Alexander Island, Antarctica

Viking Valley (71°53′S 68°21′W) is a valley lying on the east side of Mars Glacier containing a braided stream which feeds into Secret Lake, situated in the southeast corner of Alexander Island, Antarctica. This area was the prime research site of the 1992-93 Mars Glacier field party led by D. D. Wynn-Williams. The feature was named by the United Kingdom Antarctic Place-Names Committee in 1993 in association with nearby Mars Glacier. The name "Viking" stems from the Viking Lander project of NASA which first searched for life on Mars in 1976.

== See also ==
- Ablation Valley
- Flatiron Valley
- Moutonnée Valley
