= Figaro Nunatak =

Isolated nunatak on Alexander Island, Antarctica

Coordinates: 70°7′S 70°44′W

Figaro Nunatak is an isolated nunatak rising to about 200 metres (660 ft) near the east end of Mozart Ice Piedmont, in the northern part of Alexander Island, Antarctica. It was mapped from air photos taken by the Ronne Antarctic Research Expedition, 1947–48, by D. Searle of the Falkland Islands Dependencies Survey in 1960, and was named by the UK Antarctic Place-Names Committee from association with the Mozart Ice Piedmont after Mozart's opera The Marriage of Figaro, composed in 1786.

== See also ==
- Gannon Nunataks
- Hyperion Nunataks
- Stephenson Nunatak
