= Europa Hotel =

Europa Hotel or Hotel Europa may refer to:

- Hotel Evropa, a former name of the Hotel Europe (Sarajevo), Bosnia and Herzegovina
- Hotel Europe (Vancouver), Canada
- Hotel Europa, in the Edificio Gonzalo Mejía, Medellín, Colombia
- Grand Hotel Evropa in Wenceslas Square, Czech Republic
- Europa Hotel, a former name of the Danhostel Copenhagen City, Denmark
- Europa Hotel, a former name of the London Marriott Hotel Grosvenor Square, Mayfair, London, England
- Europa Hotel, Cairo, Egypt; see 1996 Cairo shooting
- Europa Hotel, Belfast, Northern Ireland
- Hotel Europa Palace, Anacapri, Capri, Naples, Italy; see architect Gianfranco Frattini
- Hotel Europa (Venice), Italy, in Ca' Giustinian
- Hotel Europa (Maracaibo), in Venezuela

== See also ==
- Hotel Evropeiskaya, Soviet-era name of the Grand Hotel Europe in Saint Petersburg, Russia
- Hotel Europe (disambiguation)
