= Burn Cliffs =

Cliffs in Antarctica

Burn Cliffs (70°6′S 69°47′W) are two rock outlier ridges, 455 metres (1,500 ft) high, westward of Mount Ethelwulf, Douglas Range, at the head of Haydn Inlet, in the west-central part of Alexander Island, Antarctica. The feature was mapped by Directorate of Overseas Surveys (DOS) from aerial photographs taken by the U.S. Navy in 1966 and from U.S. Landsat imagery taken January 1974, and named by the UK Antarctic Place-Names Committee, 1977, after Richard W. Burn, British Antarctic Survey geologist, Adelaide Island and north Alexander Island, 1975–76 and 1976–77.

== See also ==
- Cannonball Cliffs
- Corner Cliffs
