= USS Europa =

USS Europa may refer to the following ships operated by the United States:

- Europa (AK-81), sometimes incorrectly seen as USS Europa (AK-81), was delivered uncompleted to the Navy on 24 November 1943 and transferred to the Army the next day where she served as the U.S. Army Engineer Port Repair Ship Thomas F. Farrel Jr.
- USS Europa (AP-177), was taken as a war prize on 8 May 1945 and operated as a troop transport until decommissioned 2 May 1946. She was later transferred to France and served as SS Liberté
