= Two Step Moraine =

Two Step Moraine (71°53′S 68°20′W) is a small area of homogeneous fine morainic debris, in the south-facing moraines at the foot of Two Step Cliffs, situated in the southern portion of Alexander Island, Antarctica. Containing moist soil and two sub-glacial ponds, the feature is remarkable for its abundance of mosses, algae, and cyanobacteria in such a southerly location. The feature was named by United Kingdom Antarctic Place-Names Committee in 1993 in association with Two Step Cliffs.
