= Adams Nunatak =

Nunatak on Alexander Island, Antarctica

Highest point
- Coordinates: 71°44′S 68°34′W

Geography
- Location: Alexander Island, Antarctica

Adams Nunatak is a nunatak on the south side of Neptune Glacier, 6 miles (10 km) west of Cannonball Cliffs, and lies about 7.4 miles (12 km) inland from George VI Sound in eastern Alexander Island, Antarctica. Mapped by Directorate of Overseas Surveys from satellite imagery supplied by NASA in cooperation with U.S. Geological Survey. Named by United Kingdom Antarctic Place-Names Committee (UK-APC) in association with Neptune Glacier after John Couch Adams, the Cambridge mathematician who deduced the existence of the planet Neptune.
