= Aeolus Ridge =

Aeolus Ridge (71°18′S 68°34′W) is a ridge trending northeast–southwest and rising to about 1,300 metres (4,265 ft) lying in the upper Uranus Glacier at the southern end of Planet Heights in eastern Alexander Island, Antarctica. Named in 1987 by the United Kingdom Antarctic Place-Names Committee after Aeolus, the Greek god of wind, in reference to prevailing weather encountered here by British Antarctic Survey parties.
