= Europa Press (publisher) =

Publishing house based in Paris, France

The Europa Press was a publishing house founded and run by the Irish-Russian surrealist poet, literary agent, publisher, and translator George Reavey. The press was based in Paris from its inception in 1932 until 1935, when Reavey moved to London. It ceased operation in 1939.

The Europa Press is important in the history of 20th century Irish poetry because it published early work by Reavey, Brian Coffey, Denis Devlin and Samuel Beckett and in a wider context of literary and surrealist history because it published the first ever collection of English-language versions of work by Paul Éluard. This was published to coincide with the opening of the International Surrealist Exhibition in 1936 and featured a drawing by Pablo Picasso and a preface by Herbert Read, and the translators included Reavey, Beckett, Devlin, David Gascoyne, Man Ray and Ruthven Todd.

== Complete list of Europa Press books ==
1. Reavey, George. Faust's Metamorphoses. (1932) (in association with The New Review).
2. Reavey, George. Nostradam. (1935).
3. Reavey, George. Signes d'Adieu. (1935).
4. Beckett, Samuel. Echo's Bones and Other Precipitates. (1935).
5. Eluard, Paul. Thorns of Thunder. (1936).
6. Devlin, Denis. Intercessions. (1937).
7. Ford, Charles Henry. The Garden of Disorder. (1938)
8. Coffey, Brian. Third Person. (1938)
9. Reavey, George. Quixotic Perquisitions. (1939).
