= Ceres Nunataks =

Summits on Alexander Island, Antarctica

The Ceres Nunataks (72°3′S 70°25′W) are a group of three nunataks located immediately east of the base of Shostakovich Peninsula in southern Alexander Island, Antarctica. They were mapped by the Directorate of Overseas Surveys from satellite imagery supplied by the U.S. National Aeronautics and Space Administration in cooperation with the U.S. Geological Survey, and named by the UK Antarctic Place-Names Committee after Ceres, one of the asteroids lying between the orbits of the planets Mars and Jupiter.

== Geology ==
According to the British Antarctic Survey's (BAS) aeromagnetic 1975 survey of Ceres Nunataks and nearby Astraea Nunatak, this geographical feature is rich in the igneous rocks Diorite and Tonalite as presumed by the rock samples which were observed by BAS during this survey.

== Aeromagnetic Survey of Ceres Nunataks and Astraea Nunatak ==
In December 1975, the British Antarctic Survey (BAS) (originally known as the Falkland Islands Dependencies Survey (FIDS)) embarked on an 8-week long survey observing the proposed theory of Ceres Nunataks and Astraea Nunatak having an aeromagnetic connection between one another. I. A. Crawford and R. W. Girdler embarked on the survey, along with other accompanists and personnel members, flying at a constant barometric altitude of approximately 1130 meters (3707 feet, with an east–west flightline separation of about 7.5 kilometers. Here, they proved that these geographical features were rich in geologic minerals which shared similar characteristics. Data was sampled at one-second intervals, which, at ground speed of approximately 240 kilometers per hour, equates to 15 data points for every kilometer covered. The total distance traveled on the surface was 2200 kilometers (1367 miles). The equipment used included a Geometrics G-803 proton precision magnetometer with both analogue and digital recording, a Bendix DRA-12 Doppler navigation system and Sperry C-12 gyro-magnetic compass, and a Bonzer radio altimeter.

Overall, the 2-month long survey was a successful event and contributed to the history of Alexander Island and the Antarctic Peninsula in itself. Former contributors to this survey include:

- Barker, P. F. - Studied the Cenozoic subduction history of the Antarctic Peninsula region.
- Bell, C. M. - Observed the geology of the southern portion of Alexander Island.
- Bhattacharyya, B. K. - Examined the magnetic anomalies due to prism-shaped bodies with arbitrary polarization.
- Burn R. W. - Studied multiple fields of Alexander Island, such as the early Tertiary calc-alkaline volcanism on the island and researching the geology of the nearby LeMay Mountain Range due 40-50 kilometers north of Staccato Peaks.
- Care, B. W. - Like Burn, Care studied the vast majority of fields involving Alexander Island, such as archiving geographic reports on the Havre Mountains, Lassus Mountains and other miscellaneous peaks within the vicinity of northern Alexander Island.
- Coles R. W. - Conducted two magnetic interpretation methods using rectangular prisms.
- Collinson, D. W. - Created an anisotropic susceptibility meter, along with Molyneux, L. and Stone, D. B.
- Crabtree, R. D. - Constructed a British Antarctic Territory ice thickness map
- Crawford, I. A. - Proposed an analysis of aeromagnetic data over the Staccato Peaks region of Alexander Island, Antarctica, along with Girdler, R. W.
- Edwards, C. W. - Collected early Mesozoic marine fossils from the central portion of Alexander Island.
- Fabiano, E. B. - Observed grid values of total magnetic intensity, along with the help of former geophysicist Peddie, N. W.
- Pankhurst, R. J. - Studied the geochronology of Graham Land, Antarctica.
- Peddie, N. W. - Former geophysicist of BAS.
- Renner R. G. B. - Former member of BAS and accepted the aeromagnetic survey to commence, chief of the 1975 survey.
- Smellie, J. L. - A complete arc-trench system recognized in Gondwana sequences of the Antarctic Peninsula region.
- Streckeisen, A. - Gave to each plutonic body its proper name.
- Suarez, M. - Credited for having charted a Plate-tectonic model for the southern portion of the Antarctic Peninsula (Palmer Land) and its relation to the southern Andes Mountain Range.
