= The Rape of Europa (disambiguation) =

The Rape of Europa was a mythological event involving Europa. It may also refer to:

== Paintings ==
- The Rape of Europa (Titian), a painting of c. 1560 – c. 1562 by Titian
- The Rape of Europa (Rubens), a painting of 1628–1629 by Peter Paul Rubens after Titian
- The Rape of Europa (Reni), a painting of 1637–1639 by Guido Reni
- The Rape of Europa (Jordaens), a painting of 1643 by Jacob Jordaens
- The Rape of Europa (Goya), a painting of 1772 by Francisco Goya

== Other uses ==
- The Rape of Europa (book), a 1994 book about Nazi art theft during World War II
- The Rape of Europa (film), a 2006 documentary film based on the book of the same name
