= Balan Ridge =

Location of Alexander Island in the Antarctic Peninsula region.

Balan Ridge (Bulgarian: хребет Балан, ‘Hrebet Balan’ \'hre-bet ba-'lan\) is the ridge rising in its southern part to 860 m (2,820 ft) in the Sofia University Mountains on Alexander Island in Antarctica. The ridge is situated 7 km (4.3 mi) northeast of Mount Kliment Ohridski, extending 4.5 km (2.8 mi) in the north-south direction, 1.45 km (0.90 mi) wide, and is bounded by Poste Valley to the east, by Palestrina Glacier to the north and its tributary Yozola Glacier to the west.

Balan Ridge is named for the Bulgarian linguist, historian and bibliographer Aleksandar Teodorov-Balan (1859–1959), first rector of Sofia University and one of the founders of the tourist movement in Bulgaria.

== Location ==
Balan Ridge is located at 69°26′10″S 71°22′30″W. British mapping in 1963.

== See also ==
- Arenite Ridge
- Polarstar Ridge
- Grikurov Ridge

== Maps ==
- British Antarctic Territory. Scale 1:200000 topographic map No. 3127. DOS 610 – W 69 70. Tolworth, UK, 1971
- Antarctic Digital Database (ADD). Scale 1:250000 topographic map of Antarctica. Scientific Committee on Antarctic Research (SCAR), 1993–2016.
