= Hyperion Nunataks =

The Hyperion Nunataks (72°4′S 68°55′W) are a group of about 10 nunataks lying south of Saturn Glacier and 8 nautical miles (15 km) west of the Corner Cliffs, in the southeastern part of Alexander Island, Antarctica. The group was first seen and photographed from the air by Lincoln Ellsworth on November 23, 1935, and mapped from these photos by W.L.G. Joerg. It was surveyed in 1949 by the Falkland Islands Dependencies Survey, and so named by the United Kingdom Antarctic Place-Names Committee in association with nearby Saturn Glacier, Hyperion being one of the satellites of the planet Saturn.

== See also ==
- Adams Nunatak
- Knott Nunatak
- Stephenson Nunatak
