= Bizzarrini Europa =

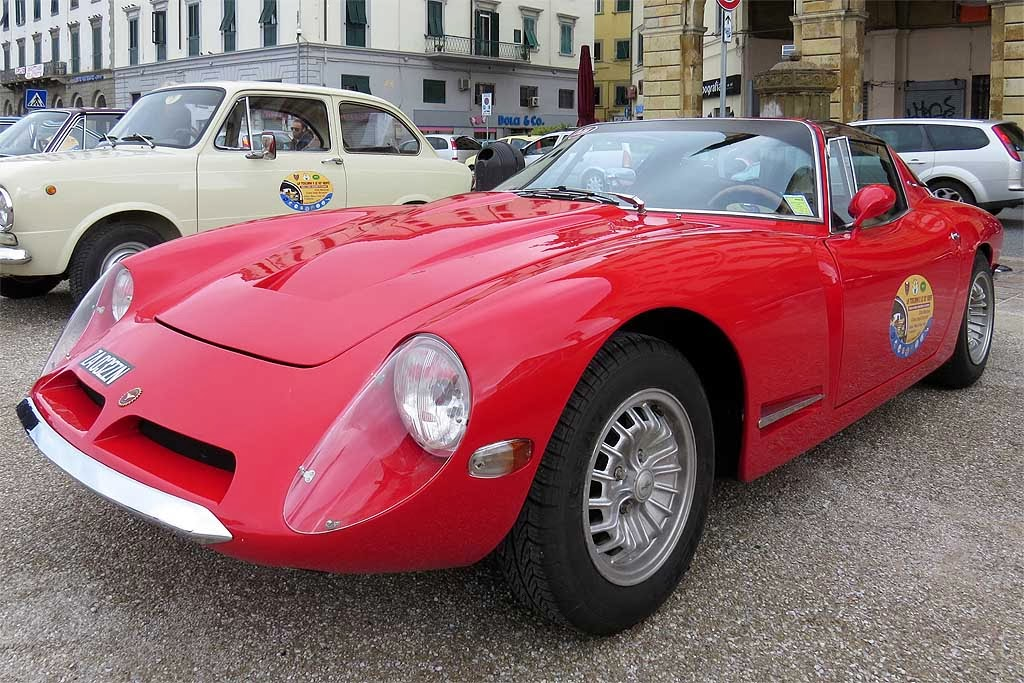

Overview
- Manufacturer: Bizzarrini
- Also called: Bizzarrini 1900 GT Europa
- Production: 1966-1969
- Designer: Pietro Vanni at Bizzarrini

Body and chassis
- Body style: 2-door coupe
- Layout: FMR layout

Powertrain
- Engine: 1.9L (1897 cc) Opel I4

The Bizzarrini Europa is a small grand tourer produced by Bizzarrini between 1966 and 1969.

The Europa was intended to be a smaller, lower cost alternative to the more expensive Strada model that would take Bizzarrini into volume production and compete with sports cars from Alfa Romeo and Lancia. However, due to the bankruptcy of Bizzarrini in 1969, production of the Europa ended after only a handful of cars were built.

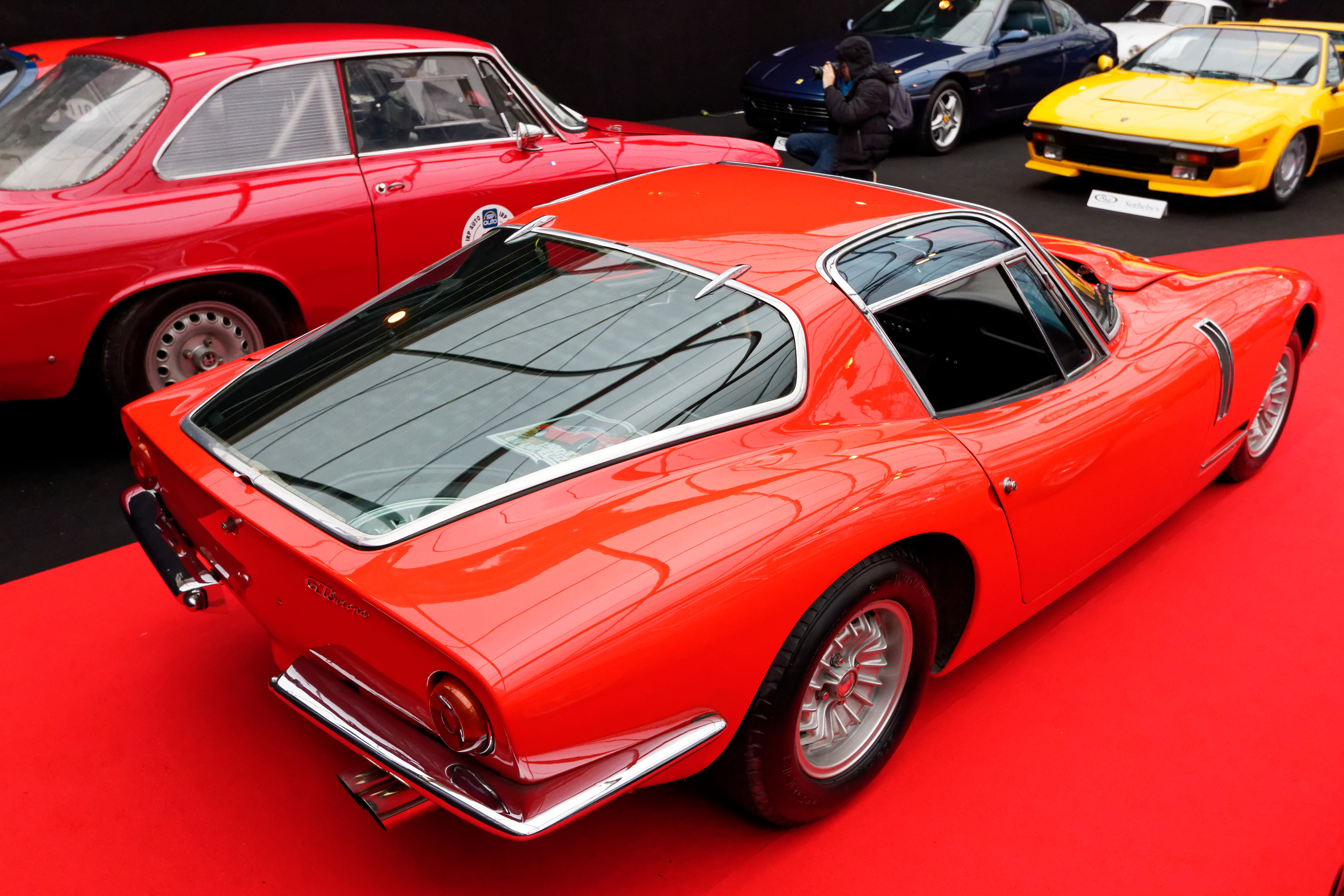
Bizzarrini 1900 GT Europa rear view

Originally powered by a 1,481 cc Fiat inline-four engine, the car officially became the Europa with the introduction of an 1,897 cc Opel engine. The 1.9L engine was mounted behind the front axle, like in the Strada, and produced around 110 hp (82 kW), allowing the Europa to reach a claimed top speed of 128 mph (206 km/h). The Europa also featured a fiberglass body, penned by Bizzarrini designer Pietro Vanni, independent front and rear suspension, a limited-slip differential and four wheel disc brakes. Between 12 and 17 examples were said to have been built by Bizzarrini; the definitive number is unknown, as the factory did not keep records. However, some cars, sources say around 20, were assembled in the late 1960s and early 1970s using Europa parts and unused chassis from the Bizzarrini factory after they went bankrupt. However, these cars were not assembled by Bizzarrini themselves.
