= Ablation Lake =

Lake in Antarctica

- Location within Antarctica
- Location: Ablation Valley, Alexander Island, Antarctica
- Coordinates: 70°49′S 68°26′W
- Type: Proglacial lake
- Primary outflows: channel to George VI Sound

Ablation Lake is a proglacial tidal lake in Ablation Valley, Alexander Island, Antarctica, with stratified saline and fresh water and depths exceeding 117 m (384 ft). The feature is dammed in the upper portion by ice that pushes into the lake from the adjacent George VI Ice Shelf. It is named after Ablation Valley following British Antarctic Survey (BAS) limnological research from 1973. The site lies within Antarctic Specially Protected Area (ASPA) No.147.

The lake has a sub-ice channel connecting it to George VI Sound, and is approximately 500 metres (1,600 ft) below the surface of the ice.

== See also ==
- Ablation Point
