= Hengist Nunatak =

Nunatak on Alexander Island, Antarctica

Hengist Nunatak (69°0′S 70°14′W) is an isolated flat-topped nunatak, more than 610 metres (2,000 ft) in height, which rises above Roberts Ice Piedmont 10 nautical miles (19 km) north of Mount Calais lying in the northeastern extremity of Alexander Island, Antarctica. It was first photographed from the air in 1936 by the British Graham Land Expedition under John Rymill, and was surveyed from the ground in 1948 by the Falkland Islands Dependencies Survey. The names for this feature and for the Horsa Nunataks to the north are for the brother chieftains, Hengist and Horsa, who were believed to have led the first Saxon bands which settled England in the fifth century.
