= Admirals Nunatak =

Nunatak on Alexander Island, Antarctica

Highest point
- Elevation: 925 m (3,035 ft)
- Coordinates: 71°25′S 69°1′W

Geography
- Location: Alexander Island, Antarctica

Admirals Nunatak is a nunatak rising to 925 metres (3,035 ft) on the upper Uranus Glacier, central Alexander Island, Antarctica. The name originates from dog teams named "The Admirals" that served at various British stations in Antarctica, 1952–94, and honors the loyal service of all Falkland Islands Dependencies Survey/BAS sled dogs. The nunatak appears to have some relation to Huns Nunatak which lies about 3.7 miles (6 km) northeast of Admirals Nunatak.
