= Europa (1781 EIC ship) =

History

British East India Company
- Name: Europa
- Namesake: Europa
- Owner: Henry Hinde Pelly
- Builder: Perry, Blackwall
- Launched: 1781
- Fate: Probably broken up c. 1798

General characteristics
- Tons burthen: 755, or 770, or 772, or 773 (bm)
- Length: Overall:143 ft 9 in (43.8 m); Keel:116 ft 8 in (35.6 m) (keel)
- Beam: 35 ft 3 1/2 in (10.8 m)
- Depth of hold: 14 ft 10 in (4.5 m)
- Propulsion: Sails
- Sail plan: Full-rigged ship
- Complement: 1794:105; 1796:105
- Armament: 1794:32 × 9&6-pounder guns; 1796:32 × 9&6-pounder guns
- Notes: Three decks

Europa was launched in 1781, as an East Indiaman. She made six voyages for the British East India Company (EIC). She was probably broken up in 1798.

== Career ==
EIC voyage #1 (1782–1785): Captain William Applegath (or Applegarth) sailed from Portsmouth on 11 September 1782, bound for Bombay. Europa reached Madras on 16 April 1783, and Anjengo on 21 October; she arrived at Bombay on 12 November. She then sailed to the Persian Gulf. She was at Muscat on 11 March 1784. She reached Bushire on 5 April, and arrived at Basara on 29 May. On her way back to Bombay she returned to Bushire on 17 July, and Muscat on 30 August, and arrived at Bombay on 12 September. Homeward bound, she was at St Helena on 7 April 1785. Applegath died there on 21 April. His chief mate was Charles Gardyne. Europa reached Ascension on 2 May, and arrived at The Downs on 7 July.

EIC voyage #2 (1786–1787): Captain Augustus Joseph Applegath sailed from The Downs on 20 February 1786, bound for Madras and China. Europa reached Johanna on 12 June, and Madras on 15 July. She arrived at Whampoa anchorage on 15 November. Homeward bound, she crossed the Second Bar on 18 February 1787, reached at St Helena on 30 June, and arrived at The Downs on 19 September.

EIC voyage #3 (1788–1790): Captain A.J. Applegath sailed from Portsmouth on 11 February 1789, bound for Madras and China. Europa reached Madras on 11 June and Penang on 9 August, and arrived at Whampoa on 26 September. Homeward bound, she crossed the Second Bar on 3 January 1790, reached St Helena on 31 March, and arrived at The Downs on 2 June.

EIC voyage #4 (1792–1793): Captain A.J. Applegath sailed from Torbay on 9 February 1792, bound for Bengal. Europa reached São Tiago on 7 March, and arrived at Madras on 30 June. She then arrived at Diamond Harbour on 5 August. She left Bengal in October and reached the Cape of Good Hope on 5 January 1793, and St Helena on 29 January. She arrived at The Downs on 17 April.

EIC voyage #5 (1794–1795): War with France had broken out shortly before Europa had returned from her last voyage. Captain A.J. Applegarth acquired a letter of marque on 6 January 1794.

The British government held Europa at Portsmouth, together with 38 other Indiamen in anticipation of using them as transports for an attack on Île de France (Mauritius). The government gave up the plan and released the vessels in May 1794. It paid £850 for having delayed her departure by 42 days.

Captain A.J. Applegath sailed from Portsmouth on 2 May, bound for Bengal and Bencoolen. Europa arrived at Diamond Harbour on 12 September. She then sailed for Bengal. She was at Saugor on 14 December and reached Madras on 23 January 1795. She arrived at Bencoolen on 14 April, reached St Helena on 30 July, and arrived at The Downs on 20 November.

EIC voyage #6 (1796–1798): Captain Charles Jones acquired a letter of marque on 3 March 1796. Europa sailed from Portsmouth on 17 May 1796, bound for Bengal and Bencoolen. Europa reached Madras on 10 September and arrived at Diamond Harbour on 24 September. She continued her voyage and was at Saugor on 8 November, Madras again on 3 February 1797, and arrived at Bencoolen on 5 May. She visited Manna on 14 June and returned to Bencoolen on 8 July. Homeward bound, she was at the Cape of 26 October and St Helena on 3 December; she arrived at The Downs on 31 January 1798.

== Fate ==
Europa was probably sold for breaking up in 1798. She does not appear in Lloyd's Register or the Register of Shipping.
