= Europa Magazine =

Bosnian language magazine

- Europa Magazine cover, August 2007
- Editor-in-Chief: Haris Delalić
- Categories: Newsmagazine
- Frequency: Monthly
- Circulation: 30,000 / month
- First issue: August 1, 2005
- Country: United States
- Based in: Atlanta
- Language: Bosnian, Croatian, Serbian
- Website: EuropaMagazine.info
- ISSN: 1939-3423

Europa Magazine is the only monthly magazine in the Bosnian language in the United States.

== Overview ==
The first edition of the Europa Magazine was published in Atlanta on August 1, 2005.

== Editors-in-chief ==
- Since 2005 : Haris Delalić
