= Venus Glacier =

Glacier in Antarctica

Venus Glacier (71°38′S 68°15′W) is a glacier on the east coast of Alexander Island, Antarctica, 10 nautical miles (18 km) long and 6 nautical miles (11 km) wide at its mouth flowing east into George VI Sound lying between Keystone Cliffs and Triton Point. The coast in this vicinity was first seen from the air by Lincoln Ellsworth on November 23, 1935 and roughly mapped from photos obtained on that flight by W.L.G. Joerg. The glacier was first surveyed in 1949 by the Falkland Islands Dependencies Survey and named by the United Kingdom Antarctic Place-Names Committee for the planet Venus, the second planet of the Solar System.

== See also ==
- Jupiter Glacier
- Pluto Glacier
- Uranus Glacier
