= Polarstar Ridge =

Ridge trending in the Staccato Peaks, Alexander Island, Antarctica

Polarstar Ridge (71°49′S 70°29′W) is a jagged ridge, 4 nautical miles (7 km) long, trending southwest from The Obelisk in the Staccato Peaks, situated in the southern portion of Alexander Island, Antarctica. The ridge was named by the Advisory Committee on Antarctic Names (US-ACAN) after the Polar Star, the low-wing monoplane from which Lincoln Ellsworth, with pilot Herbert Hollick-Kenyon, discovered and photographed this ridge and the Staccato Peaks on November 23, 1935.

== See also ==
- Balan Ridge
- Phobos Ridge
- Probe Ridge
