= Coal Nunatak =

Coal Nunatak (72°7′S 68°32′W) is a flat-topped rock mass with steep cliffs facing south, standing 2 nautical miles (4 km) southwest of Corner Cliffs on the southeast corner of Alexander Island, Antarctica. Lincoln Ellsworth first noted it from the air on November 23, 1935, and mapped it from photos obtained on that flight by W.L.G. Joerg. Observed from the northwest (the direction from which Ellsworth photographed this nunatak), only the summit protrudes above the coastal ice, and it was uncertain whether this was a peak on Alexander Island or an island in George VI Sound. Its true nature was determined by the Falkland Islands Dependencies Survey (FIDS) who visited and surveyed this nunatak in 1949. So named by FIDS for exposures of thin lenses of coal occur there.

== Middle Cretaceous fossil forests ==
On the south end and the summit of Coal Nunataka, an extensive mid-Cretaceous (Albian) fossil forest is exposed on a single bedding plane within the Triton Point Formation of the Fossil Bluff Group. The floor of this fossil forest occurs 1.45-metre (4.8 ft) from the top of the outcrop and is exposed over an area of about 25-by-38-metre (82 ft × 125 ft). This fossil forest consists of 54 in situ stumps that vary in diameter from 8 to 22 cm (3.1 to 8.7 in). The stumps are spaced 3-to-5-metre (9.8 to 16.4 ft) apart. These stumps have eroded out of a layer of coarse, brown, fluvial sandstone that contains a large amount of volcanic sediment. Where the associated forest floor is covered by white tuffaceous sandstone, parts of the trunks are totally carbonized. Two other distinct fossil forests with standing trunks are exposed in the cliffs of the south end of Coal Nunatak. Another, less well exposed, fossil forest outcrops on the north end of Coal Nunatak. These fossil forests are associated with paleosols and leaf fossils.
