= Ablation Point =

Headland in Antarctica

Coordinates: 70°48′S 68°22′W

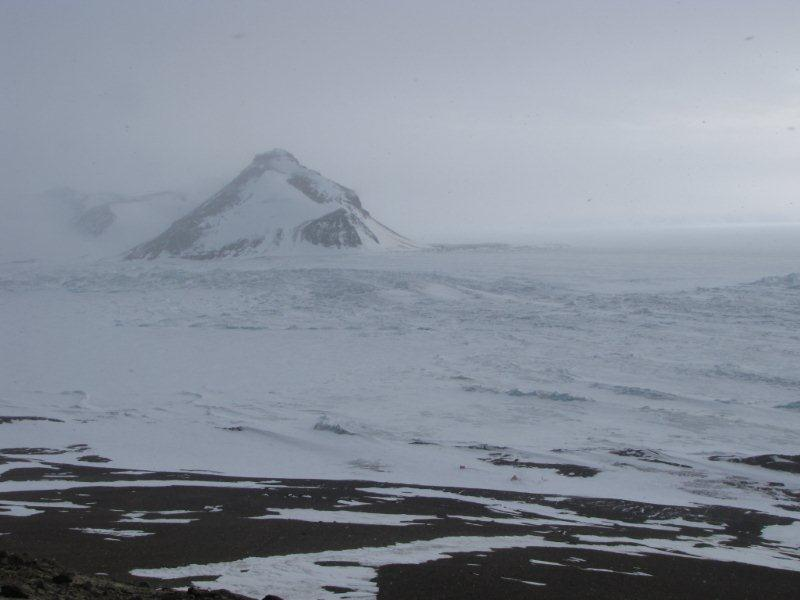
Ablation point

Ablation Point, also known as Punta Ablación, is the eastern extremity of a hook-shaped rock ridge marking the north side of the entrance to Ablation Valley, on the east coast of Alexander Island, Antarctica. It was first photographed from the air on 23 November 1935 by Lincoln Ellsworth and mapped from these photographs by W.L.G. Joerg. It was roughly surveyed in 1936 by the British Graham Land Expedition (BGLE) and resurveyed in 1949 by the Falkland Islands Dependencies Survey (FIDS). It was named by FIDS for nearby Ablation Valley. The site lies within Antarctic Specially Protected Area (ASPA) No.147.

== Geology ==
Ablation Point is the namesake and type locality of the Cretaceous Ablation Point Formation. At the type section, cliffs on the east facing scarp of Ablation Point, expose a minimum thickness of 350 m (1,150 ft) of the Ablation Point Formation. As elsewhere in the region, the base of it is not exposed. At Ablation Point, this formation is characterized by a wide range of slump-folded and rafted blocks of sedimentary and volcanic strata that occur chaotic, laterally discontinuous beds that are part of the deposits a single, large, deep-sea submarine slump. The blocks consist largely of sandstones, interbedded sandstones and mudstones, ignimbrites, lavas, tuffs, volcaniclastic sandstones, rare breccias and conglomerates. Intercalated with the blocks are sedimentary mélanges consisting of sandstone blocks surrounded by a sheared mudstone matrix. These mélanges occur as layers that are as much as 200 m (660 ft) thick and 2 km (1.2 mi) in lateral extent. They contain coherent blocks of interbedded sedimentary and volcanic rocks that are as much as 50 m (160 ft) thick and 500 m (1,600 ft) in lateral extent. The Ablation Point Formation exhibits numerous internal unconformities and irregular, erosional contacts. Exposures of this formation are limited to the eastern and central area of the Ganymede Heights, including of Ablation Point and Belemnite points. Fossils of ammonites, belemnites, and bivalves are sparse and poorly preserved within the Ablation Point Formation. Base on these fossils, this formation was originally interpreted as being late Oxfordian-Kimmeridgian (Late Jurassic). However, it is now regarded to be Kimmeridgian.

At Ablation Point, the Ablation Point Formation is conformitably overlain by a few tens of meters of the Himalia Ridge Formation. It consists of conglomerates, immature arkosic sandstones, and mudstones which were deposited in deep sea fans. The strata of Himalia Ridge Formation is only the base of a 2.7 km (1.7 mi) thick sequence of Late Jurassic to Early Cretaceous sediments deposited in a north–south elongate forearc basin and sourced from a andesitic volcanic arc.

== See also ==
- Ablation Lake
- Belemnite Point
- Himalia Ridge
