= Belemnite Point =

Headland in Antarctica

Belemnite Point (70°40′S 68°32′W) is the eastern extremity of a mainly ice-free, hook-shaped ridge, midway between Lamina Peak and Ablation Point and 2 nautical miles (4 km) inland from George VI Sound on the east coast of Alexander Island, Antarctica. It was first photographed from the air on November 23, 1935, by Lincoln Ellsworth and mapped from these photos by W.L.G. Joerg. Roughly surveyed in 1936 by the British Graham Land Expedition and resurveyed in 1949 by the Falkland Islands Dependencies Survey (FIDS), it was so named by FIDS because of belemnite fossils found in the outcropping marine strata.

At Belemnite Point, which lies 20 km (12 mi) to the north of Ablation Point, a 5 km (3.1 mi)-long cliff exposes 510 m (1,670 ft) thickness of the lower part of the Himalia Formation and the at least the 300 m (980 ft) of the upper part of the underlying Ablation Point Formation. The Ablation Point Formation at Belemnite Point consists predominantly of slump-folded and rafted blocks of turbidite sandstone interbedded with chaotic, mudstone-rich matrix. Deformation within the Ablation Point Formation varies from well-mixed sediment to coherently offset and imbricated slide sheets often bounded by well-defined low-angle faults

== See also ==
- Ablation Point
- Arenite Ridge
