= Ablation Valley =

Valley in Antarctica

Coordinates: 70°48′S 68°30′W

Ablation Valley, also known as Ablation Bay, is a mainly ice-free valley on the east coast of Alexander Island, 3 km (1.9 mi) long, which is entered immediately south of Ablation Point, opens on George VI Sound and lies immediately north of Ganymede Heights. It was first photographed from the air on 23 November 1935 by Lincoln Ellsworth and mapped from these photographs by W.L.G. Joerg. It was first visited and surveyed in 1936 by the British Graham Land Expedition (BGLE), and given the name "Ablation" by them because of the relatively small amounts of snow and ice found there. The site lies within Antarctic Specially Protected Area (ASPA) No.147.

== Climate ==
The climate of the area is affected by easterly-moving cyclonic depressions of the Southern Ocean. These depressions make the weather relatively mild; bring strong northerly winds and a heavy cloud cover to the region. The climate is also characterized by continental north to northwesterly flow of cold anticyclone air from the West Antarctic Ice Sheet. This flow brings clear, cold and stable conditions, relatively light winds from the south, and negative temperatures. The mean summer temperature recorded in the early 1970s was estimated as just below 0 °C (32 °F). The mean annual temperature was estimated at -9 °C (16 °F) in the same time period. There is also a little snow falling in summer. The area is mostly free of snow by the end of summer.

== Ecology of fresh water ==
There are many lakes, ponds and streams that are rich in benthic flora. The period from late December until February is the season when running water appears from three main sources. Those are: downfalls, melting of glaciers and from melting of the George VI Ice Shelf. Streams are usually several kilometers in length, and they run through glaciers and snowfields. The main streams flow down into Ablation Lake and Moutonnee Lake. In summer period there are surface melt water pools formed in hollows between lake ridges. Many elongated pools and ponds vary in length from 10 to 1500 m and up to 200 m in width, and have depths ranging from 1 to 6 m. The level of these pools and ponds rise in the melt period. However, water may drain through sub-ice fissures that open in the ice shelf. Turbidity of pools/ponds depends on the presence of glacial sediments. In summer large ponds are usually partially covered with ice, whereas pools are usually free of ice in this period. On the territory of the valley there are numerous ponds that have depth of 1 to 15 m. Many of these ponds are covered with moss, sometimes down to 9 m in depth. Campylium polygamum and Dicranella mostly dominate and have a length of 30 cm. There are also such species as Bryum pseudotriquetrum, Distichium capillaceum that grow at or below 1 m in depth. In the 0.5-5.0 m depth zone moss cover can reach 40-80%, and dense cyanobacterial felts that are up to 10 cm thick often cover most of the left area. The main representatives of these cyanobacterial felts are Calothrix, Nostoc and Phormidium.

== Birds in the area ==
Explorers have seen south polar skuas (Catharacta maccormicki). The birds nest close to moist and vegetated areas. Also, snow petrels (Pagodroma nivea) have been found breeding close to the Ablation Point.

== Scientific activities ==
- 1936 - The first visit to the Ablation Valley area by members of the British Graham Land Expedition. Around 100 fossil specimens were collected from near Ablation Point.
- The next visit was about a decade later. The purpose was to undertake basic geological descriptions and more fossil collecting.
- 1960s through to the 1980s - British geologists conducted more intensive palaeontological investigations with detailed studies of the geomorphology.
- 1970s - Limnological investigations were undertaken.
- 1980s and 1990s - expeditions examining the terrestrial biology were initiated.
- Since 2000 scientific activities have been focused on palaeoclimatological research.

== See also ==
- Ablation Lake
- Ablation Point
