= Cannonball Cliffs =

Cliffs on Alexander Island, Antarctica

The Cannonball Cliffs (71°47′S 68°15′W) are cliffs at the south side of the terminus of Neptune Glacier on the east side of Alexander Island, Antarctica. The feature consists of two east–west ridges about 500 metres (1,600 ft) high, joined by a narrow north–south ridge. The feature was mapped from trimetrogon air photography taken by the Ronne Antarctic Research Expedition, 1947–1948, and from survey by the Falkland Islands Dependencies Survey, 1948–1950. The name was applied by the UK Antarctic Place-Names Committee for the sandstone in the area, which contains numerous spherical, brown concretions known as "cannon-ball" concretions.

== See also ==
- Burn Cliffs
- Corner Cliffs
- Callisto Cliffs
