= Mars Glacier =

Glacier in Antarctica

Coordinates: 71°54′S 68°23′W

Mars Glacier is a glacier in the southeastern corner of Alexander Island, Antarctica, 6 nautical miles (11 km) long and 2 nautical miles (4 km) wide, flowing south into the George VI Ice Shelf. The glacier lies between Two Step Cliffs and Phobos Ridge. Mars Glacier was first sighted from the air by Lincoln Ellsworth on November 23, 1935, and roughly mapped from photos obtained on that flight by W.L.G. Joerg. It was first surveyed in 1949 by the Falkland Islands Dependencies Survey and named by the UK Antarctic Place-Names Committee for the planet Mars, the fourth planet from the sun in the Solar System.

Although Mars Glacier is not located within the Planet Heights mountain range, it lies nearby, and its name derives from it, along with many other nearby glaciers and landmarks located here which are named after planets, satellites and astrophysicists.

== See also ==
- Mercury Glacier
- Saturn Glacier
- Venus Glacier
- Two Step Moraine
