= Phobos Ridge =

Phobos Ridge (71°52′S 68°30′W) is a rocky ridge of sandstones and shales forming the west side of Mars Glacier in the southeast corner of Alexander Island, Antarctica. The coast in this vicinity was first seen from the air by Lincoln Ellsworth on November 23, 1935, and roughly mapped from photos obtained on that flight by W.L.G. Joerg. This ridge was first surveyed in 1949 by the Falkland Islands Dependencies Survey (FIDS) and named by the United Kingdom Antarctic Place-Names Committee (UK-APC) for its association with adjacent Mars Glacier, Phobos being the inner of the two satellites of the planet Mars, the fourth planet of the Solar System.

== See also ==
- Arenite Ridge
- Himalia Ridge
- Offset Ridge
