= Corner Cliffs =

The Corner Cliffs (72°4′S 68°25′W) are a rocky mass surmounted by two flat-topped summits 1.5 nautical miles (3 km), immediately south of Saturn Glacier and lying 2 nautical miles (4 km) northeast of Coal Nunatak in the southeast part of Alexander Island, Antarctica. The rocks of these cliffs were hidden from the line of sight by intervening ice slopes to the west, but the two rock ridges forming the northwest shoulder of this feature were first seen and photographed from the air by Lincoln Ellsworth on November 23, 1935, and mapped from these photos by W.L.G. Joerg. The cliffs were first surveyed in 1949 by the Falkland Islands Dependencies Survey, who gave this name to mark the point where the exposed rock of eastern Alexander Island turns from a north–south direction toward the southwest.

== See also ==
- Burn Cliffs
- Callisto Cliffs
- Cannonball Cliffs
