= Two Step Cliffs =

Topographic feature on Alexander Island, Antarctica

Two Step Cliffs (71°54′S 68°13′W) is the eastern face of a flat-topped sedimentary mountain, rising to about 680 m, immediately east of Mars Glacier on the east coast of Alexander Island, Antarctica. At the bottom of the cliffs is the Two Step Moraine. First seen from the air by Lincoln Ellsworth on November 23, 1935, and mapped from photos obtained on that flight by W.L.G. Joerg. Roughly surveyed from the ground in 1936 by the British Graham Land Expedition and in 1940-41 by the United States Antarctic Service, who used the names "Two Step Mountains" and "Table Mountain" for this feature. The name Two Step Cliffs derives from the name used by USAS, and was suggested by Falkland Islands Dependencies Survey following surveys in 1949 as being particularly descriptive of this feature.
