= Uranus Glacier =

Glacier in Antarctica

Uranus Glacier (71°24′S 68°20′W) is a glacier on the east coast of Alexander Island, Antarctica, 30 kilometres (20 miles) long and 10 km (6 mi) wide at its mouth, flowing east into George VI Sound immediately south of Fossil Bluff. Along the south face of the glacier is an east–west escarpment called Kuiper Scarp.

The glacier was likely first seen by Lincoln Ellsworth, who flew directly over it and photographed the glacier and other segments of the coast on November 23, 1935. The portion near the mouth of the glacier was first roughly surveyed in 1936 by the British Graham Land Expedition.

It was named by the United Kingdom Antarctic Place-Names Committee for the planet Uranus following the resurvey of its lower portions by the Falkland Islands Dependencies Survey in 1948 and 1949. Although the glacier is named for a planet of the Solar System, it is not named in association with the nearby mountain range Planet Heights.

The entire glacier was mapped from air photos taken by the Ronne Antarctic Research Expedition in 1947–48, by Derek J.H. Searle of the FIDS in 1960.

== See also ==
- Mars Glacier
- Mercury Glacier
- Venus Glacier
