= LeMay Range =

Mountain range in Antarctica

Highest point
- Elevation: 2,050 m (6,730 ft)
- Prominence: 1,013 m (3,323 ft)
- Listing: Ribu

The LeMay Range (70°55′S 69°20′W) is a mountain range 40 nautical miles (70 km) long with peaks rising to 2,000 metres (6,600 ft), extending in a northwest–southeast direction from Snick Pass to the north side of Uranus Glacier in the central portion of Alexander Island, Antarctica. It was first seen from the air by Lincoln Ellsworth on November 23, 1935, and the north and east portions mapped from photos obtained on that flight by W.L.G. Joerg. Later, it was resighted from the air by the Ronne Antarctic Research Expedition (RARE), 1947–48, and named by Finn Ronne for General Curtis LeMay, Deputy Chief of Air Staff for Research and Development of the then United States Army Air Forces, which furnished equipment for the expedition. The range was remapped in detail from RARE photos by D. Searle of the Falkland Islands Dependencies Survey in 1960.

== See also ==
- Douglas Range
- Stellar Crests
