= Jupiter Glacier =

Glacier in Antarctica

Jupiter Glacier (70°57′S 68°30′W) is a glacier on the east coast of Alexander Island, Antarctica, 10 nautical miles (19 km) long and 5 nautical miles (9 km) wide at its mouth, which flows east into George VI Sound to the south of Ablation Valley. It was first photographed from the air on November 23, 1935, by Lincoln Ellsworth and mapped from these photos by W.L.G. Joerg. It was roughly surveyed in 1936 by the British Graham Land Expedition, and was named for the planet Jupiter by the Falkland Islands Dependencies Survey following their surveys in 1948 and 1949.

The glacier lies north of Planet Heights, although Jupiter Glacier is not situated within the mountain range, the glacier (along with many other nearby glaciers named after planets of the Solar System) is so named under the association of Planet Heights even though it is not directly a glacier located within this mountainous range.

== See also ==
- Mars Glacier, in the southeastern corner of Alexander Island
- Mercury Glacier, on the east coast of Alexander Island
- Nonplus Crag, near the head of Jupiter Glacier in the E-central part of Alexander Island
- Saturn Glacier, lying in southeast Alexander Island
