= Planet Heights =

Topographic feature on Alexander Island, Antarctica

Planet Heights (71°13′S 68°47′W) is a series of summits running along an ice-free ridge, extending 24 nautical miles (44 km) in a north-south direction between the southernmost extremity of the LeMay Range and George VI Sound in the east part of Alexander Island, Antarctica. Many landforms and nearby features are named in association with this mountain range; some of these include landforms named after astronomers, satellites, planets and other things related to astrology and astrophysics. The mountain range was first mapped from air photos taken by the Ronne Antarctic Research Expedition (RARE), 1947–48, by Searle of the Falkland Islands Dependencies Survey (FIDS) in 1960. Named by the United Kingdom Antarctic Place-Names Committee (UK-APC) from association with the nearby glaciers named for planets of the Solar System. The only planet that is not featured in any of these glaciers is the planet Earth, as there are no glaciers named "Earth Glacier" and this glacier does not exist.

== Glaciers ==
- Mercury Glacier 71°34′S 68°14′W
- Venus Glacier 71°38′S 68°15′W
- Mars Glacier 71°54′S 68°23′W
- Jupiter Glacier 70°57′S 68°30′W
- Saturn Glacier 72°0′S 68°35′W
- Uranus Glacier 71°24′S 68°20′W
- Neptune Glacier 71°44′S 68°17′W
- Pluto Glacier 71°7′S 68°22′W
