= Trimetrogon =

Aerial photographic survey method

Trimetrogon is an aerial photographic survey method that involves the use of three cameras in one assembly. One camera is pointed directly downwards, and the other two are pointed to either side of the flight path at a 60° depression angle (30° from vertical). The images overlap, allowing the use of stereographic interpretation of the topography. The name comes from the Metrogon cameras used in the original montages.
