= Saturn Glacier =

Glacier in Antarctica

Saturn Glacier (72°0′S 68°35′W) is a glacier lying in southeast Alexander Island, Antarctica. The glacier is 15 nautical miles (28 km) long and 6 nautical miles (11 km) wide, flowing southeast into the George VI Ice Shelf of George VI Sound north of Corner Cliffs. Although the glacier is not situated within Planet Heights, its name derives from the nearby mountain range (Planet Heights) along with many other glaciers named after planets of the Solar System. The nunataks at the head of the glacier are also named after solar system features, for example the Enceladus Nunataks named for a moon of Saturn. The coast in this vicinity was first seen from the air by Lincoln Ellsworth on November 23, 1935, and roughly mapped from photos obtained on that flight by W.L.G. Joerg. The glacier was surveyed in 1949 by the Falkland Islands Dependencies Survey (FIDS) and named by the United Kingdom Antarctic Place-Names Committee (UK-APC) for the planet Saturn, the sixth planet of the Solar System.

== See also ==
- Jupiter Glacier
- Uranus Glacier
- Venus Glacier
