= W. L. G. Joerg =

Early 20th-century American geographer and archivist

Wolfgang Louis Gottfried Joerg, better known as W. L. G. Joerg (February 6, 1885 – January 7, 1952), was an American geographer, and in particular an expert in the geography of the Arctic and Antarctic regions, who exercised broad influence on the field in various positions, ultimately as Chief Archivist of the Cartographic Records Branch of the National Archives.

Joerg was born in Brooklyn, New York. A prodigy, Joerg graduated from the Brooklyn Polytechnic Preparatory School at the age of fourteen. He was fluent in many languages, and studied in Germany, at Thomas Gymnasium and the University of Leipzig, from 1901 to 1904, then studied geography and surveying at Columbia University for a year. After returning to Germany for a five year stint at the University of Göttingen, Joerg entered into employment with the American Geographical Society in 1911, where he would remain until 1937, when he left the Society to accept the post of Chief of the Division of Maps and Charts in the National Archives and Records Administration in Washington, D.C. Joerg was the first employee of the Society to have had advanced university training in modern geography.

Joerg published many books and articles on geography, including volumes on the geography of the polar regions. Although he personally never travelled to the polar regions, he was considered to be the world's greatest expert on the geography of these regions.

His early death was caused by a cerebral hemorrhage.

Commendation by the United States Board on Geographic Names

The United States Board on Geographic Names (BGN), at the 25th Meeting of the Board held on January 15, 1952, adopted a resolution commending W.L.G. Joerg. The commendation reads as follows:

WHEREAS in the death of W.L.G. Joerg on January 7, 1952 the Board on Geographic Names has lost a true friend and trusted advisor who served as a member of the United States Board on Geographic Names from June 9, 1938 and as its chairman from March 18, 1940 until its replacement by the present Board on July 10, 1947, and

WHEREAS he served as a chairman of the Special Committee on Antarctic Names from its inception on July 23, 1943 to July 25, 1947, and as a member of the succeeding Advisory Committee on Antarctic Names until his death and

WHEREAS his extraordinary knowledge of geography, geographers, exploration and scientific literature in several languages, his unwavering devotion to truth and scholarship, and his deep understanding of the principles of geographic nomenclature are reflected in all of the Board's successes from the time he joined it, and

WHEREAS his warm human kindness, modesty and integrity generated both affection and respect for him in all who came to know him: Now, therefore, be it

RESOLVED, That the Board on Geographic Names in regular meeting assembled, humbly acknowledges its great debt to the late W.L.G. Joerg, and proudly holds aloft as a beacon his example of selfless service to his fellow men; and be it further

RESOLVED, That this resolution be spread upon the minutes of this Board, and that a copy be transmitted to his widow.
