= List of University of Texas at San Antonio people =

The list of University of Texas at San Antonio (UTSA) people includes notable alumni, faculty, and affiliates of UTSA. The term "UTSA" is used more commonly than University of Texas at San Antonio, and the term "Roadrunners" is commonly used to refer to students and alumni of UTSA.

== UTSA alumni ==
=== Academia, science, and technology ===
Name	Notability	Reference
Meredith Hay	biomedical researcher, professor, and former provost of the University of Arizona	
Farnam Jahanian	president of Carnegie Mellon University	
Burcu Özsoy	Turkish scientist and Director of the Istanbul Technical University Polar Research Center (PolReC), the first Turkish polar research center	

=== Athletics ===
Name	Notability	Reference
Justin Anderson	MLB pitcher for the Los Angeles Angels	
John Bormann	MLB catcher for the Pittsburgh Pirates	
Bruce Bowen	former NBA player for the San Antonio Spurs, attended and received credit for public relations classes	
Devin Brown	former NBA player for the San Antonio Spurs and NBA Champion (2005)	
Michael Connell	professional golfer	
Marcus Davenport	football player, selected in the first round of the 2018 NFL draft by the New Orleans Saints	
Johan Edfors	professional golfer	
Richard Fröhlich	German basketball player	
Derrick Gervin	former NBA player (brother of George Gervin), 1995 Israeli Basketball Premier League MVP	
Frank Harris	UTSA football quarterback; Conference USA Most Valuable Player in 2022	
Alexander Hernandez	professional mixed martial artist, currently in the UFC's Lightweight Division	
Phil Hui	professional poker player and the winner of the $50,000 Poker Players Championship at the 2019 World Series of Poker; played golf at the University of Texas-San Antonio and professionally before turning to poker	
Liza Hunter-Galvan	Olympian in the 2004 Summer Olympics (Athens) and 2008 Summer Olympics (Beijing)	
Leroy Hurd	professional basketball player currently with the Italian team Sebastiani Rieti	
Ben Lectome	B.B.A. Marketing '95; first to swim across the Atlantic Ocean from Cape Cod to the French shore of Quiberon without the aid of a flotation device or kickboard; later made a historic swim across the Pacific Ocean, chronicled in the full-length documentary The Swim by Discovery	
Les Maruo	professional football player; 4th overall pick in the 2021 CFL Draft	
David Morgan II	tight end for the Minnesota Vikings; became UTSA's first draftee in the NFL when the Vikings selected him in the sixth round of the 2016 NFL Draft	
Bill Peters	NHL head coach of the Calgary Flames	
Brian Price	football player, signed by the Green Bay Packers as an undrafted free agent in 2016	
María José Rojas	Class of '14; Chilean professional footballer; has played for the Chilean National women's soccer team on several occasions but most notably in the 2019 FIFA Women's World Cup; first Chilean female player to be contracted internationally	
Kevin Strong	NFL player, defensive tackle for the Detroit Lions	
Josiah Tauaefa	NFL player, linebacker for the New York Giants	
Triston Wade	NFL player, free safety for the Seattle Seahawks	
Teddy Williams	NFL player for the Carolina Panthers, played in Super Bowl 50	
Tariq Woolen	NFL player, Super Bowl LX champion, and first UTSA football player to make the Pro Bowl	

=== Arts and literature ===
Name	Notability	Reference
Susan Budge	M.F.A. '99; internationally known ceramic sculptor artist with works included in the permanent collections of the Smithsonian, the Honolulu Museum of Art, the Daum Museum of Contemporary Art, the San Antonio Museum of Art, the San Angelo Museum of Art, the Art Museum at Northern Arizona State University, the Art Museum of South Texas, and the New Orleans Museum of Art	
Rafael C. Castillo	author of Distant Journeys and Aurora; Op-Ed Arts writer for San Antonio Express-News	
Rolando Gomez	B.A. '01; professional photographer, author, and Defense Meritorious Service Medal recipient	
Marcia Gygli King	'80 M.F.A; artist with works in the Guggenheim Museum, Brooklyn Museum, Newark Museum, Cleveland Museum of Art, San Antonio Museum of Art, McNay Art Museum and National Museum of Women in the Arts	
Jimmy Kuehnle	contemporary artist and professor at the Cleveland Institute of Art	
Marilyn Lanfear	artist with works in the permanent collections of the San Antonio Museum of Art, Art Museum of South Texas, and Crystal Bridges Museum of American Art	
Deanna Raybourn	New York Times and USA Today bestselling novelist	
Dario Robleto	B.F.A. '97; conceptual artist with works profiled in numerous publications and media including Radiolab, Krista Tippet's On Being, and The New York Times	
Kathy Vargas	'84; internationally acclaimed artist with works in the Smithsonian American Art Museum's permanent collection	

=== Business and law ===
Name	Notability	Reference
James Bodenstedt	'96 president/CEO of MUY Companies	
James Mbowe Nyondo	Malawian lawyer; development worker; presidential candidate of Malawi	

=== Film, journalism, television, and theatre ===
Name	Notability	Reference
Michelle Beadle	sports TV host for ESPN	
JC Caylen	YouTube personality with millions of followers; nominated for Best Ensemble Cast in Escape the Night; appeared in Boo! A Madea Halloween and Boo 2! A Madea Halloween	
Dayna Devon	actress, journalist and co-host of the infotainment show Extra	
Julian S. Garcia	retired school teacher; short story writer; former Associate Editor of ViAztlan, international journal of arts and letters	
Freddy Lockhart	comedian, actor, writer, and producer	
Kim Spradlin	CBS' Survivor: One World winner	

=== Military ===
Name	Notability	Reference
Anthony J. Rock	United States Air Force inspector general	
Sarah E. Zabel	major general in the US Air Force, director of the Information Technology Acquisition process Development, Office of the US Air Force, and former vice director of the US Defense Information Systems Agency	

=== Music ===
Name	Notability	Reference
AJ Castillo	Tejano artist	
Travis Scott	rapper and record producer	

=== Politics ===
Name	Notability	Reference
María Antonietta Berriozábal	activist, Harvard Fellow, and author; in 1981, first Hispanic woman to serve on the city council of San Antonio, where she served District One for ten years before running for mayor in 1991; member of the Mathematical Sciences Education Board at Harvard University	
Rosie Castro	M.P.A. '83; civil rights activist, educator, and poet; former interim Dean of Student Affairs at Palo Alto College; member of the San Antonio Women's Hall of Fame; mother of former presidential candidate Julian Castro and House Representative Joaquin Castro	
Elisa Chan	first Asian-American and first immigrant member of the San Antonio City Council, serving one term, 2009–2013	
Philip Cortez	Democratic member of the Texas House of Representatives; previously state representative for House District 117 during the 83rd Legislative Session; serves in the United States Air Force Reserve	
Monica De La Cruz	member of the U.S. House of Representatives and the first Republican to represent Texas's 15th congressional district	
Trey Martinez Fischer	Democratic member of the Texas House of Representatives who represents the 116th District, serving since 2019; previously held this seat 2000–2017; named one of the "10 Best Legislators" by Texas Monthly magazine in 2013 and 2015	
Roland Gutierrez	member of the Texas State Senate from the 119th District; formerly served in the Texas House of Representatives and was the driving force in establishing Texas A&M University at San Antonio; UTSA class of '95	
Christian Menefee	Member of the U.S. House of Representatives and first African American elected county attorney of Harris County, Texas	
Tammy Morales	B.A.; member of the Seattle City Council from District 2	
Rolando Pablos	former Texas secretary of state; class of '94	
Leo Pacheco	M.P.A., Democratic member of the Texas House of Representatives, representing District 118	
Howard W. Peak	former mayor of San Antonio, 1997–2001; Class of 1975	
Sylvia Romo	tax assessor-collector for Bexar County; former member of the Texas House of Representatives, first woman elected to this position	
Emmy Ruiz	White House director of Political Strategy and Outreach for the Joe Biden administration	
Mario Marcel Salas	civil rights leader	

== UTSA faculty and affiliates ==
Name	Notability	Reference
Guy Bailey	former UTSA provost; current president of the University of Texas Rio Grande Valley	
Rena Bizios	Lutcher Brown Chair and professor of biomedical engineering at UTSA	
Susan Budge	ceramic sculptor, full professor, and head of Ceramics	
Norma Elia Cantú	author and former professor of English at UTSA	
Henry Cisneros	local activist; former professor; president of Univision; US Secretary of Housing and Urban Development	
Larry Coker	former National Championship head coach of the University of Miami Hurricanes Football; first head coach of the UTSA football team	
Rudy Davalos	first athletic director at UTSA	
Taylor Eighmy	sixth university president of the University of Texas at San Antonio	
Mansour Omar El-Kikhia	Libyan activist, adviser, author, and former chairman of the Department of Political Science and Geography	
Kimberly Andrews Espy	provost and senior vice president for academic affairs (2018–2023)	
Peter T. Flawn	second university president of the University of Texas at San Antonio	
Steven G. Kellman	author and professor of English	
Samuel A. Kirkpatrick	fourth university president of the University of Texas at San Antonio	
Ken Little	artist and professor	
Bonnie Lyons	poet and literary critic	
Que McMaster	former track and field coach	
Mark Olberding	former NBA player and UTSA basketball coach	
Zorica Pantic-Tanner	former dean of the College of Engineering; currently the fourth president of Wentworth Institute of Technology	
George Perry	Alzheimer's disease researcher, dean and professor	
Darhyl S. Ramsey	author and former professor	
Ricardo Romo	fifth university president of the University of Texas at San Antonio	
Mario Marcel Salas	lecturer of Political Science and African American Studies; author; civil rights activist; former City of San Antonio Council member, 1997–2001	
Nikos Salingaros	mathematician and polymath known for his work on urban theory	
David J. Schneider	psychologist and former professor	
Nevil Shed	student program coordinator at the UTSA University Center; former NBA player; played for the 1966 Texas Western Miners, whose story was made into the movie Glory Road	
Heather Shipley	interim provost and senior vice president for academic affairs (2023-), inaugural holder of the Hispanic Thriving Institution Endowed Chair for the Dean of University College	
Ivy R. Taylor	public administration professor; former City of San Antonio Council member (2009–2014); former Mayor of San Antonio (2014–2017)	
Jon Taylor	professor of Political Science and chairman of the Department of Political Science and Geography	
Arleigh B. Templeton	first university president of the University of Texas at San Antonio	
Brooks Thompson	former NBA player; former UTSA head basketball coach	
Jeff Traylor	third UTSA football head coach in program history; Big 12 Recruiter of the Year; former associate head coach and running back coach for the Arkansas Razorbacks and SMU Mustangs	
Frank Wilson	former head coach of the UTSA football team; took UTSA to their first FBS bowl game	
Miguel José Yacamán	physicist; chair of the Physics Department at UTSA	
