= Özsoy (surname) =

Özsoy is a Turkish surname. Notable people with the surname include:

- Burcu Özsoy (born 1976), Turkish female antarctic scientist
- Fikret Özsoy, Turkish javelin thrower
- Hişyar Özsoy Turkish politician of Kurdish descent
- Neriman Özsoy, Turkish volleyball player
- Serkan Özsoy, Turkish footballer
- Seyit Halil Özsoy (1948–2025), Turkish politician
