= McMaster (surname) =

McMaster is a surname. Notable people with the surname include:

- Andrew Ross McMaster (1876–1937), Canadian politician
- A. T. McMaster (1918–2002), American politician
- Bill McMaster (1930–2025), Australian rules football coach and former player
- Bill McMaster (footballer, born 1922) (1922–2017), Australian rules footballer
- Bob McMaster (1921–2003), Australian rugby union and rugby league footballer, and wrestler
- Carolyn McMaster, Canadian film producer
- Cecil McMaster (1895–1981), South African Olympic athlete
- Drew McMaster (born 1959), retired Scottish sprinter
- Elizabeth McMaster (1847–1903), Canadian humanitarian
- Erasmus D. McMaster (1806–1866), American theologian
- Fergus McMaster (1879–1950), Australian businessman
- Gordon McMaster (1960–1997), Scottish politician
- Griffin McMaster (born 1983), Australian football (soccer) player
- H. R. McMaster (born 1962), United States Army officer and former National Security Advisor to Donald Trump
- Harold McMaster (1916–2003), inventor and entrepreneur in the glass industry
- Henry McMaster (born 1947), the current Governor of South Carolina
- I. D. McMaster (1923/24–2004), American assistant district attorney, and district judge for the 179th Criminal Court in Harris County, Texas (1972–1988)
- Jamie McMaster (born 1982), English-Australian football (soccer) player
- James McMaster 19th-century American Catholic newspaper editor
- John Bach McMaster (1852–1932), American historian
- Joseph McMaster (1861–1929), English cricketer with an extremely short career
- Kyron McMaster (born 1997), British Virgin Islands hurdler
- Lois McMaster Bujold (born 1949), American author
- Luke McMaster (born c. 1970s), American musician of McMaster & James
- Mary L. McMaster, American oncologist and clinical trialist
- Que McMaster, (born 1942), former collegiate track and field coach
- Rhyll McMaster (born 1947), contemporary Australian poet and novelist
- Rolland McMaster, American trade unionist
- Sam McMaster, the General Manager of the Los Angeles Kings (NHL) from 1994 to 1997
- Sherman McMaster (1853 – c. 1892), American outlaw and law-enforcement officer
- Stanley McMaster (1926–1992), Unionist politician and barrister in Northern Ireland
- Susan McMaster (born 1950), Canadian poet, literary editor, and spoken word performer
- Valentine Munbee McMaster (1834–1872), Irish war-time surgeon
- William McMaster (1811–1887), wholesaler, Senator and banker
- William McMaster (businessman) (1851–1930), industrial executive in Quebec
- William H. McMaster (1877–1968), the tenth Governor of South Dakota

== See also ==
- MacMaster (surname)
- McMasters (surname)
