= Shoesmith Glacier =

Glacier in Antarctica

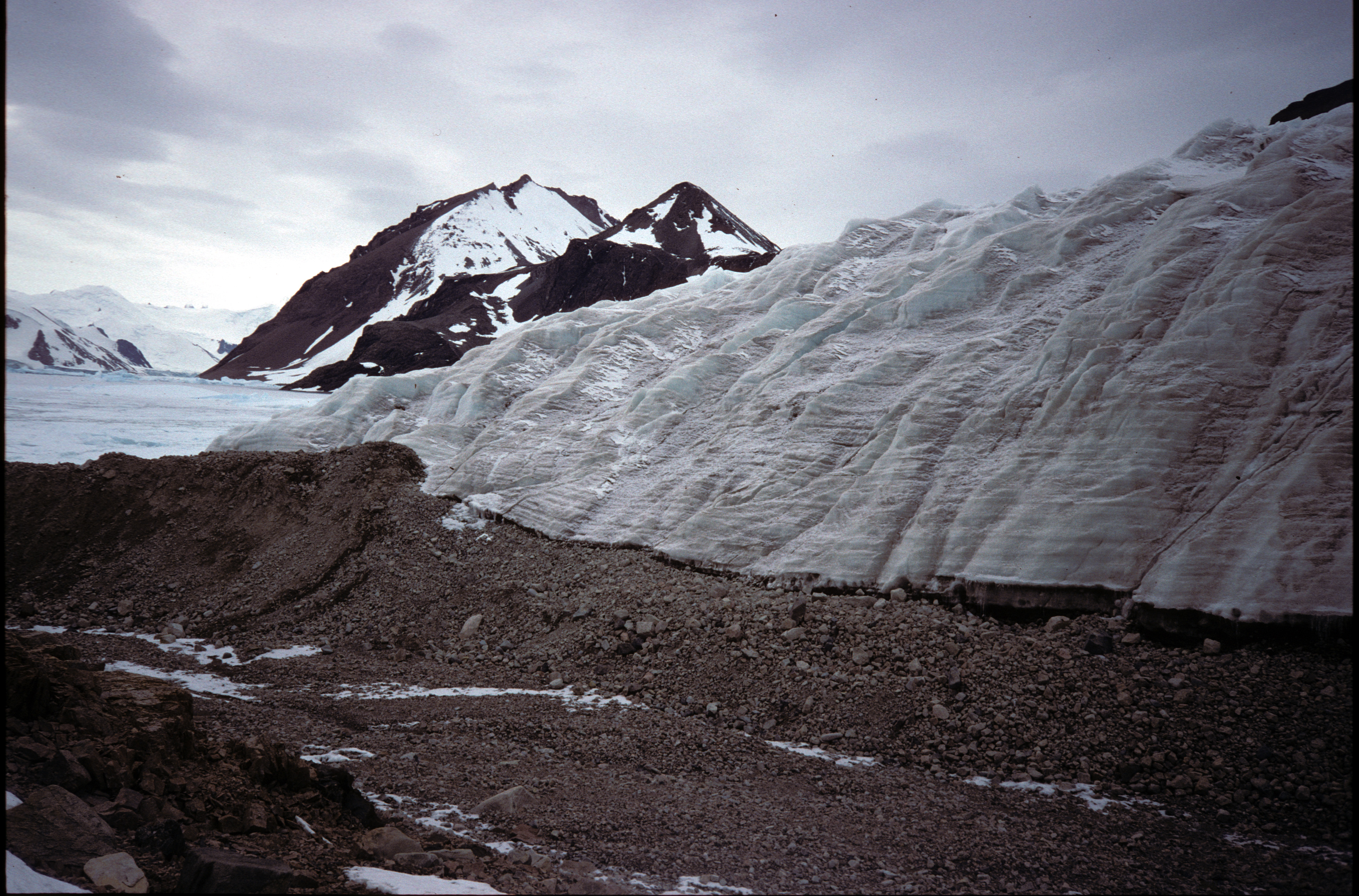
The decaying foot of Shoesmith Glacier

Shoesmith Glacier (67°51′S 67°12′W) is the largest glacier on Horseshoe Island, flowing westward into both Lystad Bay and Gaul Cove. Named by United Kingdom Antarctic Place-Names Committee (UK-APC) in 1958 in association with Horseshoe Island.

Bordering the north side of the glacier is the Spincloud Heights.

== See also ==
- Trifid Peak
