= Mount Searle =

Mountain in Graham Land, Antarctica

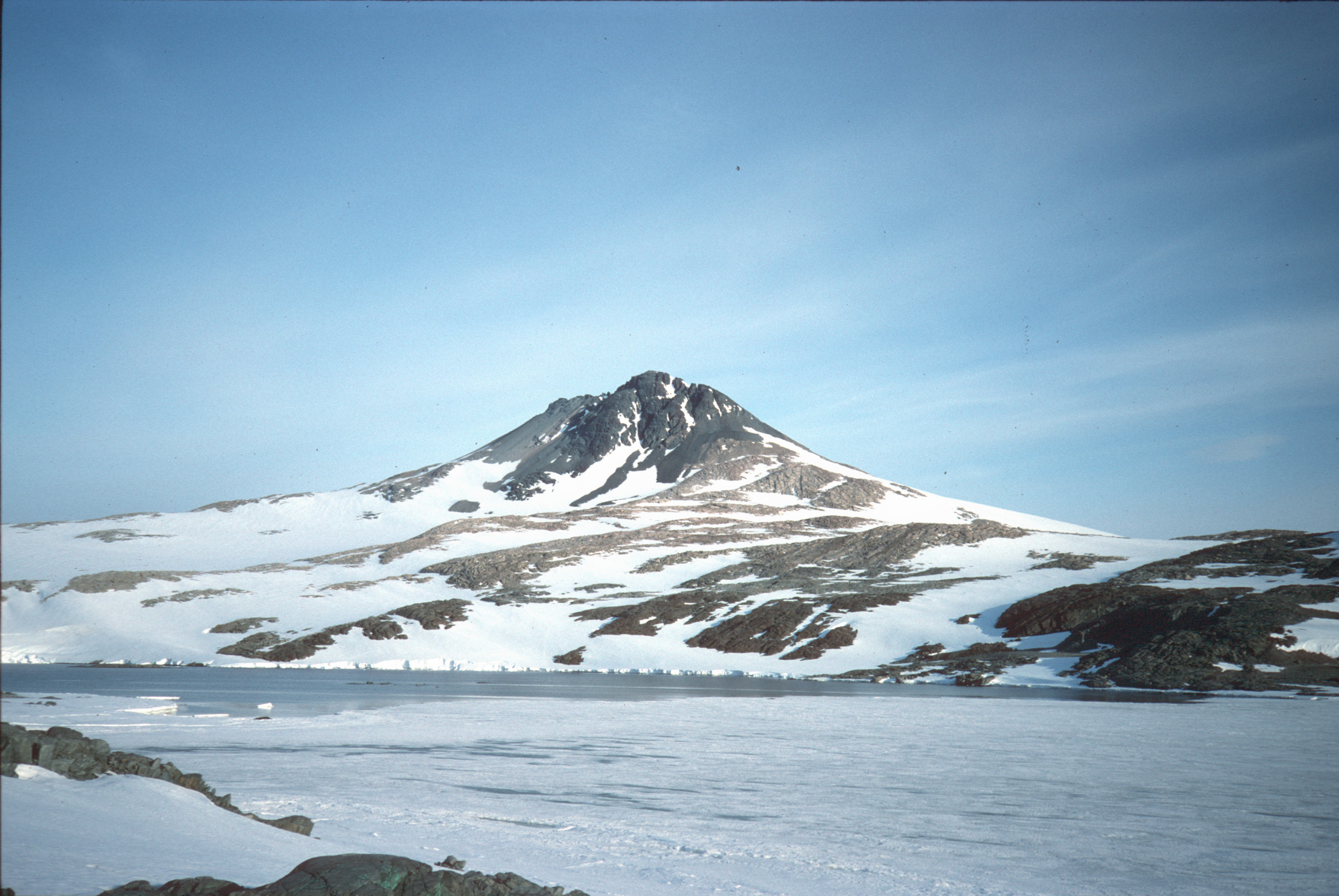
Mount Searle with Sally Cove

Mount Searle (67°49′S 67°15′W) is a peak between Sally and Gaul Coves on Horseshoe Island. Named for Derek J.H. Searle of Falkland Islands Dependencies Survey (FIDS), surveyor at Horseshoe Island in 1955 and 1956, who surveyed this feature.
