= Gibbs Point =

Coordinates: 67°48′22″S 67°09′38″W

Gibbs Point, a rock point on the Antarctic Peninsula, the most northern area of the continent of Antarctica, was named for African American Antarctic explorer, George W. Gibbs, Jr. on September 2, 2009. On that date, the Advisory Committee on Antarctic Names (U.S. Board on Geographic Names) confirmed the place name in Antarctica for Gibbs as the first black explorer to set foot on the continent. Gibbs Point is a rock point forming the northwest entrance to Gaul Cove, on the northeast of Horseshoe Island, Marguerite Bay, Antarctic Peninsula.
