= Trifid Peak =

Mountain in Antarctica

Trifid Peak (67°51′S 67°9′W) is a peak at the head of Shoesmith Glacier in western Horseshoe Island. Named by United Kingdom Antarctic Place-Names Committee (UK-APC) in 1958. The name is descriptive of this three-sided matterhorn-type peak.
