= George W. Gibbs Jr. =

United States Navy First African-American in Antarctica (1916–2000)

- Born: George Washington Gibbs Jr. 7 November 1916; Jacksonville, Florida
- Died: 7 November 2000 (aged 84); Rochester, Minnesota
- Burial place: Rochester, Minnesota
- Military career
- Allegiance: United States
- Branch: United States Navy
- Service years: 1935-1959
- Rank: Chief Petty Officer
- Conflicts: World War II
- Awards: United States Antarctic Expedition Medal
- Other work: IBM personnel department Employment agency owner NAACP chapter president

George Washington Gibbs Jr. (November 7, 1916 – November 7, 2000), a sailor in the United States Navy, became the first African-American to set foot on the continent of Antarctica on the Antarctic Peninsula. Gibbs served as a member of Rear Admiral Richard E. Byrd's third Antarctic expedition, also known as the United States Antarctic Service Expedition (1939–1941) on January 14, 1940. Gibbs served as a gunner in the U.S. Navy during World War II. After 24 years service in the U.S. Navy, Gibbs retired in 1959 as a chief petty officer. Gibbs then attended the University of Minnesota, graduating with a Bachelor of Science degree in Education. Gibbs worked in the personnel department of IBM at Rochester, Minnesota from 1963 to 1982. After retiring from IBM, Gibbs founded an employment agency, Technical Career Placement, Inc., which he continued to operate until 1999.

George Gibbs was a civil rights leader who integrated the Elks Club at Rochester and several service clubs. In 1966, Gibbs helped organize the Rochester Chapter of the National Association for the Advancement of Colored People (NAACP). He was also a civic leader who was president of the Rochester Kiwanis and the Rochester chapter of the University of Minnesota Alumni Association and was involved in several charitable organizations.

Gibbs Point on the Antarctic Peninsula was named for George W. Gibbs Jr. on September 2, 2009.

The Rochester, Minnesota school board named a new elementary school, dedicated on October 11, 2009, the George W. Gibbs Jr. Elementary School.

== Early life ==
George W. Gibbs Jr. was born in Jacksonville, Florida on November 7, 1916. He moved to Brooklyn, New York. He attended Brooklyn Technical High School. Gibbs later received his General Education Diploma (GED).

After brief work in the Civilian Conservation Corps, Gibbs enlisted in the U.S. Navy from Macon, Georgia in 1935. He re-enlisted when his four-year period of enlistment expired.

During his time in the Navy, Gibbs married Joyce Powell on September 26, 1953, in Portsmouth, Virginia. The Gibbs's had a daughter, Leilani R. (Gibbs) Henry and a son, E. Anthony "Tony."

== U.S. Navy ==
=== Polar expedition ===
Gibbs was encouraged to apply for an assignment with the United States Antarctic Service. The U.S. Congress established the service to support Rear Admiral Richard E. Byrd's third polar expedition (1939–1941) intended "to consolidate previous American exploration and to examine more closely the land in the Pacific sector." Gibbs was among forty U.S. Navy men chosen from 2,000 Navy applicants for a job with the expedition. Gibbs served as a Mess Attendant 1st Class aboard the lead expedition ship, U.S.S. Bear, but also worked as a cook and performed other tasks with the expedition. By the end of the expedition, Gibbs was an Officer's Cook 3rd Class.

Despite the long work days, Gibbs kept a journal during the expedition. It had been misplaced behind a dresser and only was found by his wife soon after his death in 2000. Gibbs noted the unfriendly attitude of two of the officers on the U.S.S. Bear but praised the captain and the spirit of co-operation among most of the Navy and civilian members of the expedition.

On January 14, 1940, the U.S.S. Bear anchored in the Bay of Whales. Gibbs wrote in his journal:

I was the first man aboard the ship to set foot in Little America and help tie her lines deep into the snow. I met Admiral Byrd; he shook my hand and welcomed me to Little America and for being the first Negro to set foot in Little America.

Gibbs helped to establish West Base (Little America III), near the Bay of Whales, and East Base on Stonington Island, Marguerite Bay, Antarctic Peninsula. He twice made round trips between the United States and Antarctica.

During the expedition, Gibbs helped catch Adelie penguins for the Smithsonian Institution. This was dangerous work because the men had to work from a rowboat in fog with a non-working radio. Only the sounding of the ship's horn gave the men bearings to find their way back to the ship.

The captain of the Bear, Lieutenant Commander Richard H. Cruzen, commended Gibbs twice: first, "at meritorious mast for his zeal, initiative, and untiring industry, entailing much personal sacrifice," during the preparation period for the Antarctic duty and second, at the end of the expedition, "for his outstanding zeal and energy, and for the unusual spirit of loyalty and cooperation which he has invariably displayed under trying conditions encountered during the assignment of this vessel to duty with the U.S. Antarctic Service."

=== World War II ===
During World War II, Gibbs served in combat in the Pacific. He was a gunner on the U.S.S. Atlanta. During the Naval Battle of Guadalcanal on November 13, 1942, the Atlanta was sunk by enemy fire from the Japanese battleship Hiei and a torpedo from the Japanese destroyer Akatsuki, killing about a third of the 3,000 member crew. After a night in shark-infested waters, Gibbs and the other survivors were rescued.

=== Post-war ===
Gibbs remained in the U.S. Navy until 1959 when he retired as a chief petty officer. Among other awards, Gibbs received the Navy Good Conduct Medal, the Asiatic-Pacific Campaign Medal, World War II Victory Medal, National Defense Service Medal and the silver United States Antarctic Expedition Medal.

== Later career ==
After Gibbs retired from the Navy, he moved to Minneapolis, graduating from the University of Minnesota in 1963 with the degree of Bachelor of Science in Education. The Gibbs family then moved to Rochester, Minnesota, where Gibbs worked in the personnel department at IBM for 18 years. He also was housing administrator and international assignment representative for IBM. Gibbs then founded his own employment company, Technical Career Placement, Inc., which he operated until 1999.

== Civil rights and civic leadership ==
Gibbs became a civil rights leader and helped organize the Rochester, Minnesota Chapter of the National Association for the Advancement of Colored People (NAACP). He worked for civil rights in Rochester and on a national basis. Later, the Rochester, Minnesota branch of the NAACP presented Gibbs with the George Gibbs Humanitarianism Award. Gibbs's daughter, who plans to publish a book about her father, has said that he was very persuasive, noting that only about 50 of the 350 members of the local NAACP chapter were black. Gibbs also worked with the Minnesota-North Dakota NAACP Conference.

Gibbs was president of the Rochester Kiwanis and the Rochester chapter of the University of Minnesota Alumni Association. Gibbs was a chairman of Boy Scout Troop 21 and the United Negro College Fund for southeast Minnesota. He was a member of Christ United Methodist Church.

In 1974, Gibbs was denied membership in the Rochester Elks Club, which made headlines and eventually led to breaking the color barrier at that club, an accomplishment also made by Gibbs at service clubs in Rochester.

George W. Gibbs Jr. died on his 84th birthday, November 7, 2000.

== Memorials ==
=== Gibbs Point ===
Gibbs Point, a rock point on the Antarctic Peninsula, the most northern area of Antarctica, was named for African-American Antarctic explorer George W. Gibbs Jr. on September 2, 2009. On that date, the Advisory Committee on Antarctic Names (U.S. Board on Geographic Names) confirmed the place name in Antarctica for Gibbs as the first black explorer to set foot on the continent. Gibbs Point is a rock point forming the northwest entrance to Gaul Cove, on the northeast of Horseshoe Island, Marguerite Bay, Antarctic Peninsula (67°48'22"S, 067°09'38"W).

=== Others ===
Rochester Minnesota's West Soldiers Field Drive was renamed in honor of Gibbs in 2002.

On August 5, 2008, the Rochester, Minnesota school board named a new elementary school the George W. Gibbs Jr. Elementary School. The formal dedication was October 11, 2009. A scholarship also was named for Gibbs.

== See also ==
- United States Antarctic Service Expedition
