= 2019 Wuhan Zall F.C. season =

Wuhan Zall
2019 season
- Chairman: Yan Zhi
- Manager: José Manuel González López
- Stadium: Dongxihu Sports Center
- Super League: 6th
- FA Cup: Fourth round
- Top goalscorer: League: Jean Kouassi (12 goals); All: Jean Kouassi (12 goals)

The 2019 Wuhan Zall F.C. season was Wuhan Zall's first season in the Chinese Super League since it started in the 2004 season, and their first season in the top flight of Chinese football. During this season, Wuhan Zall participated in the Chinese Super League and Chinese FA Cup.

== Squad statistics ==
=== Appearances and goals ===
As of match played unknown

No.	Pos	Nat	Player	Total		Super League		FA Cup	
No.	Pos	Nat	Player	Apps	Goals	Apps	Goals	Apps	Goals
				0	0	0	0	0	0
Players transferred out during the season

=== Disciplinary record ===
As of match played unknown

No.	Pos	Nat	Player	Super League			FA Cup			Total		
No.	Pos	Nat	Player	Yellow card	Second yellow card	Red card	Yellow card	Second yellow card	Red card	Yellow card	Second yellow card	Red card
				0	0	0	0	0	0	0	0	0
Total				0	0	0	0	0	0	0	0	0

== Competitions ==
=== Chinese Super League ===
==== Table ====
Pos	Team	Pld	W	D	L	GF	GA	GD	Pts
4	Jiangsu Suning	30	15	8	7	60	41	+19	53
5	Shandong Luneng Taishan	30	15	6	9	55	35	+20	51
6	Wuhan Zall	30	12	8	10	41	41	0	44
7	Tianjin TEDA	30	12	5	13	43	45	−2	41 (Note: Head-to-head results: Henan Jianye 2–3 Tianjin TEDA, Tianjin TEDA 2–0 Henan Jianye.)
8	Henan Jianye	30	11	8	11	41	46	−5	41

Source: CSL
Rules for classification:
- During season: 1) Points; 2) Goal difference; 3) Goals scored.
- After season: 1) Points; 2) Head-to-head points; 3) Head-to-head goal difference; 4) Head-to-head goals scored; 5) Scores of the weight ratio of the reserve league and youth leagues.
  Notes:

==== Results summary ====
Overall								Home						Away					
Pld	W	D	L	GF	GA	GD	Pts	W	D	L	GF	GA	GD	W	D	L	GF	GA	GD
30	12	8	10	41	41	0	44	6	5	4	19	16	+3	6	3	6	22	25	−3

Source: League table

==== Results by round ====
Round	1	2	3	4	5	6	7	8	9	10	11	12	13	14	15	16	17	18	19	20	21	22	23	24	25	26	27	28	29	30
Ground	H	H	A	A	H	A	H	A	H	H	H	H	A	H	A	A	A	H	A	H	A	A	H	H	A	A	A	H	A	H
Result	L	W	L	L	D	L	D	W	L	W	W	D	W	L	W	L	W	D	D	D	D	L	W	W	W	L	D	W	W	L
Position	13	7	9	13	12	16	14	12	13	11	9	8	6	8	7	9	5	6	7	7	7	9	6	6	6	6	6	6	6	6

First match(es) will be played on 1 March 2019. Source: Competitive matches
A = Away; H = Home; W = Win; D = Draw; L = Loss

==== Matches ====
All times are local (UTC+8).

1 March 2019 1	Wuhan Zall	0–1	Beijing Sinobo Guoan	Wuhan
20:00			Augusto 66'	Stadium: Dongxihu Sports Center; Attendance: 24,718; Referee: Wang Jing

9 March 2019 2	Wuhan Zall	1–0	Beijing Renhe	Wuhan
19:35 UTC+8	Pengfei 62'			Stadium: Dongxihu Sports Center; Attendance: 21,920; Referee: Haixin Li

31 March 2019 3	Jiangsu Suning	2–1	Wuhan Zall	Jiangsu
19:35	Wang 25'; Xi 70'		Rafael 76'	Stadium: Nanjing Olympic Sports Centre; Attendance: 31,889; Referee: Shi Zhenlu

5 April 2019 4	Beijing Sinobo Guoan	–	Jiangsu Suning	Beijing
19:35 UTC+8				Stadium: Workers' Stadium

14 April 2019 5	Beijing Sinobo Guoan	–	Henan Jianye	Beijing
19:35 UTC+8				Stadium: Workers' Stadium

20 April 2019 6	Hebei China Fortune	–	Beijing Sinobo Guoan	Langfang
19:35 UTC+8				Stadium: Langfang Stadium

28 April 2019 7	Beijing Sinobo Guoan	–	Dalian Yifang	Beijing
19:35 UTC+8				Stadium: Workers' Stadium

4 May 2019 8	Guangzhou Evergrande Taobao	–	Beijing Sinobo Guoan	Guangzhou
19:35 UTC+8				Stadium: Tianhe Stadium

12 May 2019 9	Beijing Sinobo Guoan	–	Shenzhen F.C.	Beijing
19:35 UTC+8				Stadium: Workers' Stadium

17 May 2019 10	Beijing Sinobo Guoan	–	Tianjin Tianhai	Beijing
19:35 UTC+8				Stadium: Workers' Stadium

26 May 2019 11	Shanghai SIPG	–	Beijing Sinobo Guoan	Shanghai
19:35 UTC+8				Stadium: Shanghai Stadium

2 June 2019 12	Tianjin Teda	–	Beijing Sinobo Guoan	Tianjin
19:35 UTC+8				Stadium: Tianjin Olympic Center Stadium

14 June 2019 13	Beijing Sinobo Guoan	–	Shanghai Greenland Shenhua	Beijing
18:00 UTC+8				Stadium: Workers' Stadium

22 June 2019 14	Beijing Sinobo Guoan	–	Guangzhou R&F	Beijing
17:30 UTC+8				Stadium: Workers' Stadium

30 June 2019 15	Shandong Luneng Taishan	–	Beijing Sinobo Guoan	Jinan
19:35 UTC+8				Stadium: Jinan Olympic Sports Center Stadium

6 July 2019 16	Beijing Sinobo Guoan	–	Wuhan Zall	Beijing
19:35 UTC+8				Stadium: Workers' Stadium
