= Track and field at the Military World Games =

Track and field is one of the sports at the quadrennial Military World Games competition. Track and field competitions have been held at every one of the eleven editions of the Military World Games, which was inaugurated in 1995.

== Editions ==
Games	Year	Host city	Host country	Events
I	1995	Rome	Italy	30
II	1999	Zagreb	Croatia	32
III	2003	Catania	Italy	35
IV	2007	Hyderabad	India	36
V	2011	Rio de Janeiro	Brazil	35
VI	2015	Mungyeong	South Korea	40
VII	2019	Wuhan	China	

== Games records ==
=== Men ===
Event	Record	Athlete	Nationality	Date	Games	Place	Ref.
100 m	10.07 (+0.2 m/s)	Femi Seun Ogunode	Qatar	21 July 2011	2011 Games	Rio de Janeiro, Brazil	
200 m	20.31 (+0.1 m/s)	Aldemir da Silva Júnior	Brazil	24 October 2019	2019 Games	Wuhan, China	
400 m	45.18	Yousef Masrahi	Saudi Arabia	6 October 2015	2015 Games	Mungyeong, South Korea	
800 m	1:45.50	Ali Al-Deraan	Saudi Arabia	6 October 2015	2015 Games	Mungyeong, South Korea	
1500 m							
5000 m	13:06.17	Mark Kiptoo	Kenya	23 July 2011	2011 Games	Rio de Janeiro, Brazil	
10,000 m	27:41.76	El Hassan El-Abbassi	Bahrain	5 October 2015	2015 Games	Mungyeong, South Korea	
Marathon	2:08:28	Shumi Dechasa	Bahrain	27 October 2019	2019 Games	Wuhan, China	
110 m hurdles	13.32	Staņislavs Olijars	Latvia	August 1999	1999 Games	Zagreb, Croatia	
400 m hurdles	48.75	Thomas Goller	Germany	August 1999	1999 Games	Zagreb, Croatia	
3000 m steeplechase	8:14.13	Saad Al-Asmari	Saudi Arabia	September 1995	1995 Games	Roma, Italy	
High jump	2.31 m	Majededdin Ghazal	Syria	5 October 2015	2015 Games	Mungyeong, South Korea	
Pole vault	5.81 m	Pawel Wojciechowski	Poland	23 July 2011	2011 Games	Rio de Janeiro, Brazil	
Long jump							
Triple jump	16.93 m	Mykola Savolaynen	Ukraine	October 2007	2007 Games	Hyderabad, India	
Shot put	22.36 m	Darlan Romani	Brazil	22 October 2019	2019 Games	Wuhan, China	
Discus throw	65.97 m	Piotr Małachowski	Poland	October 2007	2007 Games	Hyderabad, India	
Hammer throw	79.76 m	Andriy Skvaruk	Ukraine	August 1999	1999 Games	Zagreb, Croatia	
Javelin throw							
10,000 m walk (track)	39:29.45	Alessandro Gandellini	Italy	December 2003	2003 Games	Catania, Italy	
20 km walk (road)	1:21:42	Aigars Fadejevs	Latvia	August 1999	1999 Games	Zagreb, Croatia	
50 km walk (road)	3:51:56	Wang Qin	China	25 October 2019	2019 Games	Wuhan, China	
4 × 100 m relay	38.68	Rodrigo do Nascimento; Aldemir da Silva Júnior; Derick Silva; Paulo André de Oliveira	Brazil	24 October 2019	2019 Games	Wuhan, China	
4 × 400 m relay	3:02.78	Marcin Jędrusiński; Piotr Rysiukiewicz; Jacek Bocian; Robert Maćkowiak	Poland	August 1999	1999 Games	Zagreb, Croatia	

=== Women ===
Event	Record	Athlete	Nationality	Date	Meet	Games	Ref.
100 m	11.17 (+1.6 m/s)	Rosângela Santos	Brazil	6 October 2015	2015 Games	Mungyeong, South Korea	
200 m	23.01 (−0.4 m/s)	Ana Cláudia Silva	Brazil	23 July 2011	2011 Games	Rio de Janeiro, Brazil	
400 m	50.15	Salwa Eid Naser	Bahrain	22 October 2019	2019 Games	Wuhan, China	
800 m	1:59.99	Nataliia Lupu	Ukraine	5 October 2015	2015 Games	Mungyeong, South Korea	
1500 m	4:07.34	Helena Javornik	Slovenia	August 1999	1999 Games	Zagreb, Croatia	
5000 m	15:10.69	Mihaela Botezan	Romania	December 2003	2003 Games	Catania, Italy	
10,000 m							
Marathon							
100 m hurdles	12.95 (+0.3 m/s)	Alina Talay	Belarus	22 July 2011	2011 Games	Rio de Janeiro, Brazil	
400 m hurdles	55.12	Aminat Yusuf Jamal	Bahrain	24 October 2019	2019 Games	Wuhan, China	
3000 m steeplechase	9:19.24	Winfred Yavi	Bahrain	22 October 2019	2019 Games	Wuhan, China	
High jump	2.01 m	Mariya Lasitskene	Russia	23 October 2019	2019 Games	Wuhan, China	
Long jump	6.71 m	Olga Rublyova	Russia	September 1995	1995 Games	Roma, Italy	
Triple jump	14.28 m (+1.0 m/s)	Ekaterina Koneva	Russia	6 October 2015	2015 Games	Mungyeong, South Korea	
Shot put							
Discus throw	64.83 m	Feng Bin	China	24 October 2019	2019 Games	Wuhan, China	
Hammer throw	74.87 m	Zhang Wenxiu	China	7 October 2015	2015 Games	Mungyeong, South Korea	
Javelin throw	63.06 m	Zhang Li	China	25 October 2019	2019 Games	Wuhan, China	
5000 m walk (track)	22:11.69	Yelena Nikolayeva	Russia	December 2003	2003 Games	Catania, Italy	
20 km walk (road)	1:30:03	Yang Jiayu	China	25 October 2019	2019 Games	Wuhan, China	
4 × 100 m relay	43.29	Bruna Farias; Vitória Cristina Rosa; Lorraine Martins; Rosângela Santos	Brazil	24 October 2019	2019 Games	Wuhan, China	
4 × 400 m relay	3:27.84	Anna Kiełbasińska; Małgorzata Hołub-Kowalik; Joanna Linkiewicz; Justyna Święty-Ersetic	Poland	26 October 2019	2019 Games	Wuhan, China	

== See also ==
- International athletics championships and games
