= Turkish Antarctic Research Station =

Coordinates: 67°49′46″S 67°14′13″W

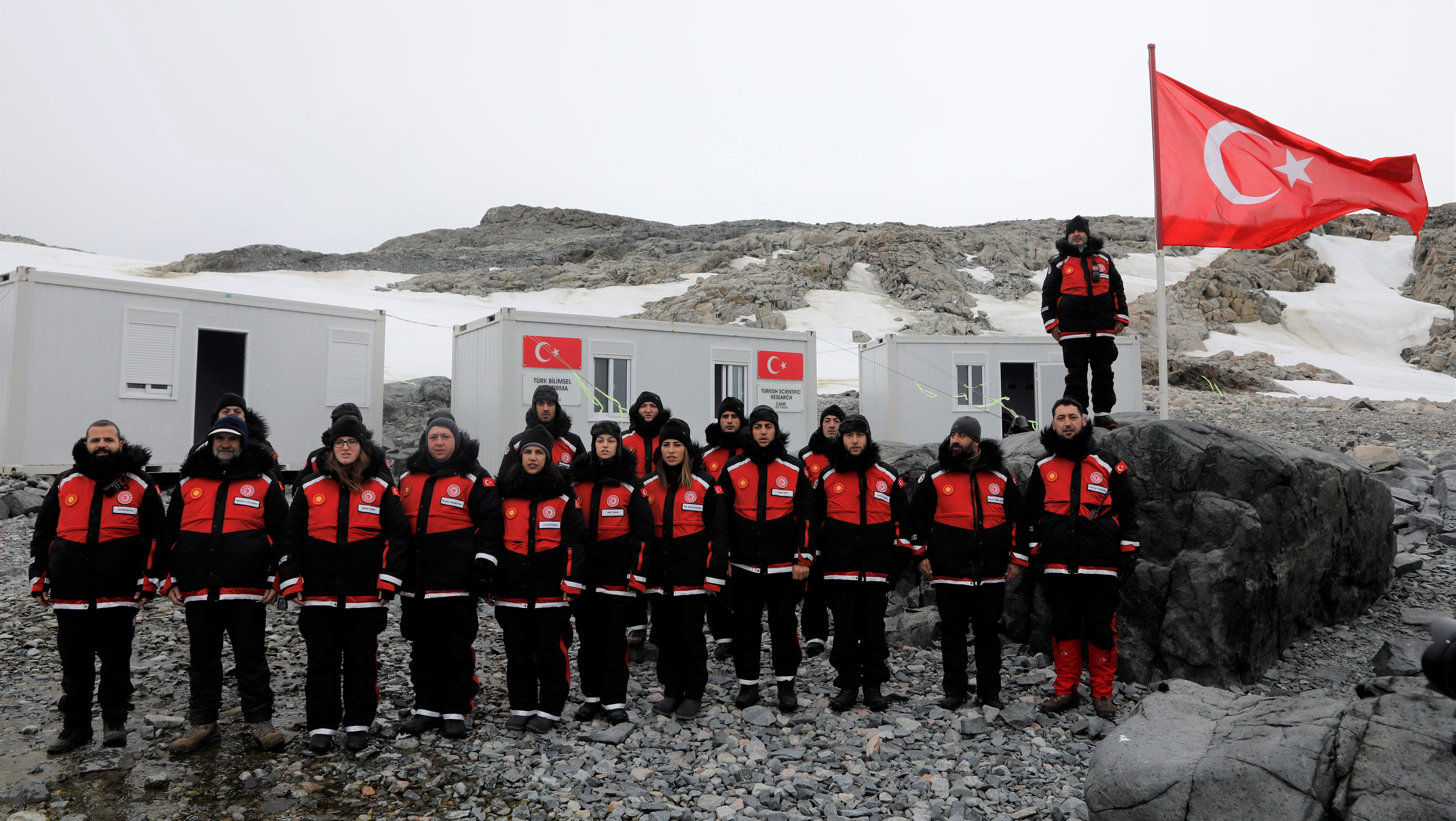
Turkish Antarctic Research Station

Turkish Antarctic Research Station (Turkish: Türk Antarktika Araştırma İstasyonu) or TARS is a research station in Antarctica.

Turkey has announced Horseshoe Island as the chosen location to install its first research base in Antarctica. Having a recent research program - the Turkish Polar Research Program - started in 2017, it has opened temporary facilities on the island in 2018, including a weather monitoring station and a camp. The plan is to build a permanent base for around 50 people, initially operating only during the summer, and later throughout the whole year.

The station will be built in two stages using mostly pre-fabricated modules, it will be powered by renewable energy sources, and materials suitable for reuse, recycling, and recovery will be preferred. The Turkish Polar Research Program aims to ensure the sustainability of scientific activities on polar regions and prioritizes four scientific disciplines: physical sciences, geosciences, life sciences, and social sciences and humanities. The next version of the program will aim to conduct studies on climate and related systems, long-term observations, marine resources, environmental and ecosystem observations, scientific and technological innovations, and humanities in polar regions.

== See also ==
- https://kare.mam.tubitak.gov.tr/en - Official website of TUBITAK Polar Research Institute
- https://kare.mam.tubitak.gov.tr/en/about-pri/institutional-overview - Background
- ITU PolReC
- http://www.polarresearch.center/en/ - Official website of ITU PolReC
