= MacMaster =

MacMaster can refer to:

- MacMaster (surname)
- MacMasters Beach, New South Wales, Australian beach
- William and Annie MacMaster House

== See also ==
- McMaster (disambiguation)
