= Derek and Petra Searle =

British geographer couple

Petra Leay Searle
- Born: 2 December 1928; Exeter, Devon
- Citizenship: British

Derek John Hatherall Searle (born Hinxton, Cambridgeshire, 1928 – 12 September 2003, Norwich) and Petra Leay Searle (born Exeter, Devon, 2 December 1928) are a British couple known for surveying British Overseas Territories and Antarctica in the mid-20th Century. Derek, a photographer and map librarian worked on the Falkland Islands and Dependencies Aerial Survey Expedition, and Petra worked for Ordnance Survey International, mapping South Georgia.

The Leay Glacier off the coast of Graham Land, Antarctica is named after Petra. Mount Searle on Antarctica's Horseshoe Island is named after Derek.
