= Track and field at the 2003 Military World Games =

Track and field at the III World Military Games
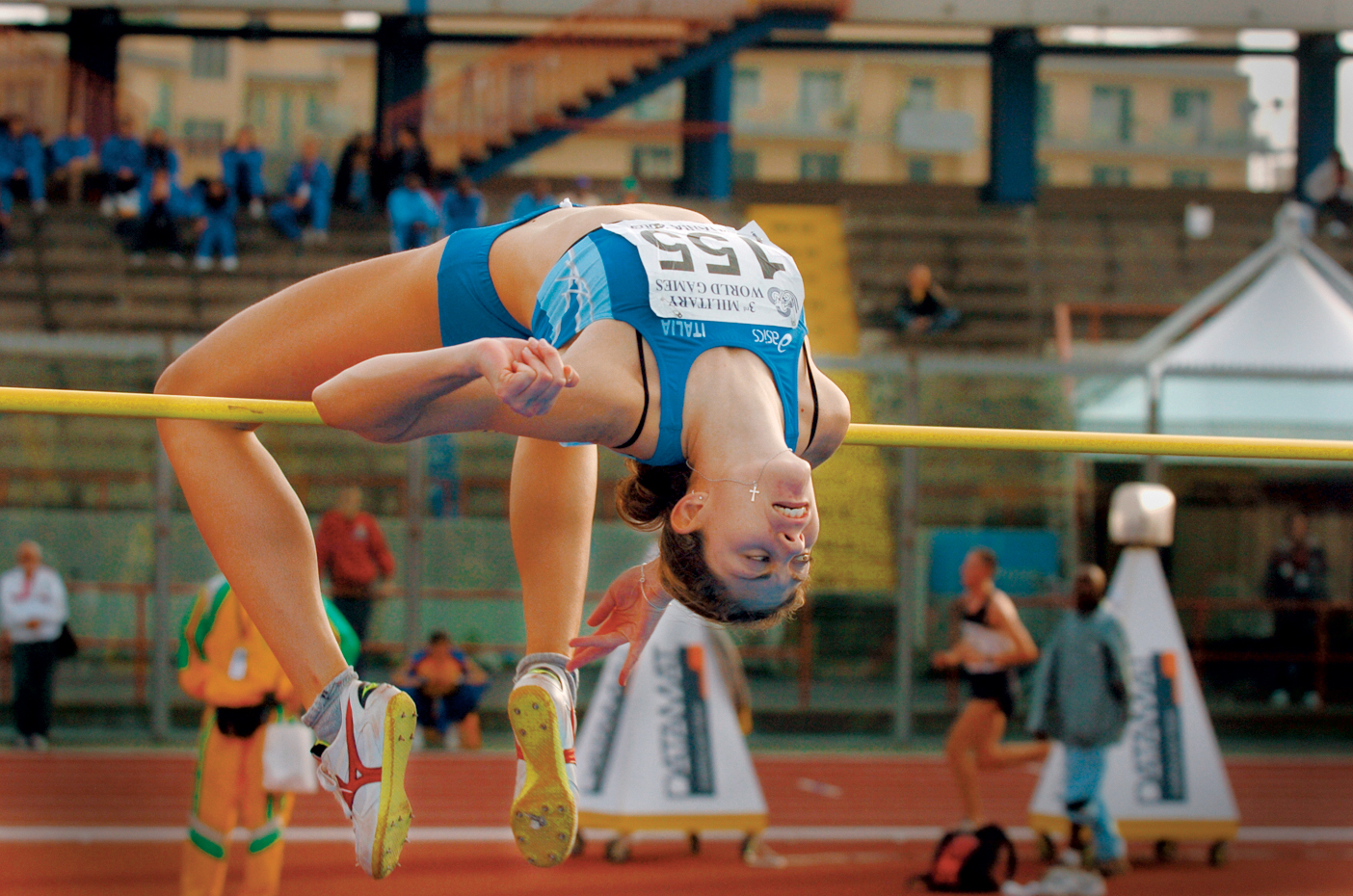
- The high jump competition at the 2003 Games
- Dates: 6 – 8 December 2003
- Host city: Catania, Italy
- Venue: Stadio Angelo Massimino
- Level: Military personnel
- Events: 36
- Records set: 6 Games records

At the 2003 Military World Games, the track and field events were held at the Stadio Angelo Massimino in Catania, Italy, from 6 – 8 December 2003. The marathon races were held outside of the stadium, taking place in neighbouring Palermo. A total of 35 events were contested, of which 22 by male and 13 by female athletes.

Russia topped the medal table with nine golds and 23 medals in total – more than double their nearest competitor. The hosts Italy took second place on the medal table with four golds and nine medals in total. Kenya was the next most successful nation, having won four golds in men's track events, although they also secured a silver in the men's 4×100 metres relay – an event the country is historically weak at.

Compared to previous editions, several changes were made to the events programme: the men's 20 m road walk was replaced with a 10,000 m track walk, while the women's programme saw the addition of the 400 metres hurdles, triple jump, hammer throw and 5000 m track walk. The women's shot put contest was dropped for this addition. Wind and downpours of rain affected much of the competition, with Ryan Kirkpatrick of the United States remarking that "the conditions are just above miserable". As a result, performances were below usual standards and although seven new Games records were set, five of these were in newly introduced events. Mihaela Botezan of Romania was the only Games record-breaker at the Angelo Massimino stadium, completing the 5000 metres in 15:10.69, while the other Games record was broken by Francesco Ingargiola in the men's marathon in Palermo.

== Records ==
Name	Event	Country	Record	Type
Francesco Ingargiola	Marathon	Italy	2:14:51	GR
Alessandro Gandellini	10000 m track walk	Italy	39:29:45	GR
Mihaela Botezan	5000 m	Romania	15:10.69	GR
Irêna Žauna	400 m hurdles	Latvia	57.35	GR
Cristina Nicolau	Triple jump	Romania	13.45 m	GR
Zhang Wenxiu	Hammer throw	China	69.89 m	GR
Yelena Nikolayeva	5000 m track walk	Russia	22:11.69	GR
Key:WR — World record • AR — Area record • GR — Games record • NR — National record

== Medal summary ==
=== Men ===
Event	Gold		Silver		Bronze	
100 metres (wind: −1.8 m/s)	Bruno Pacheco (BRA)	10.53	Rodrigo de Araújo (BRA)	10.57	Salem Mubarak Al-Yami (KSA)	10.58
200 metres	Evgenios Papadopoulos (GRE)	21.76	Bruno Pacheco (BRA)	21.77	Roman Smirnov (RUS)	21.77
400 metres	Vincent Mumo Kiilu (KEN)	46.39	Matija Šestak (SLO)	46.88	Johnson Kubisa (BOT)	46.98
800 metres	Joseph Mutua (KEN)	1:48.84	Rashid Mohammed (BHR)	1:49.28	Michael Rotich (KEN)	1:49.70
1500 metres	Abdelkader Hachlaf (MAR)	3:55.12	Fabio Lettieri (ITA)	3:55.66	Tarek Boukensa (ALG)	3:56.47
5000 metres	Sammy Kipketer (KEN)	13:59.30	Benjamin Limo (KEN)	13:59.43	Günther Weidlinger (AUT)	14:00.83
10,000 metres	John Cheruiyot Korir (KEN)	28:38.93	Dieudonné Disi (RWA)	28:49.63	Francesco Bennici (ITA)	28:50.20
110 metres hurdles	Artur Kohutek (POL)	14.12	Mubarak Ata Mubarak (KSA)	14.16	Alexandru Mihailescu (ROM)	14.30
400 metres hurdles	Ibrahim Al-Hamaidi (KSA)	51.44	Sanderson dos Santos (BRA)	51.62	Panayotis Andriopoulos (GRE)	52.03
3000 metres steeplechase	Abel Yagout Jawher (BHR)	8:42.97	Jan Zakrzewski (POL)	8:43.85	Abraham Cherono (KEN)	8:45.36
4×100 metres relay	Italy (ITA); Alessandro Vecchi; Gianluca Capati; Stefano Bellotto; Maurizio Chechucci	41.07	Kenya (KEN); Levi Wasike; Victor Kibet; Vincent Mumo Kiilu; Stanley Towett	41.33	Saudi Arabia (KSA); Y. Habib; Mubarak Ata Mubarak; Salem Mubarak Al-Yami; Hamdan Odha Al-Bishi	41.53
4×400 metres relay	Poland (POL); Marcin Marciniszyn; Jacek Bocian; Piotr Rysiukiewicz; Robert Maćkowiak	3:11.24	Kenya (KEN); Joseph Mutua; Victor Kibet; M. Rotich; Vincent Mumo Kiilu	3:11.47	Colombia (COL); Jhon Chávez; Wenceslao Ferrín; J. Moreno; Julio César Rojas	3:13.05
Marathon	Francesco Ingargiola (ITA)	2:14:51 GR	Lim Jin-Soo (KOR)	2:17:10	Jumah Omar Al-Noor (QAT)	2:17:22
10,000 m track walk	Alessandro Gandellini (ITA)	39:29.45 GR	Ilya Markov (RUS)	39:33.16	Ivan Trotskiy (BLR)	39:34.99
High jump	Yuriy Krymarenko (UKR)	2.18 m	Pyotr Brayko (RUS)	2.15 m	Kyriakos Ioannou (CYP)	2.15 m
Pole vault	Igor Pavlov (RUS)	5.45 m	Pavel Gerasimov (RUS)	5.30 m	Artyom Kuptsov (RUS)	5.15 m
Long jump	Ruslan Gataullin (RUS)	7.81 m	Hussein Taher Al-Sabee (KSA)	7.80 m	Kirill Sosunov (RUS)	7.77 m
Triple jump	Aleksandr Sergeyev (RUS)	16.23 m	Hussein Taher Al-Sabee (KSA)	15.98 m	Fabrizio Schembri (ITA)	15.69 m
Shot put	Milan Haborák (SVK)	19.55 m	Roman Virastyuk (UKR)	19.30 m	Leszek Śliwa (POL)	18.86 m
Discus throw	Diego Fortuna (ITA)	60.16 m	Aleksandr Borichevskiy (RUS)	59.14 m	Jo Van Daele (BEL)	58.59 m
Hammer throw	Miloslav Konopka (SVK)	75.59 m	Vladislav Piskunov (UKR)	74.88 m	Ilya Konovalov (RUS)	72.86 m
Javelin throw	Aleksandr Ivanov (RUS)	78.13 m	Vadims Vasilevskis (LAT)	77.81 m	Tero Järvenpää (FIN)	74.32 m

=== Women ===
Event	Gold		Silver		Bronze	
100 metres	Yuliya Timofeyeva (RUS)	12.11	Yekaterina Grigoryeva (RUS)	12.29	Francesca Cola (ITA)	12.33
200 metres	Yuliya Timofeyeva (RUS)	24.70	Jani Chathurangani Silva (SRI)	24.80	Olga Goncharenko (RUS)	25.27
400 metres	Awatef Ben Hassine (TUN)	54.37	Olga Maksimova (RUS)	54.40	Omolade Akinremi (USA)†	54.44
800 metres	Seltana Aït Hammou (MAR)	2:06.86	Brigita Langerholc (SLO)	2:07.38	Svetlana Klyuka (RUS)	2:07.84
1500 metres	Tatyana Buloychik (BLR)	4:27.67	Élodie Olivares (FRA)	4:27.97	Leïla Hmatou (MAR)	4:29.07
5000 metres	Mihaela Botezan (ROM)	15:10.69 GR	Zhor El Kamch (MAR)	15:15.41	Restituta Joseph (TAN)	15:19.53
Marathon	Jo Bun-Hui (PRK)	2:36:54	Oh Song-Suk (PRK)	2:40:03	Heléne Willix (SWE)	2:40:16
400 metres hurdles	Irêna Žauna (LAT)	57.35 GR	Omolade Akinremi (USA)†	58.82	Lara Rocco (ITA)	58.93
High jump	Anna Chicherova (RUS)	1.89 m	Olga Kaliturina (RUS)	1.89 m	Oana Pantelimon (ROM)	1.86 m
Long jump	Tatyana Ter-Mesrobyan (RUS)	6.03 m	Livea Pruteanu (ROM)	5.95 m	Cristina Nicolau (ROM)	5.93 m
Triple jump	Cristina Nicolau (ROM)	13.45 m GR	Livea Pruteanu (ROM)	13.29 m	Anja Valant (SLO)	12.65 m
Hammer throw	Zhang Wenxiu (CHN)	69.89 m GR	Ester Balassini (ITA)	65.70 m	Tatyana Lysenko (RUS)	56.50 m
5000 m track walk	Yelena Nikolayeva (RUS)	22:11.69 GR	Cristiana Pellino (ITA)	22:35.78	Olga Kardopoltseva (BLR)	22:36.27

- † Note: Omolade Akinremi represented the USA as a member of the United States Air Force, although she holds Nigerian nationality.

== Medal table ==
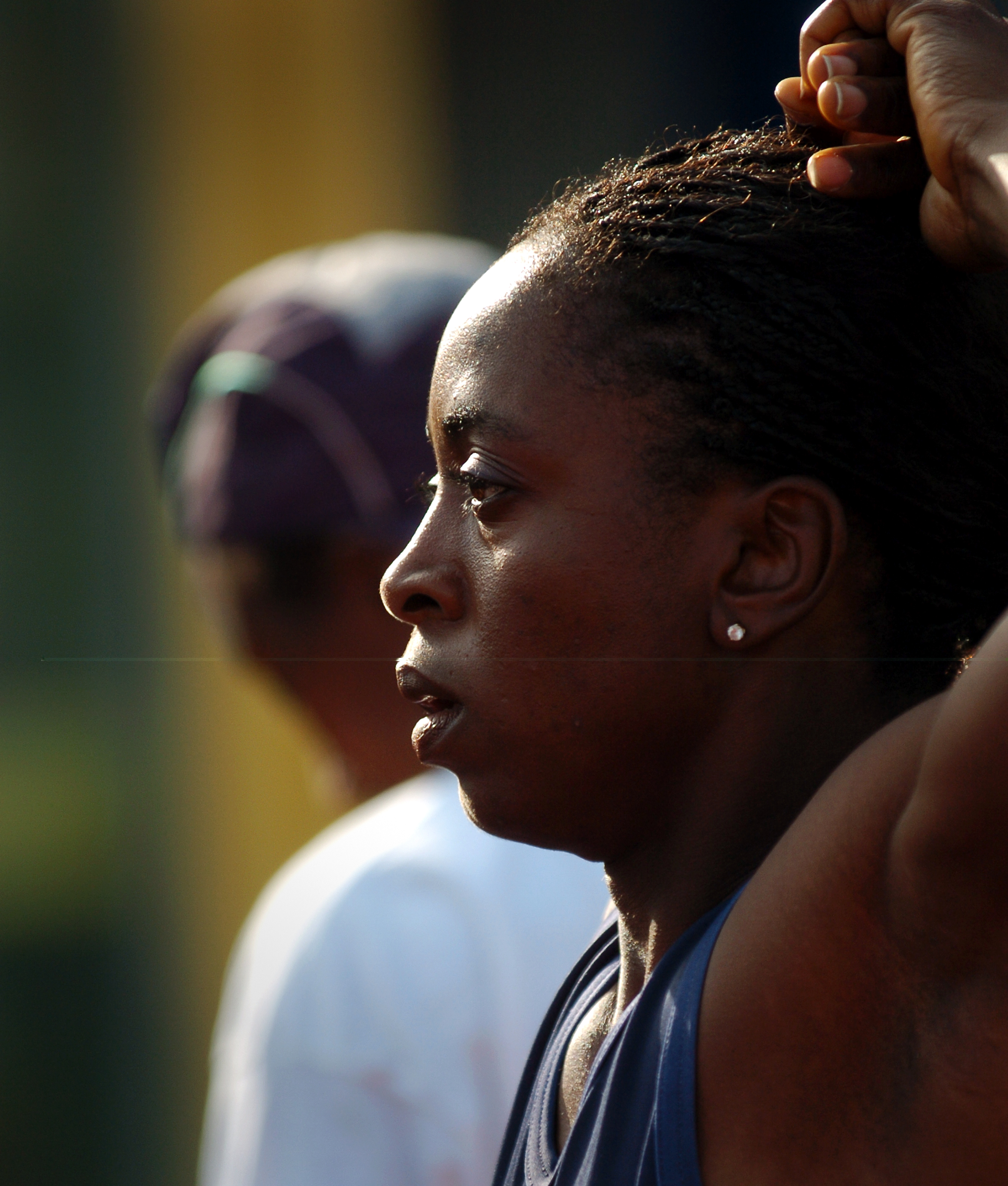
Omolade Akinremi won 400 m bronze and hurdles silver for the United States.

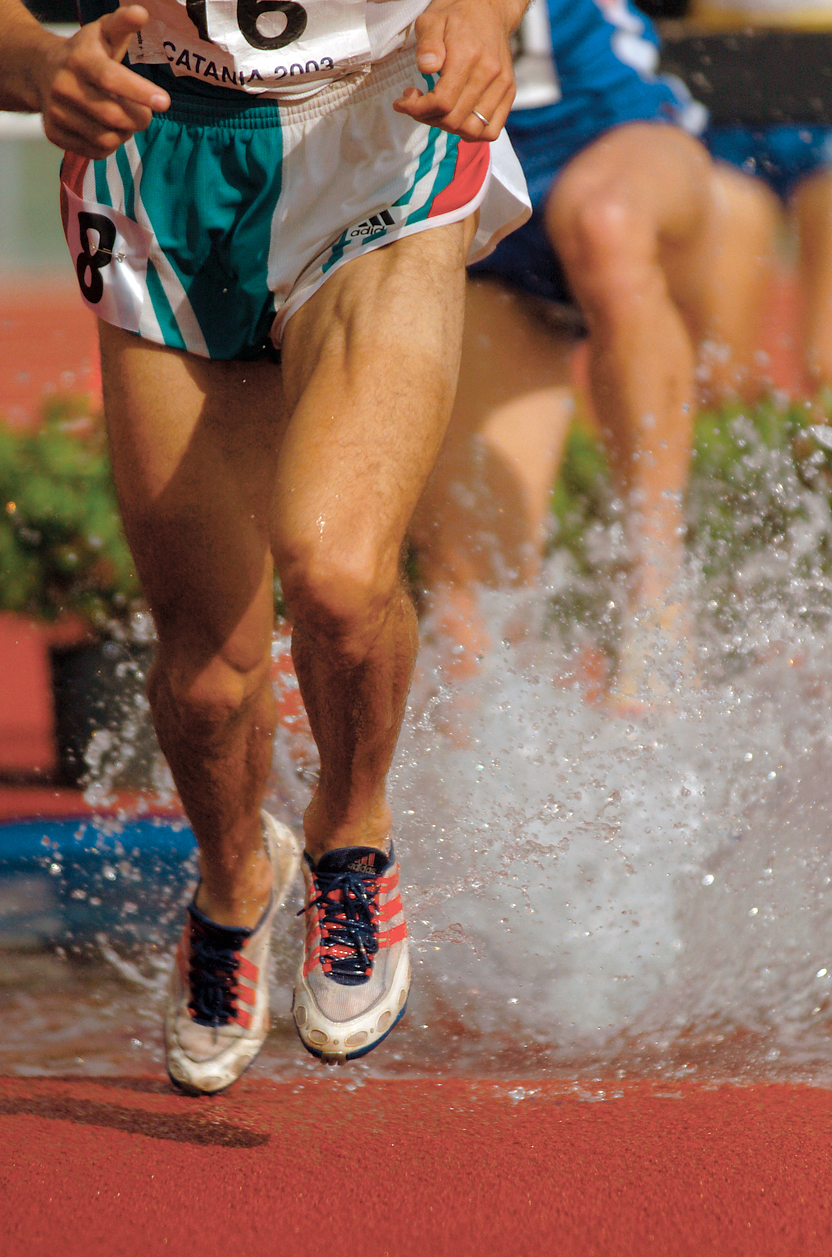
The competition was marked by rainy conditions.

* Host nation (Italy)

Rank	Nation	Gold	Silver	Bronze	Total
1	Russia	9	7	7	23
2	Italy*	4	3	4	11
3	Kenya	4	3	2	9
4	Romania	2	2	3	7
5	Morocco	2	1	1	4
5	Poland	2	1	1	4
7	Slovenia	2	0	1	3
8	Slovakia	2	0	0	2
9	Saudi Arabia	1	3	2	6
10	Brazil	1	3	0	4
11	Ukraine	1	2	0	3
12	Bahrain	1	1	0	2
12	Latvia	1	1	0	2
12	North Korea	1	1	0	2
15	Belarus	1	0	2	3
16	Greece	1	0	1	2
17	China	1	0	0	1
17	Tunisia	1	0	0	1
19	France	0	1	0	1
19	Rwanda	0	1	0	1
19	South Korea	0	1	0	1
19	Sri Lanka	0	1	0	1
23	Algeria	0	0	1	1
23	Austria	0	0	1	1
23	Belgium	0	0	1	1
23	Botswana	0	0	1	1
23	Colombia	0	0	1	1
23	Cyprus	0	0	1	1
23	Finland	0	0	1	1
23	Qatar	0	0	1	1
23	Sweden	0	0	1	1
23	Tanzania	0	0	1	1
Totals (32 entries)		37	32	34	103
