= Spincloud Heights =

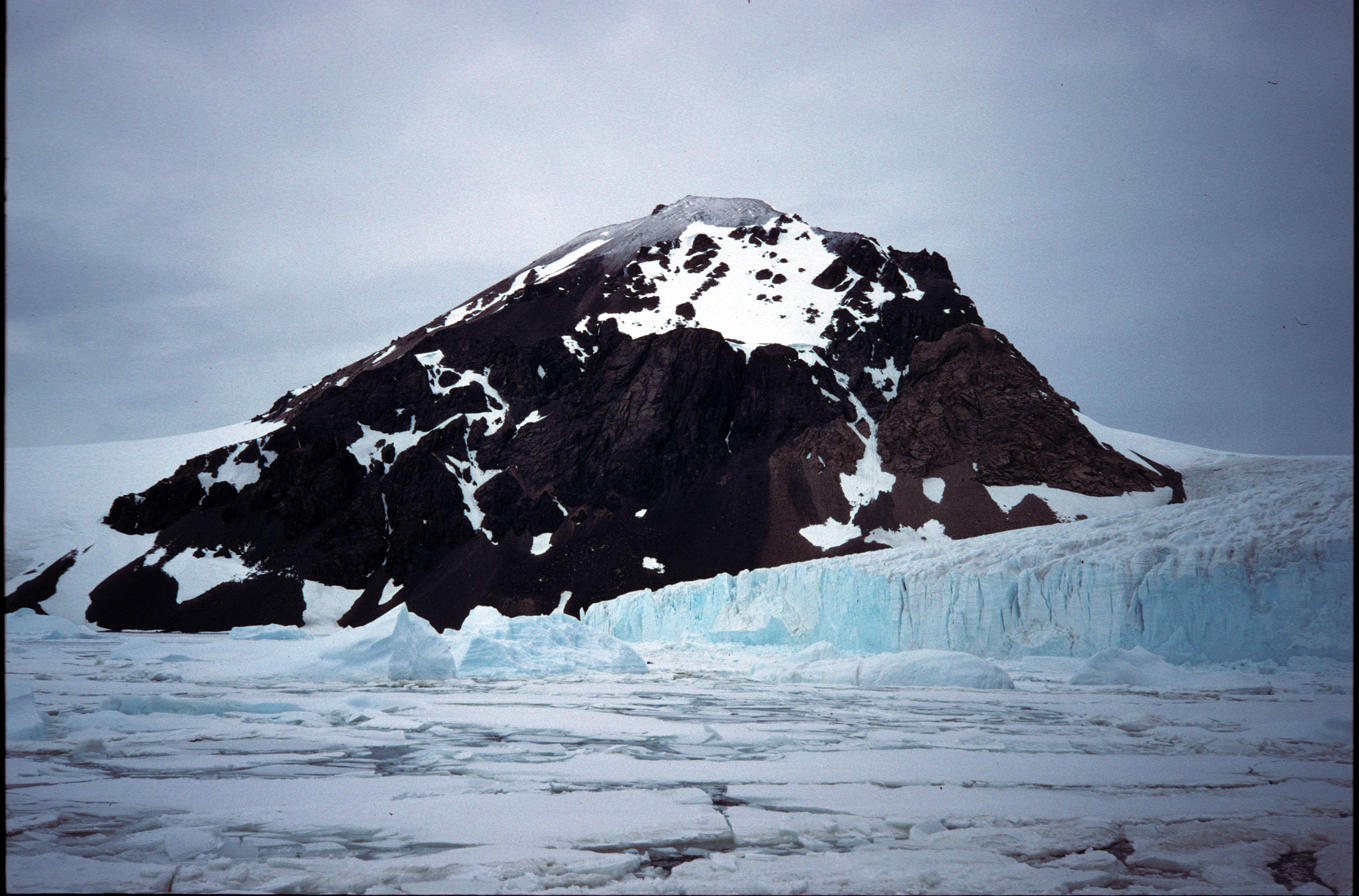
Spincloud Heights

Spincloud Heights (67°50′S 67°9′W) is a heights bordering the north side of Shoesmith Glacier on Horseshoe Island. Surveyed by Falkland Islands Dependencies Survey (FIDS) in 1955–57, and so named because clouds of spindrift blowing off the heights give warning of approaching storms.
