= Kim Jong-chul (disambiguation) =

Kim Jong-chul, Kim Jung-chul or Kim Jong-chol, is the name of a number of North Korean people, including:

- Kim Jong-chul
- Kim Jong-chul (poet)
- Kim Jong-chol (athlete)
- Kim Jung-chul
