= McMaster =

McMaster may refer to:

- McMaster University, a public research university in Hamilton, Ontario, Canada
- Mount McMaster, in Enderby Land, East Antarctica
- McMaster (surname)
- McMaster School, a building of the University of South Carolina

== See also ==
- McMaster-Carr, industrial supply company
- MacMaster (surname)
- McMasters (surname)

.
