= O Song-suk =

North Korean long-distance runner

- Hangul: 오성숙
- RR: O Seongsuk
- MR: O Sŏngsuk

O Song-suk (born 2 September 1977) is a North Korean long-distance runner who competes in the marathon. Her personal best time is 2:31:14 hours, achieved in April 2002 in Pyongyang.

She finished 23rd in the marathon at the 2005 World Championships. She also won the 2004 Pyongyang Marathon.

She was the silver medallist at the 2003 Military World Games.

== Achievements ==
- All results regarding marathon, unless stated otherwise

Year	Competition	Venue	Position	Notes
Representing North Korea
2004	Pyongyang Marathon	Pyongyang, North Korea	1st	2:36:10
2005	World Championships	Helsinki, Finland	23rd	2:34:07
