= McMasters =

McMaster is a surname of Gaelic origin. The McMaster family originated in Scotland before having their land dispossessed by the Macleans. Ever since losing their land the McMaster surname has migrated throughout England, The United States, Canada, Australia and New Zealand.

Notable people with the surname include:

- Gerald McMaster, Artist, Author and Curator of Siksika Nation
- Henry A. McMasters (1848–1872), Medal of Honor holder
- Jake McMasters (born 1950), American author a.k.a. David L. Robbins
- Timothy McMaster (born 1974) Wrestler (Porter), musician and former Libertarian politician from Pennsylvania.

== See also ==
- McMaster (disambiguation)
- MacMaster (surname)
