= Sally Cove =

Coordinates: 67°48′S 67°17′W

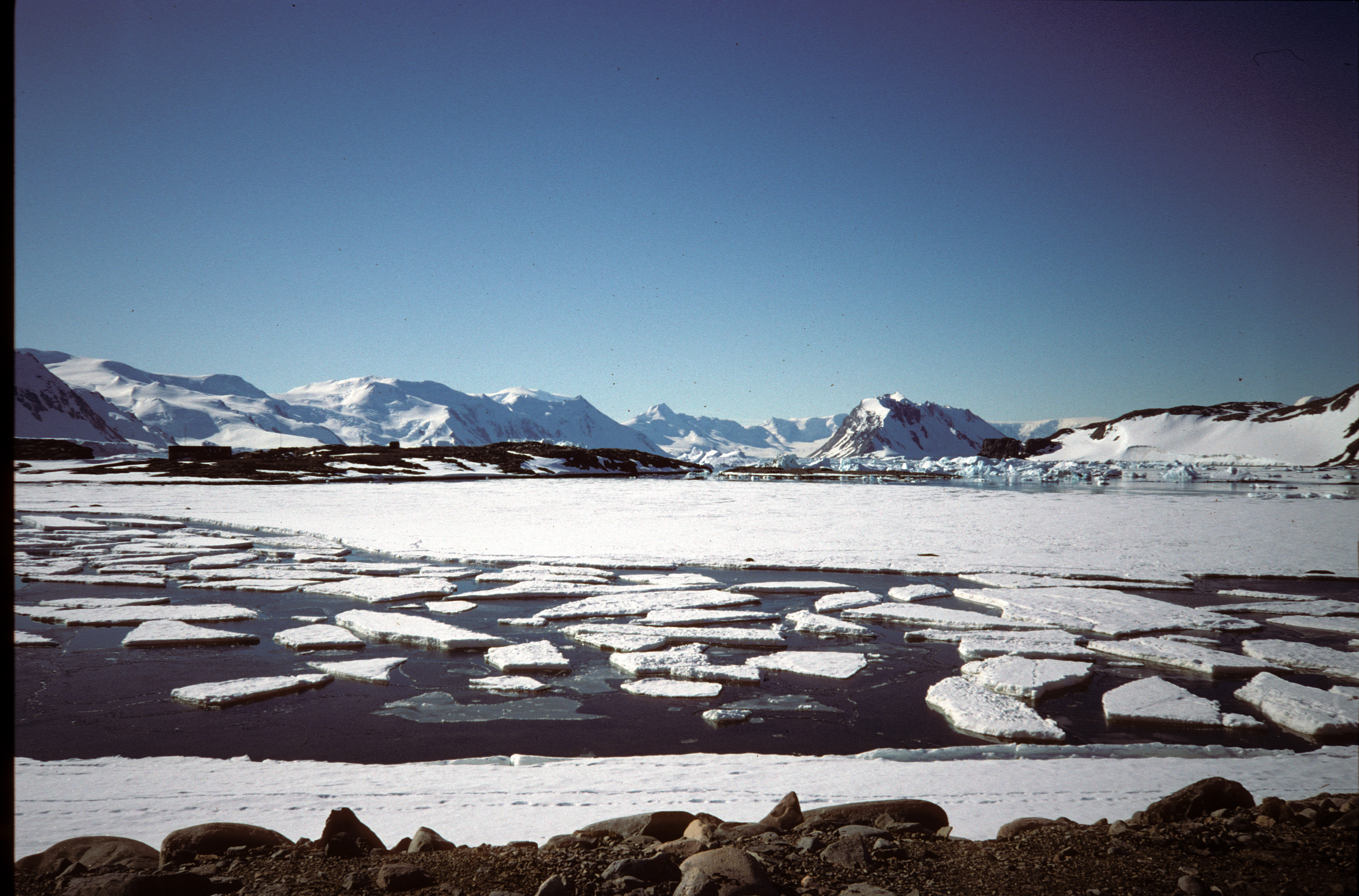
Sally Cove, with the Horseshoe Island hut

Sally Cove is a cove indenting the northwest shore of Horseshoe Island, off Graham Land. It was named by United Kingdom Antarctic Place-Names Committee (UK-APC) because the cove was used by all sledging parties leaving ("sallying") the nearby Falkland Islands Dependencies Survey (FIDS) station for the north.
