= Track and field at the 1999 Military World Games =

Track and field at the II World Military Games
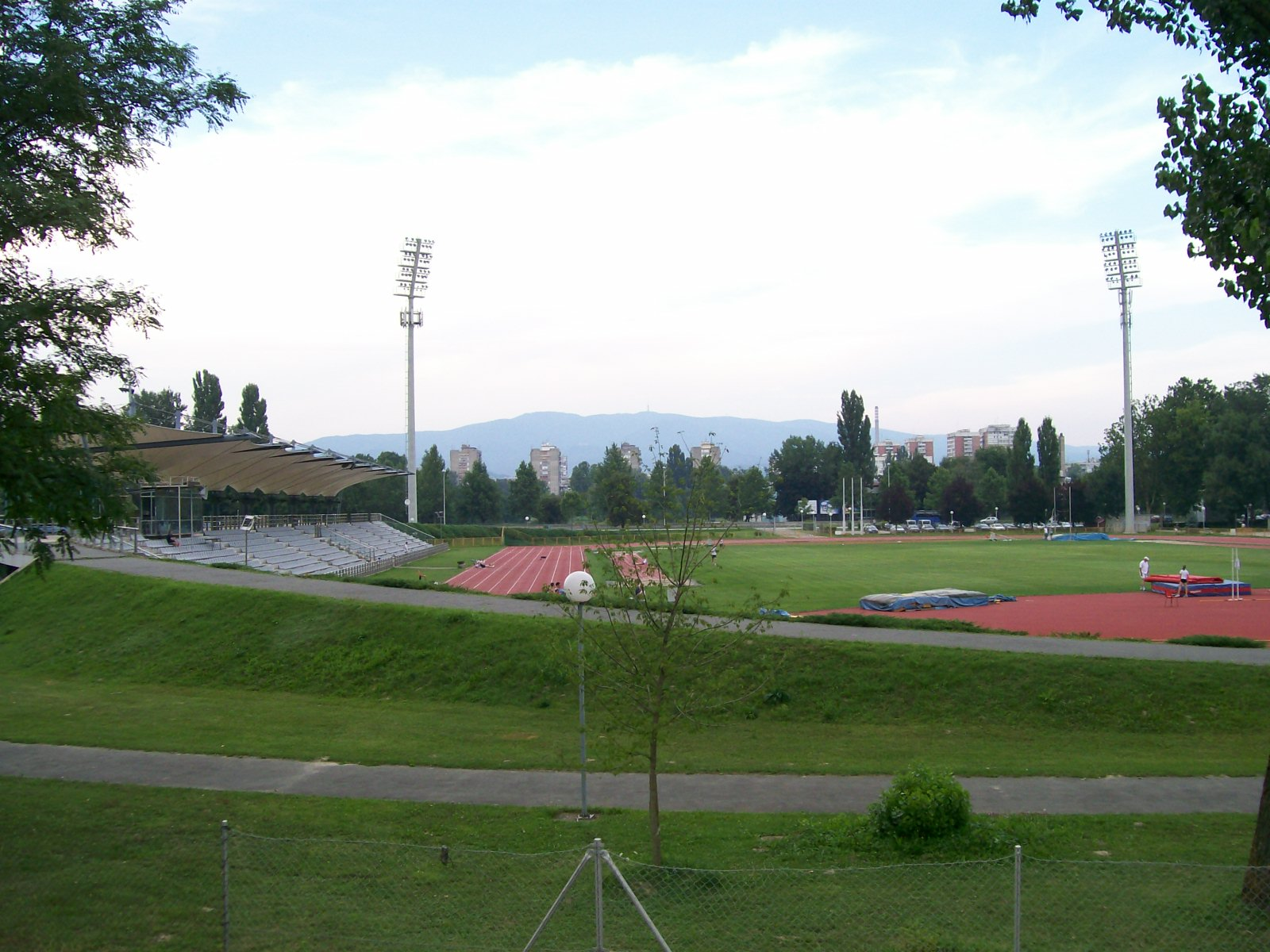
- The host stadium for the athletics events
- Dates: 11–16 August 1999
- Host city: Zagreb, Croatia
- Venue: Sportski park Mladost athletic stadium
- Level: Military personnel
- Events: 32
- Records set: 22 Games records

At the 1999 Military World Games, the track and field events were held at the Sportski park Mladost athletic stadium in Zagreb, Croatia from 11–16 August. A total of 32 events were contested, of which 22 by male and 10 by female athletes. The marathon events were held on 11 August, prior to the track and field competition. It was the last time that the men's 20 kilometres walk and women's shot put featured on the programme. The women's 1500 metres and 5000 metres were added to the programme for the first time (the latter replacing the 3000 metres distance). Nations could enter a maximum of two athletes into each event.

Only three athletes successfully defended their titles from the inaugural edition: Shem Kororia won the men's 5000 m to retain his gold medal, Boris Henry defended his title in the men's javelin throw, while Yekaterina Leshchova repeated as women's 100 metres champion and also added the 200 metres title to her honours. A total of 22 Games records were set during the competition, including new records in all but two of the women's events and all the men's field events. Seven world bests for military competition were set during the competition.

Italy topped the medal table in the athletics competition, having taken four golds and fourteen medals in total. Kenya was the next most successful nation with four medals of each colour. Germany also won four gold medals, while Russia had the third highest medal total with eleven. Host nation Croatia won five athletics medals, though none of them gold.

Several athletes went on to success at the 1999 World Championships in Athletics held one week later, including Djabir Saïd-Guerni (800 m bronze), Fabrizio Mori (400 m hurdles gold) and Nadine Kleinert (shot put silver). The games-winning Polish men's 4×400 metres relay team also became world champions that year.

== Medal summary ==
=== Men ===
Event	Gold		Silver		Bronze	
100 metres	Anatoliy Dovhal (UKR)	10.34 GR	Martin Lachkovics (AUT)	10.42	Vitaliy Seniv (UKR)	10.42
200 metres	Malik Louahla (ALG)	20.96	Maurizio Checcucci (ITA)	21.07	Massimiliano Donati (ITA)	21.14
400 metres	Ibrahima Wade (SEN)	45.92	Julius Chepkwony (KEN)	46.16	Salaheddine Safi Bakar (QAT)	46.35
800 metres	Djabir Saïd-Guerni (ALG)	1:46.41	Flávio Godoy (BRA)	1:47.94	Charles Makau (KEN)	1:48.04
1500 metres	Sammy Mutai (KEN)	3:38.94	Stephen Kipkorir (KEN)	3:40.25	Branko Zorko (CRO)	3:41.06
5000 metres	Shem Kororia (KEN)	13:50.51	Miroslav Vanko (SVK)	13:52.01	Viktor Röthlin (SUI)	13:58.52
10,000 metres	Elijah Korir (KEN)	28:24.82	William Kalya (KEN)	28:31.30	Róbert Štefko (SVK)	28:49.90
110 metres hurdles	Staņislavs Olijars (LAT)	13.32 GR	Falk Balzer (GER)	13.44	Igor Kováč (SVK)	13.63
400 metres hurdles	Thomas Goller (GER)	48.75 GR	Fabrizio Mori (ITA)	48.83	Hillary Maritim (KEN)	49.48
3000 metres steeplechase	Khamis Abdullah Saifeldin (QAT)	8:21.92	Jonathan Kandie (KEN)	8:22.81	Christopher Koskei (KEN)	8:31.19
4×100 metres relay	Italy (ITA); Andrea Rabino; Massimiliano Donati; Maurizio Checcucci; Giovanni Puggioni	39.92 GR	Ukraine (UKR); Dmitriy Myshka; Vitaly Seniv; Anatoliy Dovhal; Hennadiy Horbenko	40.10	Croatia (CRO); Tihomir Buinjac; Dejan Vojnovic; Vjekoslav Orsolic; Slaven Krajacic	40.23
4×400 metres relay	Poland (POL); Marcin Jędrusiński; Piotr Rysiukiewicz; Jacek Bocian; Robert Maćkowiak	3:02.78 GR	Russia (RUS); Daniyil Shekin; Mikhail Vdovin; Innokentiy Zharov; Andrey Semyonov	3:02.98	Kenya (KEN); Samson Yego Kipchirchir; Hillary Maritim; David Kirui; Julius Chepkwony	3:03.43
Marathon	Grzegorz Gajdus (POL)	2:16:40	Kim Jong-chol (PRK)	2:18:08	Gino Van Geyte (BEL)	2:18:22
20 km walk	Aigars Fadejevs (LAT)	1:21:42 GR	Marco Giungi (ITA)	1:21:47	Andrey Makarov (BLR)	1:22:56
High jump	Ivan Bernasconi (ITA)	2.27 m GR	Abderrahmane Hammad (ALG)	2.27 m GR	Vyacheslav Tyrtyshnik (UKR)	2.24 m
Pole vault	Maurilio Mariani (ITA)	5.70 m GR=	Michael Stolle (GER)	5.70 m GR=	Yevgeniy Smiryagin (RUS)	5.65 m
Long jump	Huang Le (CHN)	8.21 m GR	Chen Jing (CHN)	8.15 m	Kostas Koukodimos (GRE)	8.09 m
Triple jump	Remmy Limo (KEN)	16.84 m (w)	Paolo Camossi (ITA)	16.80 m GR	Vyacheslav Taranov (RUS)	16.76 m
Shot put	Paolo Dal Soglio (ITA)	20.39 m GR	Roman Virastyuk (UKR)	19.90 m	Pavol Pankuch (SVK)	19.06 m
Discus throw	Andreas Seelig (GER)	63.52 m GR	Igor Primc (SLO)	61.67 m	Diego Fortuna (ITA)	59.85 m
Hammer throw	Andriy Skvaruk (UKR)	79.76 m GR	Nicola Vizzoni (ITA)	78.04 m	Sergey Kirmasov (RUS)	77.02 m
Javelin throw	Boris Henry (GER)	85.69 m GR	Harri Haatainen (FIN)	82.76 m	Andreas Linden (GER)	78.93 m

=== Women ===
Event	Gold		Silver		Bronze	
100 metres	Yekaterina Leshchova (RUS)	11.41 GR	Rahela Markt (CRO)	11.71	Francesca Cola (ITA)	11.77
200 metres	Yekaterina Leshchova (RUS)	23.24 GR	Rahela Markt (CRO)	23.74	Uta Rohländer (GER)	23.88
400 metres	Irina Rosikhina (RUS)	52.46 GR	Kristina Perica (CRO)	53.04	Melissa Straker (BAR)	53.05
800 metres	Natalya Dukhnova (BLR)	2:00.84 GR	Yelena Buzhenko (UKR)	2:01.39	Heike Meißner (GER)	2:01.78
1500 metres	Helena Javornik (SLO)	4:07.34 GR	Yelena Zadorozhnaya (RUS)	4:09.03	Olga Komyagina (RUS)	4:09.87
5000 metres	Restituta Joseph (TAN)	15:31.49 GR	Elisa Rea (ITA)	15:32.67	Helena Javornik (SLO)	15:37.50
Marathon	Hong Ok-Dan (PRK)	2:35:25 GR	Ri Hyon-Gyong (PRK)	2:39:50	Kimberly Markland (USA)	2:46:31
High jump	Iryna Mykhalchenko (UKR)	1.95 m	Vita Styopina (UKR)	1.92 m	Olga Kychanova (RUS)	1.92 m
Long jump	Valentīna Gotovska (LAT)	6.64 m	Olena Khlopotnova (UKR)	6.57 m	Yu Yiqun (CHN)	6.36 m
Shot put	Nadine Kleinert (GER)	19.12 m GR	Larisa Peleshenko (RUS)	18.35 m	Mara Rosolen (ITA)	17.68 m

== Medal table ==
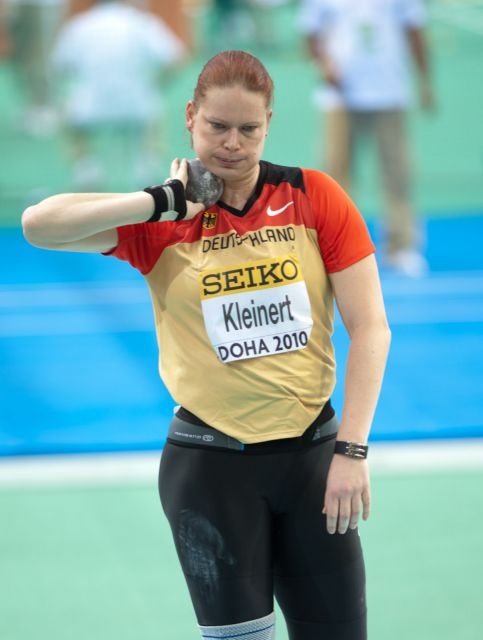
Nadine Kleinert won shot put gold for Germany with a military world best.

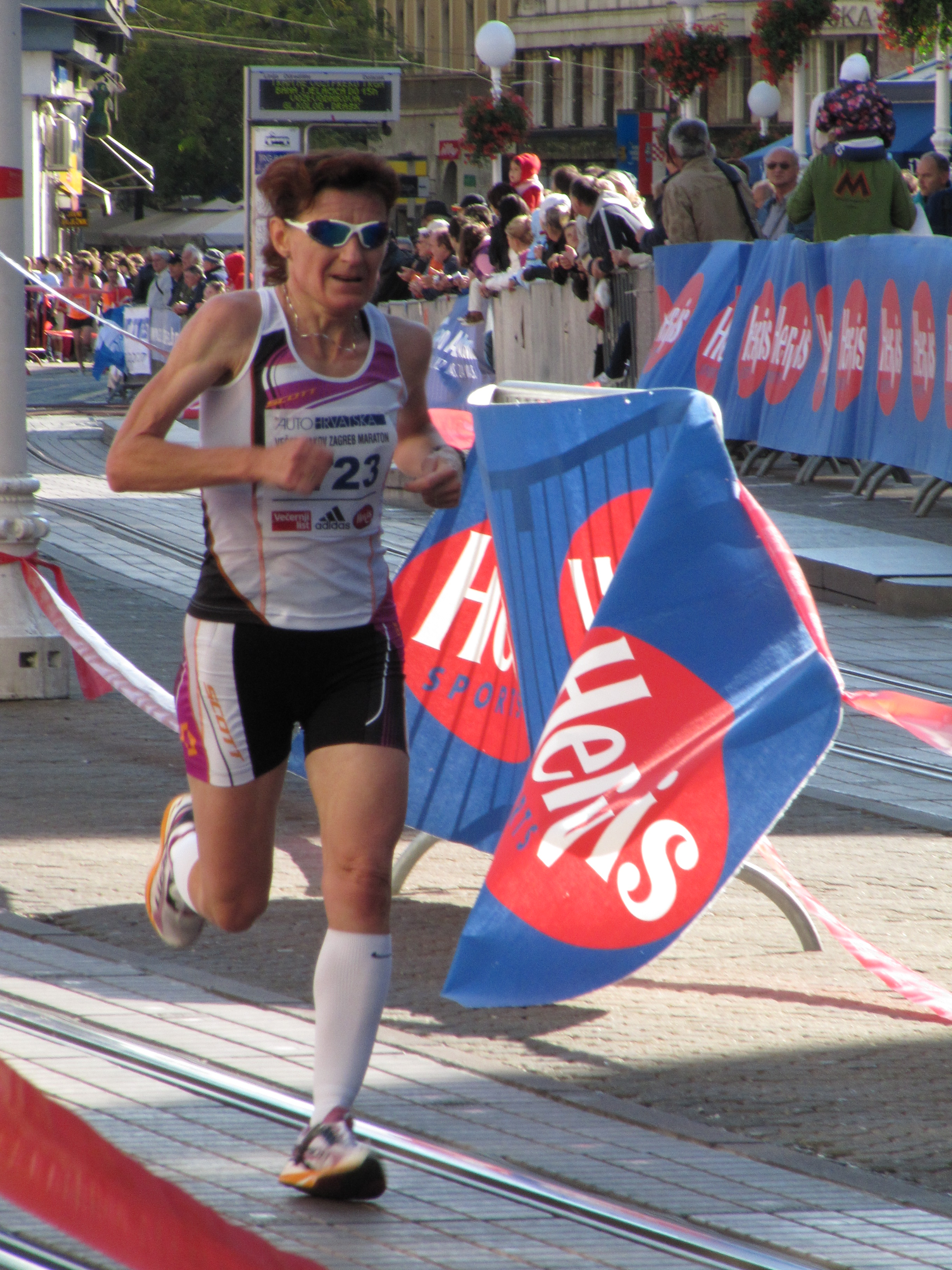
Helena Javornik won two of Slovenia's three medals at the competition.

* Host nation (Croatia)

Rank	Nation	Gold	Silver	Bronze	Total
1	Italy	4	6	4	14
2	Kenya	4	4	4	12
3	Germany	4	2	3	9
4	Ukraine	3	5	2	10
5	Russia	3	3	5	11
6	Latvia	3	0	0	3
7	Algeria	2	1	0	3
8	Poland	2	0	0	2
9	North Korea	1	2	0	3
10	China	1	1	1	3
10	Slovenia	1	1	1	3
12	Belarus	1	0	1	2
12	Qatar	1	0	1	2
14	Senegal	1	0	0	1
14	Tanzania	1	0	0	1
16	Croatia*	0	3	2	5
17	Slovakia	0	1	3	4
18	Austria	0	1	0	1
18	Brazil	0	1	0	1
18	Finland	0	1	0	1
21	Barbados	0	0	1	1
21	Belgium	0	0	1	1
21	Greece	0	0	1	1
21	Switzerland	0	0	1	1
21	United States	0	0	1	1
Totals (25 entries)		32	32	32	96
