= Ryoko Eda =

Japanese marathon runner

Ryoko Eda (née Kitajima, Japanese: 北島 良子, romanized: Kitajima Ryoko; born 12 June 1976) is a Japanese marathon runner. Her personal best time is 2:24:54 hours, achieved at the 2005 Nagoya Marathon.

== Achievements ==
- All results regarding marathon, unless stated otherwise

Year	Competition	Venue	Position	Notes
Representing Japan
2005	World Championships	Helsinki, Finland	17th	2:31:16
