= Yulia Timofeeva =

Russian sprinter and bobsledder

Yulia Yurevna Timofeeva (Russian: Юлия Юpьевна Тимофеева; born May 3, 1972) is a Russian former track and field sprinter and bobsledder since 2008. She finished 18th in the two-woman event at the 2010 Winter Olympics in Vancouver.

Timofeeva's best World Cup finish was 12th three times in 2009 and 2010.

Her track sprinting career lasted from 1997 to 2007. She competed in distances from 60 metres up to 400 metres. Lifetime bests in the 200 metres and 400 m came in 1997, with runs of 23.09 and 54.18 seconds, respectively. A 60 m indoor career best followed in 1998, with a time of 7.32 seconds. She competed at national level during this period and was a 60 m and 100 metres semi-finalist at the Russian Championships in 2002. The peak of her career came in 2003 when she ranked sixth in the 60 m and fifth in the 200 m at the national championships. This resulted in her selection for Russia at the 2003 Military World Games, where she took the 100 m and 200 m gold medals (succeeding her compatriot Yekaterina Grigoryeva in doing this feat). She failed to reach such heights again, although in 2005 she was twice a national semi-finalist and set a lifetime best of 11.60 seconds for the 100 m. Her performances declined thereafter and she retired from the sport at the age of 35.

== Personal bests ==
- 60 metres – 7.32 sec (1998)
- 100 metres – 11.60 sec (2005)
- 200 metres – 23.09 sec (1997)
- 400 metres – 54.18 sec (1997)
