= Russet Pikes =

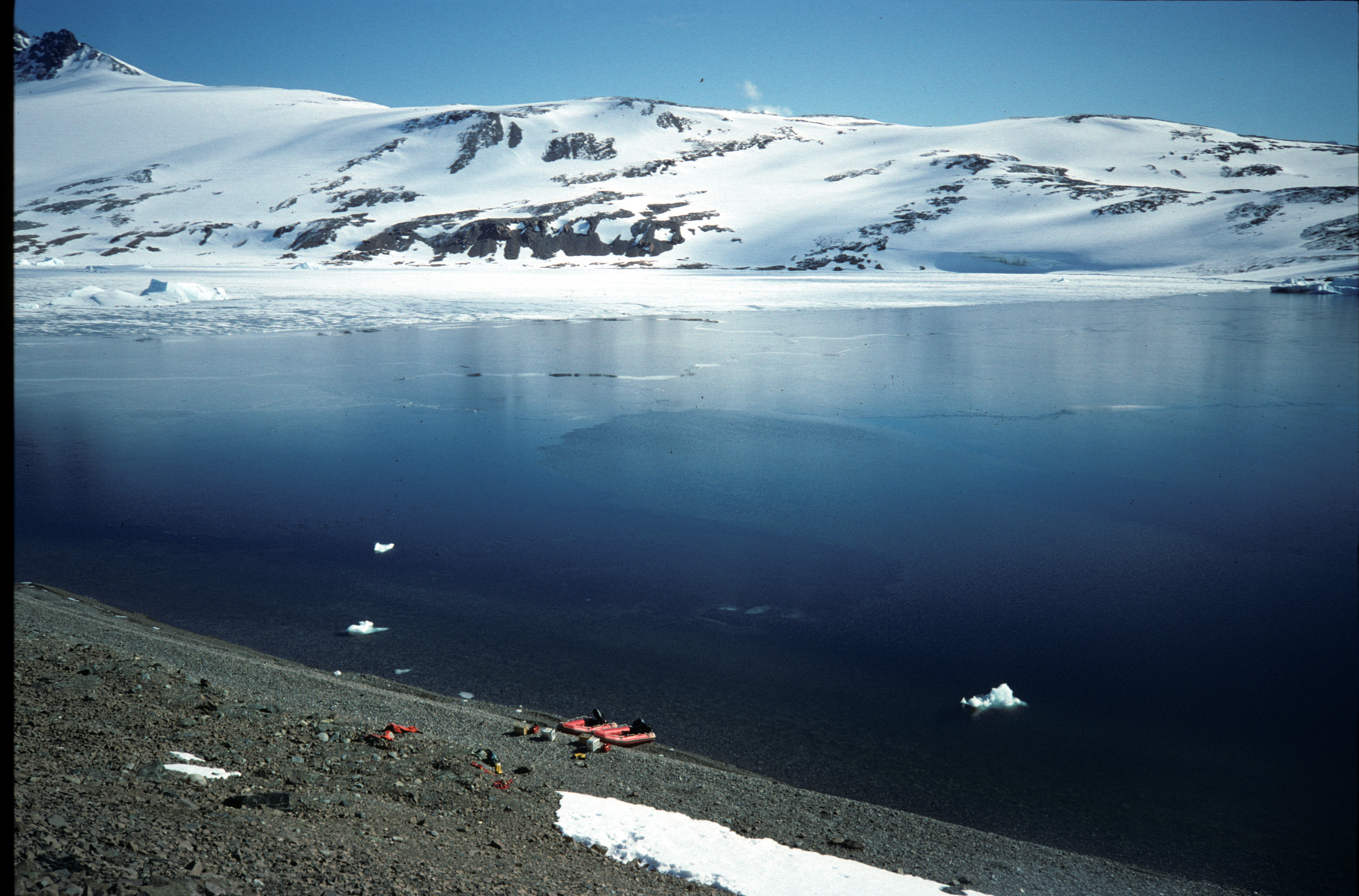
Russet Pikes

Russet Pikes (67°49′S 67°8′W) are Antarctic peaks just east of the mouth of Gaul Cove on Horseshoe Island. Surveyed by Falkland Islands Dependencies Survey (FIDS) in 1955–57. The name is descriptive; reddish-brown colour is visible on the feature most of the year, the slopes being too steep to retain snow cover for any length of time.
