= Mario Marcel Salas =

American activist (born 1949)

Mario Marcel Salas (born July 30, 1949) is an American civil rights leader, author and politician.

== Early and personal life ==
Salas was born in San Antonio, Texas. His parents were an Afro-Mexican father and a mixed race mother. He graduated from Phyllis Wheatley High School, an African American segregated school, which like many black schools across the country remained segregated long after the 1954 Brown v. Board of Education decision.

Soon after high school, he joined the Student Nonviolent Coordinating Committee (SNCC). He entered San Antonio College and graduated with two associate degrees, in Applied Science-Engineering Technology and Liberal Arts. He received his Bachelor of Arts degree in English from the University of Texas at San Antonio (UTSA) in 1987. He received two graduate degrees. one in Education and the other in Political Science. He is a retired Assistant Professor of Political Science, having taught Texas Politics, Federal Politics, Political History, the Politics of Mexico, African American Studies, Civil Rights, and International Conflicts. He is a current lecturer at UTSA. He also served as a City Councilman for the City of San Antonio, and was active in the Civil Rights Movement for many years. He is also a life time member of the San Antonio NAACP. He has authored several textbooks including, Foundation Myth in Political Thought: The Racial Moorings of Foundation Myth. Professor Salas helped to develop the first economic relationship with an African country for the City of San Antonio with Mafeking, South Africa.

Salas championed the establishment of a Dr. Martin Luther King Jr. Texas state holiday and served as Vice-President for the Judson Independent School Board of Trustees. He is the President of San Antonio Community Radio (KROV) and is active in San Antonio Politics. He is a 300-Year Tricentennial Commissioner for the City of San Antonio and a member of the Bexar County Historical Commission. He is married to Edwina Lacy Salas and has two children, Angela and Elena and 3 grandchildren. He is considered an expert in the history of African Americans in San Antonio.

== Career ==
Salas organized most of the Black student unions on San Antonio college campuses in 1969, and was co-founder of the Barbara Jordan Community Center in San Antonio. Along with former SNCC member Rick Greene and former Speaker of the Texas House Gib Lewis, he negotiated the Martin Luther King Jr. state holiday.

Salas writes for several African American newspapers, and was the chief negotiator for the first cable television franchise in San Antonio.

Salas was involved in the liberation of Grenada as a supporter of the movement against Grenadian prime minister Eric Gairy in 1979. Salas has been critical of the Iraq War.

In addition to teaching at the University of Texas at San Antonio, as of 2017 he was a writer for the San Antonio Observer.

== Personal life ==
He married Edwina Lacy, of Chicago, Illinois, on July 9, 1988. They had two children, Elena Patrice and Angela Christine.
