= Arleigh B. Templeton =

- Templeton in 1972

16th President of the University of Texas at El Paso
- In office 1972–1980

1st President of the University of Texas at San Antonio
- In office 1970–1972

8th President of Sam Houston State University
- In office 1964–1970

Personal details
- Born: April 18, 1916 New Waverly, Texas
- Died: October 28, 2006 (aged 90) San Antonio, Texas
- Spouse: Maxi Groce Templeton m.1938
- Children: Earl Wayne Templeton (adopted at age 9)
- Education: Sam Houston State Teachers College; University of Houston

Arleigh Brantley Templeton (April 18, 1916 – October 28, 2006) was an American academic administrator. He was the president of Alvin Junior College, Sam Houston State University and the University of Texas at El Paso. He was also the first president of the University of Texas at San Antonio. Templeton served as president of the Southern Association of Colleges and Schools.

== Biography ==
Templeton was born in New Waverly, Texas. He received an undergraduate degree from Sam Houston State Teachers College in 1936 and master's and doctoral degrees from the University of Houston. He was only 19 when he became a principal and simultaneously an English, Spanish and algebra teacher at Willow Hole High School in Texas. Between 1937 and 1940, he was the school’s principal and a biology, physics and math teacher at League City High School. After serving in World War II and working for an oil company, he became an assistant superintendent for several school districts in the Greater Houston area.

After a stint as president of Alvin Junior College between 1954 and 1964, Templeton became president of Sam Houston State Teachers College. He succeeded Harmon Lowman, who had governed with a more informal style. Templeton made more demands on the Sam Houston faculty than his predecessor, placing an importance on student and faculty research and on increasing the percentage of doctorally-prepared professors. The school's name changed twice during his tenure, first to Sam Houston State College, then to Sam Houston State University in 1969. Sam Houston State's criminal justice programs were created during Templeton's time as president. Sam Houston State's criminal justice program offered the school's first doctoral degree.

He was installed as the first president of the University of Texas at San Antonio in 1970, where he served for two years. He was then the president of the University of Texas at El Paso for several years. Templeton's 1972 appointment as UTEP's president has been cited as an example of the power struggles that can occur in multicampus university systems. At a time when the university was facing several significant issues, including widespread protests by the Hispanic student population on campus, Templeton and other UTEP executives were appointed by the University of Texas System without the consultation of UTEP faculty.

Templeton retired from UTEP in 1980. He and his wife moved to San Antonio, where he ran a job training center until his 1999 retirement.

== Honors ==
Templeton was named a Distinguished Alumnus by Sam Houston State University in 1977. He was elected president of the Southern Association of Colleges and Schools in 1967, was appointed to Texas governor John B. Connally's Committee on Education Beyond the High School, and spent 30 years on the Texas Higher Education Coordinating Board.
