= James Bodenstedt =

American businessman

- Education: University of Texas at San Antonio
- Occupation: Retired

James Bodenstedt is the former President and CEO of MUY! Brands, an operator of franchised restaurants, including Wendy's and the Yum! Brands of Taco Bell, KFC, Pizza Hut, and others. He and his wife were major donors to President Donald Trump's 2020 election campaign, donating more than $1 million. MUY! Brands and its subsidiaries were among the first companies to receive coronavirus relief aid by the Trump administration.

== Early life ==
Bodenstedt discovered his passion for business while working for McDonalds as a teen, taking their management training program at the age of 16 and by 17, he was a general manager. James would later go on to receive his bachelor's degree in accounting from University of Texas at San Antonio and in 2003 founded MUY Brands.

== Career ==
Bodenstedt was chief operating officer and chief financial officer of R&L Foods in 2010 while building MUY.

=== MUY! Brands ===
MUY! Brands (also known as MUY! Companies, MUY Brands, Muy Restaurants, Muy Consulting, or Muy Cos) is based in San Antonio, Texas. Bodenstedt purchased 18 Texas locations in 2003 to start MUY!. By 2010 it had 118 locations, by 2012 it had 230 locations in Texas and New Mexico, and at least 635 locations by 2016, with annual revenue over $630 million. MUY purchased 70 Dallas, Texas restaurants directly from Wendy's in 2014, and in 2016, 75 franchises from Richard Fox's Great Lakes Restaurant Management in Cleveland, Ohio and Upstate New York. The latter purchase made MUY the largest Wendy's franchisee.

In 2019, MUY settled a Department of Justice investigation over employment discrimination. MUY paid a $175,000 fine to the Justice Department, as well as requirements for back pay and mandatory training.

In January 2020, an attempted robbery of a MUY! Wendy's in Edinboro, Pennsylvania led to the shooting death of an employee. A fundraiser was held at the store, and Bodenstedt donated all sales, doubled by Muy, from the day to the victim's family.

Bodenstedt was part of a May 2020 White House roundtable to discuss restaurant recovery after the COVID-19 pandemic in the United States. Bodenstedt had donated at least $440,000 to Trump's campaign.
