= Seyit Halil Özsoy =

Turkish politician (1948–2025)

Member of the Grand National Assembly of Turkey for Kayseri
- In office 14 December 1987 – 1 September 1991

Personal details
- Born: 1948; Kayseri, Turkey
- Died: 3 April 2025 (aged 76–77); Ankara, Turkey
- Political party: ANAP
- Education: Ankara University
- Occupation: Dentist

Seyit Halil Özsoy (1948 – 3 April 2025) was a Turkish politician. A member of the Motherland Party, he served in the Grand National Assembly from 1987 to 1991.

Özsoy died in Ankara on 3 April 2025.
