= Kim Jong-chol (runner) =

North Korean long-distance runner (born 1972)

Kim Jong Chul
Personal information
- Native name: 김종철
- Nationality: North Korean
- Born: 30 March 1972 (age 53)

Sport
- Sport: Long-distance running
- Event: Marathon

Kim Jong Chul (born 30 March 1972) is a North Korean long-distance runner. He competed in the men's marathon at the 2000 Summer Olympics.

At the 1999 Military World Games, Kim won the marathon silver medal behind Grzegorz Gajdus. After finishing 3rd at the 2000 Pyongyang Marathon, Kim placed 30th at the 2000 Olympic marathon. He returned to the Pyongyang Marathon the following year, placing 10th.
