= Susan Budge =

American ceramic sculptor

- Born: 1959 (age 66–67); Midland, TX
- Education: Texas Tech University of Houston University of Texas at San Antonio
- Occupations: Ceramic Sculptor and Professor

Susan Budge (b 1959) is an American ceramic sculptor who was born in Midland, Texas. She received a BFA in ceramics from Texas Tech University in 1983, an MA from the University of Houston in 1987, and an MFA from the University of Texas at San Antonio in 1999. She taught at San Jacinto College in Houston, San Antonio College, and the University of Texas at San Antonio, where she became a tenured full professor and Head of Ceramics.

Budge is best known for her large scale and Eye Spy sculptures which are abstract and usually monochromatic, except for the presence of a realistic human eye. Recognition of her work increased during her time in San Antonio when she was commissioned by the city to create three large scale sculptures Anaqua, Quercus, and Acequia, and forty ceramic tiles for Brackenridge Park. Eye Spy Eros from 2010, in the collection of the Honolulu Museum of Art, is an example and demonstrates how the eye can render an otherwise abstract form vaguely anthropomorphic. The Daum Museum of Contemporary Art (Sedalia, Missouri), The Fuller Craft Museum, the Honolulu Museum of Art, the New Orleans Museum of Art, Northern Arizona University Art Museum (Flagstaff, Arizona), the San Angelo Museum of Fine Arts (San Angelo, Texas), the San Antonio Museum of Art, the Art Museum of South Texas (Corpus Christi), and the Smithsonian Institution are among the public collections holding works by Susan Budge.

Eye Spy Eros by Susan Budge, Honolulu Museum of Art
