= Liza Hunter-Galvan =

New Zealand long-distance runner

Personal information
- National team: New Zealand
- Born: 25 June 1969 (age 56) Auckland, New Zealand
- Education: The University of Texas at San Antonio
- Years active: 24

Sport
- Country: New Zealand
- Sport: Long-distance running
- Event: Marathon
- College team: UTSA Roadrunners

Liza Marie Hunter-Galvan (born 25 June 1969 in Auckland) is a New Zealand long-distance runner. She qualified to run the Women's Marathon in both the 2004 Athens Olympic Games as well as the 2008 Beijing Olympics. She resides in San Antonio, Texas and has won the Marathon of the Americas on four occasions. During her collegiate career she competed for UTSA and won the 1992 SLC Cross Country individual title, helping lead the Roadrunners to their second of three straight league crowns, and also qualified for the NCAA Championships.

In August 2009, Hunter-Galvan admitted to taking the banned performance-enhancing substance EPO three times in her career, all of which were in 2009, after failing a drug test on March 23, 2009. She was banned from competition for two years starting May 2009. Hunter-Galvan publicly apologized for her mistake and never sought to represent New Zealand again. After the two-year hiatus, Hunter-Galvan was able to return to the sport in 2011 and competed at the San Antonio Rock 'n Roll Marathon where she ran a career best 2 hours, 29 minutes, 37 seconds. Hunter-Galvan completed her 24-year running career by winning the woman's 2016 San Antonio Rock 'n Roll Marathon with a time of 2 hours, 57 minutes and 17 seconds. Hunter-Galvan is still listed on the New Zealand Olympics roll of honour. In 2018, Hunter-Galvan was indicted for welfare fraud in San Antonio, Texas. The charges were subsequently dropped after Hunter-Galvan entered into negotiations and agreed to a plea bargain where she paid an amount in restitution.

== Achievements ==
Year	Competition	Venue	Position	Event	Notes
Representing New Zealand
2004	Olympic Games	Athens, Greece	51st	Marathon	2:50:23
2005	World Championships	Helsinki, Finland	39th	Marathon	2:39:47
2008	Olympic Games	Beijing, PR China	35th	Marathon	2:34:51
