= Meredith Hay =

American academic

- Education: University of Colorado Denver University of Texas at San Antonio
- Occupations: Professor and Biomedical Researcher

Meredith Hay is an American biomedical researcher and Professor in the Evelyn F. McKnight Brain Institute and in the Department of Psychology at University Arizona.

== Academic background ==
Hay, a Texas native, earned her B.A. in psychology from the University of Colorado, Denver, and her M.S. in neurobiology from the University of Texas at San Antonio, and her Ph.D. in cardiovascular pharmacology from the University of Texas Health Sciences Center, San Antonio. She trained as a postdoctoral fellow in the Cardiovascular Center at the University of Iowa College of Medicine and at Baylor College of Medicine in Houston. Prior to joining the faculty at the University of Missouri-Columbia in 1996, she was a faculty member in the Department of Physiology at the University of Texas Health Science Center at San Antonio.

From 2005 to 2008, Hay served as the Vice President for Research at the University of Iowa, providing the central leadership for all of the university's research, scholarly, and creative programs, including the academic medical center. She served as a spokesperson for the university, working with state and federal government leaders, private sector representatives, and local community groups.

In February 2008, Hay was named Executive Vice President and Provost at the University of Arizona, becoming the university's chief operating officer with responsibilities for the institution's budget. Following her tenure as Provost at the University of Arizona, she served as Special Advisor to the Chairman of the Arizona Board of Regents.

In November 2016, Hay was elected to the Governing Board of Pima Community College and served as vice-chair of the board from 2019-2021.

== Business links ==
Hay is President and founder of ProNeurogen, a Tucson biotechnology company which develops peptide-based therapeutics to treat vascular dementia and cognitive impairment caused by inflammation and cardiac disease.
