= Serkan Özsoy =

Turkish footballer

Personal information
- Full name: Serkan Özsoy
- Date of birth: 3 August 1978 (age 48)
- Place of birth: Üsküdar, Turkey
- Height: 1.85 m (6 ft 1 in)
- Position: Defender

Senior career*
Years	Team	Apps	(Gls)
1998–2002	Fenerbahçe	45	(1)
2002–2003	Trabzonspor	5	(0)
2003–2005	Malatyaspor	44	(1)
2005–2006	Manisaspor	7	(0)
2006	Gaziantepspor	1	(0)
2006–2008	Diyarbakırspor	42	(6)
2008	Boluspor	1	(0)
2009	Sakaryaspor	13	(0)
2009–2011	Kartal	42	(1)
2011	Adana Demirspor	15	(0)
2011–2013	Tavşanlı Linyitspor	39	(0)
2013–2014	Kahramanmaraşspor	41	(1)

International career
1999–2000	Turkey U21	9	(0)
- * Club domestic league appearances and goals

Serkan Özsoy (born 3 August 1978 in Üsküdar) is a Turkish former professional footballer who played as a Defender.

Özsoy played previously for Fenerbahçe, Trabzonspor, Malatyaspor, Vestel Manisaspor, Gaziantepspor, Diyarbakırspor, Boluspor, Sakaryaspor, Kartalspor and Adana Demirspor.
