= Victor Kibet =

Kenyan sprinter

Personal information
- Nationality: Kenyan
- Born: 26 June 1980 (age 46)

Sport
- Sport: Sprinting
- Event: 400 metres

Victor Kibet (born 26 June 1980) is a Kenyan sprinter. He competed in the men's 400 metres at the 2004 Summer Olympics.
