= Que McMaster =

Que McMaster (born 1942) is a former collegiate track and field coach with extensive experience at Baylor University, Odessa College and the University of Texas at San Antonio.

McMaster led the UTSA Roadrunners to their first Southland Conference outdoor track and field championship in 2001.

While at Baylor, he coached Olympic gold medalist and world record holder Michael Johnson. As assistant track and field coach at Baylor from 1974 to 1989, McMaster helped lead the Bears to the Southwest Conference (SWC) Indoor Championship in 1976 and to third place at the 1988 NCAA Outdoor Championships.

At Odessa, McMaster was the head men's and women's track and field coach from 1991 to 1993. He was named NJCAA "Coach of the Year" in 1991 after leading the Wranglers to the runner-up position at the Men's National Outdoor Championships. In 1993 he led Odessa to the Women's National Indoor Championship. In 1992, McMaster saw the Wranglers finish second nationally at the Women's National Outdoor Championships, while claiming third at the Women's National Indoor Championships.

He also has had high school coaching experience at San Antonio Sam Houston, where he led the Cherokees to district track and field championships in 1969, 1970, 1971, 1972, 1973 and 1974. Sam Houston also won the regional championship in 1973 and was undefeated in San Antonio invitational competition from 1969 until 1973.
