= MacMaster (surname) =

MacMaster (also Macmaster) is a Scottish surname, and may refer to:

== People ==
- Allan MacMaster (born 1974) Canadian politician
- Buddy MacMaster (1924–2014), Canadian musician, uncle of Natalie MacMaster
- Daniel MacMaster (1968–2008), Canadian rock singer
- Sir Donald Macmaster, 1st Baronet (1846–1922), Canadian politician
- Greg MacMaster (born 1962), member of the Michigan House of Representatives
- Ken MacMaster (born 1934), Canadian politician
- Mary Macmaster (born 1955), Scottish musician
- Natalie MacMaster (born 1972), Canadian fiddler

== Fictional people ==
- Alan MacMasters, fictional subject of a Wikipedia hoax claiming him to have invented the toaster

== See also ==
- MacMaster (disambiguation)
- McMaster (disambiguation)
