= Istanbul Technical University Polar Research Center =

Turkish research center

Polar Research Center
- Type: Research Center in University
- Established: January 17, 2015
- Director: Assist. Prof. Dr. Bilge TUTAK
- Location: Maslak / Istanbul, Turkey
- Website: https://www.polarresearch.center/en/

Istanbul Technical University Polar Research Center (ITU PolReC) was established in 2015. ITU PolReC is the first polar research center in Turkey. One year after its establishment, the ITU PolReC had its first expedition to Antarctica. ITU PolReC has MoU's with some of most known institute doing polar sciences

ITU PolReC participated in 38th ATCM in Sofia, Bulgaria, 39th ATCM in Santiago, Chile and 34th SCAR in Kuala Lumpur, Malaysia.

The founding director of ITU PolReC, Burcu Özsoy, is a remote sensing expert.

== Mission ==
ITU PolReC's mission is to research on the future of the Antarctic region for developing our country's visibility and have a say in international area and, at the same time, act as an interface between researchers in ITU and other universities of Turkey with national or international scientific, research, development, industrial bodies and authorities.

== Vision ==
ITU PolReC's vision is to conduct intercollegiate and international studies on Arctic, Antarctic, Ocean and Marine Sciences and raise public awareness about these topics; and also to contribute to Turkey's surplus value with referred about arctic studies in international area.

== Main Field of Activities ==
Participation of Turkey to international consortium of Antarctic Continent and provide to have a say

- Carry out studies for provide Turkey's have a say in future of arctic regions and act as an interface between researchers in ITU and other universities of Turkey with national or international scientific bodies and authorities,
- Carry out studies for provide that Turkish Arctic and Antarctic Research Programs (TuArk) current studies sustainability,
- Cooperative studies between other countries focus on Arctic, Antarctic Region, Ocean and Marine Sciences and by this means develop new technologies and new scientific methods.

Establish a scientific station and Republic of Turkey's scientific research vessel study

- Carry out studies for provide Turkey's have a say in future of Arctic regions and act as an interface between researchers in ITU and other universities of Turkey with national or international scientific bodies and authorities,
- Carry out studies for provide that Turkish Arctic and Antarctic Research Programs current studies sustainability,
- Cooperative studies between other countries focus on Arctic, Antarctic Region, Ocean and Marine Sciences and by this means develop new technologies and new scientific methods.

Increase scientific studies which focus on global warming in Arctic and Antarctic regions, international publishing and participation to international scientific platforms

- Affiliate to SCAR (Scientific Committee on Antarctic Research) which is most powerful international research committee in the world, provide sustainability on affiliation and participation,
- Provide a substructure to Turkish scientists for suitable to studies about world climate change focus on Antarctic region,
- Support meetings and studies arranged for protect natural resources in Arctic and Antarctic region,
- Engage in national and international courses, seminars, conferences, congresses and suchlike activities.

Engage training activities

- Carry out trainings intended to raise public awareness about Turkish Arctic and Antarctic Research Programs works,
- Publish reports, bulletins, projects, books, articles, journals and suchlike publications which include solution suggestions and explain scientific and technical findings as results of practices and studies,
- Carry out studies on establish a new main center include laboratories, virtual and interactive presentations, and suchlike visuals. After establishment, obtain endurable management.

== Board of directors ==
- Bilge Tutak (Director)
- tr:Elif Genceli Güner (Vice Director)
- Burcu Özsoy
- Oya Okay
- Hasan Hakan Yavaşoğlu
- Mehmet Ilıcak
- Gülsen Uçarkuş
