= Wuhan Five Rings Sports Center =

Sports venue in Wuhan, China

Wuhan Five Rings Sports Center Stadium 武汉五环体育中心
- Interactive map of Wuhan Five Rings Sports Center Stadium 武汉五环体育中心
- Full name: Wuhan Five Rings Sports Center Stadium 武汉五环体育中心
- Location: Wuhan, Hubei, China
- Coordinates: 30.638927°N 114.128257°E
- Owner: City of Wuhan
- Operator: Kaisa Culture & Sports Group
- Capacity: 30,000
- Surface: Grass
- Public transit: 6 Five Rings Sports Center station

Construction
- Groundbreaking: April 1, 2017
- Built: 2017–2019

Tenant
- Wuhan Zall (2019–2022)

Wuhan Five Rings Sports Center (Chinese: 武汉五环体育中心; pinyin: Wǔhàn Wǔ-Huán Tǐyù Zhōngxīn), formerly known as Dongxihu Sports Center (Chinese: 东西湖体育中心; pinyin: Dōngxīhú Tǐyù Zhōngxīn), is a sports complex located in Dongxihu District, Wuhan, Hubei, China. The complex consists of a 30,000-seat multipurpose stadium, an 8,000-seat gymnasium and a 3,000-seat natatorium. It broke ground on April 1, 2017, and expected to open in March 2019. On December 26, 2018, Shenzhen Kaisa Culture & Sports Group won the operative right of the Sports Center for nine years.
