= Burcu Özsoy =

Turkish scientist

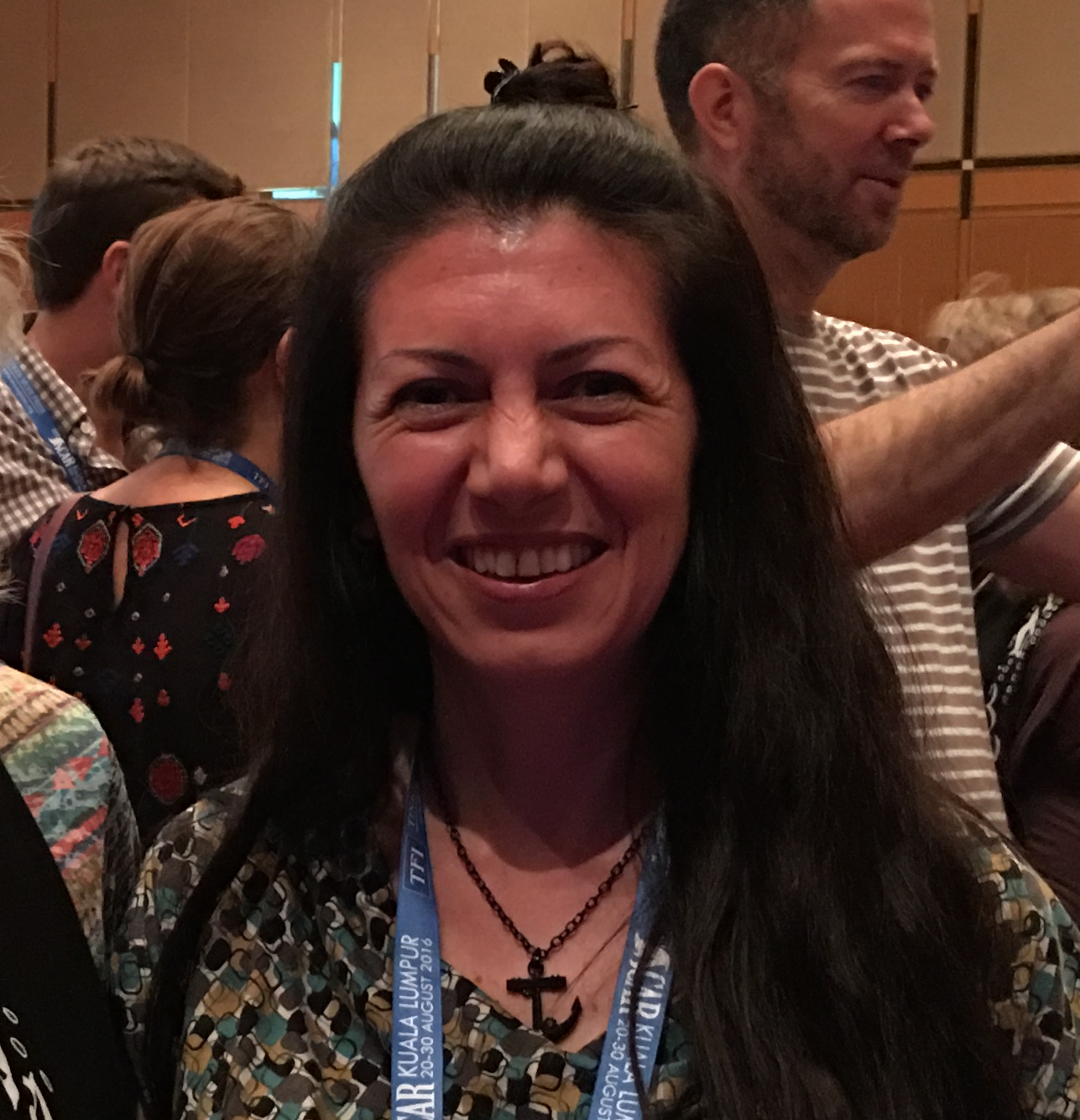
- Burcu Özsoy (August 2016)
- Born: 1976 (age 49–50); Gaziantep, Turkey
- Education: Bachelor and Master Yıldız Technical University, PhD University of Texas at San Antonio
- Known for: Director of (ITU PolReC)
- Awards: ASPRS Mid-South Student Award
- Scientific career
- Fields: Sea ice remote sensing
- Workplaces: Istanbul Technical University Polar Research Center (ITU PolReC)

Burcu Özsoy (born in Gaziantep, Turkey, in 1976) is a Turkish scientist. She is head of the first Turkish polar research center, ITU PolReC, and works with sea ice remote sensing in Antarctica.

== Early life and education ==
Özsoy is a native of Turkey and graduated from Yıldız Technical University with bachelor's and master's degrees in Geodesy-Photogrammetry Engineering.

In 2001, she started serving as a research assistant in Istanbul Technical University. In 2003, she joined the Remote Sensing and Geoinformatics Lab, Department of Geological Sciences at the University of Texas at San Antonio (UTSA).

In 2005, she worked on her PhD at UTSA. During her work there, she met key U.S. and international scientists and institutions, including those who worked at the NASA Goddard Space Flight Center. She was interested in Antarctic remote sensing and traveled to Antarctica in 2006.

In 2007, she established the American Society of Photogrammetry and Remote Sensing (ASPRS) chapter at UTSA. In 2010, Özsoy earned her Ph.D. from UTSA.

== Career ==
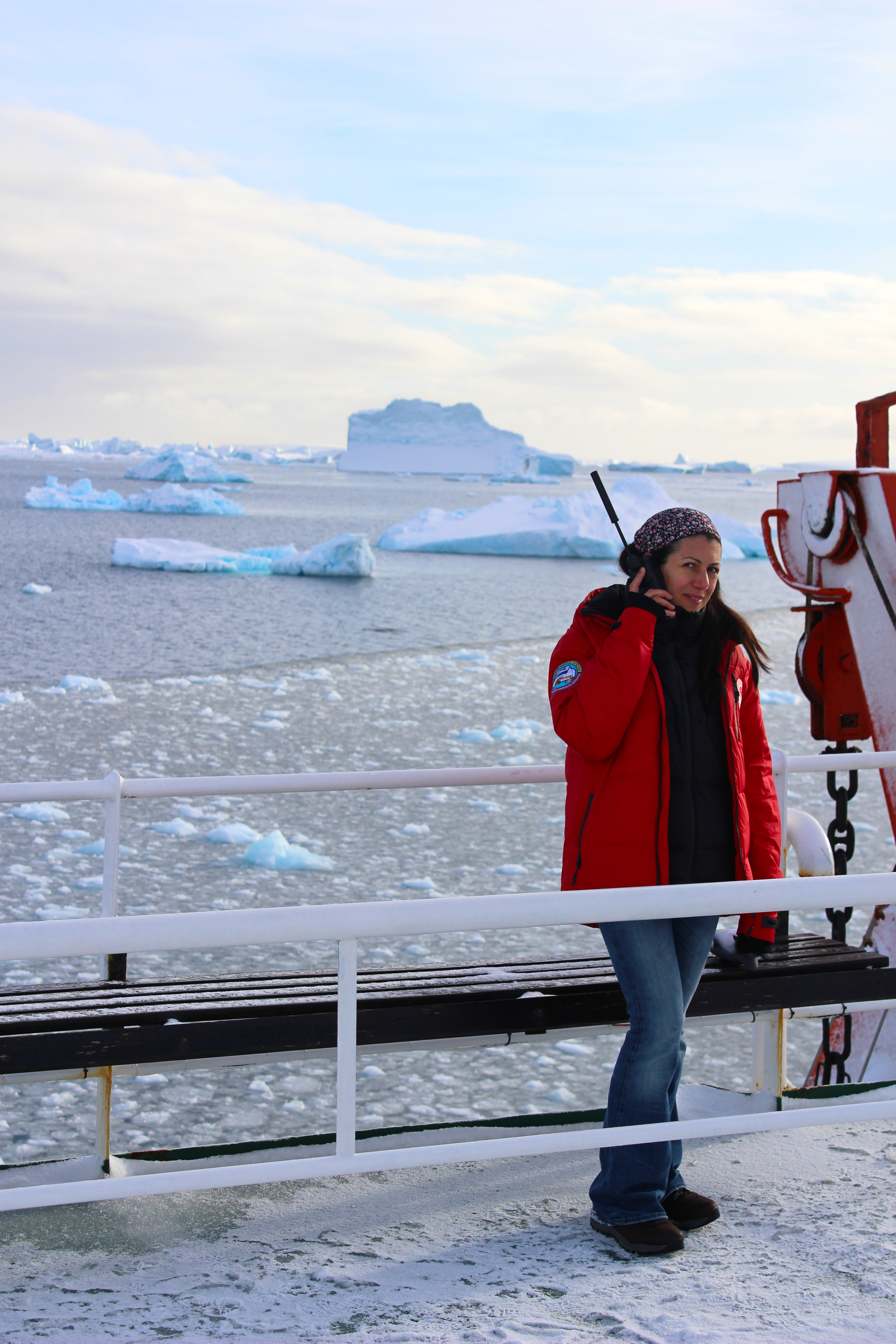
Burcu zsoy during Turkish Antarctic Research Expedition in 2016.

In 2011, Özsoy returned to Turkey and began promoting polar research to combat climate change across multiple disciplines and scientific knowledge levels. Her initiations also spurred public awareness about the importance of the polar regions.

She is the founder and director of Istanbul Technical University Polar Research Center (ITU PolReC), which is in charge of all polar sciences in Turkey.

In 2016, Özsoy was the deputy leader for an Antarctic research expedition. She was one of only two women on the expedition and worked on projects involving climate change. She was also included in the Scientific Committee of International Circumpolar Observatory. She led the first, second and third Turkish Antarctic Expeditions under the auspices of Presidency of Turkey and under the coordination of the Ministry of Industry and Technology and ITU PolReC.

== Awards and honours ==
- 2006, November 10: She got second place at Student Papers/Presentations with the presentation named "Variability of Snow Depth on Sea Ice in Ross Region of Antarctic using AMSR-E/AQUA Geophysical Products", at ASPRS-MAPPS Fall 2006 Conference.
- 2006, November 15: LRSG group exhibited geospatial related works to hundreds of San Antonio school kids at the San Antonio GIS Day led by Ph.D. students Xianwei Wang and Burcu Özsoy.
- 2007, November 16: ASPRS UTSA Chapter and LRSG exhibited geospatial related works to hundreds of San Antonio school kids at the San Antonio GIS Day - Student Day. PhD student Burcu Özsoy led the effort with help from Newfel Mazari and Penny Wagner.
- Burcu Özsoy awarded three IKNOS images from GeoEye Foundation to study Antarctic sea ice and Mt. Erebus volcano.
- 2009, November 19: Burcu Özsoy got first place at the ASPRS Mid-South Student Award for her presentation “Intercomparisons of Antarctic sea ice properties from ship observations, active and passive microwave satellite observations in the Bellingshausen Sea”, at the ASPRS/MAPPS Fall Conference.
- 2014, June: Grant by The Scientific and Technological Research Council of Turkey.

== Selected works ==
- Burcu Ozsoy-Cicek, H. Xie, S. F. Ackley, K. Ye, "Antarctic summer sea ice concentration and extent: comparison of ODEN 2006 ship observations, satellite passive microwave and NIC sea ice charts", The Cryosphere Discussion (TCD), 2009, s. 623–647, doi:10.5194/tc-3-1-2009
- B. Ozsoy-Cicek, S. Kern, S. F. Ackley, H. Xie, A. Tekeli, "Intercomparisons of Antarctic sea properties from ship observations, active and passive microwave satellite observations in the Bellingshausen Sea", Deep Sea Research, Vol. 58, No. 9-10, 2011, s. 1092-1111, ISSN 0967-0645 doi:10.1016/j.dsr2.2010.10.031, Elsevier
- B. Ozsoy-Cicek, "About oil spill detection from RADARSAT-1 Synthetic Aperture Radar imagery at Northern entry of Bosporus Strait, Turkey", Fresenius Environmental Bulletin, Vol. 23, No. 11a, 11/2014, s. 2909-2918, ISSN 1018-4619
- Steer, A., Heil, P., Watson, C., Massom R. A., Lieser J. L., Cicek B. Ö. (2016) Estimating small-scale snow depth and ice thickness from total freeboard for East Antarctic sea ice, Deep Sea Research Part II: Topical Studies in Oceanography, doi:10.1016/j.dsr2.2016.04.025
- Kern, S., B. Ozsoy-Cicek, and A. P. Worby. (2016) Antarctic sea-ice thickness retrieval from ICESat: Inter-comparison of different approaches, Rem. Sens., 8(7), 538, doi:10.3390/rs8070538
- Kern, S., and B. Ozsoy-Cicek (2016) Satellite remote sensing of snow depth on Antarctic sea ice: An inter-comparison of two empirical approaches, Rem. Sens., 8(6), 450, doi:10.3390/rs8060450
- Ozsoy-Cicek, B., S.F Ackley, H Xie, D. Yie, J. Zwally, (2013). Antarctic sea ice thickness from Altimetry: Algorithms based on in situ surface elevation and thickness values. Journal of Geophysical Research – Oceans, Vol, 118, 3807-3822 doi:10.1002/jgrc.20252, 2013
- Kern, S., B. Ozsoy-Cicek, S. Willmess, M. Nicolaus, S.F Ackley, C. Haas, (2011). An intercomparison between AMSR-E snow depth and satellite C- and Ku-Band radar backscatter data for Antarctic sea ice, International Glaciological Society (IGS) – Annals of Glaciology, volume: 52, number: 57, 2011, pg: 279-290
- Ozsoy-Cicek, B., S. Kern, S.F Ackley, H Xie, A. E. Tekeli, (2011). Intercomparisons of Antarctic sea properties from ship observations, active and passive microwave satellite observations in the Bellingshausen Sea, Deep-Sea Research II (2011), doi:10.1016/j.dsr2.2010.10.031, volume: 58, number: 9-10, pages: 1092-1111
