= Gaul Cove =

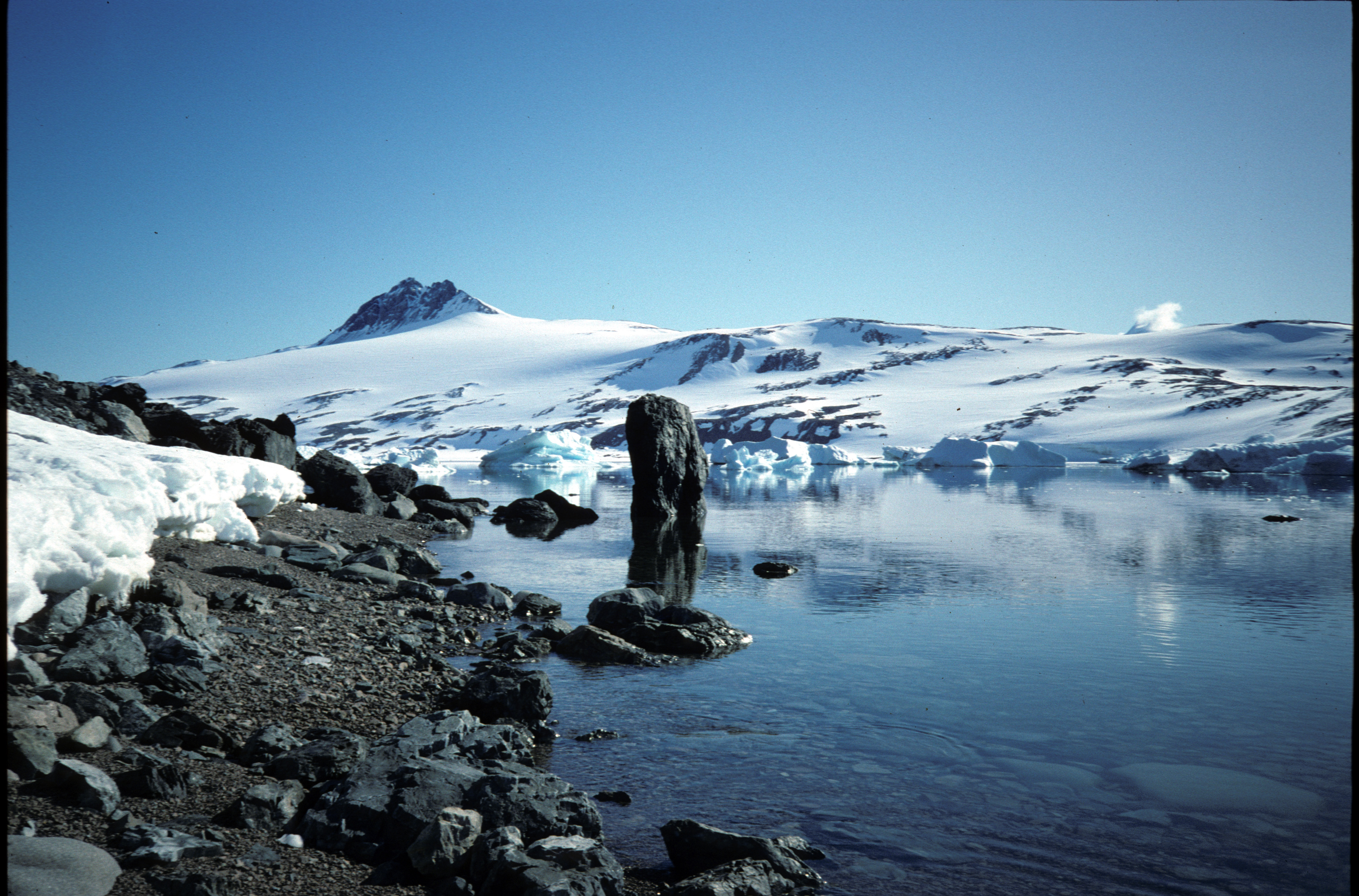
Gaul Cove

Gaul Cove (67°49′S 67°11′W) is a cove indenting the northeast side of Horseshoe Island, off the coast of Graham Land, Antarctica. It was named by the UK Antarctic Place-Names Committee for Kenneth M. Gaul, first leader of the Falkland Islands Dependencies Survey Horseshoe Island station in 1955.

== See also ==
- Russet Pikes
