= Horseshoe Island, Antarctica =

Horseshoe Island
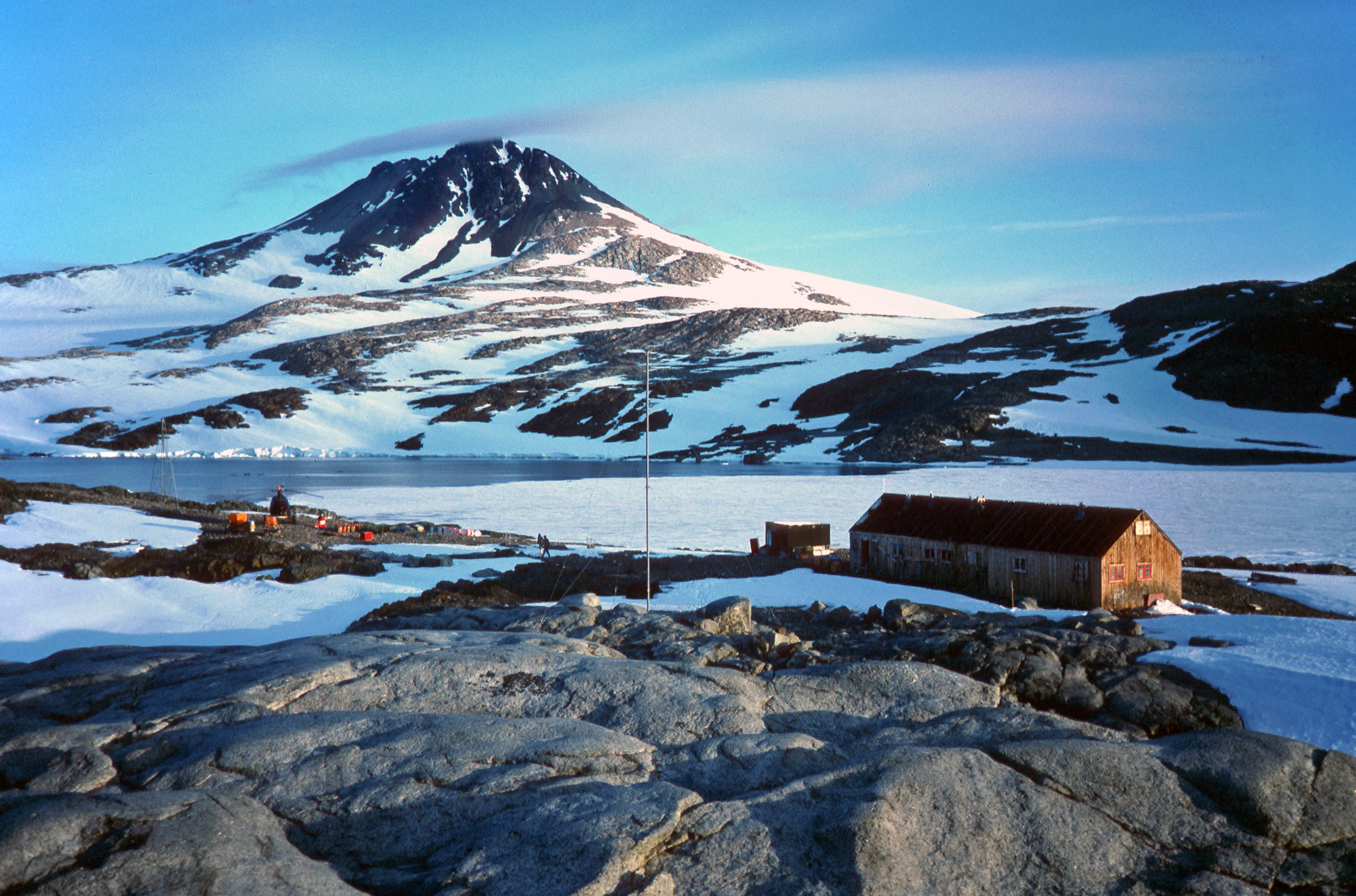
- Base Y (Marguerite Bay) on Horseshoe Island with Mount Searle in the background

- Location within Antarctica

Geography
- Location: Antarctica
- Coordinates: 67°51′S 67°12′W

Administration
- Administered under the Antarctic Treaty System

Horseshoe Island is an island 12 km (6.5 nmi) long and 6 km (3 nmi) wide occupying most of the entrance to Square Bay, along the west coast of Graham Land, Antarctica. It was discovered and named by the British Graham Land Expedition under John Rymill who mapped the area by land and from the air in 1936–37. Its name is indicative of the crescentic alignment of the 600 to 900 m (2,000 to 3,000 ft) peaks which give a comparable shape to the island.

The Turkish Antarctic Research Station is located on the island.

== Base Y ==
Base Y
- Antarctic research station
- Interactive map of Base Y
- Coordinates: 67°48′30″S 67°17′39″W
- Established: 11 March 1955
- Closed: 11 July 1969

Government
  - Type: Administration
  - Body: BAS, United Kingdom
- Active times: All year-round

Lying at the north-western end of the island is Station Y, also known as Horseshoe Base, an inactive but relatively unaltered and completely equipped British research station of the late 1950s. It includes ‘Blaiklock’, a nearby refuge hut. The station was occupied from 11 March 1955 to 21 August 1960, when its personnel were transferred to Stonington Island's Station E. In 1969 it was reopened from 7 March to 11 July to complete local survey work. The site has been designated a Historic Site or Monument (HSM 63) with the name Base Y, following a proposal by the United Kingdom to the Antarctic Treaty Consultative Meeting.

The site has been managed by the UK Antarctic Heritage Trust since 2014.

== See also ==
- List of Antarctic and sub-Antarctic islands
- Crime in Antarctica
- Russet Pikes
