= Gilliamsen Peak =

Peak on Alexander Island, Antarctica

Gilliamsen Peak (71°51′S 70°20′W) is a peak (about 650 m) marking the southeast extremity of the Staccato Peaks in the south portion of Alexander Island, Antarctica. The peak was photographed from the air by Lincoln Ellsworth in 1935. Named by Advisory Committee on Antarctic Names (US-ACAN) after Lieutenant Commander Donald A. Gilliamsen, U.S. Navy, aircraft pilot, Squadron VXE-6, Operation Deep Freeze, 1969 and 1970.

== See also ==
- Copland Peak
- Duffy Peak
- Hageman Peak
