= Borodin (surname) =

Borodin (Russian: Бороди́н), or Borodina (feminine; Бородина́) is a Russian surname. Notable people with the name include:

- Alexander Borodin (1833–1887), Russian composer and chemist
- Alexei Borodin (born 1975), Ukrainian-born professor of mathematics at MIT
- Allan Borodin, American mathematician and computational theorist
- Anastasiia Borodina (born 1982), Ukrainian handball player
- Andrey Borodin (born 1967), former President of Bank of Moscow
- Dmitri Borodin, (born 1977), Russian football goalkeeper
- Dmitry Nikolaevich Borodin (1887–1957), Russian-American entomologist and agronomist
- Ilya Borodin (footballer), (born 1976), Russian footballer
- Ilya Borodin, (born 2003), Russian swimmer
- Ivan Parfenievich Borodin, (1847 - 1930), Russian botanist
- Leonid Borodin (1938–2011), Russian novelist
- Mikhail Borodin (1884–1951), Soviet agent in China
- Nikolai Andreyevich Borodin (1861–1937) Russian born American ichthyologist
- Olga Borodina (born 1963), Russian opera mezzo-soprano
- Pavel Borodin (born 1946), Russian politician, member of Boris Yeltsin's administration
- Piotr Borodin (1905–?), Moldavian politician
- Sergei Borodin (disambiguation), multiple people, including:
  - Sergei Borodin (footballer, born 1988), Russian football player
  - Sergei Borodin (footballer, born 1999), Russian football player
- Tatiana Borodina, Russian opera soprano

== Fictional characters ==
- Kostia Borodin, character from the novel Gorky Park
- Vasily Borodin, executive officer on the submarine Red October in the book and film The Hunt for Red October
