= List of geological features on Miranda =

This is a list of named geological features on Miranda.

== Coronae ==
Mirandan coronae are named after the locations of plays by Shakespeare.

Corona	Named after
Arden Corona	Forest of Arden (As You Like It)
Elsinore Corona	Elsinore (Hamlet)
Inverness Corona	Inverness (Macbeth)

== Craters ==
Mirandan craters are named after male characters in Shakespeare's The Tempest.

Crater	Coordinate	Diameter (km)	Named after
Alonso	44.0°S 352.6°E	25.0	Alonso, King of Naples
Ferdinand	34.8°S 202.1°E	17.0	Ferdinand, Alonso's son
Francisco	73.2°S 236.0°E	14.0	Francisco, a lord of Naples
Gonzalo	11.4°S 77.0°E	11.0	Gonzalo, A lord of Naples
Prospero	32.9°S 329.9°E	21.0	Prospero, the magician
Stephano	41.1°S 234.1°E	16.0	Stephano, the drunken butler
Trinculo	63.7°S 163.4°E	11.0	Trinculo, the jester

This naming scheme results in many Mirandan craters sharing names with other Uranian moons: Ferdinand, Francisco, Prospero, Stephano, and Trinculo.

== Regiones ==
Mirandan regiones are named after the locations of plays by Shakespeare.

Regio	Coordinate	Diameter (km)	Named after
Dunsinane Regio	31.5°S 11.9°E	244.0	Dunsinane Hill (Macbeth)
Ephesus Regio	15.0°S 250.0°E	225.0	Ephesus (The Comedy of Errors)
Mantua Regio	39.6°S 180.2°E	399.0	Mantua (The Two Gentlemen of Verona and Romeo and Juliet)
Sicilia Regio	30.0°S 317.2°E	170.0	Sicily (The Winter's Tale)

== Rupēs ==
Mirandan rupēs are named after the locations of plays by Shakespeare.

Rupes	Named after
Argier Rupes	Algiers (The Tempest)
Verona Rupes	Verona (Romeo and Juliet)

== Sulci ==
Mirandan sulci are named after the locations of plays by Shakespeare.

Sulcus	Named after
Naples Sulcus	Naples (The Tempest)
Syracusa Sulcus	Syracuse (The Comedy of Errors)
