= Borodin (disambiguation) =

Alexander Borodin (1833–1887) was a Russian classical composer, doctor and chemist.

Borodin may also refer to:

- Borodin (surname), Russian surname
- 6780 Borodin, asteroid named after Alexander Borodin
- Mount Borodin, Antarctic mountain
- Borodin Quartet, Russian string quartet
- Borodin Trio, Russian classical music trio

== See also ==
- Boro Din, Christmas in Bangladesh
