= Holst Peak =

Peak on Alexander Island, Antarctica

Holst Peak (71°20′S 70°6′W) is a rocky pyramidal peak, rising to about 1,000 metres (3,300 ft), midway between the south end of the Walton Mountains and the LeMay Range in the central part of Alexander Island, Antarctica. It was first mapped by D. Searle of the Falkland Islands Dependencies Survey in 1960 from air photos obtained by the Ronne Antarctic Research Expedition, 1947–48, and was named by the UK Antarctic Place-Names Committee for Gustav Holst, the English composer.

== See also ==
- Mussorgsky Peaks
- Khufu Peak
- Oberon Peak
