= Drune Hill =

Mountain on Alexander Island, Antarctica

Drune Hill (71°19′S 68°19′W) is a rounded flat topped mountain rising to about 680 metres (2,230 ft), and located about 0.5 nautical miles (1 km) north of Khufu Peak, separated from it by Khufu Corrie, and about 0.5 nautical miles northeast of Pearce Dome, situated on the east coast of Alexander Island, Antarctica. The name is used by those working in the area, however, the origin of the name remains unknown.
