= Blodwen (disambiguation) =

Blodwen is a Welsh female name, and can refer to:

- Blodwen Davies (1897–1966), Canadian writer and historian
- Blodwen, an opera by Joseph Parry
- Blodwen, a character from The Lingo Show, a kids' TV show
- Blodwen Peak, a peak in Antarctica

== See also ==
- "Blodwyn", a song from the Badfinger album No Dice
- Blodwyn Pig, British rock band
- Bodwyn, a village in Anglesey, north Wales
