= Khufu Corrie =

Khufu Corrie (71°19′S 68°19′W) is a cirque roughly 0.3 nautical miles (0.6 km) across formed between Drune Hill to the north and Khufu Peak to the south on the east coast of Alexander Island, Antarctica. It was referred to as the "Fossil Bluff Glacier" in scientific reports in the early 1960s, Fossil Bluff being nearby, and is sometimes referred to today as "Moraine Corrie" and "Moraine Corrie Valley". The name is derived from Khufu Peak.
