= Blodwen Peak =

Peak in Antarctica

Blodwen Peak (71°20′S 68°22′W) is a peak on Alexander Island, the largest island of Antarctica.

Blodwen Peak rises to 914 metres (3,000 ft) situated just over 1 nautical mile (2 km) west-northwest of Khufu Peak and 0.6 nautical miles (1.1 km) west of Pearce Dome, situated on the east coast of Alexander Island, overlooking George VI Sound and the George VI Ice Shelf, Antarctica. It is snow and ice free on the north slopes, and is named for one of the three muskeg tractors used in the area in 1974. It was referred to as "The 2nd Pyramid" in scientific reports in the early 1960s, whilst "The 1st Pyramid" was the nickname given to nearby Giza Peak.

Blodwen Peak is about 3 km south-southwest of the British Fossil Bluff aircraft refuelling station.
