= Inverness Corona =

Youngest corona on Miranda

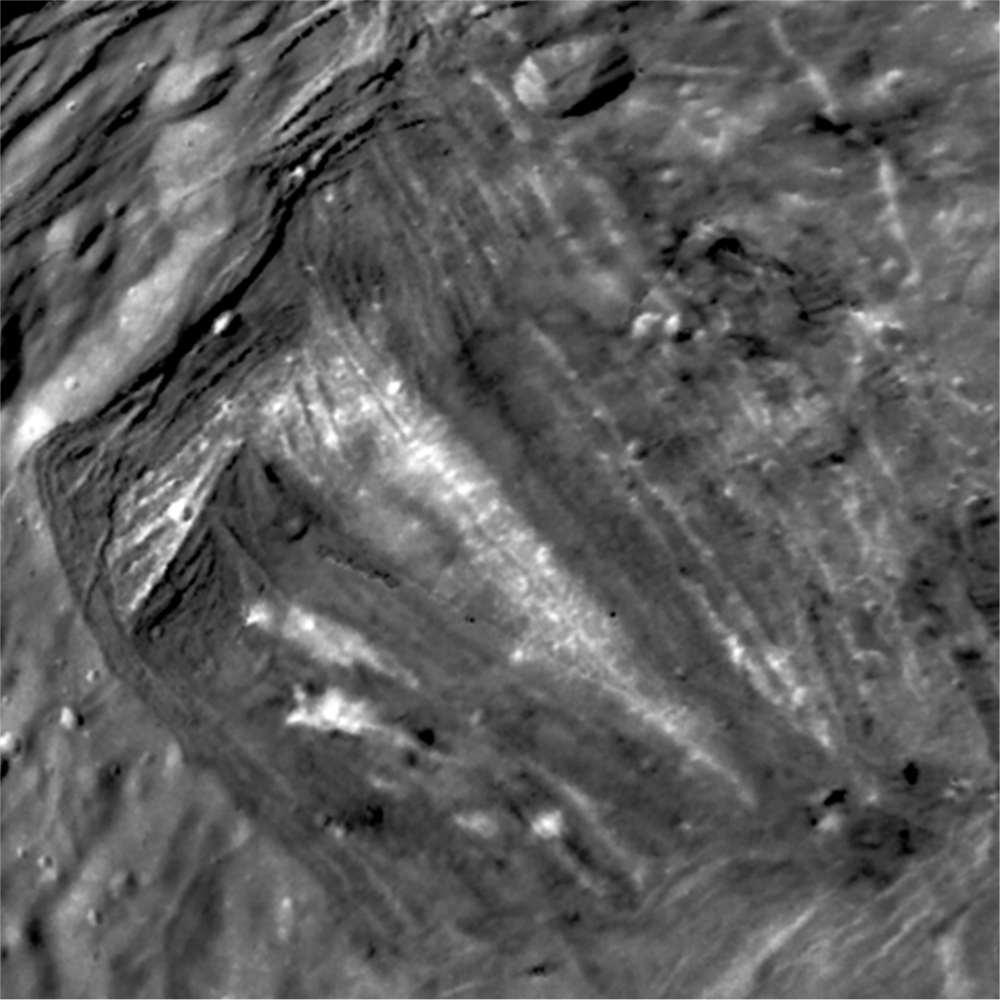
- Voyager 2 image of Inverness Corona, one of the youngest features on Miranda
- Feature type: Corona
- Location: Miranda
- Coordinates: 66.90°S 325.70°E
- Diameter: 234 kilometres (145 mi)
- Discoverer: Voyager 2
- Eponym: Inverness, location of Macbeth's castle

Inverness Corona is a prominent geological feature on Uranus's moon Miranda. Located near Miranda's south pole, it is the youngest of three Mirandan features termed coronae—large oval or polygonal regions that contrast with Miranda's older, cratered terrain. It has a diameter of 234 kilometres (145 mi). This feature is named for the location of Macbeth's castle, Inverness. The area was first examined closely by the spacecraft Voyager 2 in 1986.

== Observation and naming ==
As with the rest of the Uranian system, Miranda and its surface features were imaged up close for the first time by the Voyager 2 spacecraft in 1988, imaging three major coronae on Miranda's surface: Inverness Corona, Arden Corona, and Elsinore Corona. Of the three, only Inverness Corona was viewed in its entirety. The feature is named after Macbeth's castle, Inverness; the name Inverness Corona was adopted by the International Astronomical Union in 1988.

== Geology and characteristics ==
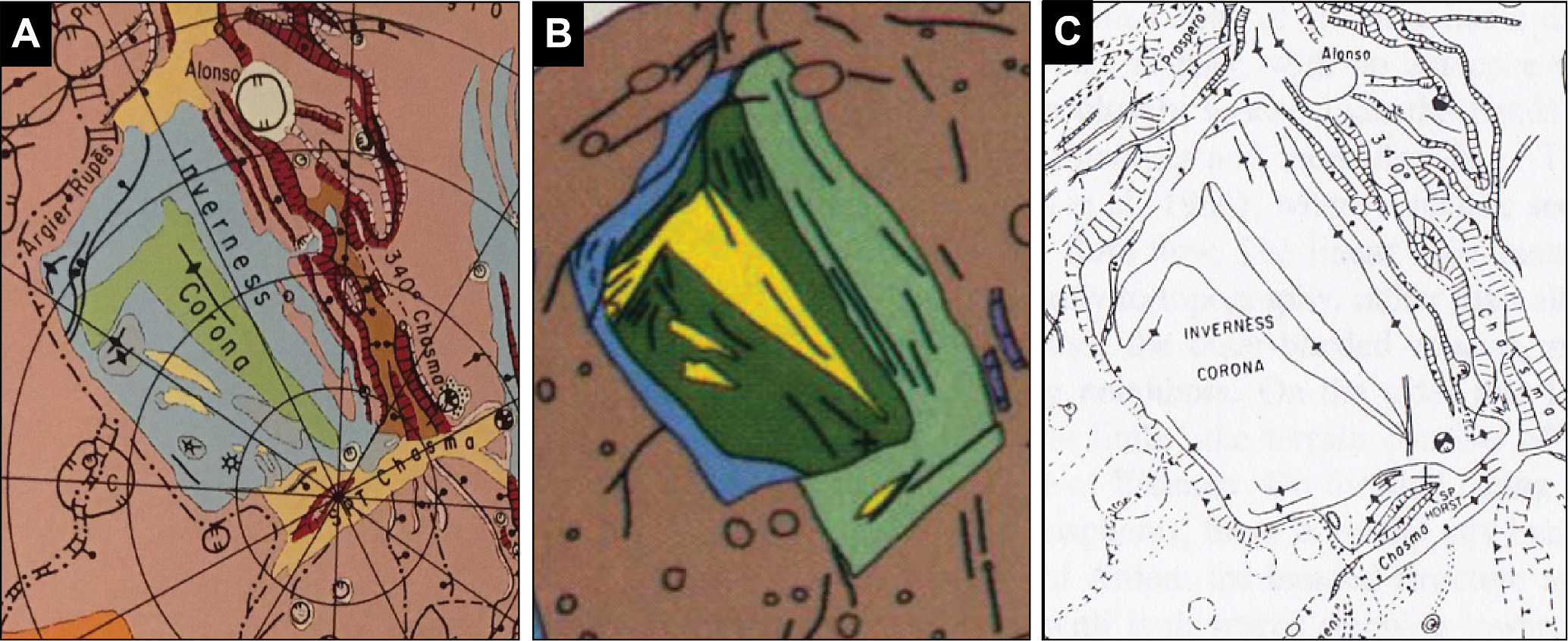
Historical geological maps analyzing Inverness Corona, from left to right: Croft and Soderblom, 1991; Smith et al., 1986; and Greenberg et al., 1991

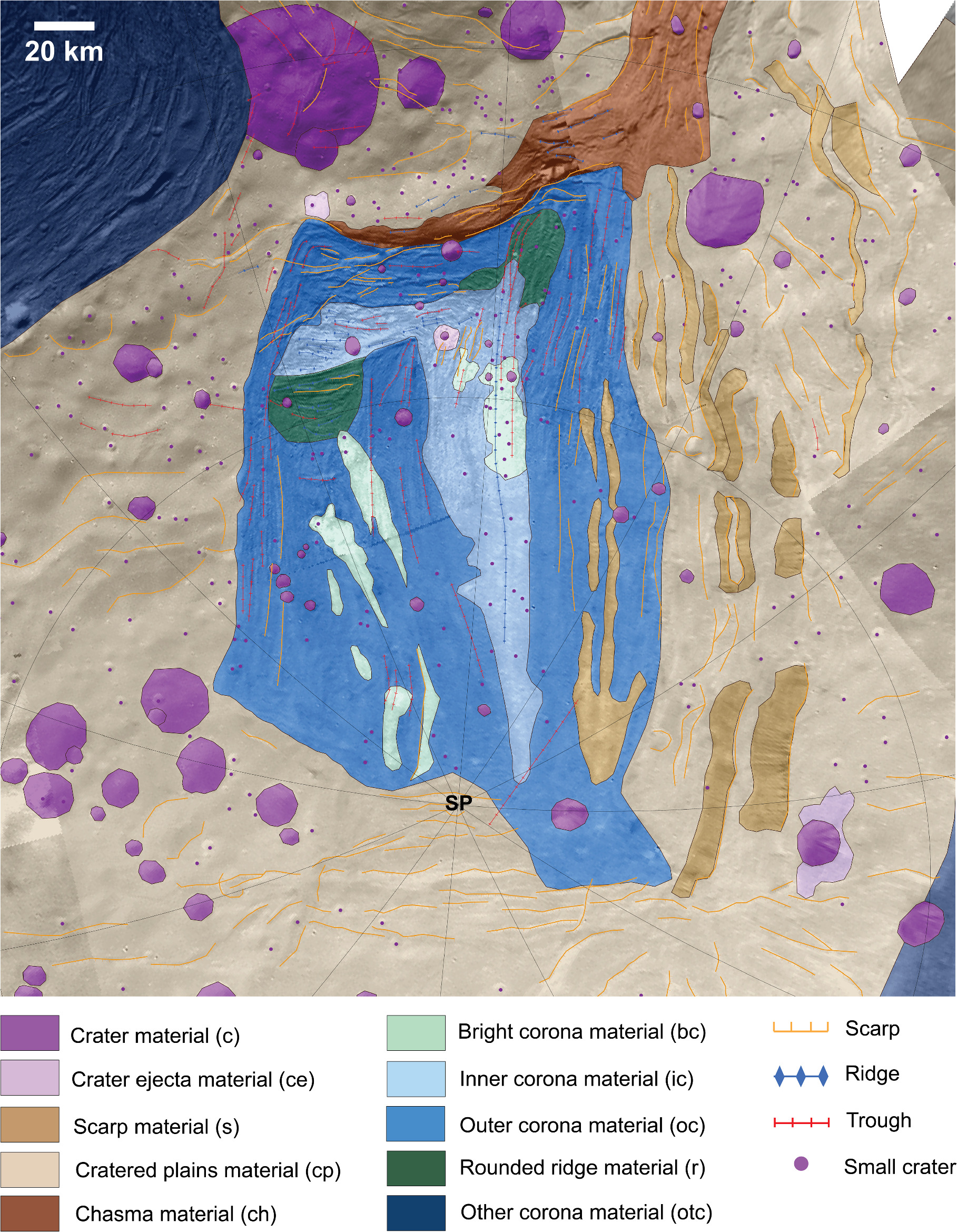
A recent geological map of Inverness Corona as interpreted by Leonard et al., 2023.

Located near Miranda's south pole, Inverness Corona is a roughly trapezoidal-shaped feature with a diameter of roughly 234 kilometers. It shares many similarities with Elsinore Corona and Arden Corona in terms of structural characteristics, including a distinct inner core region ringed by an outer region of concentric linear features and an abrupt boundary with respect to the surrounding older terrain. As with the other two coronae, Inverness Corona is also related to a global-scale network of tectonic rifts; it is directly bound by the rift systems by three sides: one that faces Elsinore Corona, one that faces Silicia Regio, and one that faces Arden Corona. However, several traits distinguish Inverness Corona from the other two coronae. Additionally, Inverness Corona's outer banded zone is much narrower and "mirrors" the characteristics of Elsinore Corona and Arden Corona, whose own banded zones differ from each other. The sides of Inverness Corona's banded zone facing Elsinore Corona mimics the parallel ripples of Elsinore Corona's banded zone. Conversely, the sides roughly facing Arden Corona mimic the characteristics of Arden Corona's banded zone, with concentric fault scarps stepping towards the bounding tectonic rift. Meanwhile, the banded zone is almost entirely absent from the side of Inverness Corona facing Miranda's south pole. Topographically, Inverness Corona is generally depressed relative to surrounding terrain, though significantly elevated relative to major troughs and rifts. Closer to the south pole, some domes and ridges near the altitude of the surrounding cratered plains. Inverness Corona's bright chevron, meanwhile, is surrounded on most of its perimeter by a "lip" several hundreds of meters high.

Inverness Corona is the youngest terrain observed on Miranda, with an estimated surface age of less than 500 million years old. By contrast, Elsinore Corona's estimated surface age is between 400 million and 3.1 billion years old, whilst the cratered plains are estimated to be over 3.4 billion years old. As with the other two coronae, Inverness Corona features a mixture of bright and dark terrain and a very low density of impact craters. The most prominent visual feature within Inverness Corona is the bright "chevron" located within its core region, representing the largest observed high-albedo unit on Miranda. Based upon observations of a tentative bright layer on the face of Verona Rupes and the apparent exposing of bright material by impact craters, the dark surface of Inverness Corona may only be a thin coating of material above a brighter subsurface. Due to Inverness Corona's youth, its features exceptionally pristine, with a team of planetary scientists led by Michelle R. Kirchoff evaluating it as the least degraded terrain unit observed on Miranda. No craters or scarps within Inverness Corona appear to be mantled, or blanketed in deposited material, a trait shared with Elsinore Corona.

=== Origins ===
The coronae have been subject to intense scientific interest; however, focus on the origin of the coronae has been mainly directed to Elsinore Corona and Arden Corona, with little work done for Inverness Corona. Two primary models of coronae formation have arisen since the Voyager 2 flyby: thermally- or compositionally-driven upwelling of material that drives tectonic extension and/or cryovolcanism, or downwelling due to impact events or reaccretion. A team of planetary scientists led by Erin J. Leonard additionally proposed ice-shell thickening as a potential alternative to the two.

Upwelling models argues that rising material within Miranda's interior, either from diapirism or solid-state convection, drove tectonic extension and possibly cryovolcanism on Miranda's surface. Modelling by Noah P. Hammond and Amy C. Barr in 2014 revealed that convection within Miranda's interior is capable of reproducing the observed distribution and deformation pattern of the coronae if the viscosity of Miranda's interior is relatively uniform. The role of cryovolcanism, if any, is unclear; in 1988, Steven K. Croft argued that Inverness Corona was a massive cryovolcanic complex, noting that terrestrial lava flows can create ripples resembling the banded zones of the coronae. The eruptions that created Inverness Corona would have originated from fissures tens to hundreds of kilometers long, erupting viscous cryolava with a viscosity of roughly 10^{7}–10^{8} Pa·s. This interpretation was corroborated by R. Greenberg and collaborators in 1991, who viewed the concentric banding of Inverness as being controlled by the layout of arcuate eruptive vents. However, Erin J. Leonard and collaborators disfavored a cryovolcanic interpretation, noting the lack of observable flow features in Voyager 2 imagery and associating Inverness Corona's bright material as impact ejecta.

Downwelling models include impact-driven formation scenarios; however, an impact is unlikely to have formed Inverness Corona due to its non-circular shape atypical of impact features and the lack of an identifiable ejecta blanket. "Sinker tectonics", proposed by D. M. Janes and H. J. Melosh in 1988, is also unlikely to be responsible for the formation of Inverness Corona due to the lack of observed thrust faults associated with material sinking in Miranda's interior.

Alternatively, Erin J. Leonard and collaborators proposed in 2023 that ice shell thickening could explain the formation of Inverness Corona. In this scenario, the cooling and gradual freezing of Miranda's interior creates extensional stresses. At some point, stresses transition from a distributed regime across the surface to a discrete regime, focusing within smaller regions and creating the coronae. However, ice-shell thickening alone cannot explain the rounded ridges observed, indicating that it may have taken place in conjunction with another mechanism such as diapirism.
