= Pearce Dome =

Mountain on Alexander Island, Antarctica

Pearce Dome (71°19′S 68°20′W) is a dome shaped mountain rising to about 789 m that is snow and ice free on the north slopes and is situated about 0.5 nautical miles (0.9 km) west-northwest of Khufu Peak and 0.6 nautical miles (1.1 km) due east of Blodwen Peak, situated on the east coast of Alexander Island overlooking George VI Sound and the George VI Ice Shelf, Antarctica. The feature was referred to descriptively as The Snow Dome in scientific reports in the early 1960s, and referred to as Dome by those working in the area. Named for C.J. Pearce, a Falkland Islands Dependencies Survey Meteorologist who spent the first winter season (1961) at Fossil Bluff along with B.J. Taylor and J.P. Smith.
