= Mount Alfred (disambiguation) =

Mount Alfred may refer to:

- Mount Alfred, a mountain in Canada
- Mount Alfred (New Zealand)
- Mount Alfred (Antarctica)
