= C30H62 =

The molecular formula C_{30}H_{62} (molar mass: 422.81 g/mol, exact mass: 422.4852 u) may refer to:

- Squalane, branched alkane
- Triacontane, linear alkane
