= Titania Peak =

Peak on Alexander Island, Antarctica

Titania Peak (71°32′S 69°25′W) is a rock peak, rising to about 1,250 metres (4,100 ft), lying near the head of Uranus Glacier, 11 nautical miles (20 kilometres) west-northwest of Mount Umbriel, situated in the central portion of Alexander Island, Antarctica. First mapped from air photos taken by the Ronne Antarctic Research Expedition in 1947–48, by Searle of the Falkland Islands Dependencies Survey in 1960. This feature was named by the United Kingdom Antarctic Place-Names Committee from association with nearby Uranus Glacier, Titania being one of the satellites of the planet Uranus, the seventh planet of the Solar System.it was first climbed in 1970 by Tony Bushell, Ian Sykes and Rod Pashley.

== See also ==
- Copland Peak
- Gilliamsen Peak
- Oberon Peak
