= Richter Peaks =

Peaks in Antarctica

Richter Peaks (71°20′S 70°21′W) is a group of peaks rising to about 1,385 m located near the southern extremity of the Walton Mountains, situated in the central portion of Alexander Island, Antarctica. The peaks were named by Advisory Committee on Antarctic Names for Joseph J. Richter, United States Antarctic Research Program biologist, Palmer Station, 1965–66 and 1966–67.

== See also ==
- Landers Peaks
- Mussorgsky Peaks
- Staccato Peaks
