= Hesperus Nunatak =

Hesperus Nunatak (71°31′S 69°21′W) is a sharp-pointed nunatak lying 2 nautical miles (4 km) southwest of Titania Peak and about 18 nautical miles (33 km) west of Venus Glacier in the southeastern portion of Alexander Island, Antarctica. It was mapped by the Directorate of Overseas Surveys from satellite imagery supplied by the U.S. National Aeronautics and Space Administration in cooperation with the U.S. Geological Survey, and was named by the UK Antarctic Place-Names Committee from association with Venus Glacier, Hesperus being a variant name for the "evening star," Venus.

== See also ==
- Hengist Nunatak
- Lizard Nunatak
- Stephenson Nunatak
