= Dargomyzhsky Glacier =

Glacier in Antarctica

Dargomyzhsky Glacier (71°50′S 70°50′W) is an outlet glacier flowing west from Duffy Peak, in the central portion of the Staccato Peaks, central Alexander Island, Antarctica. The glacier extends across the central portion of Alexander Island and flows into the Bach Ice Shelf. The glacier was probably first photographed by Lincoln Ellsworth on November 23, 1935, and mapped from these photographs by W.L.G. Jeorg. This feature was named by the USSR Academy of Sciences in 1987 after Alexander Dargomyzhsky (1813–1869), Russian composer.
