= Saint George Peak =

Peak on Alexander Island, Antarctica

- Location within Antarctica

Highest point
- Elevation: 1,500 metres (4,900 ft)
- Coordinates: 69°14′S 72°04′W

Geography
- Location: Antarctica

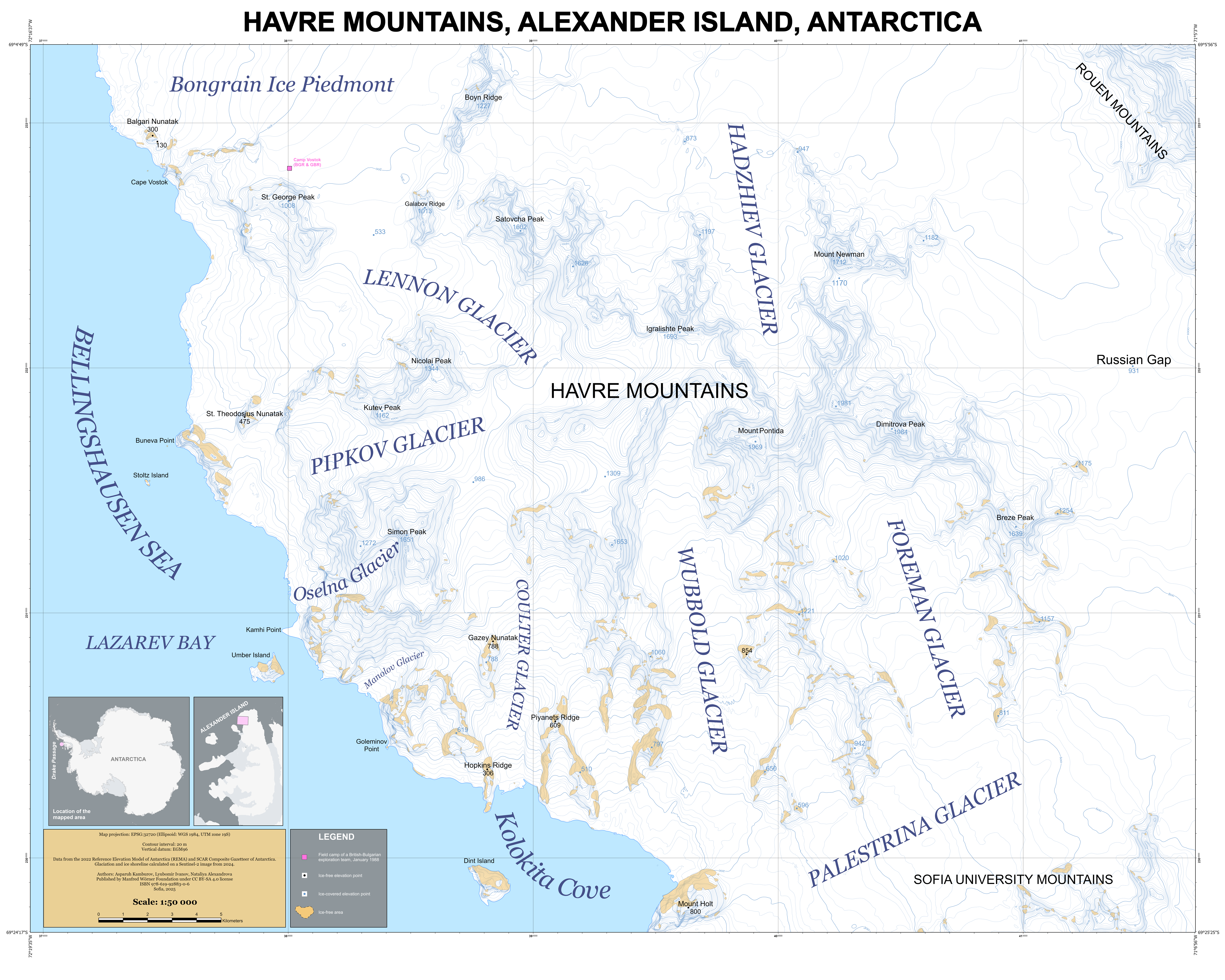
Map of Havre Mountains, Alexander Island in Antarctica

Saint George Peak (Russian: "Gora Svyatogo Georgiya Pobedonostsa") is a peak rising to about 1,500 m in the western part of the Havre Mountains, situated 3 mi northeast of Cape Vostok within the northwest portion of Alexander Island, Antarctica. In 1821 the Russian expedition under Bellingshausen sighted a very high mountain in this area which they named "Gora Svyatogo Georgiya Pobedonostsa" (Mountain of Saint George the Victor). Though the position reported by them for this mountain would place it in the sea, it has been assumed that the peak described here is the same feature. It was first mapped in detail from air photos taken by the RARE, 1947–48, by Searle of the FIDS in 1960. The translated form of the name suggested by the UK-APC was approved in 1961.>

== See also ==
- Duffy Peak
- Giza Peak
- Hageman Peak
