= Sergei Borodin =

Sergei Borodin may refer to:

- Sergei Borodin (footballer, born 1988), Russian football player
- Sergei Borodin (footballer, born 1999), Russian football player
