= Belemnite Valley =

Valley in Antarctica

Belemnite Valley (71°18′S 68°20′W) is a valley in Antarctica, 1.1 nautical miles (2 km) northwest of Fossil Bluff Base and bounded to the north by Eros Glacier. It is mostly snow and ice free with a central meltwater stream. It has been referred to as "Hollow Valley" in scientific reports in the early 1960s, and is sometimes referred to today as "Happy Valley". The name "Belemnite Valley" was proposed due to the preponderance of Belemnites found in the exposed rock in the valley.
