= Oberon Peak =

Nunatak on Alexander Island, Antarctica

Oberon Peak (71°24′S 69°32′W) is an isolated nunatak, rising to about 1,250 m, at the head of Uranus Glacier and 8 nautical miles (15 km) north-northwest of Titania Peak in central Alexander Island, Antarctica. First mapped from air photos taken by the Ronne Antarctic Research Expedition (RARE), 1947–48, by Searle of the Falkland Islands Dependencies Survey (FIDS) in 1960. Named by the United Kingdom Antarctic Place-Names Committee (UK-APC) for its association with nearby Uranus Glacier, Oberon being one of the satellites of Uranus.

== See also ==
- Copland Peak
- Lamina Peak
- Giza Peak
