= Ethelbert Ridge =

Ethelbert Ridge (70°19′S 68°55′W) is a ridge composed of igneous rocks within the Fossil Bluff groups of sedimentary rocks east-southeast of Mount Alfred, on Alexander Island in Antarctica.

It was informally named "Saddleback Ridge" by British Antarctic Survey geologist Alastair Linn, because of its pronounced saddleback appearance when viewed from the south. It was later formally named for Ethelbert, son of Ethelwulf, the Saxon King of the West Saxons and Kentishmen, and effectively King of England from 860–866. This continues the naming of features in the area after Saxon Kings of England.
