= Duffy Peak =

Peak on Alexander Island, Antarctica

Duffy Peak (71°45′S 70°40′W) is a peak southeast of Hageman Peak in the Staccato Peaks, southwest Alexander Island, Antarctica. Dargomyzhsky glacier extends and flows west from the base of Duffy Peak and enters the nearby Bach Ice Shelf. The peak was photographed from the air by Lincoln Ellsworth in 1935, and was named by the Advisory Committee on Antarctic Names for Lieutenant Commander Joseph A. Duffy, a U.S. Navy aircraft pilot in Squadron VXE-6 during Operation Deep Freeze, 1969 and 1970.

== See also ==
- Gluck Peak
- Lamina Peak
- Copland Peak
