= Miranda Peaks =

Peaks on Alexander Island, Antarctica

The Miranda Peaks (71°28′S 68°36′W) are a line of about six peaks trending in a north–south direction on the south side of Uranus Glacier, in eastern Alexander Island, Antarctica. They were photographed by Lincoln Ellsworth on November 23, 1935, in the course of a trans-Antarctic flight and were plotted from the air photos by W.L.G. Joerg. The peaks were named by the UK Antarctic Place-Names Committee from association with Uranus Glacier after Miranda, one of the 31 moons of the planet Uranus, the seventh planet of the Solar System.
