= List of viscosities =

Dynamic viscosity is a material property which describes the resistance of a fluid to shearing flows. It corresponds roughly to the intuitive notion of a fluid's 'thickness'. For instance, honey has a much higher viscosity than water. Viscosity is measured using a viscometer. Measured values span several orders of magnitude. Of all fluids, gases have the lowest viscosities, and thick liquids have the highest. There is evidence of solid flow as result of Brownian motion in condition of extremes such as high temperature, high pressure, and extremely long time scales as theorized for the motion of the Earth's solid metal core.

The values listed in this article are representative estimates only, as they do not account for measurement uncertainties, variability in material definitions, or non-Newtonian behavior.

Kinematic viscosity is dynamic viscosity divided by fluid mass density. This page lists only dynamic viscosity.

== Units and conversion factors ==
For dynamic viscosity, the SI unit is Pascal-second. In engineering, the unit is usually Poise or centiPoise, with 1 Poise = 0.1 Pascal-second, and 1 centiPoise = 0.01 Poise.

For kinematic viscosity, the SI unit is m^2/s. In engineering, the unit is usually Stoke or centiStoke, with 1 Stoke = 0.0001 m^2/s, and 1 centiStoke = 0.01 Stoke.

For liquid, the dynamic viscosity is usually in the range of 0.001 to 1 Pascal-second, or 1 to 1000 centiPoise. The density is usually on the order of 1000 kg/m^3, i.e. that of water. Consequently, if a liquid has dynamic viscosity of n centiPoise, and its density is not too different from that of water, then its kinematic viscosity is around n centiStokes.

For gas, the dynamic viscosity is usually in the range of 10 to 20 microPascal-seconds, or 0.01 to 0.02 centiPoise. The density is usually on the order of 0.5 to 5 kg/m^3. Consequently, its kinematic viscosity is around 2 to 40 centiStokes.

== Viscosities at or near standard conditions ==
Here "standard conditions" refers to temperatures of 25 °C and pressures of 1 atmosphere. Where data points are unavailable for 25 °C or 1 atmosphere, values are given at a nearby temperature/pressure.

The temperatures corresponding to each data point are stated explicitly. By contrast, pressure is omitted since gaseous viscosity depends only weakly on it.

=== Gases ===
==== Noble gases ====
The simple structure of noble gas atoms makes them amenable to accurate theoretical treatment. For this reason, measured viscosities of the noble gases serve as important tests of the kinetic-molecular theory of transport processes in gases (see Chapman–Enskog theory). One of the key predictions of the theory is the following relationship between viscosity $\mu$, thermal conductivity $k$, and specific heat $c_v$:

$$k = f \mu c_v$$

where $f$ is a constant which in general depends on the details of intermolecular interactions, but for spherically symmetric species is very close to $2.5$.

This prediction is reasonably well-verified by experiments, as the following table shows. Indeed, the relation provides a viable means for obtaining thermal conductivities of gases since these are more difficult to measure directly than viscosity.

Substance	Molecular formula	Viscosity (μPa·s)	Thermal conductivity (W m^{−1}K^{−1})	Specific heat (J K^{−1}kg^{−1})	$f \equiv k / (\mu c_v)$	Notes	Refs.
Helium	He	19.85	0.153	3116	2.47		
Neon	Ne	31.75	0.0492	618	2.51		
Argon	Ar	22.61	0.0178	313	2.52		
Krypton	Kr	25.38	0.0094	149	2.49		
Xenon	Xe	23.08	0.0056	95.0	2.55		
Radon	Rn	≈26	≈0.00364	56.2		T = 26.85 °C; $k$ calculated theoretically; $\mu$ estimated assuming $f = 2.5$	

==== Diatomic elements ====
Substance	Molecular formula	Viscosity (μPa·s)	Notes	Ref.
Hydrogen	H_{2}	8.90		
Nitrogen	N_{2}	17.76		
Oxygen	O_{2}	20.64		
Fluorine	F_{2}	23.16		
Chlorine	Cl_{2}	13.40		

==== Hydrocarbons ====
Substance	Molecular formula	Viscosity (μPa·s)	Notes	Ref.
Methane	CH_{4}	11.13	T = 20 °C	
Acetylene	C_{2}H_{2}	10.2	T = 20 °C	
Ethylene	C_{2}H_{4}	10.28	T = 20 °C	
Ethane	C_{2}H_{6}	9.27	T = 20 °C	
Propyne	C_{3}H_{4}	8.67	T = 20 °C	
Propene	C_{3}H_{6}	8.39	T = 20 °C	
Propane	C_{3}H_{8}	8.18	T = 20 °C	
Butane	C_{4}H_{10}	7.49	T = 20 °C	

==== Organohalides ====
Substance	Molecular formula	Viscosity (μPa·s)	Notes	Ref.
Carbon tetrafluoride	CF_{4}	17.32		
Fluoromethane	CH_{3}F	11.79		
Difluoromethane	CH_{2}F_{2}	12.36		
Fluoroform	CHF_{3}	14.62		
Pentafluoroethane	C_{2}HF_{5}	12.94		
Hexafluoroethane	C_{2}F_{6}	14.00		
Octafluoropropane	C_{3}F_{8}	12.44		

==== Other gases ====
Substance	Molecular formula	Viscosity (μPa·s)	Notes	Ref.
Air		18.46		
Ammonia	NH_{3}	10.07		
Nitrogen trifluoride	NF_{3}	17.11	T = 26.85 °C	
Boron trichloride	BCl_{3}	12.3	Theoretical estimate at T = 26.85 °C; estimated uncertainty of 10%	
Carbon dioxide	CO_{2}	14.90		
Carbon monoxide	CO	17.79		
Hydrogen sulfide	H_{2}S	12.34		
Nitric oxide	NO	18.90		
Nitrous oxide	N_{2}O	14.90		
Sulfur dioxide	SO_{2}	12.82		
Sulfur hexafluoride	SF_{6}	15.23		
Molybdenum hexafluoride	MoF_{6}	14.5	Theoretical estimates at T = 26.85 °C	
Tungsten hexafluoride	WF_{6}	17.1	Theoretical estimates at T = 26.85 °C	
Uranium hexafluoride	UF_{6}	17.4	Theoretical estimates at T = 26.85 °C	

=== Liquids ===
==== n-Alkanes ====
Substances composed of longer molecules tend to have larger viscosities due to the increased contact of molecules across layers of flow. This effect can be observed for the n-alkanes and 1-chloroalkanes tabulated below. More dramatically, a long-chain hydrocarbon like squalane (C_{30}H_{62}) has a viscosity an order of magnitude larger than the shorter n-alkanes (roughly 31 mPa·s at 25 °C). This is also the reason oils tend to be highly viscous, since they are usually composed of long-chain hydrocarbons.

Substance	Molecular formula	Viscosity (mPa·s)	Notes	Ref.
Pentane	C_{5}H_{12}	0.224		
Hexane	C_{6}H_{14}	0.295		
Heptane	C_{7}H_{16}	0.389		
Octane	C_{8}H_{18}	0.509		
Nonane	C_{9}H_{20}	0.665		
Decane	C_{10}H_{22}	0.850		
Undecane	C_{11}H_{24}	1.098		
Dodecane	C_{12}H_{26}	1.359		
Tridecane	C_{13}H_{28}	1.724		
Tetradecane	C_{14}H_{30}	2.078		
Pentadecane	C_{15}H_{32}	2.82	T = 20 °C	
Hexadecane	C_{16}H_{34}	3.03		
Heptadecane	C_{17}H_{36}	4.21	T = 20 °C	

==== 1-Chloroalkanes ====
Substance	Molecular formula	Viscosity (mPa·s)	Notes	Ref.
Chlorobutane	C_{4}H_{9}Cl	0.4261		
Chlorohexane	C_{6}H_{11}Cl	0.6945		
Chlorooctane	C_{8}H_{17}Cl	1.128		
Chlorodecane	C_{10}H_{21}Cl	1.772		
Chlorododecane	C_{12}H_{25}Cl	2.668		
Chlorotetradecane	C_{14}H_{29}Cl	3.875		
Chlorohexadecane	C_{16}H_{33}Cl	5.421		
Chlorooctadecane	C_{18}H_{37}Cl	7.385	Supercooled liquid	

==== Other halocarbons ====
Substance	Molecular formula	Viscosity (mPa·s)	Notes	Ref.
Dichloromethane	CH_{2}Cl_{2}	0.401		
Trichloromethane (chloroform)	CHCl_{3}	0.52		
Tribromomethane (bromoform)	CHBr_{3}	1.89		
Carbon tetrachloride	CCl_{4}	0.86		
Trichloroethylene	C_{2}HCl_{3}	0.532		
Tetrachloroethylene	C_{2}Cl_{4}	0.798	T = 30 °C	
Chlorobenzene	C_{6}H_{5}Cl	0.773		
Bromobenzene	C_{6}H_{5}Br	1.080		
1-Bromodecane	C_{10}H_{21}Br	3.373		

==== Alkenes ====
Substance	Molecular formula	Viscosity (mPa·s)	Notes	Ref.
2-Pentene	C_{5}H_{10}	0.201		
1-Hexene	C_{6}H_{12}	0.271		
1-Heptene	C_{7}H_{14}	0.362		
1-Octene	C_{8}H_{16}	0.506	T = 20 °C	
2-Octene	C_{8}H_{16}	0.506	T = 20 °C	
n-Decene	C_{10}H_{20}	0.828	T = 20 °C	

==== Other liquids ====
Substance	Molecular formula	Viscosity (mPa·s)	Notes	Ref.
Acetic acid	C_{2}H_{4}O_{2}	1.056		
Acetone	C_{3}H_{6}O	0.302		
Benzene	C_{6}H_{6}	0.604		
Bromine	Br_{2}	0.944		
Ethanol	C_{2}H_{6}O	1.074		
Glycerol	C_{3}H_{8}O_{3}	1412		
Hydrazine	H_{4}N_{2}	0.876		
Iodine pentafluoride	IF_{5}	2.111		
Mercury	Hg	1.526		
Methanol	CH_{4}O	0.553		
1-Propanol (propyl alcohol)	C_{3}H_{8}O	1.945		
2-Propanol (isopropyl alcohol)	C_{3}H_{8}O	2.052		
Squalane	C_{30}H_{62}	31.123		
Water	H_{2}O	1.0016	T = 20 °C, standard pressure	

=== Aqueous solutions ===
The viscosity of an aqueous solution can either increase or decrease with concentration depending on the solute and the range of concentration. For instance, the table below shows that viscosity increases monotonically with concentration for sodium chloride and calcium chloride, but decreases for potassium iodide and cesium chloride (the latter up to 30% mass percentage, after which viscosity increases).

The increase in viscosity for sucrose solutions is particularly dramatic, and explains in part the common experience of sugar water being "sticky".

Table: Viscosities (in mPa·s) of aqueous solutions at T = 20 °C for various solutes and mass percentages
Solute	mass percentage = 1%	2%	3%	4%	5%	10%	15%	20%	30%	40%	50%	60%	70%
Sodium chloride (NaCl)	1.020	1.036	1.052	1.068	1.085	1.193	1.352	1.557					
Calcium chloride (CaCl_{2})	1.028	1.050	1.078	1.110	1.143	1.319	1.564	1.930	3.467	8.997			
Potassium iodide (KI)	0.997	0.991	0.986	0.981	0.976	0.946	0.925	0.910	0.892	0.897			
Cesium chloride (CsCl)	0.997	0.992	0.988	0.984	0.980	0.966	0.953	0.939	0.922	0.934	0.981	1.120	
Sucrose (C_{12}H_{22}O_{11})	1.028	1.055	1.084	1.114	1.146	1.336	1.592	1.945	3.187	6.162	15.431	58.487	481.561

=== Substances of variable composition ===
Substance	Viscosity (mPa·s)	Temperature (°C)	Reference
Whole milk	2.12	20	
Blood	2 - 9	37	
Olive oil	56.2	29	
Canola oil	46.2	30	
Sunflower oil	48.8	26	
Honey	$\approx$ 2000-10,000	20	
Ketchup (Note: These materials are highly non-Newtonian.)	$\approx$ 5000-20,000	25	
Peanut butter	$\approx$ 10^{4}-10^{6}		
Pitch	2.3×10^{11}	10-30 (variable)	

== Viscosities under nonstandard conditions ==
=== Gases ===
Pressure dependence of the viscosity of dry air at 300, 400 and 500 kelvins

All values are given at 1 bar (approximately equal to atmospheric pressure).

Substance	Chemical formula	Temperature (K)	Viscosity (μPa·s)
Air		100	7.1
Air		200	13.3
Air		300	18.5
Air		400	23.1
Air		500	27.1
Air		600	30.8
Ammonia	NH_{3}	300	10.2
Ammonia	NH_{3}	400	14.0
Ammonia	NH_{3}	500	17.9
Ammonia	NH_{3}	600	21.7
Carbon dioxide	CO_{2}	200	10.1
Carbon dioxide	CO_{2}	300	15.0
Carbon dioxide	CO_{2}	400	19.7
Carbon dioxide	CO_{2}	500	24.0
Carbon dioxide	CO_{2}	600	28.0
Helium	He	100	9.6
Helium	He	200	15.1
Helium	He	300	19.9
Helium	He	400	24.3
Helium	He	500	28.3
Helium	He	600	32.2
Water vapor	H_{2}O	380	12.498
Water vapor	H_{2}O	400	13.278
Water vapor	H_{2}O	450	15.267
Water vapor	H_{2}O	500	17.299
Water vapor	H_{2}O	550	19.356
Water vapor	H_{2}O	600	21.425
Water vapor	H_{2}O	650	23.496
Water vapor	H_{2}O	700	25.562
Water vapor	H_{2}O	750	27.617
Water vapor	H_{2}O	800	29.657
Water vapor	H_{2}O	900	33.680
Water vapor	H_{2}O	1000	37.615
Water vapor	H_{2}O	1100	41.453
Water vapor	H_{2}O	1200	45.192

=== Liquids (including liquid metals) ===
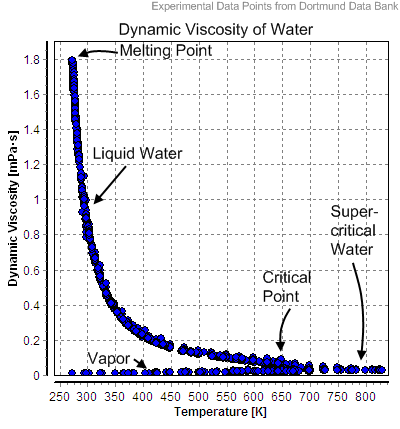
Viscosity of water as a function of temperature

Substance	Chemical formula	Temperature (°C)	Viscosity (mPa·s)
Mercury	Hg	-30	1.958
Mercury	Hg	-20	1.856
Mercury	Hg	-10	1.766
Mercury	Hg	0	1.686
Mercury	Hg	10	1.615
Mercury	Hg	20	1.552
Mercury	Hg	25	1.526
Mercury	Hg	30	1.495
Mercury	Hg	50	1.402
Mercury	Hg	75	1.312
Mercury	Hg	100	1.245
Mercury	Hg	126.85	1.187
Mercury	Hg	226.85	1.020
Mercury	Hg	326.85	0.921
Ethanol	C_{2}H_{6}O	-25	3.26
Ethanol	C_{2}H_{6}O	0	1.786
Ethanol	C_{2}H_{6}O	25	1.074
Ethanol	C_{2}H_{6}O	50	0.694
Ethanol	C_{2}H_{6}O	75	0.476
Bromine	Br_{2}	0	1.252
Bromine	Br_{2}	25	0.944
Bromine	Br_{2}	50	0.746
Water	H_{2}O	0.01	1.7911
Water	H_{2}O	10	1.3059
Water	H_{2}O	20	1.0016
Water	H_{2}O	25	0.89002
Water	H_{2}O	30	0.79722
Water	H_{2}O	40	0.65273
Water	H_{2}O	50	0.54652
Water	H_{2}O	60	0.46603
Water	H_{2}O	70	0.40355
Water	H_{2}O	80	0.35405
Water	H_{2}O	90	0.31417
Water	H_{2}O	99.606	0.28275
Glycerol	C_{3}H_{8}O_{3}	25	934
Glycerol	C_{3}H_{8}O_{3}	50	152
Glycerol	C_{3}H_{8}O_{3}	75	39.8
Glycerol	C_{3}H_{8}O_{3}	100	14.76
Aluminum	Al	700	1.24
Aluminum	Al	800	1.04
Aluminum	Al	900	0.90
Gold	Au	1100	5.130
Gold	Au	1200	4.640
Gold	Au	1300	4.240
Copper	Cu	1100	3.92
Copper	Cu	1200	3.34
Copper	Cu	1300	2.91
Copper	Cu	1400	2.58
Copper	Cu	1500	2.31
Copper	Cu	1600	2.10
Copper	Cu	1700	1.92
Silver	Ag	1300	3.75
Silver	Ag	1400	3.27
Silver	Ag	1500	2.91
Iron	Fe	1600	5.22
Iron	Fe	1700	4.41
Iron	Fe	1800	3.79
Iron	Fe	1900	3.31
Iron	Fe	2000	2.92
Iron	Fe	2100	2.60

In the following table, the temperature is given in kelvins.

Substance	Chemical formula	Temperature (K)	Viscosity (mPa·s)
Gallium	Ga	400	1.158
Gallium	Ga	500	0.915
Gallium	Ga	600	0.783
Gallium	Ga	700	0.700
Gallium	Ga	800	0.643
Zinc	Zn	700	3.737
Zinc	Zn	800	2.883
Zinc	Zn	900	2.356
Zinc	Zn	1000	2.005
Zinc	Zn	1100	1.756
Cadmium	Cd	600	2.708
Cadmium	Cd	700	2.043
Cadmium	Cd	800	1.654
Cadmium	Cd	900	1.403

=== Solids ===
Substance	Viscosity (Pa·s)	Temperature (°C)
granite	3×10^{19} - 6×10^{19}	25
asthenosphere	7.0×10^{19}	900
upper mantle	7×10^{20} – 1×10^{21}	1300–3000
lower mantle	1×10^{21} – 2×10^{21}	3000–4000
