= Giza Peak =

Peak on Alexander Island, Antarctica

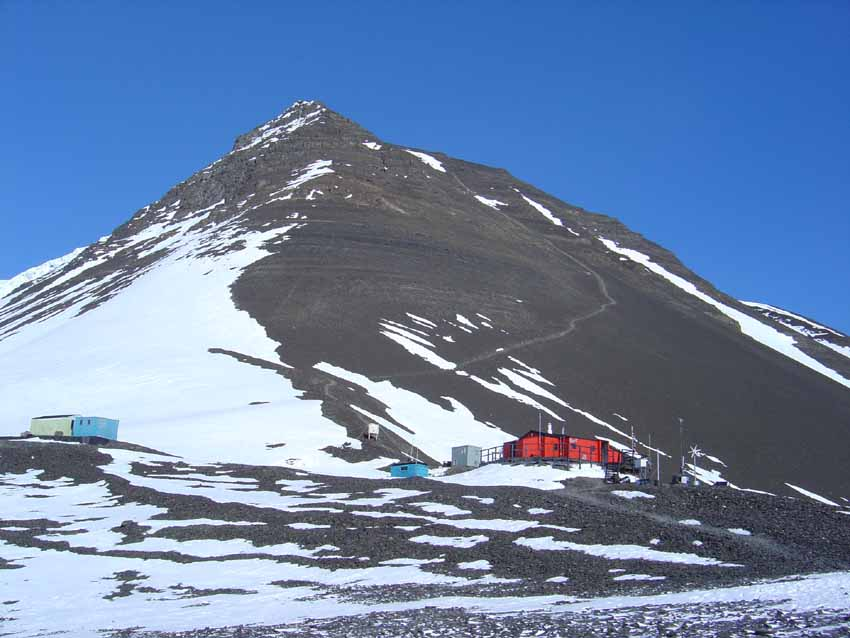
Giza Peak is located in the background of this picture with Fossil Bluff lying at the base of the peak and is seen in the foreground of this image. Eros Glacier lies immediately north of Fossil Bluff, however, it is not visible within this image.

Giza Peak (71°20′S 68°16′W) is a peak rising to about 600 metres (2,000 ft) on the east side of the Fossil Bluff massif, eastern Alexander Island, Antarctica. For many years this peak was known to the British Antarctic Survey (BAS) workers as "Sphinx," a name already in use. To avoid duplication, the UK Antarctic Place-Names Committee in 1987 applied the name Giza Peak to this feature in reference to the site of the colossal statue of the Sphinx at El Giza, Egypt.

== See also ==
- Gluck Peak
- Khufu Peak
- Oberon Peak
