= Giovanni Peak =

Peak on Alexander Island, Antarctica

Giovanni Peak (70°2′S 71°22′W) is a peak rising to about 500 m at the south end of Debussy Heights, above Mozart Ice Piedmont in the north part of Alexander Island, Antarctica.

First mapped from air photos taken by the Ronne Antarctic Research Expedition (RARE), 1947–48, by Searle of the Falkland Islands Dependencies Survey (FIDS) in 1960. Named by United Kingdom Antarctic Place-Names Committee (UK-APC) in association with the Mozart ice piedmont after Mozart's opera Don Giovanni.

== See also ==
- Saint George Peak
- Lamina Peak
- Landers Peaks
