= Miranda (moon) =

Moon of Uranus

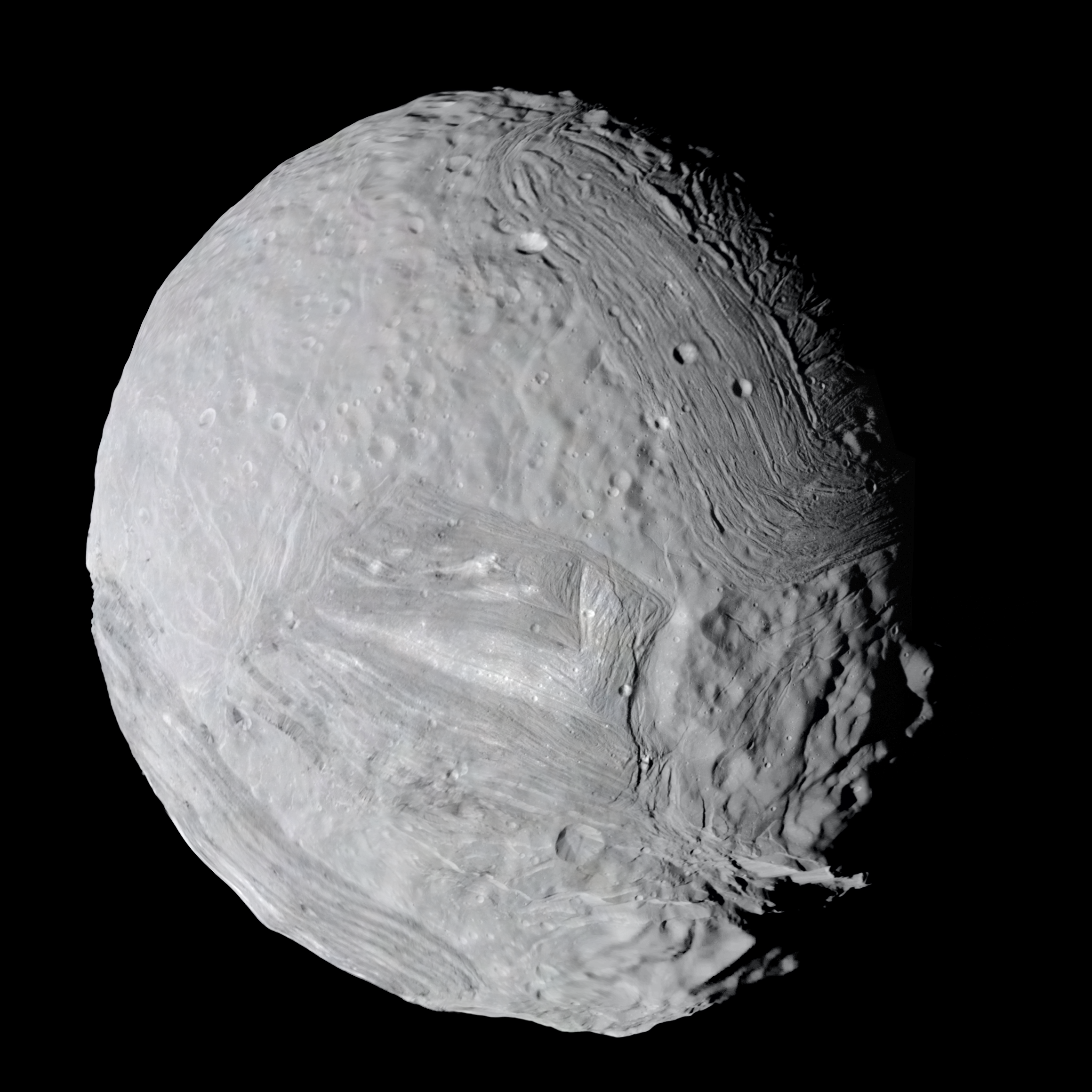
- Assembled mosaic of Miranda using imagery from Voyager 2, January 1986. Large coronae scar Miranda's varied surface, with the bright angular corona at center being Inverness Corona

Discovery
- Discovered by: Gerard P. Kuiper
- Discovery date: February 16, 1948

Designations
- Designation: Uranus V
- Pronunciation: /məˈrændə/
- Adjectives: Mirandan, Mirandian

Orbital characteristics
- Periapsis: 129664 km
- Apoapsis: 130028 km
- Semi-major axis: 129846 km
- Eccentricity: 0.0014
- Orbital period (sidereal): 1.413479 d
- Average orbital speed: 6.68 km/s (calculated)
- Inclination: 4.421° (to Uranus's equator)
- Satellite of: Uranus

Physical characteristics
- Dimensions: 480.8 × 468.4 × 465.8 km (±1.2 × ±1.8 × ^{+2.2}_{−2.6} km)
- Mean radius: 235.8±0.7 km (0.03697 Earths)
- Surface area: (6.987±0.041)×10^{5} km^{2}
- Volume: (5.492±0.049)×10^{7} km^{3}
- Mass: (6.16±0.16)×10^{19} kg (Note: Calculated from its standard gravitational parameter GM = 4.11±0.11 km^{3}/s^{2}.)
- Mean density: 1.12±0.03 g/cm^{3} (calculated)
- Surface gravity: 0.074 m/s^{2}
- Escape velocity: 0.187 km/s
- Synodic rotation period: synchronous
- Axial tilt: ~0°
- Albedo: 0.462 ± 0.006 (geometric); 0.200 ± 0.030 (Bond)
Surface temp.	min	mean	max
solstice	?	≈ 60 K	84±1 K
- Apparent magnitude: 15.78–15.80 (± 0.04) (opposition)
- Absolute magnitude (H): 3.07–3.09 (± 0.04)

Miranda is the smallest and innermost of Uranus's five round satellites. It was discovered by Gerard Kuiper on 16 February 1948 at McDonald Observatory in Texas, and named after Miranda from William Shakespeare's play The Tempest. Like the other large moons of Uranus, Miranda orbits close to its planet's equatorial plane. Because Uranus orbits the Sun on its side, Miranda's orbit is nearly perpendicular to the ecliptic and shares Uranus's extreme seasonal cycle.

At just 470 km (290 mi) in diameter, Miranda is one of the smallest closely observed objects in the Solar System that might be in hydrostatic equilibrium (spherical under its own gravity), and its total surface area is roughly equal to that of the U.S. state of Texas. The only close-up images of Miranda are from the Voyager 2 probe, which made observations of Miranda during its Uranus flyby in January 1986. During the flyby, Miranda's southern hemisphere pointed towards the Sun, so only that part was studied.

Miranda probably formed from an accretion disc that surrounded the planet shortly after its formation and, like other large moons, it is likely differentiated, with an inner core of rock surrounded by a mantle of ice. Miranda has one of the most extreme and varied topographies of any object in the Solar System, including Verona Rupes, a roughly 20-kilometre-high (12 mi) scarp that may be the highest cliff in the Solar System, and chevron-shaped tectonic features called coronae. The origin and evolution of this varied geology, the most of any Uranian satellite, are still not fully understood, and multiple hypotheses exist regarding Miranda's evolution.

== Discovery and name ==
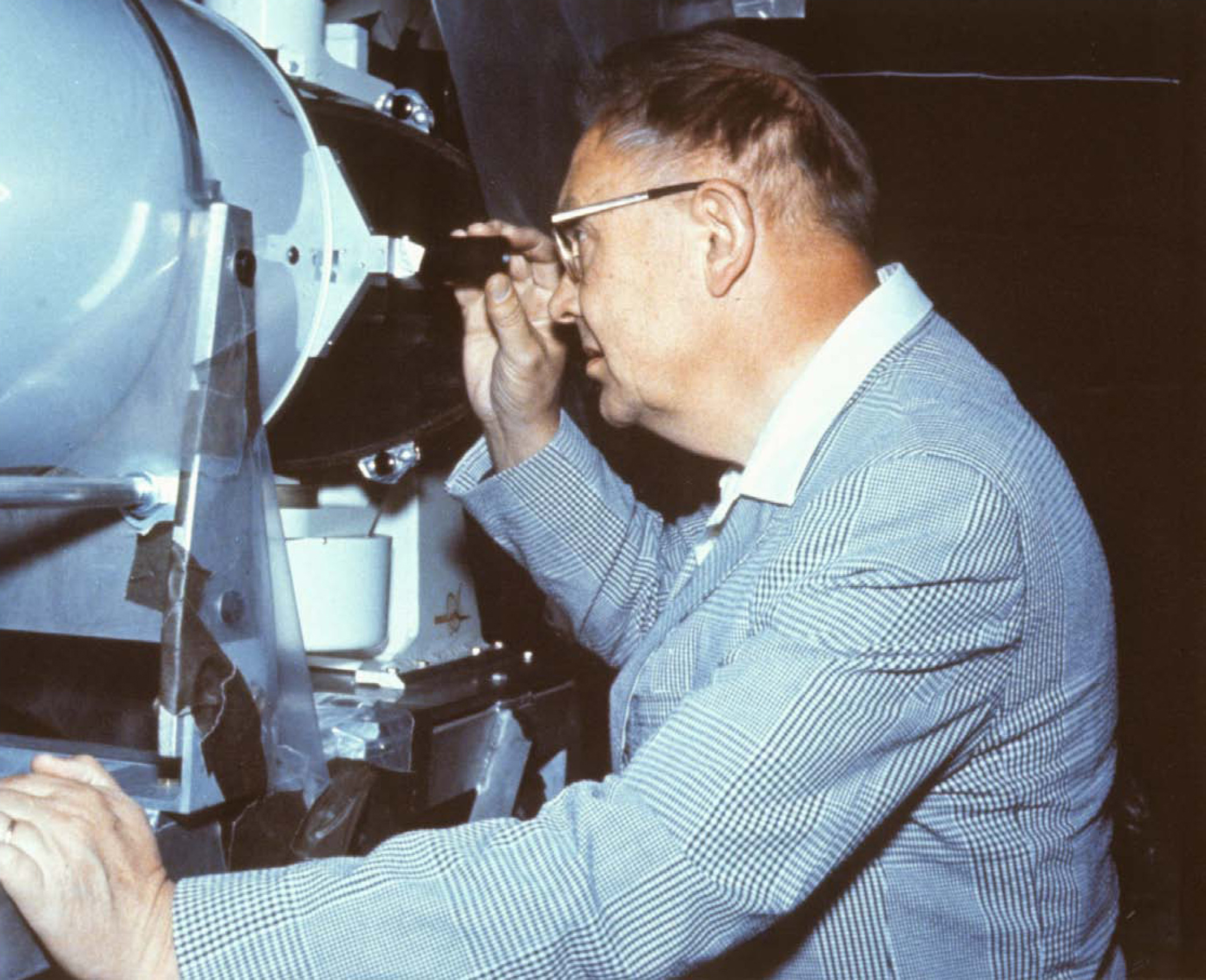
Gerard P. Kuiper, discoverer of Miranda

Miranda was discovered on 16 February 1948 by planetary astronomer Gerard Kuiper using the McDonald Observatory's 82-inch (2,080 mm) Otto Struve Telescope. Its motion around Uranus was confirmed on 1 March 1948. It was the first satellite of Uranus discovered in nearly 100 years. Kuiper elected to name the object "Miranda" after the character in Shakespeare's The Tempest, because the four previously discovered moons of Uranus, Ariel, Umbriel, Titania, and Oberon, had all been named after characters of Shakespeare or Alexander Pope. However, the previous moons had been named specifically after fairies, whereas Miranda was a human. Subsequently discovered satellites of Uranus were named after characters from Shakespeare and Pope, whether fairies or not. The moon is also designated Uranus V.

Planetary moons other than Earth's were never given symbols in the astronomical literature. Denis Moskowitz, a software engineer who designed most of the dwarf planet symbols, proposed an M (the initial of Miranda) combined with the low globe of Jérôme Lalande's Uranus symbol as the symbol of Miranda. This symbol is not widely used.

== Orbit ==
Of Uranus's five round satellites, Miranda orbits closest to it, at roughly 130 000 km from the surface; about a quarter again as far as its most distant ring. It is the round moon that has the smallest orbit around a major planet. Its orbital period is 34 hours and, like that of the Moon, is synchronous with its rotation period, which means it always shows the same face to Uranus, a condition known as tidal locking. Miranda's orbital inclination (4.42°) is unusually high for a body so close to its planet – roughly ten times that of the other major Uranian satellites, and 73 times that of Oberon. The reason for this is still uncertain; there are no mean-motion resonances between the moons that could explain it, leading to the hypothesis that the moons occasionally pass through secondary resonances, which at some point in the past led to Miranda being locked for a time into a 3:1 resonance with Umbriel, before chaotic behaviour induced by the secondary resonances moved it out again. In the Uranian system, due to the planet's lesser degree of oblateness and the larger relative size of its satellites, escape from a mean-motion resonance is much easier than for satellites of Jupiter or Saturn.

== Observation and exploration ==
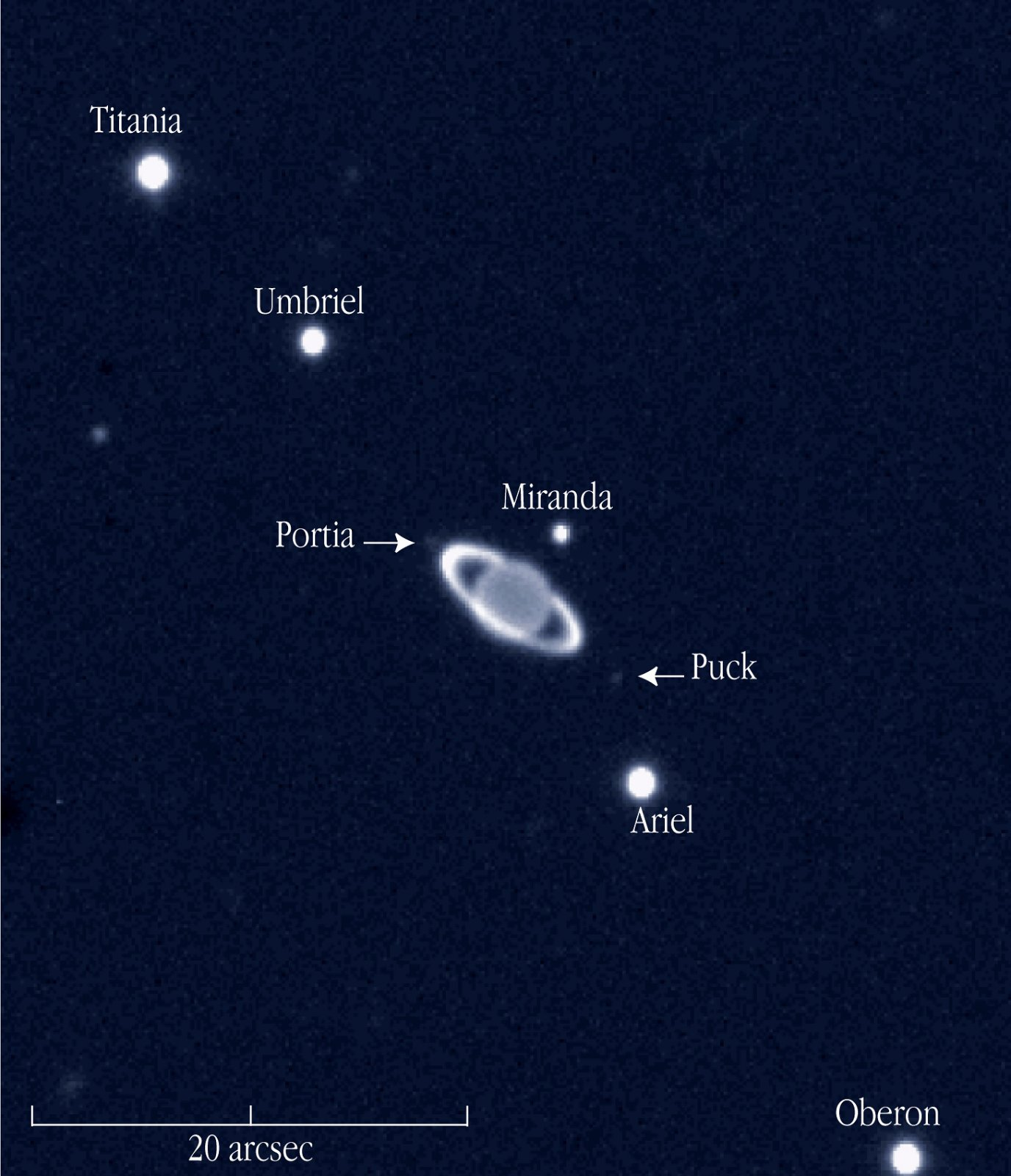
Miranda, Uranus, and its other moons photographed by the Cerro Paranal Observatory.

Miranda's apparent magnitude at opposition peaks at +15.8, making it invisible to many amateur telescopes. Virtually all known information regarding its geology and geography was obtained during the flyby of Uranus made by Voyager 2 on 24 January 1986, The closest approach of Voyager 2 to Miranda was 29,000 km (18,000 mi)—significantly less than the distances to all other Uranian moons. Of all the Uranian satellites, Miranda had the most visible surface. The discovery team had expected Miranda to resemble Mimas, and found themselves at a loss to explain the moon's unique geography in the 24-hour window before releasing the images to the press. In 2017, as part of its Planetary Science Decadal Survey, NASA evaluated the possibility of an orbiter to return to Uranus some time in the 2020s. Uranus was the preferred destination over Neptune due to favourable planetary alignments meaning shorter flight times.

== Composition and internal structure ==
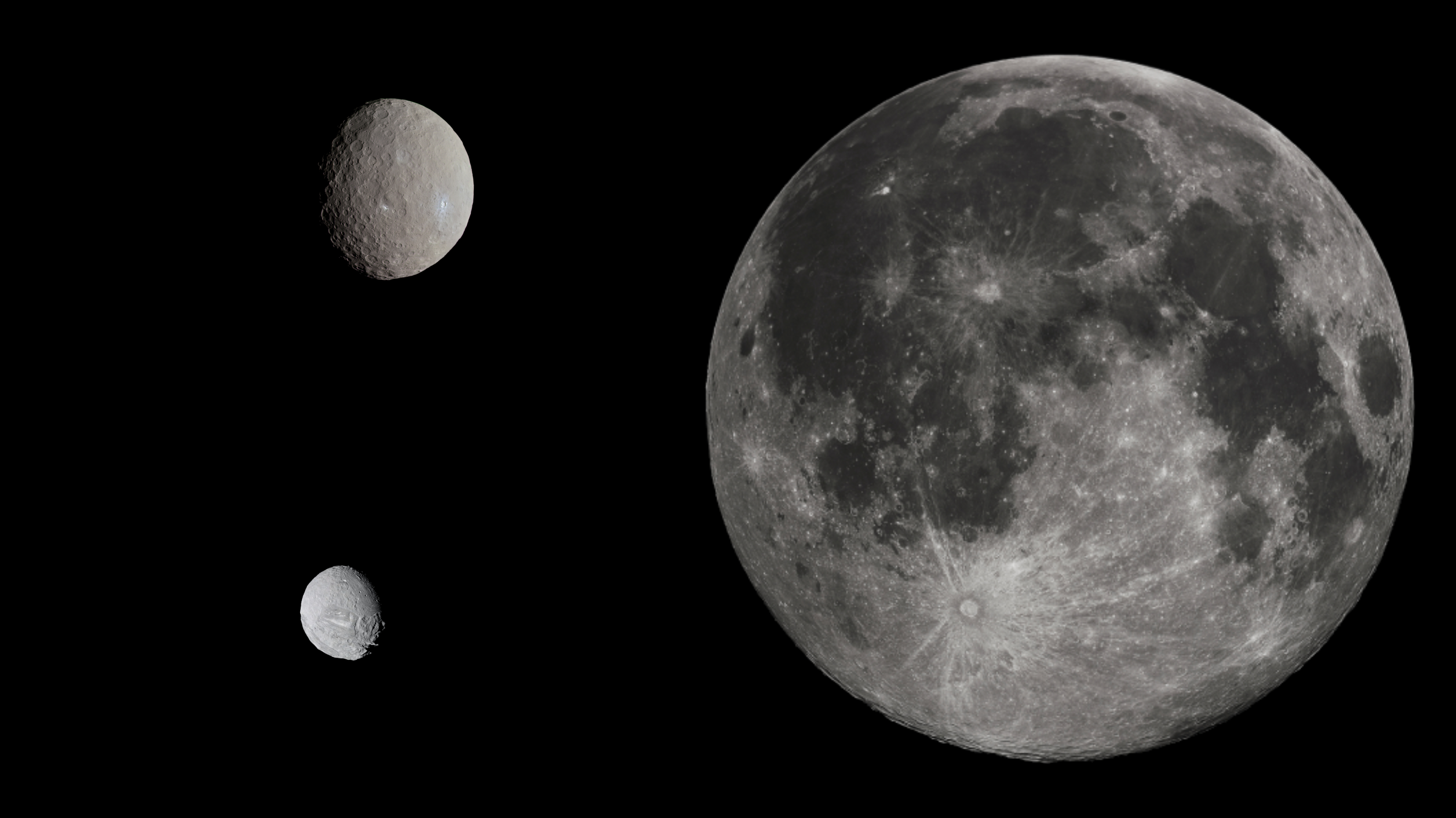
Miranda's size compared to 1 Ceres and the Moon

At 1.12 g/cm^{3}, Miranda is the least dense of Uranus's round satellites. That density suggests a composition of more than 60% water ice. Miranda's surface may be mostly water ice, though it is far rockier than its corresponding satellites in the Saturn system, indicating that heat from radioactive decay may have led to internal differentiation, allowing silicate rock and organic compounds to settle in its interior. Miranda is too small for any internal heat to have been retained over the age of the Solar System. Miranda is the least spherical of Uranus's satellites, with an equatorial diameter 3% wider than its polar diameter. Only water has been detected so far on Miranda's surface, though it has been speculated that methane, ammonia, carbon monoxide or nitrogen may also exist at 3% concentrations. These bulk properties are similar to Saturn's moon Mimas, though Mimas is smaller, less dense, and more oblate. In 2024, Strom et al. conducted geological mapping of Miranda's southern hemisphere based on spatially resolved images from the Voyager 2 fly-by, followed by comparison of the observed geological features to modelling of tidal stress in natural satellites. This study suggested that Miranda might have had a liquid ocean of about 100 km thickness beneath the surface within the last 100–500 million years.

Precisely how a body as small as Miranda could have enough internal energy to produce the myriad of geological features seen on its surface has not been established with certainty, though the currently favoured hypothesis is that it was driven by tidal heating during a past time when it was in 3:1 orbital resonance with Umbriel. The resonance would have increased Miranda's orbital eccentricity to 0.1, and generated tidal friction due to the varying tidal forces from Uranus. As Miranda approached Uranus, tidal force increased; as it retreated, tidal force decreased, causing flexing that would have warmed Miranda's interior by 20 K, enough to trigger melting. The period of tidal flexing could have lasted for up to 100 million years. Also, if clathrate existed within Miranda, as has been hypothesised for the satellites of Uranus, it may have acted as an insulator, since it has a lower conductivity than water, increasing Miranda's temperature still further. Miranda may have also once been in a 5:3 orbital resonance with Ariel, which would have also contributed to its internal heating. However, the maximum heating attributable to the resonance with Umbriel was likely about three times greater.

== Geography ==
Miranda has a unique surface. Among the geological structures that cover it are fractures, faults, valleys, craters, ridges, gorges, depressions, cliffs, and terraces. This moon is a mosaic of highly varied zones. Some areas are older and darker. As such, they bear numerous impact craters, as is expected of a small inert body. Other regions are made of rectangular or ovoid strips. They feature complex sets of parallel ridges and rupes (fault scarps) as well as numerous outcrops of bright and dark materials, suggesting an exotic composition. This moon is most likely composed only of water ice on the surface, as well as silicate rocks and other more or less buried organic compounds.

Main geological structures visible on the known part of Miranda (all named in reference to works by William Shakespeare)
Name	Type	Length (diameter) (km)	Latitude (°)	Longitude (°)	Origin of the name
Mantua Regio	Regiones	399	−39.6	180.2	Italian region of part of the plot of The Two Gentlemen of Verona
Ephesus Regio	Regiones	225	−15	250	The twins' house in Turkey in The Comedy of Errors
Sicilia Regio	Regiones	174	−30	317.2	Italian region of the plot of The Winter's Tale
Dunsinane Regio	Regiones	244	−31.5	11.9	Hill in Scotland at which Macbeth is defeated
Arden Corona	Coronae	318	−29.1	73.7	Forest in England where the plot of As You Like It takes place
Elsinore Corona	Coronae	323	−24.8	257.1	Castle in Denmark that is the setting for Hamlet
Inverness Corona	Coronae	234	−66.9	325.7	Macbeth's castle in Scotland
Argier Rupes	Rupes	141	−43.2	322.8	Region of France where the beginning of the plot of The Tempest takes place
Verona Rupes	Rupes	116	−18.3	347.8	Italian city where the plot of Romeo and Juliet takes place
Alonso	Impact crater	25	−44	352.6	King of Naples in The Tempest
Ferdinand	Impact crater	17	−34.8	202.1	Son of the King of Naples in The Tempest
Francisco	Impact crater	14	−73.2	236	A lord of Naples in The Tempest
Gonzalo	Impact crater	11	−11.4	77	An honest old councilor from Naples in The Tempest
Prospero	Impact crater	21	−32.9	329.9	Legitimate Duke of Milan in The Tempest
Stephano	Impact crater	16	−41.1	234.1	A drunken butler in The Tempest
Trinculo	Impact crater	11	−63.7	163.4	A jester in The Tempest

=== Regiones ===
The regiones identified on the images taken by the Voyager 2 probe are named "Mantua Regio", "Ephesus Regio", "Sicilia Regio", and "Dunsinane Regio". They designate major regions of Miranda where hilly terrain and plains follow one another, more or less dominated by ancient impact craters. Normal faults also mark these ancient regions. Some escarpments are as old as the formation of the regions while others are much more recent and appear to have formed after the coronae. These faults are accompanied by grabens characteristic of ancient tectonic activity. The surface of these regions is fairly uniformly dark. However, the cliffs bordering certain impact craters reveal, at depth, the presence of much more luminous material.

=== Coronae ===
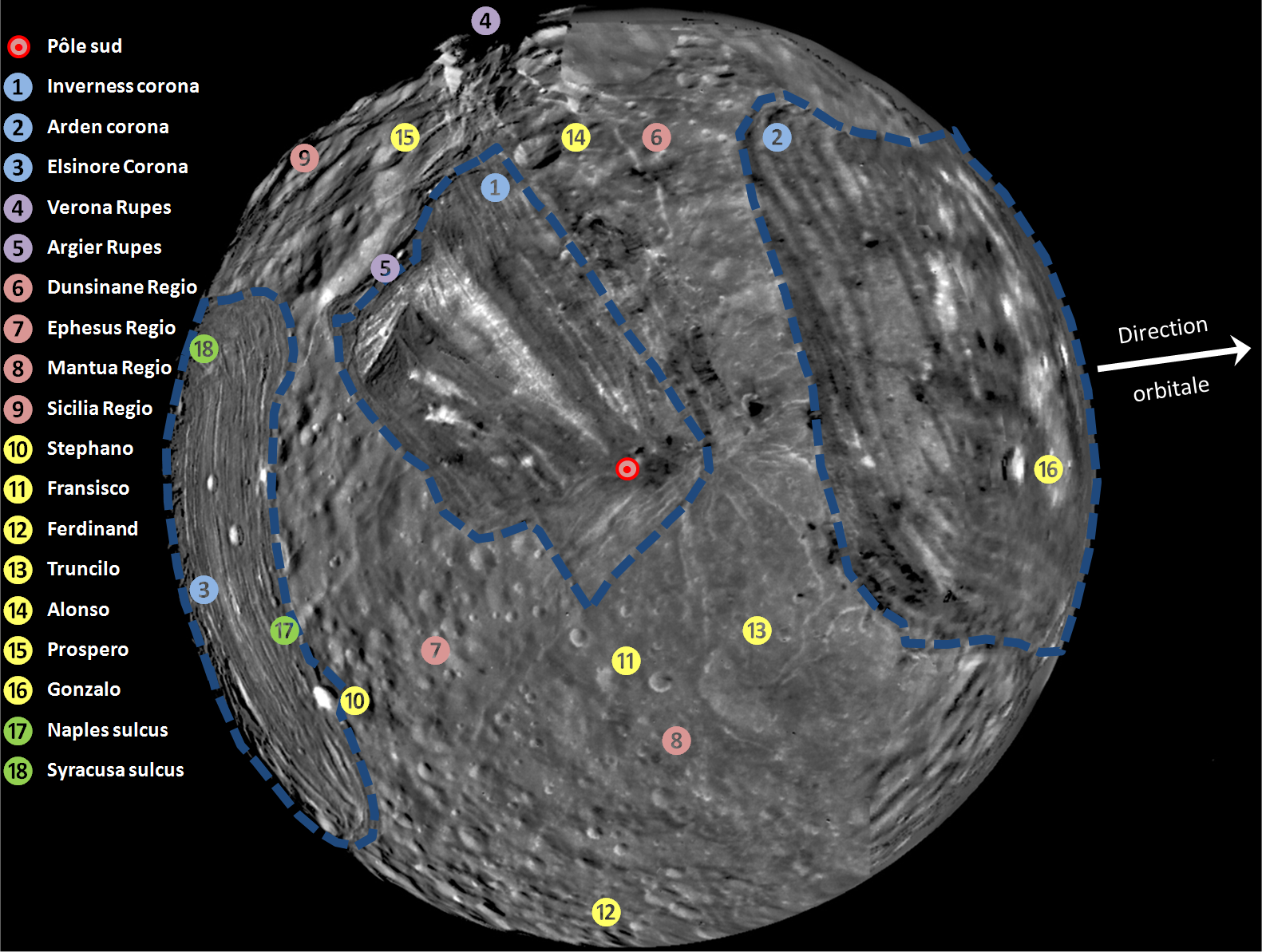
Illustration of the positions of the main geological structures on an image of Miranda

Miranda is one of very few objects in the Solar system to have crowns (also called coronae). The three known coronae observed on Miranda are named Inverness Corona near the south pole, Arden Corona at the apex of the moon's orbital motion, and Elsinore Corona at the antapex. The highest albedo contrasts on Miranda's surface occur within the Inverness and Arden coronae.

==== Inverness Corona ====
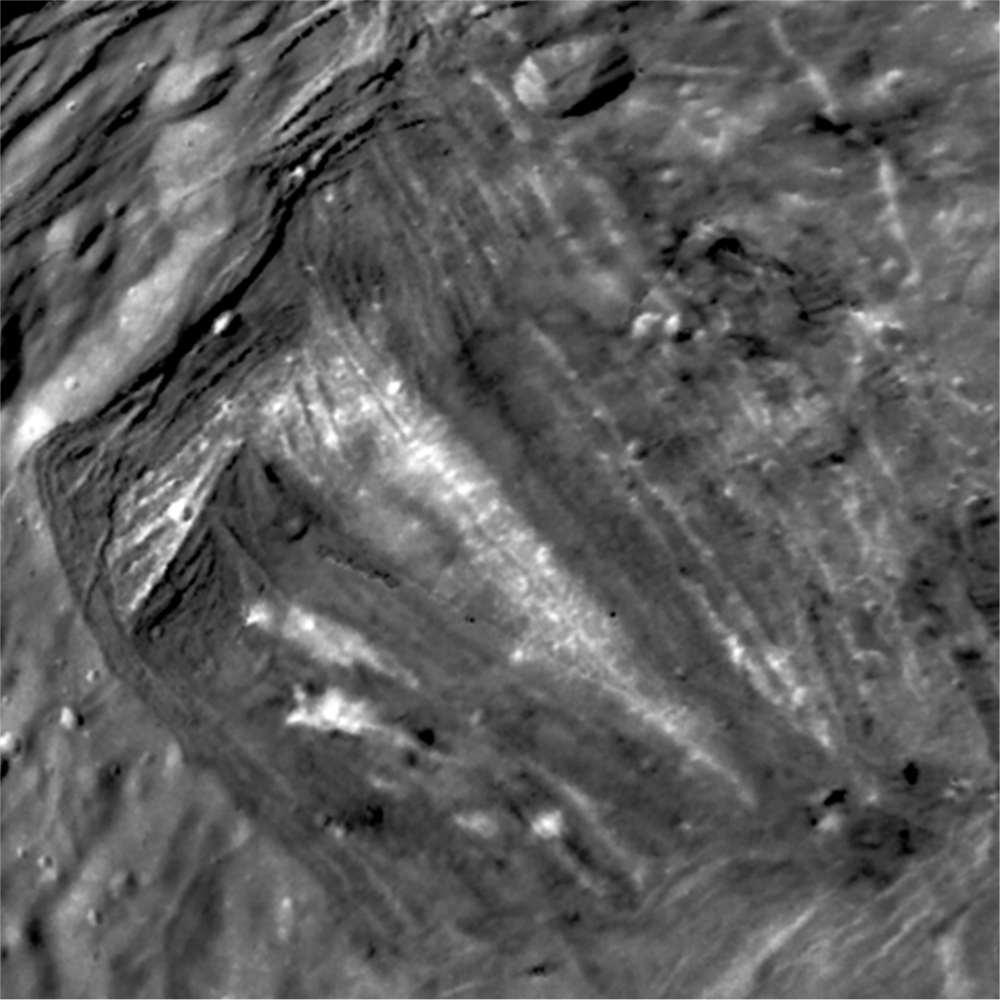
The Inverness Corona is characterized by its white central "chevron". The crater Alonso is visible in the upper right, as well as the cliffs of Argier Rupes in the upper left.

Inverness Corona is a trapezoidal region of approximately 200 km (120 mi) on a side which lies near the south pole. This region is characterized by a central geological structure which takes the shape of a luminous chevron, a surface with a relatively high albedo, and a series of gorges which extend northwards from a point near the pole. At a latitude of around −55°, north-south oriented gorges tend to intersect with others, which follow an east-west direction. The outer boundary of Inverness, as well as its internal patterns of ridges and bands of contrasting albedos, form numerous salient angles. It is bounded on three sides (south, east and north) by a complex system of faults. The nature of the west coast is less clear, but may also be tectonic. Within the crown, the surface is dominated by parallel gorges spaced a few kilometers apart. The low number of impact craters indicates that Inverness is the youngest among the three coronae observed on the surface of Miranda.

==== Arden Corona ====
Arden Corona, present in the front hemisphere of Miranda, extends over approximately 300 km (190 mi) from east to west. The other dimension, however, remains unknown because the terrain extended beyond the terminator (on the hemisphere plunged into night) when Voyager 2 photographed it. The outer margin of this corona forms parallel and dark bands which surround in gentle curves a more clearly rectangular core at least 100 km (62 mi) wide. The overall effect has been described as an ovoid of lines. The interior and belt of Arden show very different morphologies. The interior topography appears regular and soft. It is also characterized by a mottled pattern resulting from large patches of relatively bright material scattered over a generally dark surface. The stratigraphic relationship between the light and dark marks could not be determined from the images provided by Voyager 2. The area at the margin of Arden is characterized by concentric albedo bands which extend from the western end of the crown where they intersect crateriform terrain (near 40° longitude) and on the side east, where they extend beyond the, in the northern hemisphere (near 110° longitude). The contrasting albedo bands are composed of outer fault scarp faces. This succession of escarpments gradually pushes the land into a deep hollow along the border between Arden and the crateriform terrain called Mantua Regio. Arden was formed during a geological episode which preceded the formation of Inverness but which is contemporary with the formation of Elsinore.

==== Elsinore Corona ====
Elsinore Corona is the third corona, which was observed in the rear hemisphere of Miranda, along the terminator. It is broadly similar to Arden in size and internal structure. They both have an outer belt about 100 km (62 mi) wide, which wraps around an inner core. The topography of the core of Elsinore consists of a complex set of intersections of troughs and bumps which are truncated by this outer belt which is marked by roughly concentric linear ridges. The troughs also include small segments of rolling, cratered terrain. Elsinore also presents segments of furrows, called "sulcus", comparable to those observed on Ganymede.

Close-up view of Verona Rupes, a cliff 5 to 20 km (3.1 to 12.4 mi) high.

=== Rupes ===
Miranda also features enormous escarpments that can be traced across the moon. Some of them are older than the coronae, others younger. The most spectacular fault system begins at a deep valley visible at the terminator.

This network of faults begins on the northwest side of Inverness where it forms a deep gorge on the outer edge of the ovoid which surrounds the crown. This geological formation is named "Argier Rupes".

The most impressive fault then extends to the terminator, extending from the top of the central "chevron" of Inverness. Near the terminator, a gigantic luminous cliff, named Verona Rupes, forms complex grabens. The fault is approximately 20 km (12 mi) wide, the graben at the bright edge is 10 to 15 km (9.3 mi) deep. The height of the sheer cliff is 5 to 10 km (6.2 mi). Although it could not be observed by the Voyager 2 probe on the face immersed in the polar night of Miranda, it is probable that this geological structure extends beyond the terminator in the northern hemisphere.

=== Impact craters ===
During the close flyby of Voyager 2 in January 1986, only the craters on the southern hemisphere of Miranda could be observed. They generally had diameters of over 500 m (1,600 ft), representing the limit of resolution of the digital images transmitted by the probe during its flight. These craters have very varied morphologies. Some have well-defined borders and are sometimes surrounded by ejecta deposits characteristic of impact craters. Others are very degraded and sometimes barely recognizable, as their topography has been altered. The age of a crater does not give an indication of the date of formation of the terrain it marked. On the other hand, this date depends on the number of craters present on a site, regardless of their age. The more impact craters a terrain has, the older it is. Scientists use these as "planetary chronometers"; they count observed craters to date the formation of the terrain of inert natural satellites devoid of atmospheres, such as Callisto.

No multiple ring crater, nor any complex crater with a central peak, has been observed on Miranda. Simple craters, that is to say whose cavity is bowl-shaped, and transitional craters (with a flat bottom) are the norm, with their diameter not correlated to their shape. Thus simple craters of more than 15 km (9.3 mi) are observed while elsewhere transitional craters of 2.5 km (1.6 mi) have been identified. Ejecta deposits are rare, and are never associated with craters larger than 15 km (9.3 mi) in diameter. The ejecta that sometimes surround craters with a diameter less than 3 km (1.9 mi) appear systematically brighter than the material surrounding them. On the other hand, ejecta associated with craters of size between 3 km (1.9 mi) and 15 km (9.3 mi) are generally darker than what surrounds them (the albedo of the ejecta is lower than that of the matter surrounding them). Finally, some ejecta deposits, associated with diameters of all sizes, have an albedo comparable to that of the material on which they rest.

==== In regiones ====
In some regiones, and particularly in those of the visible part of the anti-Uranian hemisphere (which continually turns its back on the planet), craters are very frequent. They are sometimes stuck to each other with very little space between each one. Elsewhere, craters are less frequent and are separated by large, weakly undulated surfaces. The rim of many craters is surrounded by luminous material while streaks of dark material are observed on the walls which surround the bottom of the craters. In Matuna Regio, between the craters Truncilo and Fransesco, there is a gigantic circular geological structure of 170 km (110 mi) in diameter which could be a basin impact very significantly degraded. These findings suggest that these regions contain a shiny material at shallow depth, while a layer of dark material (or a material which darkens upon contact with the external environment) is present, at greater depth.

==== In coronae ====
Craters are statistically up to ten times less numerous in the coronae than in the anti-Uranian regions, which indicates that these formations are younger.

The density of impact craters could be established for different areas of Inverness, and made it possible to establish the age of each. Considering these measurements, the entire geological formation was formed in a relative unit of time. However, other observations make it possible to establish that the youngest zone, within this crown, is the one which separates the "chevron", from Argier Rupes.

The density of impact craters in the core and in the Arden belt is statistically similar. The two distinct parts of this formation must therefore have been part of a common geological episode. Nevertheless, the superposition of craters on bands of the central core of Arden indicates that its formation preceded that of the scarps which surround it. The data from the impact craters can be interpreted as follows: the interior and marginal zones of the corona, including most of the albedo bands, were formed during the same period of time. Their formation was followed by later tectonic developments which produced the high-relief fault scarps observed along the edge of the crown near longitude 110°.

The density of impact craters seems the same in the structure surrounding Elsinore as in its central core. The two zones of the crown seem to have formed during the same geological period, but other geological elements suggest that the perimeter of Elsinore is younger than its core.

==== Other observations ====
The number of craters should be higher in the hemisphere at the apex of the orbital movement than at the antapex. However, it is the anti-Uranian hemisphere which is densest in craters. This situation could be explained by a past event having caused a reorientation of Miranda's axis of rotation by 90° compared to that which is currently known. In this case, the paleoapex hemisphere of the moon would have become the current anti-Uranian hemisphere. However, the count of impact craters being limited to the southern hemisphere only, illuminated during the passage of the Voyager 2 probe, it is possible that Miranda has experienced a more complex reorientation and that its paleoapex is located somewhere in the northern hemisphere, which has not yet been photographed.

== Origin and formation ==
Several scenarios are proposed to explain its formation and geological evolution. One of them postulates that it would result from the accretion of a disk of gas and dust called a "subnebula". This sub-nebula either existed around Uranus for some period of time after its formation, or was created following a cosmic impact which would have given its great obliquity to the axis of rotation of Uranus. However, this relatively small moon has areas that are surprisingly young compared to the geological time scale. It seems that the most recent geological formations only date back a few hundred million years. However, thermal models applicable to moons the size of Miranda predict rapid cooling and the absence of geological evolution following its accretion from the subnebula. Geological activity over such a long period cannot be justified either by the heat resulting from the initial accretion, nor by the heat generated by the fission of radioactive materials involved in the formation.

Miranda has the youngest surface among those of the satellites of the Uranian system, which indicates that its geography has undergone the most important evolutions. This geography would be explained by a complex geological history including a still unknown combination of different astronomical phenomena. Among these phenomena would be tidal forces, mechanisms of orbital resonances, processes of partial differentiation, or even movements of convection.

The geological patchwork could be partly the result of a catastrophic collision with an impactor. This event may have completely dislocated Miranda. The different pieces would then have re-assembled, then gradually reorganized in the spherical form that the Voyager 2 probe photographed. Some scientists even speak of several cycles of collision and re-accretion of the moon. This geological hypothesis was depreciated in 2011 in favor of hypotheses involving Uranian tidal forces. These would have pulled and turned the materials present under Inverness and Arden to create fault scarps. The stretching and distortion caused by Uranus's gravity alone could have provided the heat source necessary to power these uprisings.

The oldest known regions on the surface of Miranda are cratered plains such as Sicilia Regio and Ephesus Regio. The formation of these terrains follows the accretion of the moon then its cooling. The bottoms of the oldest craters are thus partially covered with material from the depths of the moon referred to as endogenous resurfacing, which was a surprising observation. The geological youth of Miranda demonstrates that a heat source then took over from the initial heat provided by the accretion of the moon. The most satisfactory explanation for the origin of the heat which animated the moon is the one which also explains the volcanism on Io: a situation of orbital resonance now on Miranda and the important phenomenon of tidal forces generated by Uranus.

After this first geological epoch, Miranda experienced a period of cooling which generated an overall extension of its core and produced fragments and cracks of its mantle on the surface, in the form of grabens. It is indeed possible that Miranda, Ariel, and Umbriel participated in several important resonances involving the pairs Miranda/Ariel, Ariel/Umbriel, and Miranda/Umbriel. Unlike those observed on Jupiter's moon Io, these orbital resonance phenomena between Miranda and Ariel could not lead to a stable capture of the small moon. Instead of being captured, Miranda's orbital resonance with Ariel and Umbriel may have led to the increase in its eccentricity and orbital inclination. By successively escaping several orbital resonances, Miranda alternated phases of heating and cooling. Thus all the known grabens of Miranda were not formed during this second geological episode.

A third major geological epoch occurs with the orbital reorientation of Miranda and the formation of Elsinore and Arden coronae. A singular volcanic event, made of flows of solid materials, could then to have taken place, within the coronae in formation. Another explanation proposed for the formation of these two coronae would be the product of a diapir which would have formed in the heart of the moon. On this occasion Miranda would have at least partially differentiated. Considering the size and position of these coronae, it is possible that their formation contributed to changing the moment of inertia of the moon. This could have caused a 90° reorientation of Miranda. Doubt remains as to the concomitant existence of these two formations. It is possible that at this time, the moon was distorted to the point that its asphericity and eccentricity temporarily caused it to undergo a chaotic rotational movement, such as that observed on Hyperion. If Miranda's orbital reorientation occurred before the two coronae formed on the surface, then Elsinore would be older than Arden. Chaotic movement phenomena generated by the entry into 3:1 resonance between the orbit of Miranda and that of Umbriel could have contributed to an increase in Miranda's orbital inclination greater than 3°.

A final geological episode consists of the formation of Inverness which seems to have induced surface tensions which gave rise to the creation of additional grabens including Verona Rupes and Argier Rupes. Following this new cooling of Miranda, its total volume could have increased by 4%. It is probable that these different geological episodes followed one another without interruption.

Ultimately, Miranda's geological history may have spanned a period of more than 3 billion years. It would have started 3.5 billion years ago with the appearance of heavily cratered regions and ended a few hundred million years ago, with the formation of the coronae.

The phenomena of orbital resonances, and mainly that associated with Umbriel, but also, to a lesser extent, that of Ariel, would have had a significant impact on the orbital eccentricity of Miranda, and would also have contributed to the internal heating and geological activity of the moon. The whole would have induced convection movements in its substrate and allowed the start of planetary differentiation. At the same time, these phenomena would have only slightly disturbed the orbits of the other moons involved, which are more massive than Miranda. However, Miranda's surface may appear too tortured to be the sole product of orbital resonance phenomena.

After Miranda escaped from this resonance with Umbriel, through a mechanism that likely moved the moon into its current, abnormally high orbital tilt, the eccentricity would have been reduced. The tidal forces would then have erased the eccentricity and the temperature at the heart of the moon. This would have allowed it to regain a spherical shape, without allowing it to erase the impressive geological artifacts such as Verona Rupes. This eccentricity being the source of the tidal forces, its reduction would have deactivated the heat source which fueled the ancient geological activity of Miranda, making it a cold and inert moon.

== See also ==
- List of geological features on Miranda
