= Hageman Peak =

Peak on Alexander Island, Antarctica

Hageman Peak (71°43′S 70°48′W) is a montane landform pinnacle rising to about 940 metres (3,100 ft) at the northwest end of the Staccato Peaks in southern Alexander Island, Antarctica. The peak was photographed from the air by Lincoln Ellsworth in 1935, and was named by the Advisory Committee on Antarctic Names for Lieutenant Commander Roger H. Hageman, U.S. Navy, an LC-130 aircraft commander during Operation Deep Freeze, 1969.

== See also ==
- Saint George Peak
- Beagle Peak
- Giovanni Peak
