= Gluck Peak =

Mountain in Alexander Island, Antarctica

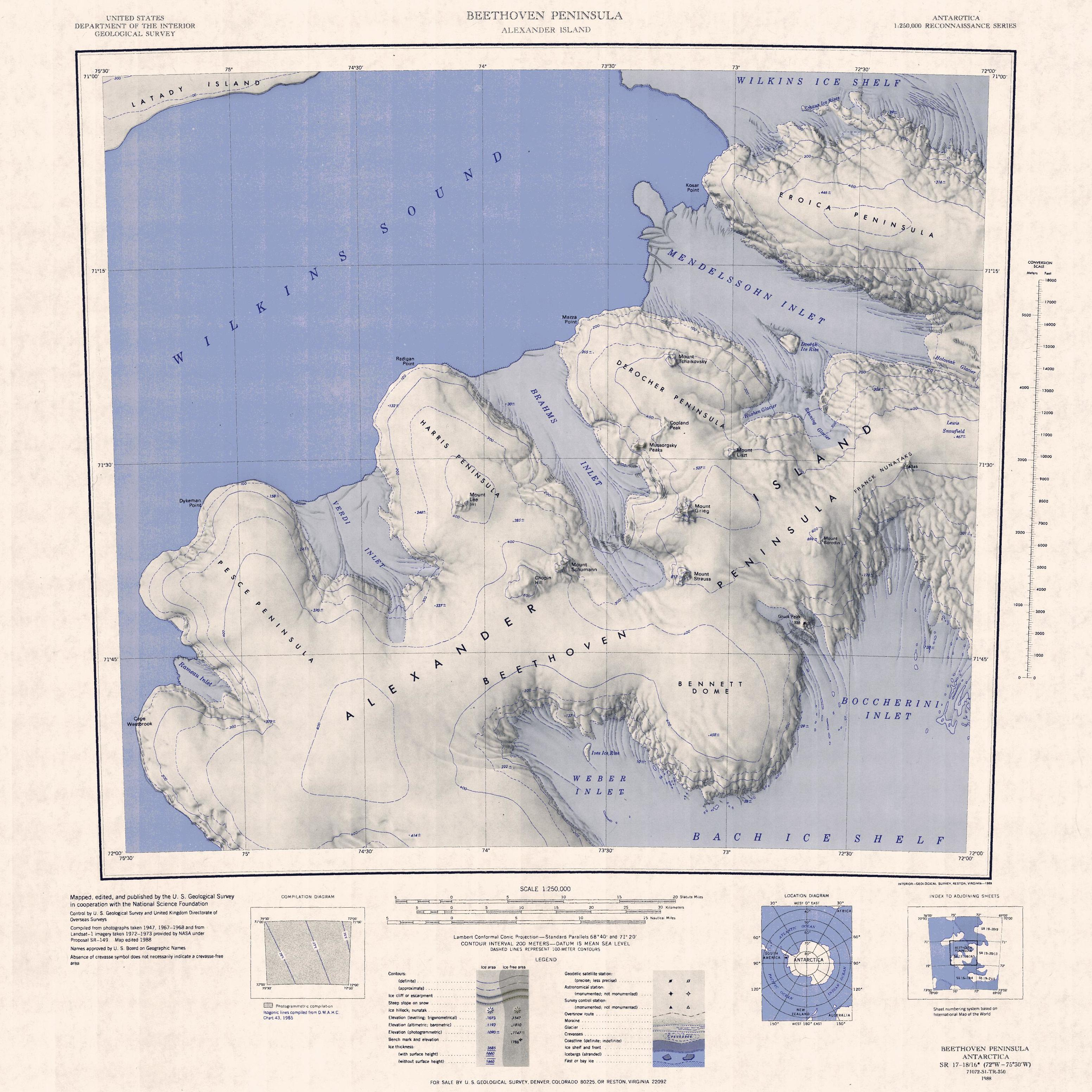
Gluck Peak

Gluck Peak (71°42′S 72°41′W) is a rock peak, 335 metres (1,100 ft) high, located 6.5 nautical miles (12 km) south-southwest of Mount Borodin and immediately north of Alyabiev Glacier, lying between the bases of Bennett Dome and Shostakovich Peninsula on south side of the Beethoven Peninsula, southwest Alexander Island, Antarctica. It was first mapped — from air photos taken by the 1947–48 Ronne Antarctic Research Expedition — by D. Searle of the Falkland Islands Dependencies Survey in 1960, and was named by the UK Antarctic Place-Names Committee after Christoph Willibald von Gluck, the Austrian composer (1714-1787).

== See also ==
- Holst Peak
- Ravel Peak
- Simon Peak
