= Mount Borodin =

Mountain in Antarctica

- Location within Antarctica

Highest point
- Elevation: 695 m (2,280 ft)
- Coordinates: 71°36′S 72°38′W

Geography
- Location: Beethoven Peninsula, Alexander Island, Antarctica

Mount Borodin (71°36′S 72°38′W) is a mainly ice-covered mountain, 695 metres (2,280 ft) high, with a rock outcrop on the east side, 7 nautical miles (13 km) north-northeast of Gluck Peak in the southwest part of Alexander Island, Antarctica. A number of peaks in this general vicinity first appear on the maps of the Ronne Antarctic Research Expedition (RARE), 1947–48. This peak, apparently one of these, was mapped from RARE air photos by Derek J.H. Searle of the Falkland Islands Dependencies Survey in 1960, and named by the UK Antarctic Place-Names Committee after Alexander Borodin, the Russian composer.
