= Mount Alfred (Antarctica) =

Mountain on Alexander Island, Antarctica

Mount Alfred (70°18′S 69°14′W) is an ice-capped mountain, more than 2,000 m, 5.5 nautical miles (10 km) inland from George VI Sound and 8 nautical miles (15 km) south of Mount Athelstan in the Douglas Range of Alexander Island, Antarctica. It was first photographed from the air on November 23, 1935, by Lincoln Ellsworth and mapped from these photos by W.L.G. Joerg. Its east face was roughly surveyed in 1936 by the British Graham Land Expedition (BGLE) and resurveyed in 1948 and 1949 by the Falkland Islands Dependencies Survey (FIDS), which named it for Alfred, Saxon king of England, 871–899. The west face of the mountain was mapped from air photos taken by the Ronne Antarctic Research Expedition (RARE), 1947–48, by Searle of the FIDS in 1960.

== See also ==
- Ethelbert Ridge
