= Dmitry Nikolaevich Borodin =

Soviet agronomist (1887–1957)

Dmitry Nikolaevich Borodin (Russian: Дмитрий Николаевич Бородин; 23 November 1887 – 16 June 1957) was a Russian entomologist and agronomist who moved to the United States of America from where he collaborated with Nikolai Vavilov and other Soviet scientists.

== Biogrpahy ==
Borodin was born in Uralsk, Orenberg Governorate, the son of ichthyologist Nikolai Andreevich Borodin and Lydia Sergeevna. Many in the family of Ural Cossacks were in the military and in 1899 the family moved to St Petersburg where the father served in the fisheries department. Borodin studied at the Karl May Gymnasium and joined the University of St Petersburg in 1906. His contemporaries included Boris Uvarov and he graduated in 1910 and studied entomology at the University of Heidelberg under Professor Otto Büchli. He worked at the Poltava Agricultural Station headed the entomological department from 1914.

During World War I he was mobilized into the Ural Cossack division and was wounded in 1915 at Podbor. In 1917 he was a Commissioner of the Ural Police and served in the white troops on the eastern front. He was seriously wounded and was evacuated from Novorossiysk with his wife and two children aboard the Bukovina to Yugoslavia.

He moved to Bulgaria and at the end of 1920 reached the USA aboard the Saxony from Cherbourg. From 1921 he worked at the University of California. In 1921 he met Nikolai Vavilov who was visiting and helped organize an exchange of books, livestock, and seeds between the US and the USSR. Vavilov helped set up a Russian Agricultural Bureau with a New York Branch under Borodin and a publication called the Review of American Agriculture was produced. Borodin was removed from the position in 1927. Borodin also helped Nikolai Roerich in the 1920s.

His sister Tatyana Nikolaevna was arrested on 20 September 1937 and executed by the NKVD under article 58-10-11 on 4 October 1937. He worked for sometime at Columbia University, showing an interest in "Yarovization" (or vernalization). His memoirs were published posthumously under the title From the Ural Steppes: 1914-1920.
