= Tatiana Borodina =

Russian opera soprano

Tatiana Borodina is a Russian opera soprano.

== Biography ==
Borodina was born in Perm. She graduated from the Perm Musical College and Saint Petersburg Conservatory in 2000.

She was a prize winner at the Young Voices of East: International Competition of Singers (Rome, 1997) and at the International Rimsky-Korsakov Vocal Competition (St. Petersburg, 1998).

She joined the Mariinsky Theatre in 1998 and in 1999 made her debut there in the role of Elsa (Lohengrin, Wagner).

She has toured with the Kirov Opera in:

- Italy (Ravenna Festival, La Scala)
- London (Covent Garden)
- China
- Finland
- the Netherlands
- Salzburg Festival
- Israel
- Japan (Tokyo, November 2003)
- Germany (Baden-Baden, Der Ring des Nibelungen, December/January 2003/2004), (Staatstheater Wiesbaden Maifestspiele 2006)
- USA (Washington, January 2005)

She worked with conductors: Josep Caballé-Domenech, Christoph Eschenbach, Valery Gergiev, Michael Güttler, Gianandrea Noseda, Donato Renzetti, Thomas Sanderling, Yuri Temirkanov.

== Repertoire ==
=== Opera ===
- Cio-Cio-San (Madama Butterfly, Puccini)
- Desdemona ('Otello, Verdi)
- Elisabetta (Don Carlos, Verdi)
- Elsa (Lohengrin, Richard Wagner)
- Freia (Das Rheingold, Wagner)
- Fiordilidgi (Cosi fan tutte, Mozart)
- Halka (Halka, Moniuszko)
- Iolanthe (Iolanthe, Tchaikovsky)
- Kupava (The Snow Maiden, Rimsky-Korsakov)
- La Contessa (Le nozze di Figaro, Mozart)
- Liù (Turandot, Puccini)
- Lisa (Picque Dame, Tchaikovsky)
- Fevronia (The Legend of the Invisible City Kitezh and Maiden Fevronia, Rimsky-Korsakov)
- Maddalena (Andrea Chénier, Umberto Giordano)
- Maria (Mazeppa, Tchaikovsky)
- Marguérite (Faust, Gounod)
- Mimi (La bohème, Puccini)
- Nedda (Pagliacci, Leoncavallo)
- Olga (Rusalka, Dargomizhsky)
- Suor Angelica (Il Trittico, Puccini)
- Tatiana (Evgeny Onegin, Tchaikovsky)
- Wolchowa (Sadko, Rimsky-Korsakov)
- Xenia (Boris Godunov, Mussorgsky)

=== Concert ===
- Beethoven (Symphonie Nr. 9, Ode an die Freude)
- Dvořák (Requiem)
- Mozart (Requiem)
- Poulenc (Gloria)
- Rachmaninov (The Bells)
- Saint-Saëns (Messe de Requiem)
- Verdi (Requiem)
