= Alonso (crater) =

Crater on Miranda

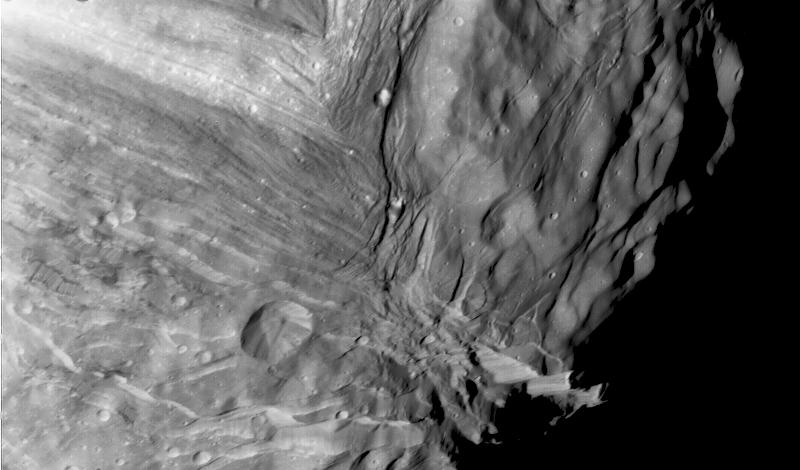
- Voyager 2 image of the central part of Miranda featuring Inverness Corona. Alonso is in the bottom in its east
- Feature type: Impact crater
- Location: Miranda
- Coordinates: 44°S 352.6°E
- Diameter: 25 kilometres (16 mi)
- Discoverer: Voyager 2
- Naming: Official
- Eponym: Alonso, King of Naples, in Shakespeare's The Tempest

Alonso is a crater in the southern hemisphere of Miranda, a moon of Uranus, located at 44° S, 352.6 ° E. It has a diameter of 25 kilometres (16 mi). The crater is named after Alonso, King of Naples, one of the characters in Shakespeare's The Tempest. The name Alonso was officially approved by the International Astronomical Union (IAU) in 1988.

== Geology and characteristics ==
Alonso is roughly 24–25 kilometers in diameter and contains a central mound roughly 14 kilometers in diameter. Many of Miranda's craters and other surface features were covered in a thick layer of surface material known as regolith after formation in a process called mantling. However, Alonso is relatively pristine and exposed, exhibiting minimal mantling. Assuming that the effects of mantling and mass wasting processes (such as landslides) were minimal following Alonso's formation, planetary scientists C. B. Beddingfield and R. J. Cartwright calculating a regolith thickness of 1.4+0.3
−0.4 km for the region the crater formed in. This may represent the upper limit of regolith thickness on Miranda.
