= Bodwyn =

Coordinates: 53.3654°N 4.5211°W

- Location within Anglesey
- OS grid reference: SH 3235 8835
  - Cardiff: 142 mi (229 km)
  - London: 225 mi (362 km)
- Community: Cylch-y-Garn
- Principal area: Anglesey
- Preserved county: Gwynedd
- Country: Wales
- Sovereign state: United Kingdom
- Post town: Holyhead
- Police: North Wales
- Fire: North Wales
- Ambulance: Welsh
- UK Parliament: Ynys Môn
- Senedd Cymru – Welsh Parliament: Ynys Môn

Bodwyn is a hamlet in the community of Cylch-y-Garn, Isle of Anglesey, Wales, which is 142 miles (229 km) from Cardiff and 225 miles (362 km) from London.

== See also ==
- List of localities in Wales by population
