= Mussorgsky Peaks =

Two rocky peaks in Antarctica

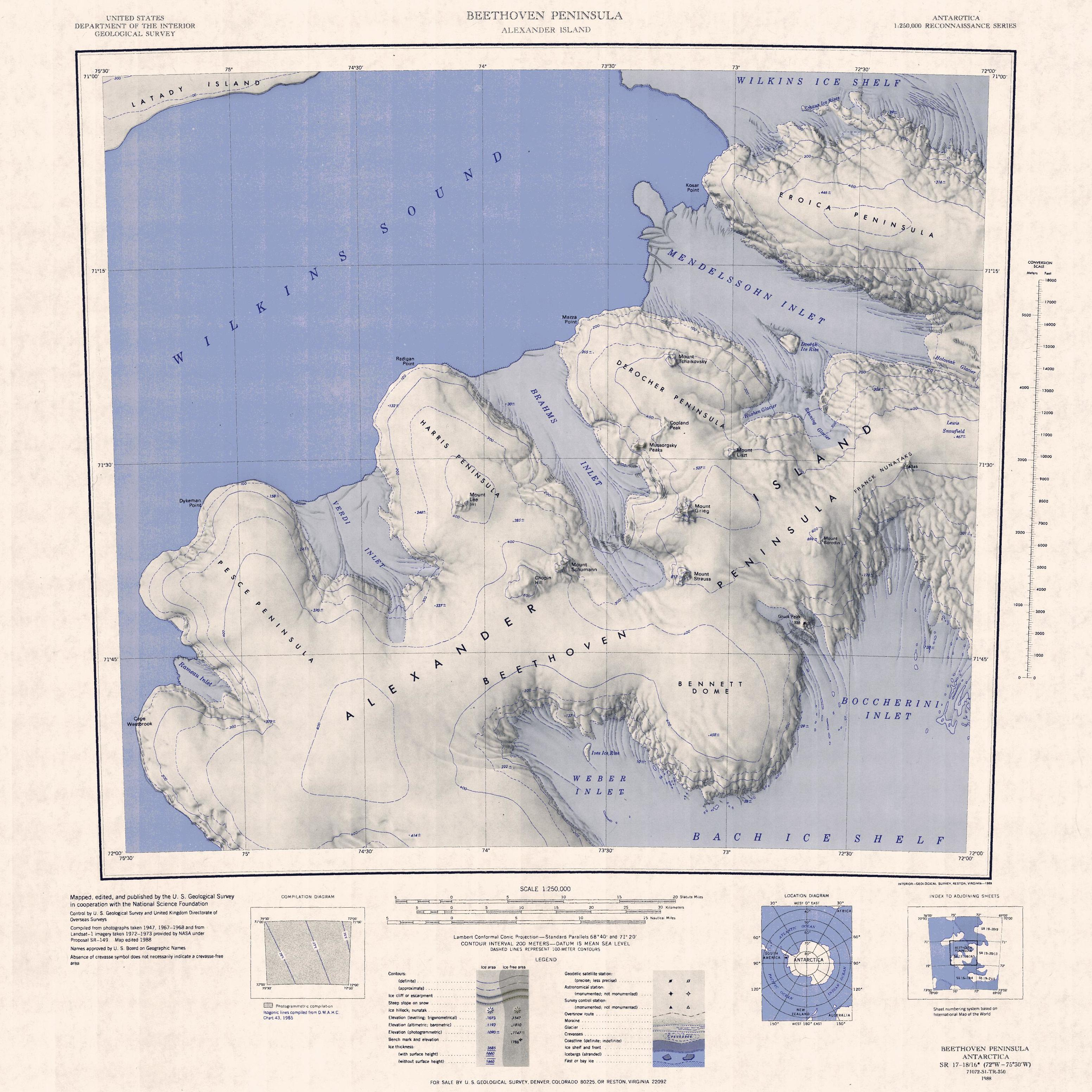
Topographic reconnaissance map of the Beethoven Peninsula area of Alexander Island from in Antarctica including Mussorgsky Peaks

Mussorgsky Peaks (71°29′S 73°22′W) are two rocky peaks rising to about 500 m lying northwest of Mount Grieg on the base of the Derocher Peninsula, a minor, ice-covered peninsula that protrudes out from the Beethoven Peninsula into the Wilkins Ice Shelf in the southwest portion of Alexander Island, Antarctica. A number of peaks in this vicinity first appear on maps by the Ronne Antarctic Research Expedition (RARE), 1947–48. These peaks, apparently included within that group, were mapped from RARE air photos by Searle of the Falkland Islands Dependencies Survey (FIDS) in 1960. Named by the United Kingdom Antarctic Place-Names Committee (UK-APC) after Modest Mussorgsky (1839–81), Russian composer.

== See also ==
- Landers Peaks
- Miranda Peaks
- Richter Peaks
