= Squalane =

- Skeletal formula of squalane

Names
- Preferred IUPAC name 2,6,10,15,19,23-Hexamethyltetracosane
- Other names Perhydrosqualene; Dodecahydrosqualene

Identifiers
CAS Number	111-01-3
3D model (JSmol)	Interactive image
Beilstein Reference	776019
ChemSpider	7798
ECHA InfoCard	100.003.478
EC Number	203-825-6
KEGG	D05915
MeSH	squalane
PubChem CID	8089
RTECS number	XB6070000
UNII	GW89575KF9
CompTox Dashboard (EPA)	DTXSID0046513
- InChI: InChI=1S/C30H62/c1-25(2)15-11-19-29(7)23-13-21-27(5)17-9-10-18-28(6)22-14-24-30(8)20-12-16-26(3)4/h25-30H,9-24H2,1-8H3 Key: PRAKJMSDJKAYCZ-UHFFFAOYSA-N
- SMILES: CC(C)CCCC(C)CCCC(C)CCCCC(C)CCCC(C)CCCC(C)C

Properties
Chemical formula	C_{30}H_{62}
Molar mass	422.826 g·mol^{−1}
Appearance	Colorless liquid
Odor	Odorless
Density	810 mg/mL
Melting point	−38 °C (−36 °F; 235 K)
Boiling point	176 °C (349 °F; 449 K) at 7 Pa
Refractive index (n_{D})	1.452
Viscosity	31.123 mPa·s

Thermochemistry
Heat capacity (C)	886.36 J/(K·mol)
Std enthalpy of formation (Δ_{f}H^{⦵}_{298})	−871.1...−858.3 kJ/mol
Std enthalpy of combustion (Δ_{c}H^{⦵}_{298})	−19.8062...−19.7964 MJ/mol

Hazards
- GHS labelling
Pictograms	(GHS07: Exclamation mark)
Signal word	Warning
Hazard statements	H315, H319, H335
Precautionary statements	P261, P305+P351+P338
Flash point	218 °C (424 °F; 491 K)

Related compounds
Related alkanes	Phytane
- Except where otherwise noted, data are given for materials in their standard state (at 25 °C [77 °F], 100 kPa). verify (what is ?) Infobox references

Squalane is the organic compound with the formula ((CH_{3})_{2}CH[CH_{2}]_{3}CH(CH_{3})[CH_{2}]_{3}CH(CH_{3})[CH_{2}]_{2})_{2}. A colorless hydrocarbon, it is the hydrogenated derivative of squalene, although commercial samples are derived from nature. In contrast to squalene, due to the complete saturation of squalane, it is not subject to auto-oxidation. This fact, coupled with its lower costs and desirable physical properties, led to its use as an emollient and moisturizer in cosmetics.

== Sources and production ==
Squalene was traditionally sourced from the livers of sharks, with approximately 3000 required to produce one ton of squalane. Due to environmental concerns, other sources such as olive oil, rice and sugar cane have been commercialized, and as of 2014 have been supplying about 40% of the industry total.

In sugar cane squalane manufacturing, farnesene is produced from fermentation of sugarcane sugars using genetically modified Saccharomyces cerevisiae yeast strains. Farnesene is then dimerized to isosqualene and then hydrogenated to squalane.

In olive squalane manufacturing, squalene is extracted from olive oil residues in a green chemistry process, and is then hydrogenated into squalane.

== Uses in cosmetics ==
Squalane was introduced as an emollient in the 1950s. The unsaturated form of squalene is produced in human sebum and the livers of sharks. Squalane has low acute toxicity and is not a significant human skin irritant or sensitizer. In the European Union, Squalane is the standardised INCI name used to declare the ingredient on cosmetic product labels, where it is listed in the European Commission's CosIng inventory with skin-conditioning and emollient functions.

== Miscellaneous information ==
The hydrogenation of squalene to produce squalane was first reported in 1916.
