= Verona Rupes =

Tallest cliff in the solar system

- Verona Rupes, photographed by Voyager 2 in January 1986.
- Feature type: Scarp
- Location: Miranda
- Coordinates: 18.30°S 347.80°E
- Diameter: 116.0 km (72.1 mi)
- Peak: 5–15 km (3.1–9.3 mi); 5–10 km (3.1–6.2 mi); 20 km (12 mi)
- Discoverer: Voyager 2
- Eponym: Verona, the setting for Romeo and Juliet

Verona Rupes is the tallest known cliff on Miranda, a moon of Uranus, and possibly the highest cliff in the Solar System. It was discovered by the Voyager 2 space probe in January 1986. The cliff's mapped northern end is about 23 km south of the equator. Its southern end is about 128 km south. Its centre is about 75 km south.

"Verona Rupes" was adopted by the International Astronomical Union (IAU) in 1988, named after the city of Verona, which is the setting for several plays by William Shakespeare.

It may have been created by a major impact that caused the moon to disrupt and reassemble, or by the crust rifting due to stress from an internal ocean.

The height of the cliff is not known with precision. There are several estimates for its true altitude. Original calculations placed it at between 5 and 10 km (3 and 6 mi) high, while later work assigns larger figures, around 20 km (12 mi). This upper bound would make it the tallest known cliff in the Solar System, a possibility for which the feature has become famous.

Other height studies attempted to take into account the oblique view of the only photograph taken by Voyager 2 and the parallax this causes. That calculation yielded altitudes of between 5 to 15 km (3 to 9 mi). It may be presumed that the scarp extends beyond the terminator, into the northern hemisphere, where the Voyager 2 probe could not see. The scarp's slope in that region is estimated to be around 25 to 30 degrees, presumably giving smaller altitudes as the scarp recedes into darkness.

Given these uncertainties, there is a great deal of variation in time-of-fall calculations. Miranda's surface gravity is less than 1% of Earth's. Under these conditions, depending on the true height of the cliff, a fall from the highest point of Verona Rupes would take between 6 and 13 minutes, with impact velocities ranging from 25.2 m/s (56 mph) to 54.8 m/s (123 mph). Integrating to compensate for the falloff of Miranda's gravitational acceleration at the altitudes involved gives a variation of less than 2% in both time and impact velocity compared to constant surface gravitation.
