= Khufu Peak =

Peak on Alexander Island, Antarctica

Khufu Peak (71°20′S 68°16′W) is a peak rising to about 745 m located in Planet Heights, near the center of the Fossil Bluff massif, on the east side of Alexander Island, Antarctica, in which the east face of the peak faces towards George VI Sound and the George VI Ice Shelf. For many years this was known to British Antarctic Survey (BAS) workers by the unofficial descriptive name "Pyramid," a name already in use. To avoid duplication, in 1987 the United Kingdom Antarctic Place-Names Committee (UK-APC) applied a new name after Khufu, the second Pharaoh of the Fourth Dynasty of Egypt, who erected the Great Pyramid of El Giza.

== See also ==
- Duffy Peak
- Giovanni Peak
- Giza Peak
