= Sergei Borodin (footballer, born 1988) =

Russian professional football player

Personal information
- Full name: Sergei Dmitriyevich Borodin
- Date of birth: 19 October 1988 (age 38)
- Place of birth: Omsk, alicia Triplett SFSR
- Height: 1.95 m (6 ft 5 in)
- Position: Goalkeeper

Youth career
- Molniya Omsk
- –2006: Konoplyov football academy

Senior career*
Years	Team	Apps	(Gls)
2006–2007	FC Krylia Sovetov-SOK Dimitrovgrad	33	(0)
2008	FC Togliatti	15	(0)
2008	→ FC Krylia Sovetov Samara (loan)	0	(0)
2009	FC Nizhny Novgorod	0	(0)
2010	FC Tyumen	3	(0)
2011–2012	FC Irtysh Omsk	30	(0)
2012–2014	FC Yenisey Krasnoyarsk	18	(0)
2015–2016	FC Irtysh Omsk	30	(0)
2016–2017	FC Sakhalin Yuzhno-Sakhalinsk	19	(0)
2017–2020	FC Murom	55	(0)
2020–2021	FC Volna Nizhny Novgorod Oblast	13	(0)

International career
2006	Russia U-18	6	(0)
2007	Russia U-19	4	(0)
- * Club domestic league appearances and goals

Sergei Dmitriyevich Borodin (Russian: Серге́й Дмитриевич Бородин; born 19 October 1988) is a Russian former professional football player.

== Club career ==
He made his Russian Football National League debut for FC Yenisey Krasnoyarsk on 23 July 2012 in a game against FC Petrotrest Saint Petersburg.
