= Staccato Peaks =

Peaks on Alexander Island, Antarctica

- Location within Antarctica

Highest point
- Elevation: 940 m (3,080 ft)
- Parent peak: Hageman Peak
- Coordinates: 71°47′S 70°39′W

Geography
- Location: Alexander Island, Antarctica

Staccato Peaks (71°47′S 70°39′W) is a series of rock peaks extending 11 miles (18 km) in a north–south direction, rising to about 940 m with Hageman Peak being the highest peak of the Staccato Peaks, rising from the snowfields 20 miles (32 km) south of the Walton Mountains in the south part of Alexander Island, Antarctica. The peaks were first sighted from the air by Lincoln Ellsworth on 23 November 1935, and mapped from photos taken on that flight by W.L.G. Joerg. Remapped from air photos taken by the Ronne Antarctic Research Expedition in 1947–48, by Searle of the Falkland Islands Dependencies Survey in 1960. The name, given by the United Kingdom Antarctic Place-Names Committee, refers to the precipitous and abrupt way in which the peaks rise from the surrounding snowfields and is associated with other musical names in the vicinity.

== 2012 British Antarctic Survey expedition ==
In December 2012, Hamish Pritchard of the British Antarctic Survey (BAS) embarked on an expedition through the Staccato Peaks, he and his accompanists arrived at the Shostakovich Peninsula, and trekked inland in an eastward direction, they reached Hageman Peak shortly afterwards, and marched into the central zone of Staccato Peaks, here, a two-man field camp was established at the base of Duffy Peak overnight. After disestablishing the minor field camp, Pritchard's team continued to travel eastward before they left the geographical vicinity of these peaks, after traveling an elapsed distance of almost 40 kilometers, Pritchard arrived at Mimas Peak, where he began his successful ascent of this topographical feature, on 16 December 2012, Hamish Pritchard became the first individual to ascend to the summit of Mimas Peak, while ascending to the summit of this peak, rock samples were detected by Pritchard, he concluded that these summits must have emerged from retreating ice sheets hundreds of years ago.
