= Copland Peak =

Peak in Antarctica

Copland Peak (71°27′S 73°16′W) is a peak 3 nautical miles (6 km) northeast of the Mussorgsky Peaks and about 1.2 miles (2 km) south of Mazza Point near the tip of Derocher Peninsula, in the north central area of Beethoven Peninsula, situated in southwest Alexander Island, Antarctica. It was mapped by the United States Geological Survey from U.S. Navy aerial photographs taken 1967–68 and from Landsat imagery taken 1972–73. In association with names of composers in the area, it was named by the Advisory Committee on Antarctic Names after Aaron Copland, the American composer (1900–90).
