= Fossil Bluff =

Fossil Bluff Station
- Antarctic base
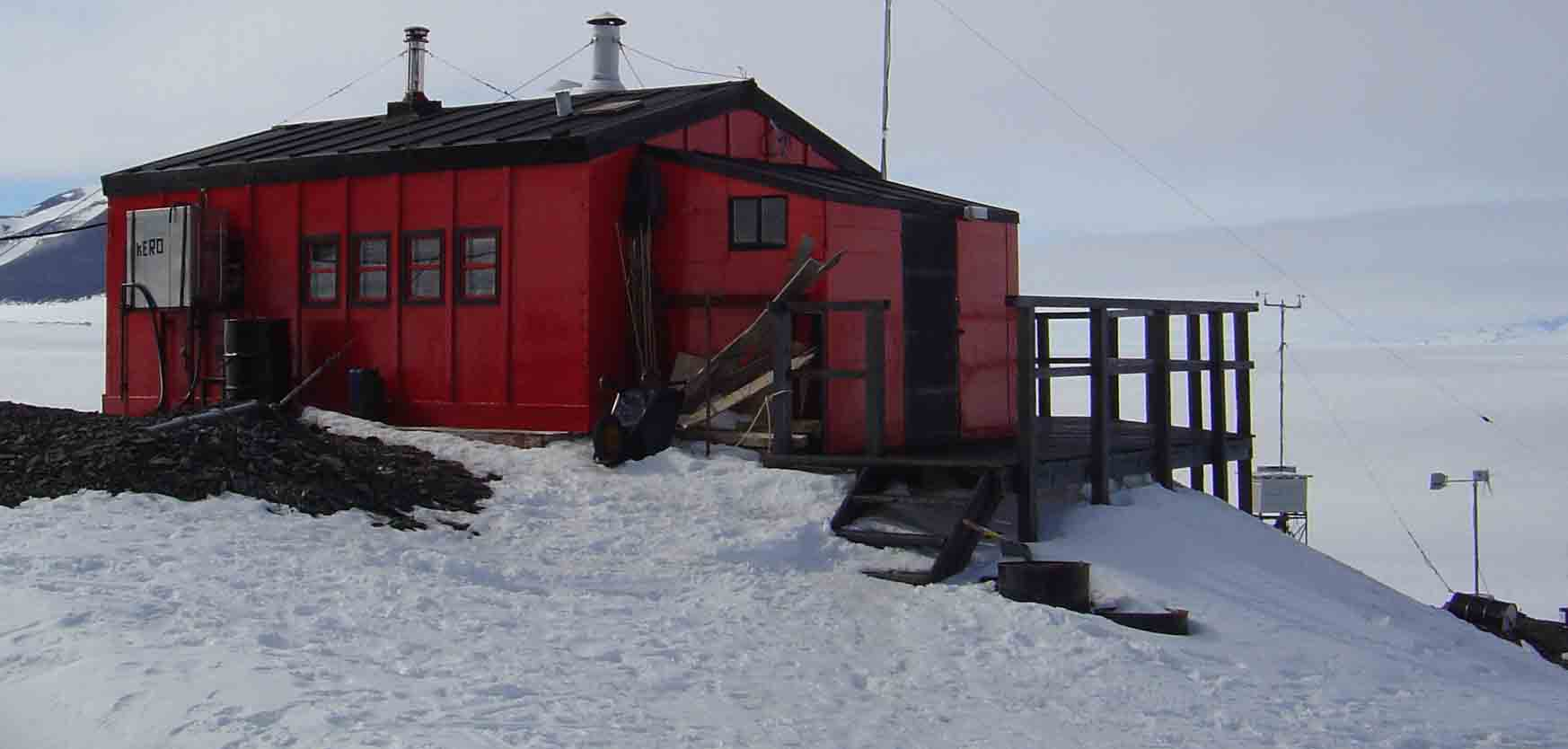
- The Hut at Fossil Bluff, Antarctica

- Location of Fossil Bluff in Antarctica
- Coordinates: 71°20′00″S 68°17′00″W
- Country: United Kingdom
- Location in Antarctica: George VI Sound; Alexander Island
- Administered by: British Antarctic Survey
- Established: 20 February 1961
- Elevation: 92 m (302 ft)

Population
  - Summer: Up to 7
  - Winter: 2 or 3
- Time zone: UTC-3 (ART)
- Type: Seasonal
- Period: Summer
- Status: Operational

Fossil Bluff is a seasonal British aircraft refuelling station located on the east coast of Alexander Island in Antarctica. In operation since 1961, its facilities provide fuel, storage, and ancillary support for British exploration and operations during the summer season, October through March. The site is adjacent to a natural, north–south travelling route along the George VI Ice Shelf.

Fossil Bluff is a collection of buildings and facilities, at the centre of which lies Fossil Bluff Station.

== Geography ==
Fossil Bluff hut sits at the foot of a scree-covered ridge overlooking George VI Sound which separates mountainous Alexander Island from Palmer Land. George VI Ice Shelf occupies the sound and provides a north–south route for travelling parties except in high summer when the ice shelf's surface is flooded with meltwater. To the west and north-west lie Planet Heights, an extensive range of mountains rising to over 1,500 metres (4,900 ft). Immediately to the west lies Giza Peak and the snow-free Promenade Screes. The Screes are criss-crossed with pathways, and are frequently the destination of short walks from the nearby field station.

== History ==
The base has been in use intermittently since 20 February 1961. Occupied during the winters of 1961, 1962, and 1969–1975, it has been used every summer since 1975. The first people to overwinter in 1961 were Cliff Pearce and John Smith (meteorologists) and Brian Taylor (geologist) who carried out a thorough and systematic investigation of the local geology.

Fossil Bluff capacity is four people, but when occupied is inhabited by two or three.

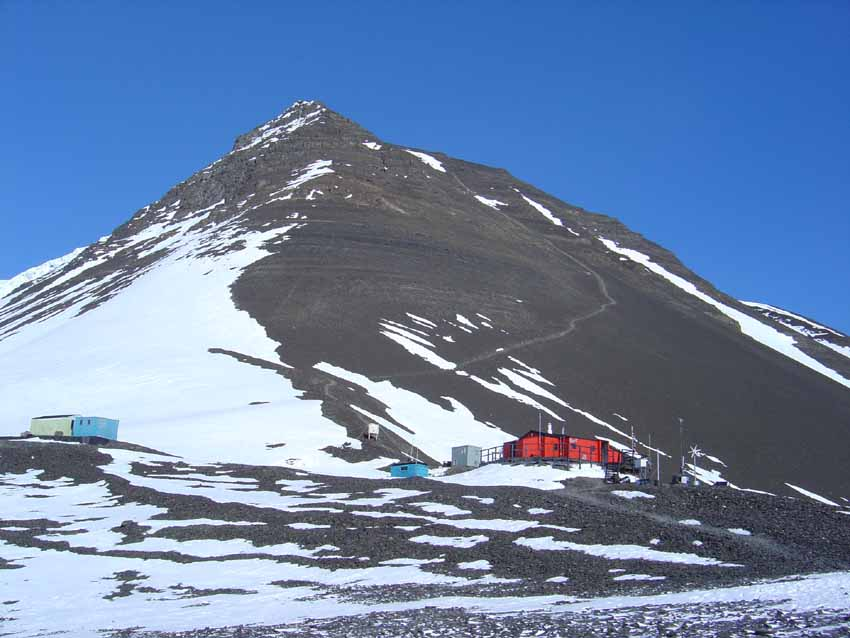
The station at Fossil Bluff below Giza Peak

== Fossil Bluff Skiway ==
Fossil Bluff Skiway
- IATA: none; ICAO: AT10

Summary
- Airport type: Private
- Location: Fossil Bluff; George VI Sound
- Elevation AMSL: 32 ft (9.8 m)
- Coordinates: 71°19′46″S 68°16′01″W

Map
- Location of airfield in Antarctica

Runways
Direction	Length		Surface
Direction	ft	m	Surface
17/35	3,960	1,207	Snow

Fossil Bluff is a forward-operating facility for refuelling aircraft and is operated by Rothera station during the Antarctic summer season between October and March. There is a 1,200-metre (3,900 ft) unprepared skiway marked by drums 1 kilometre (0.6 mi) south of the station.

De Havilland Canada DHC-6 Twin Otter aircraft ferry drums of fuel from Rothera Research Station to Fossil Bluff each summer to maintain the size of the fuel depot. The station is 90 minutes flying time from Rothera Research Station. It is used extensively as a jumping-off point for further operations into Antarctica. The next 'traditional' stop for the Twin Otters is Sky Blu, 85 minutes away.

== See also ==
- List of Antarctic research stations
- List of Antarctic field camps
- Airports in Antarctica
- Belemnite Valley
- Ethelbert Ridge
