= List of glaciers of Palmer Land =

Following is a list of glaciers of Palmer Land in Antarctica. This list may not reflect recently named glaciers in Palmer Land.

== Antarctic Peninsula ==
- Airy Glacier
- Anthony Glacier
- Armstrong Glacier
- Ashton Glacier
- Barcus Glacier
- Beaumont Glacier
- Bertram Glacier
- Bingham Glacier
- Böhnecke Glacier
- Brown Glacier
- Bryan Glacier
- Carlson Glacier
- Casey Glacier
- Chapman Glacier
- Clifford Glacier
- Cline Glacier
- Clowes Glacier
- Conchie Glacier
- Cordini Glacier
- Croom Glacier
- Defant Glacier
- Douglas Glacier
- Eureka Glacier
- Fenton Glacier
- Fleming Glacier
- Gain Glacier
- Goodenough Glacier
- Gruening Glacier
- Guard Glacier
- Gurling Glacier
- Haines Glacier
- Haley Glacier
- Hall Glacier
- Heezen Glacier
- Hill Glacier
- Houston Glacier
- Irvine Glacier
- Johnston Glacier
- Joughin Glacier
- Kauffman Glacier
- Kellogg Glacier
- Ketchum Glacier
- Kubitza Glacier
- Lurabee Glacier
- McArthur Glacier
- Matheson Glacier
- Matthews Glacier
- Maury Glacier
- Meiklejohn Glacier
- Meinardus Glacier
- Millett Glacier
- Mosby Glacier
- Murrish Glacier
- Muus Glacier
- Naess Glacier
- Nikitin Glacier
- Norman Glacier
- Prospect Glacier
- Rankin Glacier
- Richardson Glacier
- Riley Glacier
- Rotz Glacier
- Rubble Glacier
- Runcorn Glacier
- Ryder Glacier
- Shabica Glacier
- Siegfried Glacier
- Skinner Glacier
- Soto Glacier
- Spear Glacier
- Spiess Glacier
- Squires Glacier
- Srite Glacier
- Strange Glacier
- Sunfix Glacier
- Swann Glacier
- Thomas Glacier
- Ueda Glacier
- Utopia Glacier
- Waverly Glacier
- Wells Glacier
- Wetmore Glacier
- Willey Glacier
- Yates Glacier
- Zephyr Glacier
- Zonda Glacier

== Alexander Island ==
- Alyabiev Glacier
- Arensky Glacier
- Asafiev Glacier
- Balakirev Glacier
- Bartók Glacier
- Bishop Glacier
- Clarsach Glacier
- Coulter Glacier
- Dargomyzhsky Glacier
- Delius Glacier
- Eros Glacier
- Foreman Glacier
- Frachat Glacier
- Gerontius Glacier
- Gilbert Glacier
- Glazunov Glacier
- Grotto Glacier
- Hampton Glacier
- Holoviak Glacier
- Hushen Glacier
- Iliev Glacier
- Jupiter Glacier
- Lennon Glacier
- Liadov Glacier
- McManus Glacier
- Mars Glacier
- Mercury Glacier
- Mikado Glacier
- Moran Glacier
- Narechen Glacier
- Neptune Glacier
- Palestrina Glacier
- Paulus Glacier
- Pluto Glacier
- Rachmaninoff Glacier
- Reuning Glacier
- Rosselin Glacier
- Saturn Glacier
- Sedgwick Glacier
- Sibelius Glacier
- Spartan Glacier
- Sullivan Glacier
- Toynbee Glacier
- Transition Glacier
- Trench Glacier
- Tumble Glacier
- Uranus Glacier
- Varlamov Glacier
- Venus Glacier
- Vivaldi Glacier
- Wager Glacier
- Walter Glacier
- Wubbold Glacier
- Yozola Glacier
