= List of glaciers in the Antarctic: I–Z =

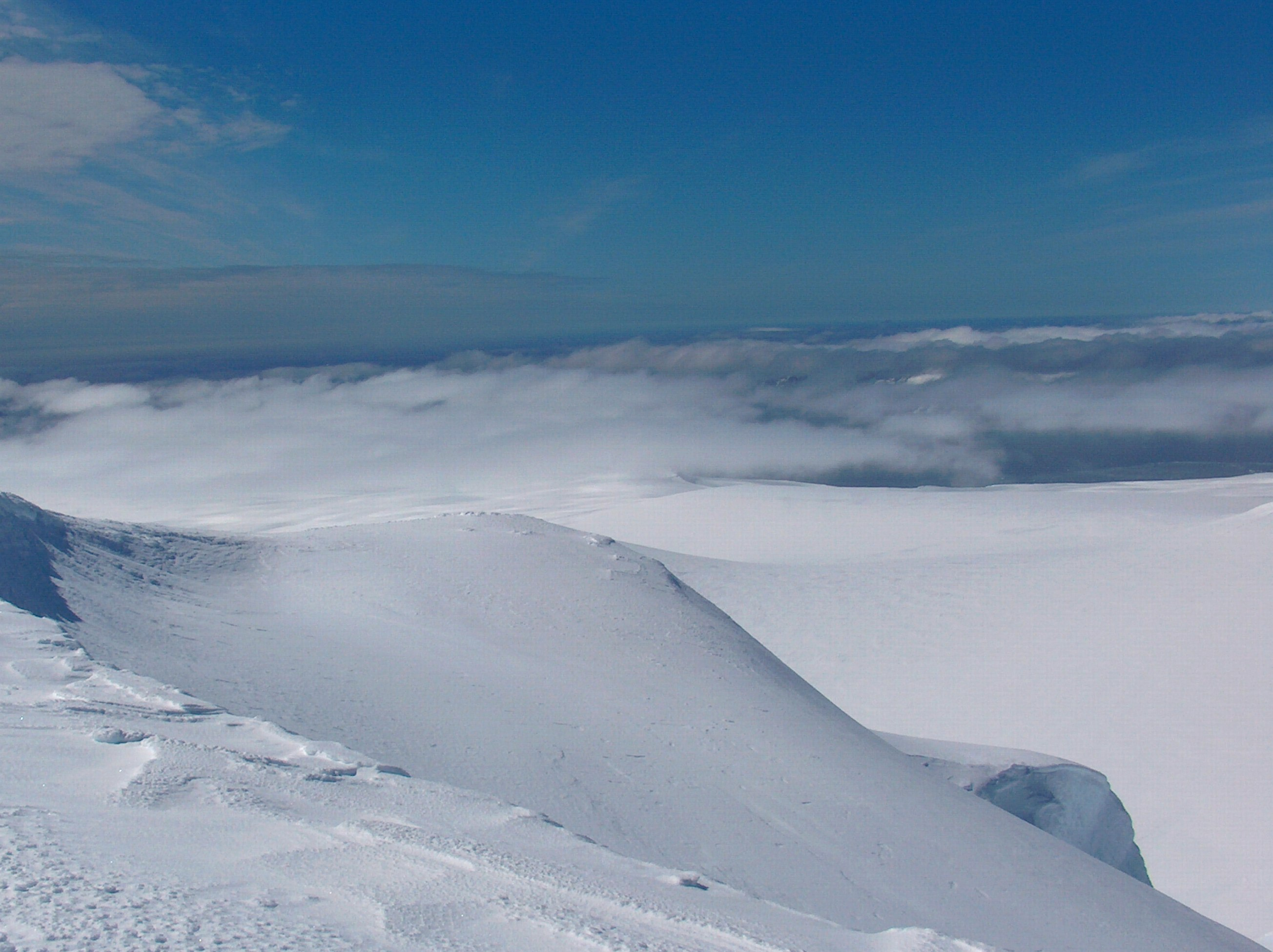
Rose Valley Glacier from Miziya Peak.

This is a list of glaciers in the Antarctic with a name starting with the letters I–Z. This list does not include ice sheets, ice caps or ice fields, such as the Antarctic ice sheet, but includes glacial features that are defined by their flow, rather than general bodies of ice. This list includes outlet glaciers, valley glaciers, cirque glaciers, tidewater glaciers and ice streams. Ice streams are a type of glacier and many of them have "glacier" in their name, e.g. Pine Island Glacier. Ice shelves are listed separately in the List of Antarctic ice shelves. For the purposes of this list, the Antarctic is defined as any latitude further south than 60° (the continental limit according to the Antarctic Treaty System).

== List of glaciers (I–Z) ==
Glaciers in the Antarctic (I–Z)
| Name of Glacier | Coordinates | Length | Comments |
|---|---|---|---|
| Ice Gate Glacier | 64°54′S 62°45′W | | |
| Icebreaker Glacier | 73°37′S 166°10′E | "large" | |
| Ichime Glacier | 68°23′S 42°8′E | | |
| Il Pokemon Glacier | 69°50′S 74°54′E | | |
| Iliad Glacier | 64°27′S 63°27′W | | |
| Iliev Glacier | 69°28′S 71°36′W | 5 km | |
| Ineson Glacier | 64°04′S 58°22′W | | |
| Institute Ice Stream | 82°00′S 75°00′W | | |
| Ironside Glacier | 72°8′S 169°40′E | 48 km | |
| Irvine Glacier | 74°42′S 63°15′W | 64 km | |
| Irving Glacier | 76°13′S 160°16′E | | |
| Irwin Glacier | 71°07′S 163°25′E | | |
| Isbrecht Glacier | 72°14′S 100°46′W | "small" | |
| Ising Glacier | 72°24′S 00°57′E | | |
| Iskar Glacier | 62°38′S 59°59′W | 3 km | 4.4 km wide |
| Jaburg Glacier | 82°42′S 53°25′W | | |
| Jacobel Glacier | 77°44′S 148°17′W | 48 km | |
| Jacobsen Glacier | 82°58′S 167°5′E | | |
| Jacoby Glacier | 75°48′S 132°06′W | | |
| Jorda Glacier | 81°18′S 159°49′E | | |
| Jupiter Glacier | 70°57′S 68°30′W | 18 km | 9 km wide |
| Jutulstraumen Glacier | 71°35′S 00°30′W | "large" | |
| Kaliakra Glacier | 62°35′S 60°10′W | 7 km | 8.5 km wide |
| Kamb Ice Stream | 82°15′S 145°00′W | "major" | (Ice Stream C) |
| Kamchiya Glacier | 62°37′S 60°31′W | 2.2 km | 4.6 km wide |
| Kasabova Glacier | 63°56′S 59°55′W | 6 km | |
| Keltie Glacier | 84°53′S 170°20′E | 48 km | |
| Ketchum Glacier | 75°00′S 63°45′W | 80 km | |
| Keys Glacier | 74°48′S 114°0′W | | |
| Kichenside Glacier | 67°46′S 47°36′E | 24 km | |
| Kirkby Glacier | 70°43′S 166°09′E | 32 km | |
| Klein Glacier | 86°48′S 150°0′W | | |
| Kleptuza Glacier | 64°36′S 63°16′W | 6 km | |
| Koettlitz Glacier | 78°15′S 164°15′E | | |
| Kohler Glacier | 74°55′S 113°45′W | | |
| Khandelwal Glacier | 65°45′S 64°19′W | 6.7 km | |
| Kongur Glacier | 62°54′S 62°26′W | 2.7 km | |
| Krapets Glacier | 64°27′S 61°21′W | 3.5 km | |
| Krivodol Glacier | 62°59′S 62°29′W | 3.8 km | |
| Lambert Glacier | 71°00′S 70°00′E | over 400 km | |
| Land Glacier | 75°40′S 141°45′W | 56 km | |
| Landreth Glacier | 63°01′S 62°32′W | 2.3 km | |
| Lawrie Glacier | 66°04′S 64°36′W | | |
| Laws Glacier | 60°38′S 45°38′W | | |
| Le Couteur Glacier | 84°42′S 170°30′W | 28 km | |
| Lennon Glacier | 69°12′S 71°59′W | | |
| Lennox-King Glacier | 83°25′S 168°00′E | 60 km | |
| Leonardo Glacier | 64°42′S 61°58′W | | |
| Leppard Glacier | 65°58′S 62°30′W | "large" | |
| Letnitsa Glacier | 63°03′S 62°36′W | 1.8 km | |
| Leverett Glacier | 85°38′S 147°35′W | 80 km | |
| Lewis Glacier | 67°45′S 65°40′W | | |
| Lillie Glacier | 70°45′S 163°55′E | 160 km | |
| Lipen Glacier | 64°29′S 63°17′W | 5 km | |
| Liv Glacier | 84°55′S 168°00′W | 64 km | |
| Lliboutry Glacier | 67°30′S 66°46′W | | |
| Long Glacier | 72°30′S 96°43′W | | |
| Lovejoy Glacier | 70°48′S 160°10′E | | |
| Lucy Glacier | 82°24′S 158°25′E | | |
| Lurabee Glacier | (69°15′S 63°37′W) | 50 km | |
| MacAyeal Ice Stream | 80°00′S 143°00′W | "major" | (Ice Stream E) |
| Magura Glacier | 62°40′S 60°00′W | 1.9 km | 3.5 km wide |
| Malorad Glacier | 63°34′S 58°43′W | | |
| Marchetti Glacier | 77°09′32″S 161°29′42″E | | |
| Marin Glacier | 76°04′S 162°22′E | | |
| Mariner Glacier | 73°15′S 167°30′E | over 100 km | |
| Mars Glacier | 71°54′S 68°23′W | 11 km | 3.7 km wide |
| Marsh Glacier | 82°52′S 158°30′E | 110 km | |
| Martin Glacier | 68°29′S 66°53′W | 14 km | |
| Matataua Glacier | 78°06′S 162°03′E | 13 km | |
| McClinton Glacier | 74°40′S 114°0′W | | |
| McManus Glacier | 69°28′S 71°27′W | | |
| Meander Glacier | 73°16′S 166°55′E | "large" | |
| Medven Glacier | 62°33′S 60°43′W | 2.5 km | |
| Mellor Glacier | 73°30′S 66°30′E | | |
| Mercer Ice Stream | 84°50′S 145°00′W | "major" | (Ice Stream A) |
| Mercury Glacier | 71°34′S 68°14′W | 9 km | 3.7 km wide |
| Mertz Glacier | 67°30′S 144°45′E | 72 km | |
| Mikado Glacier | 69°53′S 70°40′W | | |
| Mill Glacier | 85°10′S 168°30′E | | |
| Minerva Glacier | 79°34′12″S 157°15′00″E | | |
| Minnesota Glacier | 79°00′S 83°00′W | 64 km | |
| Mitev Glacier | 64°13′S 62°10′W | 2.9 km | |
| Moran Glacier | 69°14′S 70°16′W | 18 km | |
| Möller Ice Stream | 82°20′S 63°30′W | | |
| Muldava Glacier | 65°42′S 64°12′W | 4.4 km | |
| Mulock Glacier | 79°00′S 160°00′E | "large" | |
| Murgash Glacier | 62°30′S 59°53′W | 3.4 km | |
| Musala Glacier | 62°32′S 59°37′W | 3.7 km | |
| Myers Glacier | 72°16′S 100°07′W | 13 km | |
| Nadjakov Glacier | 64°45′S 62°23′W | 5.5 km | |
| Narechen Glacier | 69°35′S 71°40′W | 9 km | 11 km wide |
| Nash Glacier | 71°15′S 168°10′E | 32 km | |
| Neptune Glacier | 71°44′S 68°17′W | 22 km | 7 km wide |
| Nesla Glacier | 65°43′S 64°17′W | 6.2 km | |
| Newall Glacier | 77°30′S 162°50′E | | |
| Newcomer Glacier | 77°47′S 85°27′W | 37 km | |
| Nimitz Glacier | 78°55′S 85°10′W | 64 km | |
| Nimrod Glacier | 81°21′S 163°00′E | 135 km | |
| Ninnis Glacier | 68°22′S 147°0′E | "large" | |
| Noll Glacier | 69°33′S 159°09′E | 37 km | |
| Northcliffe Glacier | 66°40′S 98°52′E | | |
| Northeast Glacier | 68°09′S 66°58′W | 21 km | |
| Northwind Glacier | 76°40′S 161°18′E | | USCGC Northwind |
| Nueve de Julio Glacier | 68°26′S 66°52′W | | |
| Nylen Glacier | 77°41′S 161°29′E | | |
| Oakley Glacier | 73°42′S 166°08′E | | |
| Obelya Glacier | 78°37′S 84°23′W | 7.5 km | |
| Ogoya Glacier | 63°27′S 58°01′W | 8 km | |
| O'Hara Glacier | 70°49′S 166°40′E | | |
| Ovech Glacier | 62°58′S 62°27′W | 3.5 km | |
| Palestrina Glacier | 69°21′S 71°35′W | 20 km | 15 km wide |
| Panega Glacier | 62°32′S 60°07′W | 3.7 km | |
| Park Glacier | 74°20′S 110°38′W | | |
| Pashuk Glacier | 63°00′S 62°31′W | 2.7 km | |
| Pastra Glacier | 63°46′S 60°44′W | 4.8 km | |
| Patuxent Ice Stream | 85°15′S 67°45′W | | |
| Paulus Glacier | 69°24′S 70°33′W | | |
| Pautalia Glacier | 62°38′S 59°52′W | 0.7 km | 1.1 km wide |
| Pelter Glacier | 71°57′S 98°22′W | 9 km | |
| Penck Glacier | 77°57′S 34°42′W | "small" | |
| Perez Glacier | 84°06′S 177°00′E | 18 km | |
| Perunika Glacier | 62°37′S 60°16′W | 8 km | |
| Peshtera Glacier | 62°43′S 60°18′W | 2 km | |
| Pilot Glacier | 73°23′S 165°03′E | | |
| Pimpirev Glacier | 62°36′S 60°25′W | 1.8 km | 5.5 km wide |
| Pine Island Glacier | 75°10′S 100°0′W | "large" | |
| Pirin Glacier | 64°06′S 60°43′W | 5.7 km | 6 km wide |
| Pirogov Glacier | 64°17′S 62°29′W | 5 km | |
| Pluto Glacier | 71°7′S 68°22′W | 18 km | 7 km wide |
| Poduene Glacier | 64°27′S 61°32′W | 3.3 km | |
| Polar Times Glacier | 69°46′S 74°35′E | | |
| Polarårboken Glacier | 69°36′S 76°0′E | 5.6 km | |
| Posadowsky Glacier | 66°50′S 89°25′E | | |
| Poulter Glacier | 86°50′S 153°30′W | | |
| Prebble Glacier | 84°16′S 164°30′E | 17 km | |
| Prespa Glacier | 62°44′S 60°13′W | 2.5 km | 3.5 km wide |
| Priddy Glacier | 77°56′S 164°1′E | | |
| Priestley Glacier | 74°20′S 163°22′E | 96 km | |
| Prince Edward Glacier | 82°46′S 159°32′E | | |
| Prince Philip Glacier | 82°21′S 159°55′E | 37 km | |
| Prince of Wales Glacier | 82°44′S 160°10′E | 18 km | |
| Princess Anne Glacier | 82°59′S 159°20′E | | |
| Prospect Glacier | 69°32′S 67°20′W | | |
| Pryor Glacier | 70°5′S 160°10′E | 60 km | |
| Pūanu Glacier | 77°23′30″S 160°58′40″E | | |
| Quartermain Glacier | 67°1′S 65°9′W | | |
| Quito Glacier | 62°27′S 59°47′W | | |
| Quonset Glacier | 85°19′S 127°5′W | 32 km | |
| Rachmaninoff Glacier | 72°30′S 72°35′W | | |
| Rayner Glacier | 67°40′S 48°25′E | | |
| Recovery Glacier | 81°10′S 28°00′W | over 100 km | |
| Reedy Glacier | 85°30′S 134°00′W | over 160 km | |
| Remington Glacier | 78°34′S 84°18′W | 13 km | |
| Renaud Glacier | 67°43′S 65°35′W | | |
| Rennick Glacier | 70°30′S 160°45′E | 320 km long | 32–48 km wide |
| Reuning Glacier | 71°26′S 72°41′W | | |
| Rhesus Glacier | 64°32′S 63°17′W | 7 km | |
| Rippon Glacier | 66°40′S 56°29′E | | |
| Robert Glacier | 67°10′S 56°18′E | | |
| Robson Glacier | 77°05′S 162°11′E | 5.6 km | |
| Roché Glacier | 78°32′S 85°39′W | 5.8 km | |
| Ropotamo Glacier | 62°39′S 59°56′W | 0.6 km | 0.9 km |
| Rose Valley Glacier | 62°31′S 60°6′W | 3.7 km | 5.2 km wide |
| Rosselin Glacier | 69°16′S 70°53′W | | |
| Rumyana Glacier | 78°16′S 85°50′W | 11 km | |
| Rupite Glacier | 63°00′S 62°30′W | 2.9 km | |
| Rusalka Glacier | 65°59′S 64°57′W | 8 km | |
| Rutford Ice Stream | 79°00′S 81°00′W | 290 km | |
| Sabine Glacier | 63°55′S 59°47′W | | |
| Samodiva Glacier | 64°06′S 60°50′W | 3.7 km | |
| Sandhøhallet Glacier | 71°52′S 9°50′E | | |
| Saparevo Glacier | 62°54′S 62°23′W | 1.8 km | 2 km wide |
| Saturn Glacier | 72°0′S 68°35′W | 28 km | 11 km wide |
| Schneider Glacier | 79°29′S 84°17′W | | |
| Schweitzer Glacier | 77°50′S 34°40′W | | |
| Schytt Glacier | 71°35′S 3°40′W | 100 km | |
| Scott Glacier (Transantarctic Mountains) | 85°45′S 153°0′W | 190 km | |
| Scott Glacier (East Antarctica) | 66°30′S 100°20′E | over 32 km | |
| Seaton Glacier | 66°43′S 56°26′E | 27 km | |
| Sedgwick Glacier | 69°51′S 69°22′W | 13 km | 3.7 km wide |
| Sestrimo Glacier | 63°30′S 58°08′W | 11 km | |
| Shabica Glacier | 70°21′S 62°45′W | | |
| Shackleton Glacier | 84°35′S 176°20′W | over 96 km | |
| Shambles Glacier | 67°20′S 68°13′W | 6 km | |
| Shanklin Glacier | 84°37′S 176°40′E | | |
| Shark Fin Glacier | 78°23′S 162°55′E | | |
| Sharp Glacier | 67°20′S 66°27′W | | |
| Sharpend Glacier | 76°52′S 160°56′E | 2.4 km | |
| Sheehan Glacier | 70°56′S 162°24′E | | |
| Sheldon Glacier | 67°30′S 68°23′W | | |
| Shell Glacier | 77°16′S 166°25′E | | |
| Shinnan Glacier | 67°55′S 44°38′E | | |
| Shipley Glacier | 71°26′S 169°12′E | 40 km | |
| Shirase Glacier | 70°5′S 38°45′E | | |
| Shoemaker Glacier | 73°47′S 164°45′E | | |
| Shoesmith Glacier | 67°51′S 67°12′W | | |
| Shuman Glacier | 75°15′S 139°30′W | 10 km | |
| Sibelius Glacier | 69°55′S 70°5′W | 19 km | |
| Siegfried Glacier | 69°33′S 72°28′W | | |
| Siemiatkowski Glacier | 75°54′S 144°12′W | 40 km | |
| Sigmen Glacier | 64°01′S 61°56′W | 2.5 km | |
| Sigyn Glacier | 71°52′S 8°36′E | | |
| Sikorski Glacier | 71°49′S 98°24′W | "small" | |
| Sikorsky Glacier | 64°12′S 60°53′W | | |
| Silk Glacier | 81°9′S 158°55′E | 16 km | |
| Simmons Glacier | 75°0′S 113°36′W | | |
| Simpson Glacier | 71°17′S 168°38′E | 10 km | |
| Sirma Glacier | 78°47′S 85°05′W | 7 km | |
| Skålebreen | 72°6′S 3°52′E | | |
| Skelton Glacier | 78°35′S 161°30′E | "large" | |
| Škorpil Glacier | 66°38′S 66°16′W | 12 km | |
| Slessor Glacier | 79°50′S 028°30′W | over 120 km | |
| Smith Glacier | 75°05′S 112°00′W | over 160 km | |
| Socks Glacier | 83°42′S 170°5′E | "small" | |
| Sölch Glacier | 67°4′S 66°23′W | | |
| Solun Glacier | 66°39′S 66°03′W | 9.3 km | |
| Sørsdal Glacier | 68°41′S 78°15′E | 28 km | |
| Srebarna Glacier | 62°41′S 60°02′W | | |
| Stancomb-Wills Glacier | 75°18′S 19°0′W | "large" | |
| Strandzha Glacier | 62°38′S 59°54′W | 0.8 km | 1.6 km wide |
| Struma Glacier | 62°36′S 60°07′W | 4.8 km | |
| Suárez Glacier | 64°56′S 62°56′W | | |
| Suess Glacier | 77°38′S 162°40′E | | |
| Sullivan Glacier | 69°42′S 70°45′W | | |
| Sunfix Glacier | (69°16′S 64°30′W) | 28 km | 3.7 km wide |
| Support Force Glacier | 82°45′S 046°30′W | "major" | |
| Suter Glacier | 73°31′S 167°10′E | "short" | |
| Sylwester Glacier | 84°14′S 159°48′E | 8 km | |
| Talev Glacier | 65°37′S 63°55′W | 4 km | |
| Targovishte Glacier | 62°33′S 59°38′W | 1.6 km | |
| Taylor Glacier | 77°44′S 162°10′E | 54 km | |
| Telemeter Glacier | 77°48′S 160°12′E | 1.6 km | |
| Teteven Glacier | 62°28′S 59°52′W | 3.8 km | 6.5 km wide |
| Thamyris Glacier | 64°34′S 63°20′W | 3 km | |
| Thomas Glacier | 78°40′S 84°0′W | | |
| Thomas Glacier | 72°51′S 61°09′W | 23.0 km | 3.0 km wide |
| Thwaites Glacier | 75°30′S 106°45′W | | |
| Tønnesen Glacier | 72°4′S 3°28′E | | |
| Totten Glacier | 67°00′S 116°20′E | 64 km | |
| Toynbee Glacier | 69°35′S 69°35′W | 31 km | 9 km wide |
| Transition Glacier | 70°26′S 68°49′W | 15 km | 3.7 km wide |
| Trench Glacier | 70°12′S 69°11′W | 11 km | 3.7 km wide |
| Tucker Glacier | 72°32′S 169°15′E | 144 km | |
| Tumble Glacier | 69°57′S 69°20′W | 13 km | 6 km wide |
| Tundzha Glacier | 62°36′S 60°31′W | 4.5 km | 14 km wide |
| Ueda Glacier | 75°15′S 64°35′W | "large" | |
| Underwood Glacier | 66°35′S 108°0′E | 24 km | |
| Union Glacier | 79°45′S 082°30′W | "large" | |
| Uranus Glacier | 71°24′S 68°20′W | 32 km | |
| Urdoviza Glacier | 62°32′S 60°44′W | 2.8 km | 3 km wide |
| Utopia Glacier | 71°51′S 68°16′W | | |
| Utstikkar Glacier | 67°33′S 61°20′E | | |
| Vacchi Piedmont Glacier | 74°34′S 164°38′E | | |
| Van der Veen Ice Stream | 83°50′S 130°00′W | "large" | (Ice Stream B1) |
| Van Reeth Glacier | 86°25′S 148°0′W | | |
| Vanderford Glacier | 66°35′S 110°26′E | | |
| Varlamov Glacier | 71°40′S 73°25′W | | |
| Venus Glacier | 71°38′S 68°15′W | 18 km | 11 km wide |
| Venzke Glacier | (75°0′S 134°24′W) | | CAPT N.C. Venzke, USCG, Commanding, USCGC Northwind |
| Vereyken Glacier | (78°25′S 163°57′E) | | |
| Verila Glacier | 62°36′S 60°42′W | 4 km | 13 km wide |
| Vestreskorve Glacier | 71°57′S 5°5′E | | |
| Veststraumen Glacier | 74°15′S 15°0′W | 72 km | |
| Vetrino Glacier | 62°56′S 62°30′W | 3.2 km | |
| Vidbol Glacier | 64°40′S 62°30′W | 5.5 km | |
| Vivaldi Glacier | 70°47′S 69°50′W | | |
| Wager Glacier | 69°48′S 69°23′W | | |
| Wahl Glacier | 83°59′S 165°06′E | 16 km | |
| Walk Glacier | 73°38′S 94°18′W | | |
| Walter Glacier | 69°17′S 70°21′W | | |
| Warr Glacier | 72°11′S 98°19′W | | |
| Wetmore Glacier | 74°38′S 63°35′W | 64 km | |
| Whillans Ice Stream | 83°40′S 145°00′W | "major" | (Ice Stream B) |
| Williams Ice Stream | 73°15′S 88°27′W | 24 km | |
| Williamson Glacier | 66°40′S 114°06′E | | |
| Wilma Glacier | 67°12′S 56°00′E | | |
| Wirdnam Glacier | 78°25′S 162°2′E | | |
| Wright Lower Glacier | 77°25′S 163°0′E | | |
| Wubbold Glacier | 69°20′S 71°35′W | 15 km | |
| Wulfila Glacier | 62°33′S 59°45′W | 2 km | 3 km wide |
| Yablanitsa Glacier | 62°57′S 62°31′W | 1.8 km | |
| Yakoruda Glacier | 62°28′S 59°57′W | 2.5 km | 3.5 km wide |
| Yamato Glacier | 71°25′S 35°35′E | | |
| Yancey Glacier | 80°14′S 158°30′E | | |
| Yates Glacier | 70°49′S 62°12′W | 4.8 km | |
| Yeats Glacier | 85°01′S 175°0′W | 13 km | |
| Yoder Glacier | 75°07′S 114°24′W | 4.8 km | |
| Young Glacier | 78°04′S 84°49′W | 13 km | |
| Yozola Glacier | 69°27′S 71°24′W | 5 km | |
| Zaneveld Glacier | 85°26′S 176°25′W | | |
| Zelee Glacier | 66°52′S 141°10′E | 10 km | |
| Zeller Glacier | 80°55′S 156°30′E | 16 km | |
| Zenith Glacier | 71°52′S 163°45′E | | |
| Zephyr Glacier | 69°28′S 68°36′W | 13 km | |
| Zetland Glacier | 78°01′S 163°49′E | "small" | |
| Zheravna Glacier | 62°33′S 59°41′W | 1.8 km | 2 km wide |
| Zimzelen Glacier | 64°27′S 61°18′W | 3.7 km | |
| Zinberg Glacier | 72°21′S 96°04′W | | |
| Znosko Glacier | 62°06.3′S 58°28′W | 2.1 km | |
| Zoller Glacier | 77°53′S 162°18′E | | |
| Zonda Glacier | 69°33′S 68°30′W | 13 km | |
| Zotikov Glacier | 85°02′S 169°15′W | 13 km | |
| Zuniga Glacier | 74°34′S 111°51′W | | |
| Zykov Glacier | 70°37′S 164°46′E | 40 km | |

== See also ==
- List of Antarctic and subantarctic islands
- List of Antarctic ice shelves
- List of Antarctic ice streams
- List of glaciers
- List of subantarctic glaciers
