= List of glaciers in the Antarctic: A–H =

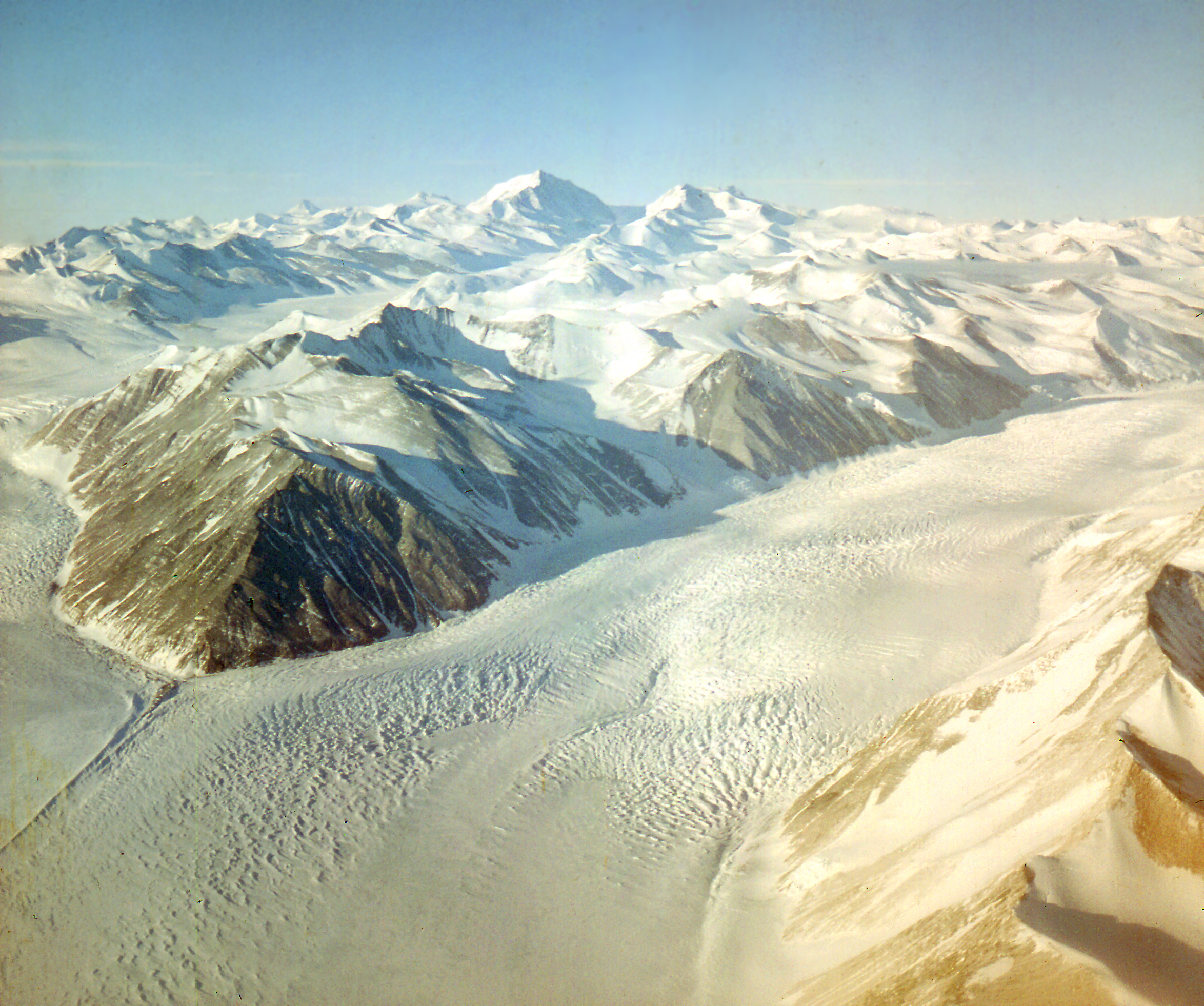
Aerial view of the Dugdale Glacier in 1956

This is a list of glaciers in the Antarctic with a name starting with the letters A–H. This list does not include ice sheets, ice caps or ice fields, such as the Antarctic ice sheet, but includes glacial features that are defined by their flow, rather than general bodies of ice. This list includes outlet glaciers, valley glaciers, cirque glaciers, tidewater glaciers and ice streams. Ice streams are a type of glacier and many of them have "glacier" in their name, e.g. Pine Island Glacier. Ice shelves are listed separately in the List of Antarctic ice shelves. For the purposes of this list, the Antarctic is defined as any latitude further south than 60° (the continental limit according to the Antarctic Treaty System).

== List of glaciers (A–H) ==
Glaciers in the Antarctic (A–H)
Name of Glacier	Coordinates	Length	Comments
Aagaard Glacier	66°46′S 64°31′W	13 km	
Aaron Glacier	85°08′S 90°40′W	6.4 km	
Academy Glacier	84°15′S 61°00′W	"major"	
Acosta Glacier	71°58′S 100°55′W	3.2 km	
Adams Glacier (Victoria Land)	78°07′S 163°38′E	"small"	
Adams Glacier (Wilkes Land)	66°50′S 109°40′E	over 32 km	
Aeronaut Glacier	73°16′S 163°36′E	40 km	
Agalina Glacier	64°26′S 61°26′W	4.8 km	
Ahern Glacier	81°47′S 159°10′E	"small"	
Ahlmann Glacier	67°52′S 65°45′W		
Ahrnsbrak Glacier	79°48′S 82°18′W		
Aiken Glacier	77°38′S 163°24′E	"small"	
Airy Glacier	69°13′S 66°20′W	37 km	
Aitkenhead Glacier	63°57′S 58°44′W	16 km	
Akebono Glacier	68°07′S 42°53′E		
Albanus Glacier	85°52′S 151°0′W	40 km	
Alberich Glacier	77°36′S 161°36′E	"small"	
Alberts Glacier	66°52′S 64°53′W	13 km	
Albone Glacier	64°13′S 59°42′W		
Albrecht Penck Glacier	76°40′S 162°20′E		
Algie Glacier	82°08′S 162°05′E	40.2 km	
Alice Glacier	83°58′S 170°0′E	20.9 km	
Alley Glacier	79°58′S 158°5′E		
Allison Glacier	78°16′S 161°55′E		
Altimir Glacier	64°36′S 63°09′W	4.8 km	5.5 km wide
Altarduken Glacier	71°39′S 11°26′E		
Alvarez Glacier	70°53′S 162°20′E		
Alyabiev Glacier	71°42′S 72°40′W		
Ambergris Glacier	65°43′S 62°37′W		
Amos Glacier	77°49′S 163°39′E		
Amphitheatre Glacier	78°17′S 163°4′E		
Amundsen Glacier	85°35′S 159°00′W	128 km	
Anandakrishnan Glacier	75°32′S 140°5′W	28 km	
Anderton Glacier	74°41′S 162°22′E	13 km	
Andrew Glacier	63°53′S 59°40′W	6 km	
Anna Glacier	62°02′S 58°12′W		
Ant Hill Glacier	78°49′S 161°30′E		
Antevs Glacier	67°19′S 66°49′W		
Anthony Glacier	69°47′S 62°45′W		
Anu Whakatoro Glacier	77°17′S 161°42′E	1.12 km	
Anuchin Glacier	71°17′S 13°31′E		
Apfel Glacier	66°25′S 100°35′E	9 km	
Aphrodite Glacier	68°47′S 64°32′W	28 km	
Apollo Glacier	68°50′S 64°45′W	17 km	
Arago Glacier	64°51′S 62°23′W		
Arapya Glacier	78°12′S 84°54′W	11.4 km	
Archer Glacier	65°10′S 63°05′W		
Arena Glacier	63°24′S 57°03′W	6 km	
Arensky Glacier	71°39′S 72°15′W		
Argentina Glacier	62°41′S 60°24′W		
Argo Glacier	83°22′S 157°30′E	18 km	
Argonaut Glacier	73°13′S 166°42′E	16 km	
Argosy Glacier	83°8′S 157°35′E	28 km	
Armira Glacier	63°01′S 62°32′W	3 km	
Armstrong Glacier	71°31′S 67°30′W		
Arneb Glacier	72°25′S 170°2′E	6 km	
Arriens Glacier	73°27′S 68°24′E	"small"	
Arruiz Glacier	70°39′S 162°09′E		
Arthur Glacier	77°03′S 145°15′W	46 km	
Asafiev Glacier	71°05′S 70°45′W		
Ascent Glacier	83°13′S 156°24′E	3.7 km	
Ashworth Glacier	85°01′S 169°15′E	4.83 km	
Asimutbreen Glacier	71°23′S 13°42′E	"small"	
Assender Glacier	67°36′S 46°25′E		
Astakhov Glacier	70°45′S 163°21′E		
Astapenko Glacier	70°40′S 163°00′E	18 km	
Aster Glacier	78°35′S 08°50′W		
Astro Glacier	82°54′S 157°20′E		
Astrolabe Glacier	66°45′S 139°55′E	16 km	
Astronaut Glacier	73°05′S 164°05′E		
Astudillo Glacier	64°53′S 62°51′W		
Athene Glacier	68°56′S 64°00′W	16 km	
Atka Glacier	76°41′S 161°33′E		
Atkinson Glacier	71°30′S 167°25′E		
Attlee Glacier	66°13′S 63°46′W	13 km	
Aurora Glacier	77°37′S 167°38′E		
Auster Glacier	67°12′S 50°45′E	3.2 km	
Austreskorve Glacier	71°50′S 05°40′E		
Aviator Glacier	73°50′S 165°03′E	over 96 km	
Avsyuk Glacier	67°07′S 67°15′W		
Axel Heiberg Glacier	85°25′S 163°00′W	48 km	
Bachtold Glacier	77°03′S 16°20′W		
Backstairs Passage Glacier	75°02′S 162°36′E	3.7 km	
Bader Glacier	67°37′S 66°45′W		
Bagshawe Glacier	64°56′S 62°35′W		
Bailey Ice Stream	79°00′S 30°00′W		
Baker Glacier	72°46′S 169°15′E		
Balakirev Glacier	71°25′S 07°01′W		
Balch Glacier	66°50′S 64°48′W	17 km	
Balchen Glacier	76°23′S 145°10′W		
Baldwin Glacier	85°06′S 177°10′W	"large"	
Balish Glacier	79°25′S 84°30′W	33 km	
Ball Glacier	78°03′S 162°50′E		
Bally Glacier	81°22′S 159°12′E	11 km	
Baranowski Glacier	62°12′S 58°27′W		
Barber Glacier	70°26′S 162°45′E		
Barcus Glacier	74°15′S 62°00′W		
Barkov Glacier	71°46′S 10°27′E		
Barne Glacier	77°36′S 166°26′E		
Barnes Glacier	67°32′S 66°25′W		
Barnett Glacier	70°59′S 167°30′E	"large"	
Baronick Glacier	78°36′S 161°50′E	11 km	
Barre Glacier	66°35′S 138°40′E	9 km	
Barrett Glacier	84°37′S 174°10′W	28 km	
Bartlett Glacier	86°15′S 152°00′W	60 km	
Bartley Glacier	77°32′S 162°13′E		
Bartok Glacier	69°38′S 71°00′W	13 km	
Bartrum Glacier	79°44′S 158°44′E		
Bates Glacier	74°13′S 163°51′E	"small"	
Battye Glacier	70°52′S 67°54′E		
Baxter Glacier	76°40′S 161°51′E		
Bayly Glacier	64°37′S 61°50′W		
Beaglehole Glacier	66°33′S 64°07′W		
Beakley Glacier	73°51′S 119°50′W		
Beaman Glacier	70°58′S 164°38′E		
Beardmore Glacier	83°45′S 171°00′E	over 160 km	
Beaver Glacier (Enderby Land)	67°2′S 50°40′E	24 km	
Beaver Glacier (Ross Ice Shelf)	83°24′S 169°30′E	24 km	
Beowulf Glacier	77°37′27″S 161°50′31″E		
Berkovitsa Glacier	62°34′S 60°41′W	5 km	
Berry Glacier	75°00′S 134°00′W	40 km	
Bindschadler Ice Stream	81°00′S 142°00′W	"major"	(Ice Stream D)
Bishop glacier	69°42′S 71°27′W		
Bistra Glacier	63°00′S 62°35′W	1.75 km	
Blankenship Glacier	77°59′S 161°46′E		
Böhnecke Glacier	72°23′S 51°25′W		
Bolgrad Glacier	78°44′S 85°08′W	7.4 km	
Bolton Glacier	65°1′S 62°58′W		
Borchgrevink Glacier	73°4′S 168°30′E	"large"	
Bornmann Glacier	72°20′S 170°13′E		
Boyana Glacier	62°42′S 60°06′W	1.6 km	3 km wide
Bozhinov Glacier	64°37′S 61°28′W	5 km	
Brandau Glacier	84°54′S 173°30′E	15 nautical miles (28 km)	
Branscomb Glacier	78°32′S 86°05′W	9.5 km	
Bridgman Glacier	72°23′S 170°5′E		
Burton Island Glacier	66°49′S 90°20′E	7 nautical miles (13 km)	
Butamya Glacier	65°36′S 64°00′W	6.9 km	
Byrd Glacier	80°20′S 159°00′E	136 km	
Canada Glacier	77°37′S 162°59′E	"small"	
Carey Glacier	78°53′S 83°55′W		
Chernomen Glacier	65°39′S 64°03′W	5.8 km	
Chumerna Glacier	64°08′S 62°06′W	2.2 km	
Chuprene Glacier	62°58′S 62°32′W	4 km	
Clarke Glacier (Graham Land)	68°48′S 66°56′W	32 km	
Clarke Glacier (Marie Byrd Land)	75°11′S 139°06′W	13 km	
Clarke Glacier (Victoria Land)	75°34′S 162°05′E	8 km	
Clarsach Glacier	69°57′S 70°17′W		
Co-pilot Glacier	73°11′S 164°22′E		
Collins Glacier	73°41′S 65°55′E	18 km	
Commanda Glacier	77°30′S 162°47′E		
Commonwealth Glacier	77°35′S 163°19′E		
Conrow Glacier	77°34′S 162°7′E		
Coulston Glacier	72°25′S 167°58′E		
Coulter Glacier	69°20′S 71°47′W	9 km	
Cox Glacier	72°12′S 101°2′W		
Crane Glacier	65°00′S 020°00′W	48 km	
Crescent Glacier	77°40′S 163°14′E		
Crevasse Valley Glacier	76°46′S 145°30′W	48 km	
Crume Glacier	71°33′S 169°21′E		
Dale Glacier	78°17′S 162°2′E		
Dalgopol Glacier	62°55′S 62°28′W	3.4 km	
Darwin Glacier	79°53′S 159°00′E	"large"	
Dater Glacier	78°17′S 84°35′W	38 km	
David Glacier	75°19′S 162°00′E	over 96 km	
Davidson Glacier	82°49′S 166°7′E		
Debelt Glacier	62°32′S 60°04′W	2.4 km	
Debenham Glacier	77°10′S 162°38′E		
Deception Glacier	78°33′S 158°33′E		
Decker Glacier	77°28′S 162°47′E		
Delius Glacier	69°37′S 71°3′W	11 km	4 km wide
Deming Glacier	72°00′S 168°30′E		
Denman Glacier	66°45′S 99°30′E	112 km	
Dennistoun Glacier	71°11′S 168°00′E	80 km	
Devils Glacier	86°23′S 165°00′W	32 km	
DeVicq Glacier	75°00′S 131°00′W		
Dibble Glacier	66°17′S 134°36′E		
Dick Glacier	84°53′S 175°50′W		
Dimkov Glacier	64°25′S 62°38′W	6 km	
Dinsmoor Glacier	64°22′S 59°59′W		
Djerassi Glacier	64°13′S 62°27′W	6 km	7 km wide
Dobrudzha Glacier	62°39′S 59°57′W	0.7 km	1.1 km wide
Dragoman Glacier	63°01′S 62°32′W	2.6 km	
Driscoll Glacier	79°42′S 83°00′W		
Drygalski Glacier	64°44′S 60°44′W	29 km	
Ebbe Glacier	71°03′S 164°45′E	96 km	
Echelmeyer Ice Stream	79°10′S 150°00′E	"major"	(Ice Stream F)
Edge Glacier	82°29′S 51°07′W		
El-Sayed Glacier	75°40′S 141°52′W	24 km	
Ellen Glacier	78°13′S 84°30′W	35 km	
Embree Glacier	77°59′S 85°10′W	32 km	
Emmanuel Glacier	77°54′S 162°05′E		
Endeavour Piedmont Glacier	77°23′S 166°40′E	10 km	
Endurance Glacier	61°10′S 55°8′W		
Entrikin Glacier	80°49′S 160°00′E		
Epler Glacier	86°15′S 161°00′W		
Erebus Glacier	77°41′S 167°00′E	"large"	
Eros Glacier	71°18′S 68°20′W	13 km	4 km wide
Evans Ice Stream	76°00′S 78°00′W		
Exum Glacier	73°30′S 94°14′W	"small"	
Falkner Glacier	73°45′S 166°01′E	6 km	
Fendorf Glacier	79°30′S 84°49′W		
Ferrar Glacier	77°46′S 163°00′E	56 km	
Finley Glacier	73°35′S 165°38′E		
Finsterwalder Glacier	67°19′S 66°20′W	16 km	
Flanagan Glacier	79°29′S 82°42′W		
Flask Glacier	65°47′S 62°25′W	40 km	
Fisher Glacier	73°15′S 66°00′E	160 km	
Fitch Glacier	72°01′S 168°07′E		
Foggydog Glacier	79°47′S 158°40′E		
Foreman Glacier	69°18′S 71°22′W		
Foundation Ice Stream	83°15′S 60°00′W	"major"	
Franca Glacier	68°23′S 65°34′W		
Frost Glacier	67°05′S 129°00′E		
Fuerza Aérea Glacier	62°30′S 59°39′W		
Gain Glacier	71°01′S 61°25′W	"large"	
Gair Glacier	73°03′S 166°32′E	16 km	
Gallup Glacier	85°09′S 177°50′W		
Garwood Glacier	78°01′S 163°57′E		
Gaussiran Glacier	80°00′S 159°10′E		
Gerontius Glacier	69°31′S 70°34′W		
Gilbert Glacier	70°00′S 71°00′W	37 km	
Gilchrist Glacier	66°07′S 114°06′E	17 km	
Gillespie Glacier	85°11′S 175°12′W	"small"	
Gillock Glacier	72°00′S 24°08′E	9 km	
Gopher Glacier	73°28′S 94°00′W		
Gordon Glacier	80°17′S 26°09′W		
Gramada Glacier	63°02′S 62°35′W	3 km	
Greenwell Glacier	71°20′S 165°00′E	72 km	
Grigorov Glacier	64°09′S 62°08′W	1.8 km	
Grotto Glacier	70°45′S 68°35′W	46 km	
Haas Glacier	85°45′S 164°55′W		
Haefeli Glacier	67°18′S 66°23′W	3.2 km	
Hale Glacier	72°13′S 100°33′W		
Haffner Glacier	71°28′S 169°24′E	"small"	
Hammond Glacier	77°25′S 146°00′W		
Hampton Glacier	69°20′S 70°5′W	46 km	9 km wide
Haskell Glacier	73°34′S 94°13′W		
Hatherton Glacier	79°55′S 157°35′E		
Hayes Glacier	76°16′S 27°54′W		
Helfferich Glacier	70°35′S 160°12′E	13 km	
Holoviak Glacier	71°22′S 72°9′W)		
Horlick Ice Stream	85°17′S 132°00′W	"large"	
Howe Glacier	86°14′S 149°12′W		
Hushen Glacier	71°26′S 72°52′W		

== See also ==
- List of Antarctic and subantarctic islands
- List of Antarctic ice shelves
- List of Antarctic ice streams
- List of glaciers
- List of subantarctic glaciers
