= Prague Spur =

Prague Spur (70°1′S 70°20′W) is a rock spur rising to about 500 m between Puccini Spur and the Finlandia Foothills, at the east end of the Mozart Ice Piedmont, situated in the northern portion of Alexander Island, Antarctica. Photographed from the air by Ronne Antarctic Research Expedition (RARE), 1947–48, and mapped from these photographs by D. Searle of Falkland Islands Dependencies Survey (FIDS), 1960. Named by United Kingdom Antarctic Place-Names Committee (UK-APC) in 1977 in association with the Mozart Ice Piedmont and Wolfgang Amadeus Mozart's Symphony No. 38, the "Prague", composed in late 1786.

== See also ==
- Mahler Spur
- Pearson Spur
- Senouque Spurs
