= List of glaciers of Enderby Land =

Location of Enderby Land (red), Australian Antarctic Territory in Antarctica

Following is a list of glaciers of Enderby Land in Antarctica. This list may not reflect recently named glaciers in Enderby Land.

Name	Coordinates	Length
Assender Glacier	67°36′S 46°25′E	-
Auster Glacier	67°12′S 50°45′E	2 nautical miles (3.7 km; 2.3 mi)
Beaver Glacier	67°02′S 50°40′E	15 nautical miles (28 km; 17 mi)
Hays Glacier	67°40′S 46°18′E	-
Kichenside Glacier	67°46′S 47°36′E	15 nautical miles (28 km; 17 mi)
Molle Glacier	67°31′S 47°10′E	4 nautical miles (7.4 km; 4.6 mi)
Robert Glacier	67°11′S 55°40′E	-
Seaton Glacier	66°43′S 56°26′E	17 nautical miles (31 km; 20 mi)
Thyer Glacier	67°43′S 48°45′E	-
