= Puccini Spur =

Puccini Spur (70°3′S 70°38′W) is a rock spur, 6 nautical miles (11 km) long, extending southwest into the Mozart Ice Piedmont close south of Mahler Spur in the north part of Alexander Island, Antarctica. It was first seen from the air and roughly mapped by the British Graham Land Expedition (BGLE) in 1937. The Puccini Spur was accurately delineated from air photos taken by the Ronne Antarctic Research Expedition (RARE), 1947–48, and by Searle of the Falkland Islands Dependencies Survey (FIDS) in 1960. It is named by United Kingdom Antarctic Place-Names Committee (UK-APC) after Giacomo Puccini (1858–1924), an Italian operatic composer.

== See also ==
- Mahler Spur
- Pearson Spur
- Senouque Spurs
