= Galerius Peak =

Peak on Alexander Island, Antarctica

Location of Alexander Island in the Antarctic Peninsula region

Satellite image of Alexander Island

Galerius Peak (Bulgarian: връх Галерий, romanized: vrah Galeriy, IPA: [ˈvrɤɣ ɡɐˈlɛrij]) is the ice-covered peak rising to 1259 m and forming the north extremity of Lassus Mountains, northern Alexander Island in Antarctica. It surmounts Iliev Glacier to the west, Palestrina Glacier to the north and McManus Glacier to the east.

The feature is named after the Thracian-born Roman Emperor Galerius, 293-311 AD, who issued in Serdica (present Sofia) the Edict of Toleration legitimizing Christianity in the Roman Empire in 311 AD.

== Location ==
Galerius Peak is located at 69°27′55″S 71°32′58″W, which is 3.28 km east-northeast of Vittoria Buttress, 7.4 km southeast of Mount Holt, 6 km southwest of Mount Braun in Sofia University Mountains, and 3.53 km north of Mount Wilbye. British mapping in 1971.

== Maps ==
- British Antarctic Territory. Scale 1:200000 topographic map. DOS 610 – W 69 70. Tolworth, UK, 1971
- Antarctic Digital Database (ADD). Scale 1:250000 topographic map of Antarctica. Scientific Committee on Antarctic Research (SCAR). Since 1993, regularly upgraded and updated
