= Snick Pass =

Snick Pass (70°41′S 69°25′W) is a narrow mountain pass lying between the Douglas Range and the LeMay Range, leading from Grotto Glacier to Purcell Snowfield in the central portion of Alexander Island, Antarctica. The feature was first mapped from air photos obtained by the Ronne Antarctic Research Expedition in 1947–48, by Searle of the Falkland Islands Dependencies Survey in 1960. The name given by the United Kingdom Antarctic Place-Names Committee is descriptive, a snick being a small cut or incision.

== See also ==
- Gateway Pass
- Haffner Pass
- Tufts Pass
