= Delius (disambiguation) =

Delius most often refers to Frederick Delius, an English composer.

Delius may also mean:

- Delius (surname), a list of people and a fictional character
- Delius Glacier, Alexander Island, Antarctica, named after the composer
- An epithet of the ancient Greek and Roman god Apollo
- "Delius (Song of Summer)", a song from the 1980 Kate Bush album Never for Ever

== See also ==
- Pristimantis delius, a South American frog species
