= Atanasov Ridge =

Ridge on Alexander Island, Antarctica

- Location of Alexander Island in the Antarctic Peninsula region

Highest point
- Elevation: 744 m (2,441 ft)
- Coordinates: 69°48′50″S 71°01′31″W

Dimensions
- Length: 3.8 km (2.4 mi)
- Width: 2.1 km (1.3 mi)

Geography
- Location: Antarctica
- Parent range: Elgar Uplands, Alexander Island

Satellite image of Alexander Island

Atanasov Ridge (Bulgarian: Атанасов Рид, ‘Atanasov Rid’ \a-ta-'na-sov 'rid\) is the partly ice-covered rocky ridge extending 3.8 km in south-southeast to north-northwest direction and 2.1 km wide, rising to 744 m on the southwest side of Elgar Uplands, northern Alexander Island in Antarctica. It surmounts Gilbert Glacier to the southwest.

The feature is named after the Bulgarian composer Georgi Atanasov (1882-1931).

== Location ==
Atanasov Ridge is located at 69°48′50″S 71°01′31″W, which is 9.65 km south by east of Appalachia Nunataks, 8 km southwest of Mount Pinafore, 17.4 km northwest of Mahler Spur, 15.15 km northeast of Ravel Peak in Debussy Heights, and 17.8 km southeast of Sutton Heights. British mapping in 1971.

== Maps ==
- British Antarctic Territory. Scale 1:200000 topographic map. DOS 610 – W 69 70. Tolworth, UK, 1971
- Antarctic Digital Database (ADD). Scale 1:250000 topographic map of Antarctica. Scientific Committee on Antarctic Research (SCAR). Since 1993, regularly upgraded and updated
