= Lyubimets Nunatak =

Nunatak on Alexander Island, Antarctica

Location of Alexander Island in the Antarctic Peninsula region

Satellite image of Alexander Island

Lyubimets Nunatak (Bulgarian: нунатак Любимец, ‘Nunatak Lyubimets’ \'nu-na-tak lyu-'bi-mets\) is the partly ice-covered rocky ridge extending 3.9 km in north-northeast to south-southwest direction and 1.8 km wide, rising to 963 m in Bartók Glacier on the west side of Elgar Uplands in northern Alexander Island, Antarctica. The feature is named after the town of Lyubimets in Southern Bulgaria.

== Location ==
The ridge is located at 69°42′37″S 70°57′46″W, which is 6.27 km northwest of Mount Pinafore, 5.62 km northeast of Appalachia Nunataks and 3.9 km south-southwest of Kozhuh Peak.

== Maps ==
- British Antarctic Territory. Scale 1:200000 topographic map. DOS 610 – W 69 70. Tolworth, UK, 1971
- Antarctic Digital Database (ADD). Scale 1:250000 topographic map of Antarctica. Scientific Committee on Antarctic Research (SCAR). Since 1993, regularly upgraded and updated
