= Haffner Pass =

Haffner Pass (69°47′S 71°22′W) is a pass running northeast–southwest and rising to about 500 metres (1,600 ft) between Gilbert Glacier and Mozart Ice Piedmont in northern Alexander Island, Antarctica. It was surveyed by the British Antarctic Survey, 1975–77, and was named by the UK Antarctic Place-Names Committee in 1980, after Wolfgang Amadeus Mozart's Haffner Symphony (1782) in association with the name of the Mozart Ice Piedmont.

== See also ==
- Snick Pass
- Tufts Pass
- Whistle Pass
