= Bishop Glacier =

Glacier in Antarctica

Bishop Glacier (69°42′S 71°27′W) is a glacier flowing southwest into the Mozart Ice Piedmont, situated in the northwest portion of Alexander Island, Antarctica. This feature was named by the United Kingdom Antarctic Place-names Committee (UK-APC) in 1980 after James Francis Bishop (1950-1980), a former glaciologist of the British Antarctic Survey (BAS) 1972–78, who worked in Alexander Island, 1973–75. He was killed in the Karakoram Range, Pakistan, on July 14, 1980, at this time, he was a member of Royal Geographical Society International Karakoram Project.

== See also ==
- List of glaciers in the Antarctic
- Balakirev Glacier
- Lennon Glacier
- Transition Glacier
