= Balakirev (disambiguation) =

Balakirev is a Russian surname.

Balakirev may also refer to:

- Balakirev the Jester (animated film), a 1993 Russian animated film
- Balakirev the Jester (play), a 2001 Russian play by Lenkom
- Balakirev the Jester, a 2002 Russian television adaptation of Lenkom play
- Balakirev Glacier, Antarctic glacier
- 6777 Balakirev, minor planet

== See also ==
- Balakirevo
