= Geode Nunataks =

Mountain in Antarctica

The Geode Nunataks (69°50′S 70°5′W) are a group of small nunataks on the west side of Sibelius Glacier, immediately north of the northern extremity of the Finlandia Foothills, in northeast Alexander Island, Antarctica. They were so named by the UK Antarctic Place-Names Committee in 1977; the nunataks are composed of lava flows with abundant geodes (cavities within the rock containing quartz and calcite crystals).

The subdued, scree-covered slopes of the Geode Nunataks expose volcanic rocks of the Finlandia Formation. These volcanic rocks consist of moderately dipping (25–35°) basalt and basaltic andesite lava flows. One of these lava flows has a high magnesium content and other lava flows have elevated magnesium content. These lava flows are interbedded with a lesser number of volcaniclastic beds. In contrast, the strata of the Finlandia Formation that is exposed in the Finlandia Foothills consist of about 120-metre (390 ft) of sub-horizontal, coarse volcaniclastic polymict conglomerates. These conglomerates are interbedded with and capped by thin andesite lava flows. These strata are faulted and intruded by felsic dikes. Whole rock K–Ar ages from Geode Nunataks basaltic andesite lavas range between 59.9±1.41 and 41.3±1.01 myr. Whole-rock K–Ar ages from Finlandia Foothills basaltic andesites range between 50.2 ± 1.3 and 45.5 ± 1.3 myr. Contacts with other volcanic and nonvolcanic geologic units are not exposed.

== See also ==
- Appalachia Nunataks
- Ceres Nunataks
- Gannon Nunataks
