= Mount Pinafore =

Mountain on Alexander Island, Antarctica

Location of Alexander Island in the Antarctic Peninsula region

Mount Pinafore (69°46′S 70°52′W) is a prominent peak rising to about 1,100 m situated between Bartok Glacier and Sullivan Glacier situated in the northern portion of Alexander Island, Antarctica. It is located 6.27 km southeast of Lyubimets Nunatak, 9.26 km south-southeast of Kozhuh Peak, and surmounts Bartók Glacier to the northwest. The mountain is named by the United Kingdom Antarctic Place-Names Committee in 1977, in association with nearby Gilbert Glacier and Sullivan Glacier after the 1878 comic opera H.M.S. Pinafore.

== See also ==
- Mount Ariel
- Mount Hahn
- Mount McArthur
