= Whistle Pass =

Whistle Pass (69°47′S 70°25′W) is a snow pass at about 1,050 m at the head of Sullivan Glacier in north Alexander Island, Antarctica. The pass trends in a NE-SW direction and provides access to and from the upper part of Hampton Glacier. So named by British Antarctic Survey in 1977, because the pass falls away steeply to the southwest between high cliffs, so that the descent by sledge is fast and exhilarating as suggested by the name.

== See also ==
- Gateway Pass
- Haffner Pass
- Tufts Pass
