= Vivaldi Glacier =

Glacier in Antarctica

Vivaldi Glacier (70°47′S 69°50′W) is a glacier lying between the Colbert Mountains and the Lully Foothills, flowing south from Purcell Snowfield into the head of Schubert Inlet on the west coast of Alexander Island, Antarctica. The feature appears to be first shown on maps of the United States Antarctic Service (USAS) which photographed Alexander Island from the air in 1940. It was mapped from air photos obtained by the Ronne Antarctic Research Expedition in 1947–48, by Searle of the Falkland Islands Dependencies Survey in 1960. Named "Vivaldi Gap" by the United Kingdom Antarctic Place-Names Committee in 1961, after Antonio Vivaldi (1678–1741), Venetian composer. The name was amended to Vivaldi Glacier following review of Landsat program imagery, 1979, displaying flow lines in the feature.

== See also ==
- List of glaciers in the Antarctic
- Balakirev Glacier
- Foreman Glacier
- Hushen Glacier
