= Winifred Reuning =

American writer and editor (1953–2015)

Winifred May Reuning (January 21, 1953 – August 4, 2015) was an American writer and editor for the US National Science Foundation Polar Program. She was editor of the Antarctic Journal of the United States for decades. The Reuning Glacier in Antarctica was named after her.

== Life and career ==
Reuning was born in Elizabethtown, Pennsylvania in 1953. Her father, Wilhelm Reuning, was professor emeritus of history and former Dean of Faculty at Susquehanna University, and her mother, Ruth Reuning, was a teacher. She graduated from high school in Selinsgrove, Pennsylvania as valedictorian, and studied English literature and writing at Hobart and William Smith Colleges, graduating with a BA in English.

Reuning joined the National Science Foundation Division of Polar Programs in 1980, and was one of the first women to deploy to Antarctica. From 1980 to 2005, she was editor of the Antarctic Journal of the United States, and her name appeared on every masthead from 1980 to its final issue in 2005.

She collaborated with the US State Department to publish the first online edition of the Handbook of the Antarctic Treaty System, for which she received a National Science Foundation award. She later became the Polar Program's webmaster.

For her contribution to Antarctic science, a glacier on Alexander Island was named in her honor by the Advisory Committee on Antarctic Names to the U.S. Board on Geographic Names.

== Reuning Glacier ==
The glacier named in her honor is at 71°26′S 72°41′W, on the north side of Beethoven Peninsula, lying within the southwest portion of Alexander Island, Antarctica. The glacier flows northwest and joins Hushen Glacier in discharging into south Mendelssohn Inlet. The glacier was first mapped by the United States Geological Survey (USGS) from U.S. Navy aerial photographs taken 1967–68 and U.S. Landsat imagery taken 1972–73; it was named by Advisory Committee on Antarctic Names (US-ACAN).
