= Boccherini (disambiguation) =

Luigi Boccherini was an Italian composer of the Classical era.

Boccherini may also refer to:

- The Boccherini Quintet, a string quintet named after the composer
- Boccherini Inlet, an inlet in Antarctica also named after the composer
