= Mistral Ridge =

Antarctic geological formation

Mistral Ridge (69°33′S 68°4′W) is a mostly snow-covered ridge extending 6 nautical miles (11 km) in a north-northwest–south-southeast direction, located 5 nautical miles (9 km) east of Zonda Towers, Rymill Coast, Palmer Land, Antarctica. The ridge was photographed from the air by the U.S. Navy in 1966, and surveyed by the British Antarctic Survey in 1971–72. It was named by the UK Antarctic Place-Names Committee in 1977 after the mistral, the cold northwesterly wind of southern France. This is one of several features in the area named after winds.

== See also ==
- Pampero Pass
- Spindrift Bluff
