= Barkov =

Barkov (masculine, Russian: Барков) or Barkova (feminine, Russian: Баркова) is a Russian surname. Notable people with the surname include:

- Alexander Barkov Sr. (born 1965), Russian ice hockey player and coach
- Aleksander Barkov (born 1995), Finnish-Russian ice hockey player
- Anna Barkova (1901–1976), Russian Soviet poet, journalist and writer
- Dmitry Barkov (footballer) (born 1992), Russian footballer
- Dmitri Barkov (sport shooter) (1880–?), Russian sport shooter
- Ivan Barkov (c. 1732–1768), Russian poet and writer
- Roman Barkov, Barkov's Forces in Call of Duty: Modern Warfare
- Ulyana Barkova (1906–1991), Russian farm worker

== See also ==
- Barkov Glacier, glacier of Antarctica
