= Kozhuh Peak =

Peak on Alexander Island, Antarctica

Location of Alexander Island in the Antarctic Peninsula region

Satellite image of Alexander Island

Kozhuh Peak (Bulgarian: връх Кожух, romanized: vrah Kozhuh, IPA: [ˈvrɤx koˈʒux]) is the ice-covered peak rising to 1711 m on the west side of Elgar Uplands, northern Alexander Island in Antarctica. It surmounts Delius Glacier to the north and Bartók Glacier to the south-southwest.

The feature is named after the extinct volcano of Mount Kozhuh, Southwestern Bulgaria.

== Location ==
Kozhuh Peak is located at 69°40′42″S 70°55′17″W, 9.26 km north-northwest of Mount Pinafore, 8.92 km northeast of Appalachia Nunataks and 19.1 km southeast of Shaw Nunatak.

== Maps ==
- British Antarctic Territory. Scale 1:200000 topographic map. DOS 610 – W 69 70. Tolworth, UK, 1971
- Antarctic Digital Database (ADD). Scale 1:250000 topographic map of Antarctica. Scientific Committee on Antarctic Research (SCAR). Since 1993, regularly upgraded and updated
