= Forefinger Point =

Forefinger Point (67°37′S 48°4′E) is a prominent rock point between McKinnon Island and Rayner Glacier on the coast of Enderby Land, Antarctica. It was plotted from air photos taken from Australian National Antarctic Research Expeditions aircraft in 1956, and was so named by the Antarctic Names Committee of Australia because in plan it resembles a pointing left hand.
