= Gateway Pass =

Mountain pass

Gateway Pass (71°40′S 68°47′W) is a mountain pass about 5 nautical miles (9 km) long lying between the mountain Astarte Horn and Offset Ridge in eastern Alexander Island, Antarctica. It was mapped by the Directorate of Overseas Surveys from satellite imagery supplied by the U.S. National Aeronautics and Space Administration in cooperation with the U.S. Geological Survey, and was so named by the UK Antarctic Place-Names Committee because the feature serves as a "gateway" giving access to the interior of Alexander Island from the head of Venus Glacier.

== See also ==
- Quinault Pass
- Snick Pass
- Tufts Pass
