= Walter Glacier =

Glacier in Antarctica

Walter Glacier (69°17′S 70°21′W) is a glacier flowing east-northeast, merging with the south side of Moran Glacier to enter Schokalsky Bay, in the northeast portion of Alexander Island, Antarctica. The glacier was named by the Advisory Committee on Antarctic Names for Lieutenant Commander Howard J. Walter, U.S. Navy, LC-130 aircraft commander, Squadron VXE-6, Operation Deepfreeze, 1970 and 1971.

== See also ==
- List of glaciers in the Antarctic
- Coulter Glacier
- Foreman Glacier
- Grotto Glacier
