= Spartan Glacier =

Glacier in Antarctica

Spartan Glacier (71°3′S 68°20′W) is a short valley glacier lying between Callisto Cliffs and Tombaugh Cliffs on the east side of Alexander Island, Antarctica. The glacier was first mapped by the Overseas Surveys Directorate from satellite imagery supplied by U.S. National Aeronautics and Space Administration in cooperation with U.S. Geological Survey. Named by United Kingdom Antarctic Place-Names Committee after the British dog team known as "The Spartans," used in ascending this glacier, 1969. This is one of the few glaciers in Antarctica to be named after a dog team.

== See also ==
- List of glaciers in the Antarctic
- Arensky Glacier
- Lennon Glacier
- Toynbee Glacier
