= Moran Glacier =

Glacier in Antarctica

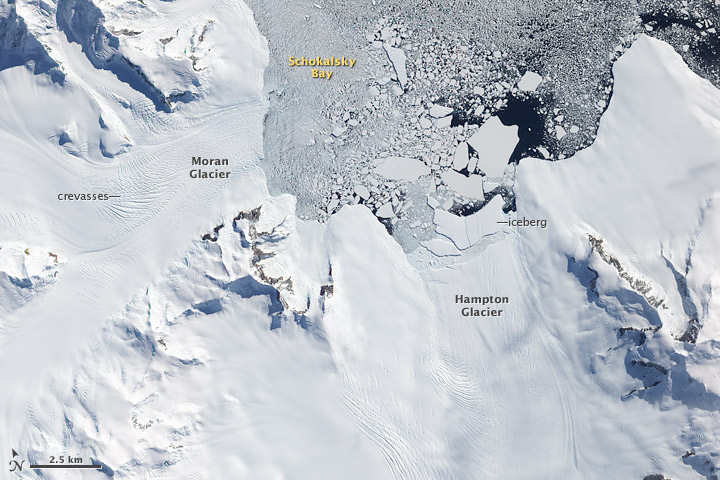
Moran Glacier and Hampton Glacier entering Schokalsky Bay.

The Moran Glacier (69°14′S 70°16′W) is a glacier 10 nautical miles (18 km) long, joined at the south side by Walter Glacier, flowing east into Schokalsky Bay, in the northeast portion of Alexander Island, Antarctica. Photographed from the air by Ronne Antarctic Research Expedition (RARE), 1947–48, and surveyed by Falkland Islands Dependencies Survey (FIDS), 1948–50. Named by Advisory Committee on Antarctic Names (US-ACAN) for Commander Clifford D. Moran, U.S. Navy, aircraft pilot, Squadron VXE-6, U.S. Navy Operation Deep Freeze, 1966 and 1977.

== See also ==
- Asafiev Glacier
- Coulter Glacier
- Mikado Glacier
