= Harvey Islands =

Islands in Antarctica

- Location within Antarctica

Geography
- Location: Antarctica
- Coordinates: 67°43′S 45°33′E

Administration
- Administered under the Antarctic Treaty System

Demographics
- Population: Uninhabited

The Harvey Islands are a pair of small islands on the western side of Freeth Bay in Enderby Land, East Antarctica. They lie at coordinates approximately 67° 43' S, 45° 33' E, and were first mapped from aerial photographs captured by Australian National Antarctic Research Expeditions aircraft in 1956.

The islands were named by the Antarctic Names Committee of Australia after Ross Harvey, a radio officer at Wilkes Station in 1959. They are listed in the SCAR Composite Gazetteer of Antarctica.

== See also ==
- List of Antarctic and sub-Antarctic islands
