= Lewis Snowfield =

Snowfield in Antarctica

Lewis Snowfield (71°25′S 71°20′W) is a low and undulating snowfield lying south of Holoviak Glacier and east of the Franck Nunataks in the southwest portion of Alexander Island, Antarctica. It extends westward from the Walton Mountains to the Beethoven Peninsula and northward from the Bach Ice Shelf to the Wilkins Ice Shelf. The snowfield was named by the UK Antarctic Place-Names Committee for Ernest G. Lewis, Governor of the Falkland Islands, 1971–74.

== See also ==
- Nichols Snowfield
- Satellite Snowfield
