= Hays Glacier =

Glacier in Antarctica

- Location within Antarctica
- Location: Enderby Land
- Coordinates: 67°40′S 46°18′E
- Thickness: unknown
- Terminus: Spooner Bay
- Status: unknown

Hays Glacier (67°40′S 46°18′E) is a glacier flowing north into the head of Spooner Bay, Enderby Land, Antarctica. It was plotted from air photos taken by the Australian National Antarctic Research Expeditions (ANARE) in 1956, and was named for J. Hays, a United States observer with the ANARE (Thala Dan, 1961) which made a landing nearby.

- Latitude: 674000S
- Longitude: 0461800E
- Description: Glacier flowing N into the head of Spooner Bay, Enderby Land. Plotted from air photos taken by Australian National Antarctic Research Expeditions (ANARE) in 1956. Named for J. Hays, United States observer with the Australian National Antarctic Research Expeditions (ANARE) (Thala Dan, 1961) which made a landing nearby.

== See also ==
- List of glaciers in the Antarctic
- Glaciology
