= Fluted Rock =

Fluted Rock (67°34′S 46°21′E) is a column-like rock standing on the northeast side of Spooner Bay in Enderby Land, Antarctica. It was plotted from air photos taken from Australian National Antarctic Research Expeditions (ANARE) aircraft in 1956. The ANARE (Thala Dan) visited the rock in February, 1961 and so named it because of its fluted appearance when viewed from the sea.
