= Appalachia Nunataks =

Group of nunataks on Alexander Island, Antarctica

Location of Alexander Island in the Antarctic Peninsula region

The Appalachia Nunataks (69°44′S 71°4′W) are a group of nunataks rising to about 600 metres (2,000 ft) on the west side of the Elgar Uplands, Alexander Island, Antarctica. They are situated 5.62 km southwest of Lyubimets Nunatak, 9 km southwest of Kozhuh Peak and 9.65 km north of Atanasov Ridge, and surmount Nichols Snowfield to the west. The feature was named by the United Kingdom Antarctic Place-Names Committee in 1977 after Appalachia, the 1902 Frederick Delius composition, in association with Delius Glacier and the names of composers in this area.
