= Bushell Bluff =

Place in Antarctica

Bushell Bluff (71°28′S 67°36′W) is a bluff on the west coast of Palmer Land, immediately south of Norman Glacier. It was named by the UK Antarctic Place-Names Committee for Tony Bushell, British Antarctic Survey, Base Commander at Stonington], 1969–70.
