= Reuning Glacier =

Glacier in Antarctica

Reuning Glacier (71°26′S 72°41′W) is a glacier situated on the north side of Beethoven Peninsula, lying within the southwest portion of Alexander Island, Antarctica. The glacier flows in a northwest direction and joins Hushen Glacier in discharging into south Mendelssohn Inlet. The glacier was first mapped by the United States Geological Survey (USGS) from U.S. Navy aerial photographs taken 1967-68 and U.S. Landsat imagery taken 1972–73. Named by Advisory Committee on Antarctic Names (US-ACAN) for Winifred M. Reuning, Office of Polar Programs, National Science Foundation (NSF), Editor, Antarctic Journal of the United States, from 1980 to 2015.

== See also ==
- Alyabiev Glacier
- Palestrina Glacier
- Yozola Glacier
