= Holoviak Glacier =

Glacier in Antarctica

Holoviak Glacier (71°22′S 72°9′W) is a glacier flowing west into the head of Mendelssohn Inlet, facing towards the Wilkins Ice Shelf on the north side of the Beethoven Peninsula, lying in the southwestern portion of Alexander Island, Antarctica. It was mapped by the United States Geological Survey from U.S. Navy aerial photographs taken 1967–68 and from Landsat imagery taken 1972–73, and was named by the Advisory Committee on Antarctic Names for Judy C. Holoviak, technical editor, 1964–77, of the Antarctic Research Series, published by the American Geophysical Union, and director of publications for the Union from 1978.

== See also ==
- Asafiev Glacier
- Clarsach Glacier
- Iliev Glacier
- Lewis Snowfield
