= Bennett Dome =

Peninsula in Antarctica

Bennett Dome (71°48′S 73°3′W) is a rounded snow-covered peninsula on the south side of Beethoven Peninsula, Alexander Island, Antarctica. rising to about 460 metres (1,500 ft) between Weber Inlet and Boccherini Inlet. It was photographed from the air by the Ronne Antarctic Research Expedition in 1947 and roughly mapped from the photographs by D. Searle of the Falkland Islands Dependencies Survey in 1960. It was mapped definitively by the United States Geological Survey from U.S. Navy aerial photographs taken 1967–68 and from Landsat imagery taken 1972–73, and named by the Advisory Committee on Antarctic Names for Joseph E. Bennett, the head of the Polar Coordination and Information Section, Division of Polar Programs, National Science Foundation, 1976–86. Bennett Dome is one of the eight peninsulas of Alexander Island.
