= Iliev Glacier =

Glacier in Antarctica

- Location of Alexander Island in the Antarctic Peninsula region

- Location within Antarctica
- Location: Alexander Island
- Coordinates: 69°28′25″S 71°35′30″W
- Length: 3 nmi (6 km; 3 mi)
- Width: 1 nmi (2 km; 1 mi)
- Thickness: unknown
- Terminus: Lazarev Bay
- Status: unknown

Iliev Glacier (Bulgarian: Илиев ледник, romanized: Iliev lednik, IPA: [iˈliɛf ˈlɛdnik]) is the 5 km long and 1.5 km wide glacier in the Lassus Mountains in the northern portion of Alexander Island, Antarctica. It drains the northwest slopes of Mount Wilbye, the east slopes of Vittoria Buttress and the west slopes of Galerius Peak to flow into Lazarev Bay just south of the terminus of Palestrina Glacier.

The glacier is named after the Bulgarian composer Diko Iliev (1898-1984).

== Location ==
Iliev Glacier is located at 69°28′25″S 71°35′30″W.

== See also ==
- Lennon Glacier
- Palestrina Glacier
- Rosselin Glacier

== Maps ==
- British Antarctic Territory. Scale 1:200000 topographic map No. 3127. DOS 610 - W 69 70. Tolworth, UK, 1971.
- Antarctic Digital Database (ADD). Scale 1:250000 topographic map of Antarctica. Scientific Committee on Antarctic Research (SCAR). Since 1993, regularly upgraded and updated.
