= Block Mountain (Antarctica) =

Mountain on Alexander Island, Antarctica

- Location within Antarctica

Naming
- Language of name: English

Block Mountain (70°28′S 68°52′W) is a prominent block-shaped mountain with a height of 1,460 m. The feature juts east from the Douglas Range of Alexander Island immediately south of Transition Glacier in Antarctica. Its north, east, and south sides features sharply defined corners which are nearly vertical. From its northeast corner, a low spur connects this mountain with Tilt Rock.

The mountain was first photographed from the air on November 23, 1935, by Lincoln Ellsworth and mapped from these photos by W.L.G. Joerg. It was roughly surveyed in 1936 by the British Graham Land Expedition (BGLE) and resurveyed in 1949 by the Falkland Islands Dependencies Survey (FIDS). The descriptive name was given by FIDS.
