= Lully Foothills =

Topographic feature on Alexander Island, Antarctica

The Lully Foothills (70°49′S 69°38′W) are a large group of peaks and nunataks extending 15 nautical miles (28 km) in a northeast–southwest direction between Vivaldi Glacier and the LeMay Range in the west-central part of Alexander Island, Antarctica. Apparently first seen from the air and roughly mapped by the United States Antarctic Service in 1940, they were remapped in detail from air photos taken by the Ronne Antarctic Research Expedition, 1947–48, by D. Searle of the Falkland Islands Dependencies Survey in 1960. The foothills were named by the UK Antarctic Place-Names Committee after Jean-Baptiste Lully, a French composer.

== See also ==
- Finlandia Foothills
