= Delius (surname) =

Delius is a surname. Notable people with the surname include:

- Frederick Delius (1862–1934), English composer
- Friedrich Christian Delius (1943–2022), German writer
- Fritz Delius (1890–1966), German actor
- Ernst von Delius (1912–1937), German racing car driver
- Nicolaus Delius (1813–1888), German philologist
- Tobias Delius (born 1964), English jazz musician

Fictional characters:

- Max Delius, fictional character in the 1992 novel The Discovery of Heaven

== See also ==
- Deliu, another surname
