= Foreman Glacier =

Glacier in Antarctica

Location of Alexander Island in the Antarctic Peninsula region

Satellite image of Alexander Island

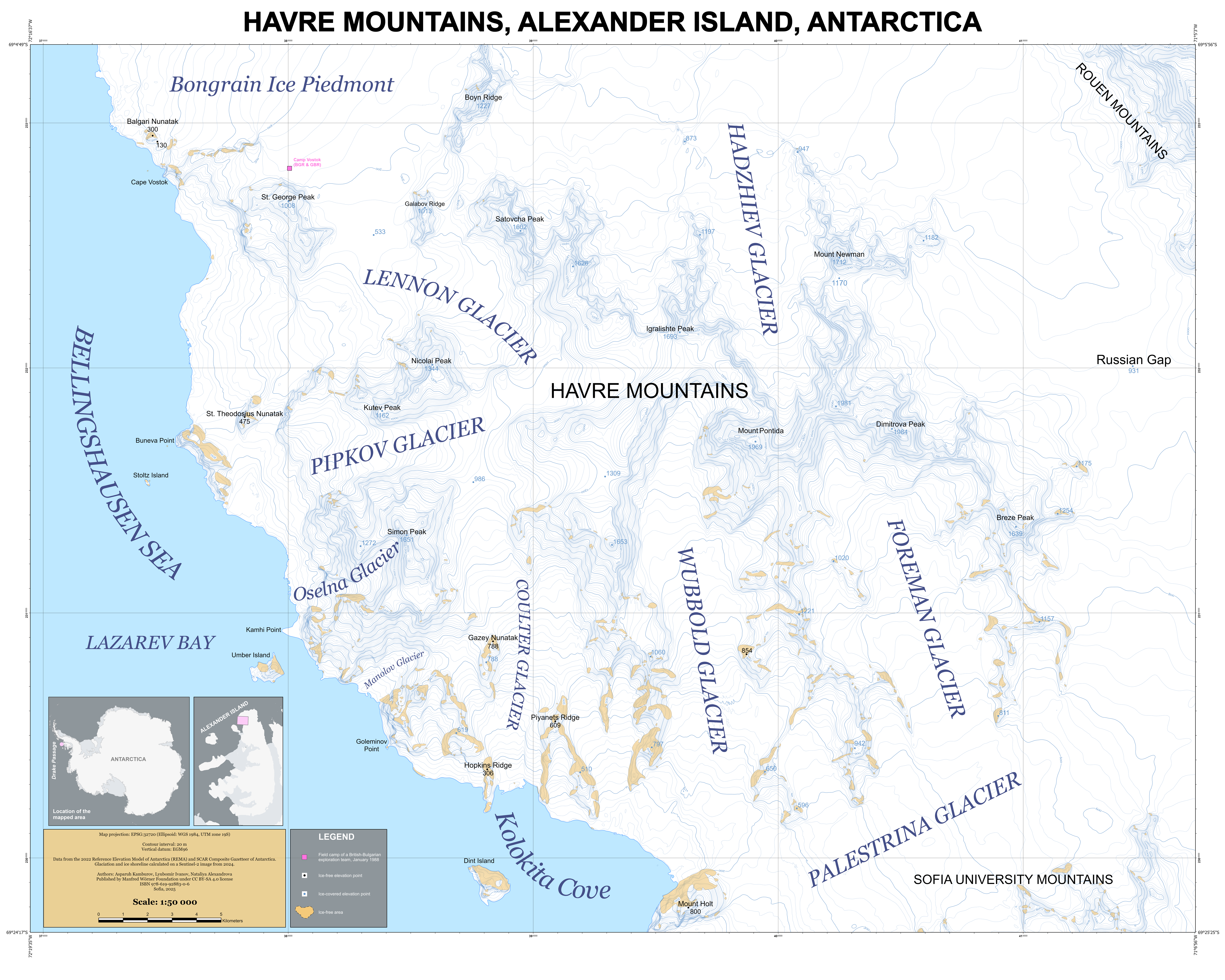
Map of Havre Mountains, Alexander Island in Antarctica

Forman Glacier (69°18′S 71°22′W) is a glacier flowing south-southeast from the Havre Mountains in the northern portion of Alexander Island, Antarctica. It drains the southwest slopes of Dimitrova Peak and the west slopes of Breze Peak and flows into Palestrina Glacier north of Balan Ridge in Sofia University Mountains. The glacier was surveyed by the British Antarctic Survey (BAS), 1975–76, and was named by the UK Antarctic Place-Names Committee in 1980 after David Alexander Foreman, a BAS aircraft mechanic at Adelaide Station, 1973–76.

== See also ==
- Hushen Glacier
- Mikado Glacier
- Transition Glacier
