= Rosselin Glacier =

Glacier in Antarctica

The Rosselin Glacier (69°16′S 70°53′W) is a glacier flowing southwest from the southern extremity of the Rouen Mountains into Palestrina Glacier in the northern portion of Alexander Island, Antarctica. The glacier was first surveyed by the British Antarctic Survey in 1975–76. The feature was named by the United Kingdom Antarctic Place-Names Committee in late 1980 after F. Rosselin, chief engineer, FAE, 1908–10, in association with other FAE names in this area.

== See also ==
- Coulter Glacier
- Gerontius Glacier
- Paulus Glacier
