= Sedgwick Glacier =

Glacier in Antarctica

Sedgwick Glacier (69°51′S 69°22′W) is a glacier on the east coast of Alexander Island, Antarctica, 7 nautical miles (13 km) long and 2 nautical miles (3.7 km) wide, which flows east from the foot of Mount Stephenson into George VI Sound immediately north of Mount Huckle. The glacier was first roughly surveyed in 1936 by the British Graham Land Expedition under Rymill. Resurveyed in 1948 by the Falkland Islands Dependencies Survey and named by them for Adam Sedgwick, English geologist and professor of geology at the University of Cambridge, 1818–73.

== See also ==
- Eros Glacier
- Grotto Glacier
- Transition Glacier
