= Hannan Ice Shelf =

Ice shelf in Antarctica

Location in Antarctica

Hannan Ice Shelf (67°36′S 47°35′E), is an 18-mile-wide ice shelf on the coast of Enderby Land, Antarctica. The ice shelf is nourished by Molle and Kichenside Glaciers and borders McKinnon Island on all but its north side. Photographed from Australian National Antarctic Research Expeditions (ANARE) aircraft in 1956. First visited in October 1957 by an Australian National Antarctic Research Expeditions (ANARE) party led by B.H. Stinear. Named by ANCA for F.T. Hannan, meteorologist at Mawson Station in 1957.

== See also ==
- Ice shelves of Antarctica
