= Senouque Spurs =

Senouque Spurs (69°5′S 71°11′W) is a group of spurs rising to about 1,250 m and extending northwest from the Rouen Mountains to the Bongrain Ice Piedmont. Photographed from the air by the Ronne Antarctic Research Expedition in 1947, roughly mapped from air photographs by the Falkland Islands Dependencies Survey in 1959, and surveyed by the British Antarctic Survey in 1975–76. The feature was named by United Kingdom Antarctic Place-Names Committee in 1980 after Albert Senouque, magnetician and photographer on FAE, 1908–10, in association with other FAE names in this area.

== See also ==
- Mahler Spur
- Pearson Spur
- Prague Spur
