= Minerva Glacier =

Glacier in Ross Dependency, Antarctica

Minerva Glacier (79°34′12″S 157°15′00″E) is a tongue-shaped glacier that flows northwest into the valley between Tentacle Ridge and Gorgons Head in the Cook Mountains. It was named by the New Zealand Antarctic Place-Names Committee after the goddess Minerva, in association with the names from Greek mythology grouped in this area.
