= Spindrift Bluff =

Spindrift Bluff (69°35′S 68°2′W) is an east–west-trending bluff (about 700 m) located just south of Mistral Ridge in northwest Palmer Land. Surveyed by British Antarctic Survey (BAS), 1971–72, and was named by United Kingdom Antarctic Place-Names Committee (UK-APC), 1977. A local wind blows in this area and spindrift sweeps from the bluff, when it is calm elsewhere.
