= Carlson Glacier =

Glacier in Antarctica

Carlson Glacier (69°25′S 68°3′W) is a glacier, 9 nautical miles (17 km) long, flowing northward from between Mount Edgell and the Relay Hills into Wordie Ice Shelf, Fallières Coast. It was photographed from the air by the U.S. Navy in 1966, and surveyed by the British Antarctic Survey between 1970 and 1973. It was named by the Advisory Committee on Antarctic Names after Captain (ranked Commander at the time of naming) Burford A. Carlson, U.S. Navy, Staff Meteorologist, Naval Support Force, Antarctica, Operation Deep Freeze, 1970 and 1971.
