= Pampero Pass =

Pampero Pass (69°31′S 68°7′W) is a snow pass at about 750 m, running north–south between Mount Edgell and Mistral Ridge in northwest Palmer Land. The pass provides a sledge route between Wordie Ice Shelf and Eureka Glacier. Named by the United Kingdom Antarctic Place-Names Committee (UK-APC) in association with other wind names in the area. Pampero is the cold wind that blows from the south Andes to the Atlantic Ocean.
