= Gerontius Glacier =

Glacier in Antarctica

Gerontius Glacier (69°31′S 70°34′W) is a glacier flowing north from the Elgar Uplands into Tufts Pass in northern Alexander Island, Antarctica. It was so named by the UK Antarctic Place-Names Committee in 1977, association with the nearby uplands, from The Dream of Gerontius, a work for chorus, solo voices and orchestra by Edward Elgar. It is named after the oratorio The Dream of Gerontius by the British composer Edward Elgar from 1900.

== See also ==
- Clarsach Glacier
- Lennon Glacier
- Sedgwick Glacier
