= Isbrecht Glacier =

Glacier in Antarctica

- Map of Thurston Island

- Location within Antarctica
- Type: tributary
- Location: Ellsworth Land
- Coordinates: 72°14′S 100°46′W
- Thickness: unknown
- Terminus: Cox Glacier
- Status: unknown

Isbrecht Glacier (72°14′S 100°46′W) is a small glacier flowing south from Thurston Island in Antarctica between Cox Glacier and Hale Glacier. It was named by the Advisory Committee on Antarctic Names after JoAnn Isbrecht of the United States Geological Survey (USGS), Flagstaff, Arizona, a satellite image processing specialist who was part of the USGS team that compiled the 1:5,000,000-scale Advanced Very High Resolution Radiometer maps of Antarctica and the 1:250,000-scale Landsat image maps of the Siple Coast area in the 1990s.

== See also ==
- List of glaciers in the Antarctic
- Glaciology

== Maps ==
- Thurston Island – Jones Mountains. 1:500000 Antarctica Sketch Map. US Geological Survey, 1967.
- Antarctic Digital Database (ADD). Scale 1:250000 topographic map of Antarctica. Scientific Committee on Antarctic Research (SCAR). Since 1993, regularly upgraded and updated.
