= Nueve de Julio Glacier =

Glacier in Graham Land, Antarctica

Nueve de Julio Glacier (68°26′00″S 66°52′00″W) is a broad glacier that flows southwestward from Black Thumb and adjoining ridges into the north part of the Bertrand Ice Piedmont in Rymill Bay on the Fallières Coast. It was named by Argentina in 1978 to honor its National Day of Independence, July 9.
