= Zonda Towers =

- Location within Antarctica

Highest point
- Elevation: 825 m (2,707 ft)
- Coordinates: 69°34′S 68°18′W

Geography
- Location: Palmer Land, Antarctica

Zonda Towers are an east–west trending rock ridge, 4 miles (6 km) long, between Zonda Glacier and Eureka Glacier on the Rymill Coast, Palmer Land. The eastern section of the ridge rises to 825 m and is notable for four rock towers. The feature was photographed from the air by the U.S. Navy, 1966, and was surveyed by British Antarctic Survey (BAS), 1971–72. Named by United Kingdom Antarctic Place-Names Committee (UK-APC) in 1977 in association with Zonda Glacier.
