= Assender Glacier =

Glacier in Enderby Land, Antarctica

- Location within Antarctica
- Location: Enderby Land
- Coordinates: 67°36′S 46°25′E
- Thickness: unknown
- Terminus: Spooner Bay
- Status: unknown

Assender Glacier is a glacier flowing west into Spooner Bay in Enderby Land, Antarctica. It was plotted from air photos taken from Australian National Antarctic Research Expeditions aircraft in 1956, and named by the Antarctic Names Committee of Australia for Pilot Officer Ken J. Assender, RAAF, pilot at Mawson Station in 1959.

== See also ==
- List of glaciers in the Antarctic
- Glaciology
