= Shuman Glacier =

Glacier in Marie Byrd Land, Antarctica

Shuman Glacier (75°15′S 139°30′W) is a glacier about 6 miles (10 km) long draining through the Ruppert Coast north of Strauss Glacier. Named by Advisory Committee on Antarctic Names (US-ACAN) after Christopher A. Shuman, faculty, Earth System Science Interdisciplinary Center, University of Maryland, field and theoretical researcher in the West Antarctic Ice Stream area from the 1990s to the present.
