= Park Glacier (Antarctica) =

Glacier in Marie Byrd Land, Antarctica

- Interactive map of Park Glacier
- Location: Bear Peninsula
- Coordinates: 74°20′0″S 110°38′0″W

The Park Glacier is a glacier located on the northern part of the Bear Peninsula of Marie Byrd Land in Antarctica. It flows to the sea along the west side of the Gurnon Peninsula. It is named for Chung G. Park, ionosphere physics researcher at Byrd Station in 1966.
