= Sibelius Glacier =

Glacier on Alexander Island, Antarctica

Sibelius Glacier (69°55′S 70°5′W) is a glacier, 12 miles (19 km) long and 6 miles (10 km) wide, flowing south into the Mozart Ice Piedmont 10 miles (16 km) southwest of Mount Stephenson in the northern portion of Alexander Island, Antarctica. The glacier was first sighted from the air by the British Graham Land Expedition in 1937. Mapped from air photos taken by the Ronne Antarctic Research Expedition in 1947–48, by Searle of the Falkland Islands Dependencies Survey in 1960. This feature was named by the United Kingdom Antarctic Place-Names Committee for Jean Sibelius (1865-1957), Finnish composer.

== See also ==
- List of glaciers in the Antarctic
- Bartók Glacier
- Gilbert Glacier
- Paulus Glacier
