= Norman Glacier =

Glacier in Antarctica

Norman Glacier (71°25′S 67°30′W) is a glacier, 5 nautical miles (9 km) long, flowing southwest from Palmer Land to enter George VI Sound just north of Bushell Bluff, in Antarctica. It was named, by the United Kingdom Antarctic Place-Names Committee (UK-APC), for Shaun M. Norman, the base commander with the British Antarctic Survey (BAS) at Stonington Island from 1966 to 1968.
