= Molle Glacier =

Glacier in Enderby Land, Antarctica

- Location within Antarctica
- Location: Enderby Land
- Coordinates: 67°31′S 47°10′E
- Length: 4 nmi (7 km; 5 mi)
- Thickness: unknown
- Terminus: Hannan Ice Shelf
- Status: unknown

Molle Glacier (67°31′S 47°10′E) is a glacier, 4 nautical miles (7 km) wide, flowing north-northeast into the northern part of the Hannan Ice Shelf, Enderby Land, Antarctica. It was charted from air photos taken by Australian National Antarctic Research Expeditions in 1956, and was named by the Antarctic Names Committee of Australia for J.D. Molle, a radio officer at Davis Station in 1960.

== See also ==
- List of glaciers in the Antarctic
- Glaciology
