= Balakirev =

Balakirev is a Russian surname associated with several noble Balakirev families. Notable people with the surname include:

- Alexandra Balakireva, Russian competitive boulderer
- Ivan Balakirev (1699–1763) court jester to Peter I of Russia
- Konstantin Balakirev (1911–1980), Soviet military leader, rear admiral
- Mily Balakirev, a Russian pianist, conductor and composer
- Nikolay Balakirev (1922–2001), Soviet military pilot, Hero of the Soviet Union
