= Tilt Rock =

Tilt Rock (70°27′S 68°44′W) is an isolated rock peak, rising to about 670 m, situated 2 nautical miles (3.7 km) inland from the George VI Ice Shelf of George VI Sound and 2 nautical miles (3.7 km) northeast of Block Mountain in eastern Alexander Island, Antarctica. This rock formation was first photographed from the air on 23 November 1935, by Lincoln Ellsworth and later mapped from these photos by W.L.G. Joerg. Roughly surveyed from the ground in 1936 by the British Graham Land Expedition and resurveyed in 1948–49 by the Falkland Islands Dependencies Survey. So named by FIDS because of its tilted and possibly unstable appearance.
