= Freeth Bay =

Bay in Antarctica

Coordinates: 67°44′S 45°39′E

Freeth Bay is a 5 mi wide bay on the coast of Enderby Land, Antarctica, lying 12 mi west of Spooner Bay in Alasheyev Bight. Plotted from air photos taken by Australian National Antarctic Research Expeditions (ANARE) in 1956. First visited by the Australian National Antarctic Research Expeditions (ANARE) under D.F. Styles in February 1961 and named for the Hon. Gordon Freeth, M.P., then Australian Minister for the Interior.
