= McKinnon Island =

Island in Antarctica

- Location within Antarctica

Geography
- Location: Antarctica
- Coordinates: 67°36′S 47°35′E

Administration
- Administered under the Antarctic Treaty System

Demographics
- Population: Uninhabited

McKinnon Island is a large island, mostly ice-covered, in the Hannan Ice Shelf along the coast of Enderby Land, Antarctica. It was plotted from air photos taken by the Australian National Antarctic Research Expeditions in 1956, and was named for Graeme W. McKinnon, Geographical Officer of the Antarctic Division, Melbourne, and Secretary of the Antarctic Names Committee of Australia.

== See also ==
- List of Antarctic and sub-Antarctic islands
