= Zonda Glacier =

Glacier in Antarctica

Zonda Glacier (69°33′S 68°30′W) is a glacier about 8 miles (13 km) long, flowing west-southwest between Fohn Bastion and Zonda Towers into George VI Sound. The glacier was included in surveys by Falkland Islands Dependencies Survey (FIDS), 1948, and British Antarctic Survey (BAS), 1971–72, and was photographed from the air by the U.S. Navy, 1966. The name applied by United Kingdom Antarctic Place-Names Committee (UK-APC) in 1977 continues the theme of wind names in the area, as "zonda wind" is the Argentine name for the warm dry wind descending the east slopes of the Andes.
