= Zephyr Glacier =

Glacier in Antarctica

Zephyr Glacier 1 (69°28′S 68°36′W) is a glacier, about 8 miles (13 km) long, flowing westward from the southwest side of Mount Edgell into George VI Sound to the south of Cape Jeremy. The feature was surveyed by Falkland Islands Dependencies Survey (FIDS), 1948, and British Antarctic Survey (BAS), 1971–72; photographed from the air by U.S. Navy, 1966. Named by United Kingdom Antarctic Place-Names Committee (UK-APC) in 1977 after Zephyrus, the west wind. One of the several features in this area is named after winds.
