= Mikado Glacier =

Glacier in Antarctica

Mikado Glacier (69°53′S 70°40′W) is a glacier on the north side of Mahler Spur, flowing west-northwest into Sullivan Glacier near the junction with Gilbert Glacier in northern Alexander Island, Antarctica. The glacier was so named by the UK Antarctic Place-Names Committee in 1977 in association with nearby Gilbert Glacier and Sullivan Glacier, after the 1885 operetta The Mikado.
