= Transition Glacier =

Glacier in Antarctica

Transition Glacier (70°26′S 68°49′W) is a glacier extending along the east coast of Alexander Island, 8 nautical miles (15 km) long and 2 nautical miles (3.7 km) wide, which flows east into the George VI Ice Shelf that occupies George VI Sound along the north side of Block Mountain and Tilt Rock. The glacier was first photographed from the air on November 23, 1935, by Lincoln Ellsworth and mapped from these photos by W.L.G. Joerg. Surveyed in 1949 by the Falkland Islands Dependencies Survey, and so named by them because this glacier marks the transition between igneous rocks to the north and sedimentary rocks to the south.

== See also ==
- Balakirev Glacier
- Eros Glacier
- Lennon Glacier
