= Haas Glacier =

Glacier in Antarctica

- Location within Antarctica
- Type: steep tributary
- Location: Ross Dependency
- Coordinates: 85°45′S 164°55′W
- Thickness: unknown
- Terminus: Bowman Glacier
- Status: unknown

Haas Glacier (85°45′S 164°55′W) is a steep tributary glacier draining northward from Rawson Plateau to enter the south side of Bowman Glacier, in the Queen Maud Mountains of Antarctica. It was mapped by the United States Geological Survey from surveys and U.S. Navy air photos, 1960–64, and was named by the Advisory Committee on Antarctic Names for Charles G. Haas, a meteorologist in the South Pole Station winter party, 1960.

== See also ==
- List of glaciers in the Antarctic
- Glaciology
