= Quinault Pass =

Coordinates: 70°49′S 69°28′W

Quinault Pass is a snow pass trending in a north–south direction lying between the Lully Foothills and the LeMay Range in central portion of Alexander Island, Antarctica. The feature was photographed from the air by Ronne Antarctic Research Expedition (RARE), 1947–48, and mapped from these photographs by D. Searle of Falkland Islands Dependencies Survey (FIDS), 1960, it was named in association with the nearby Lully Foothills by the United Kingdom Antarctic Place-Names Committee (UK-APC), 1977, after the French dramatist Philippe Quinault, (1635–1688).
