= Pristimantis delius =

Conservation status
- Data Deficient (IUCN 3.1)

Scientific classification
- Kingdom: Animalia
- Phylum: Chordata
- Class: Amphibia
- Order: Anura
- Clade: Brachycephaloidea
- Family: Craugastoridae
- Genus: Pristimantis
- Species: P. delius

Binomial name
- Pristimantis delius (Duellman & Mendelson, 1995)

Synonyms
- Eleutherodactylus delius Duellman & Mendelson, 1995

Species of frog

Pristimantis delius is a species of frog in the family Strabomantidae. It is found in the Amazon basin of Ecuador, northern Peru, and western Brazil (Acre state). Its natural habitat is tropical moist lowland forest.
