= Siegfried Glacier =

Glacier in Palmer Land, Antarctica

Siegfried Glacier (69°33′00″S 72°28′00″W) is a glacier flowing east-southeast into Lazarev Bay, south of Mirnyy Peak on Rothschild Island. It was named by the UK Antarctic Place-names Committee in association with the Wagner Ice Piedmont after Siegfried, the third part of the four-part festival play Der Ring des Nibelungen (1826) by Wagner.
