= Sandhøhallet Glacier =

Glacier in Antarctica

- Location of Queen Maud Land in Antarctica

- Location within Antarctica
- Location: Queen Maud Land
- Coordinates: 71°52′S 9°50′E
- Thickness: unknown
- Terminus: Princess Astrid Coast
- Status: unknown

Sandhøhallet Glacier is a small glacier flowing southeast from the southern slopes of Sandhø Heights in the Conrad Mountains of Queen Maud Land. It was mapped by Norway from air photos and surveys by the Norwegian Antarctic Expedition of 1956–60, and named Sandhøhallet ("the sand heights slope").

== See also ==
- List of glaciers in the Antarctic
- Glaciology
