= Gorgons Head =

Mountain peak in Antarctica

Gorgons Head (79°33′S 157°30′E) is a peak southeast of Mount Hughes in the Cook Mountains of Antarctica. The peak is sandstone with dolerite intrusions and is a sharp summit ridge. It was named after the Gorgons, three winged creatures of Greek mythology only one of which (Medusa) could be killed by having its head cut off.
