= Wagner Ice Piedmont =

Wagner Ice Piedmont (69°28′S 72°38′W) is an ice piedmont, 9 nautical miles (17 km) long in a NW-SE direction and 4 nautical miles (7 km) wide, overlying the southwest part of Rothschild Island.

Observed and photographed from the air by the United States Antarctic Service (USAS), 1939–41. Mapped from air photos taken by the Ronne Antarctic Research Expedition (RARE), 1947–48, by Searle of the Falkland Islands Dependencies Survey (FIDS) in 1960.

Named by the United Kingdom Antarctic Place-Names Committee (UK-APC) for Richard Wagner (1813–1883), German composer.
