= Zinberg Glacier =

Glacier in Antarctica

- Map of Thurston Island.

- Location within Antarctica
- Location: Thurston Island; Ellsworth Land
- Coordinates: 72°21′00″S 96°4′00″W
- Thickness: unknown
- Status: unknown

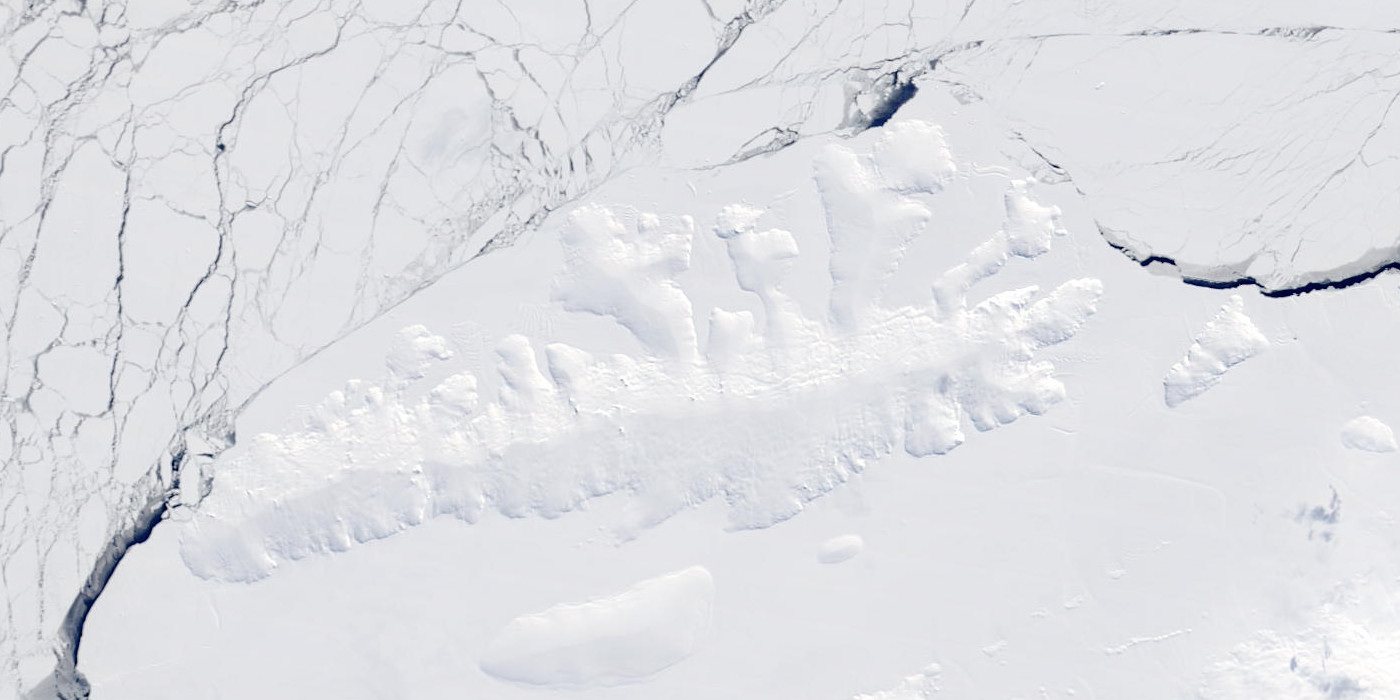
Satellite image of Thurston Island

Zinberg Glacier (72°21′S 96°4′W) is a glacier in east Thurston Island; it flows east-northeast into Morgan Inlet between Tierney Peninsula and the promontory ending in Ryan Point. Named by Advisory Committee on Antarctic Names (US-ACAN) after Cpl. E. Zinberg, a U.S. Army photographer in the Eastern Group of U.S. Navy Operation Highjump. The operation obtained aerial photographs of Thurston Island and adjacent coastal areas in 1946–47.

== See also ==
- List of glaciers in the Antarctic
- Glaciology

== Maps ==
- Thurston Island – Jones Mountains. 1:500000 Antarctica Sketch Map. US Geological Survey, 1967.
- Antarctic Digital Database (ADD). Scale 1:250000 topographic map of Antarctica. Scientific Committee on Antarctic Research (SCAR). Since 1993, regularly upgraded and updated.
