= Acosta Glacier =

Glacier in Antarctica

- Location within Antarctica
- Location: Ellsworth Land
- Coordinates: 71°58′S 100°55′W
- Length: 2 nmi (4 km; 2 mi)
- Thickness: unknown
- Terminus: east of Dyer Point
- Status: unknown

Acosta Glacier (71°58′S 100°55′W) is a glacier about 2 miles (3 km) long flowing north from Thurston Island just east of Dyer Point in Antarctica. It was named by the Advisory Committee on Antarctic Names (US-ACAN) after Alex V. Acosta of the United States Geological Survey (USGS) in Flagstaff, Arizona. He is a computer and graphic specialist, and was part of the USGS team that compiled the 1:5,000,000-scale Advanced Very High Resolution Radiometer satellite image maps of Antarctica and the 1:250,000-scale Landsat image maps of the Siple Coast area in the 1990s.

== See also ==
- List of glaciers in the Antarctic
- Glaciology
