= Deliu =

Deliu is a surname. Notable people with the surname include:

- Ardit Deliu (born 1997), Albanian footballer
- Tudor Deliu (1955–2023), Moldovan politician

== See also ==
- Delius
