= Gilchrist Glacier =

Glacier in Antarctica

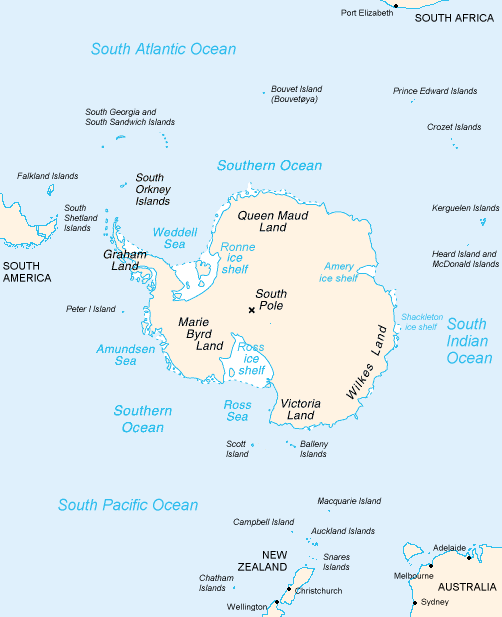
- Map of Antarctica, with Wilkes Land slightly to the right

- Location within Antarctica
- Location: Wilkes Land
- Coordinates: 66°07′S 114°06′E
- Length: 9 nmi (17 km; 10 mi)
- Thickness: unknown
- Terminus: Budd Coast
- Status: unknown

Gilchrist Glacier (66°7′S 114°6′E) is a short channel glacier flowing to Budd Coast 9 nautical miles (17 km) northwest of Fox Glacier. Delineated by G.D. Blodgett (1955) from aerial photographs taken by U.S. Navy Operation Highjump (1946–47). Named by Advisory Committee on Antarctic Names (US-ACAN) after Edward Gilchrist, Acting Surgeon on the sloop Wilkes.

== See also ==
- List of glaciers in the Antarctic
- Glaciology
