= Föhn Bastion =

Mountain in Antarctica

Föhn Bastion (69°31′S 68°36′W) is a landmark mountain rising to 915 metres (3,000 ft) about 8 nautical miles (15 km) southeast of Cape Jeremy, on the Rymill Coast of Palmer Land, Antarctica. It was named by the UK Antarctic Place-Names Committee in 1977 in association with other wind names in this area. The Föhn is the descending warm wind common in the European Alps.
