= Kichenside Glacier =

Glacier in Enderby Land, Antarctica

- Location within Antarctica
- Location: Enderby Land
- Coordinates: 67°46′S 47°36′E
- Length: 15 nmi (28 km; 17 mi)
- Width: 5 nmi (9 km; 6 mi)
- Thickness: unknown
- Terminus: Hannan Ice Shelf
- Status: unknown

Kichenside Glacier (67°46′S 47°36′E) is a glacier, 15 nautical miles (28 km) long and 3 to 5 nautical miles (6 to 9 km) wide, flowing northeast into the southern part of the Hannan Ice Shelf on the coast of Enderby Land, Antarctica. It was charted from air photos taken from an Australian National Antarctic Research Expeditions aircraft in 1956, and was named by the Antarctic Names Committee of Australia for Squadron Leader James C. Kichenside, RAAF, officer commanding the Antarctic Flight at Mawson Station in 1960.

== See also ==
- List of glaciers in the Antarctic
- Glaciology
