= Mahler Spur =

Mahler Spur (69°48′S 70°52′W) is a rock spur, 6 nautical miles (11 km) long, extending west into the Mozart Ice Piedmont 7 nautical miles (13 km) east of the south end of the Debussy Heights, in the northern part of Alexander Island, Antarctica. It was first seen from the air and roughly mapped by the British Graham Land Expedition in 1937. The spur was accurately delineated from air photos taken by the Ronne Antarctic Research Expedition, 1947–48, by D. Searle of the Falkland Islands Dependencies Survey in 1960. It was named by the UK Antarctic Place-Names Committee for Gustav Mahler, the Austrian composer.

== See also ==
- Pearson Spur
- Senouque Spurs
