= Vittoria Buttress =

Cliff in Antarctica

Vittoria Buttress (69°23′S 71°47′W) is a conspicuous rock cliff, rising to about 750 m, overlooking the southeast side of Lazarev Bay and forming the northwest extremity of the Lassus Mountains in northern Alexander Island, Antarctica. The feature was first mapped from air photographs taken by the Ronne Antarctic Research Expedition in 1947–48, by Searle of the Falkland Islands Dependencies Survey in 1960. Named by the United Kingdom Antarctic Place-Names Committee for Tomas Luis de Victoria (1535–1611), Spanish composer.
