= Purcell Snowfield =

Snowfield in Antarctica

Purcell Snowfield (70°29′S 69°55′W) is a snowfield, 15 nautical miles (28 km) wide, lying between the east portion of the Colbert Mountains and the west side of the Douglas Range in the central part of Alexander Island, Antarctica. The feature was mapped from air photos taken by the Ronne Antarctic Research Expedition (RARE), 1947–48, by Searle of the Falkland Islands Dependencies Survey (FIDS) in 1960. The snowfield was named by the United Kingdom Antarctic Place-Names Committee (UK-APC) for Henry Purcell (1659–1695), English composer.
