= Finlandia Foothills =

Massif on Alexander Island, Antarctica

The Finlandia Foothills (69°56′S 70°9′W) are a rock massif, 10 nautical miles (19 km) long and 3 nautical miles (6 km) wide, rising to about 1,130 metres (3,700 ft) at the west side of Sibelius Glacier, situated in northern Alexander Island, Antarctica. The massif lies immediately south of the Geode Nunataks, north of the Handel Ice Piedmont and west of Witches Cauldron. They were photographed from the air by the Ronne Antarctic Research Expedition, 1947–48, and mapped from these photographs by D. Searle of the Falkland Islands Dependencies Survey, 1960. In association with the glacier they were named after the symphonic poem Finlandia by the Finnish composer Jean Sibelius (1865-1957).
