= Varlamov Glacier =

Glacier on Alexander Island, Antarctica

Varlamov Glacier (Russian: Lednik Varlamova;71°40′00″S 73°25′00″W) is a glacier on Beethoven Peninsula, Alexander Island, flowing northwest into the head of Brahms Inlet. It was named by the USSR Academy of Sciences in 1987 after Alexander Egorovich Varlamov (1801–48), the Russian composer.
