= Paulus Glacier =

Glacier in Antarctica

Paulus Glacier (69°24′S 70°33′W) is a glacier west of Mount Cupola, flowing southeast from Rouen Mountains into Hampton Glacier, north Alexander Island, Antarctica. Photographed from the air by Ronne Antarctic Research Expedition (RARE), 1947–48, and mapped from the air photographs by D. Searle of Falkland Islands Dependencies Survey (FIDS), 1960. Named by Advisory Committee on Antarctic Names (US-ACAN) after Lieutenant Commander John F. Paulus, U.S. Navy, LC-130 aircraft commander, Squadron VXE-6, U.S. Navy Operation Deepfreeze, 1969 and 1970.

== See also ==
- Alyabiev Glacier
- Hushen Glacier
- Wubbold Glacier
