= Mount Edgell =

Mountain in Graham Land, Antarctica

- Location within Antarctica

Highest point
- Elevation: 1,675 m (5,495 ft)
- Prominence: 1,088 m (3,570 ft)
- Listing: Ribu
- Coordinates: 69°26′S 68°16′W

Geography
- Location: Cape Jeremy, Antarctica

Mount Edgell is a mountain, 1,675 metres (5,500 ft) high, rising eastward of Cape Jeremy, the east side of the north entrance to George VI Sound, on the west coast of the Antarctic Peninsula. It was discovered by the French Antarctic Expedition of 1908–10 under Jean-Baptiste Charcot. Charcot saw it first from a great distance and thinking it to be an island, he named it "Ile Gordon Bennett" for James Gordon Bennett, Jr. of the New York Herald, who gave financial aid to the expedition. The British Graham Land Expedition under John Rymill, surveying this area in 1936–37 and finding no island, applied the name Mount Edgell to the feature now recognized as Charcot's "Ile Gordon Bennett." The name Mount Edgell, after Sir John Augustine Edgell, Hydrographer of the Navy from 1932–45, has since become established through international usage.

== See also ==
- Pampero Pass
