= Eros Glacier =

Glacier in Antarctica

Eros Glacier (71°18′S 68°20′W) is a glacier on the east coast of Alexander Island, Antarctica, 7 nautical miles (13 km) long and 2 nautical miles (4 km) wide at its mouth, flowing southeast from the Planet Heights into George VI Sound immediately north of Fossil Bluff. It was probably first seen on November 23, 1935, by Lincoln Ellsworth, who flew directly over the glacier and obtained photos of features north and south of it. The mouth of the glacier was observed and positioned by the British Graham Land Expedition in 1936 and the Falkland Islands Dependencies Survey (FIDS) in 1948 and 1949. The glacier was mapped in detail from air photos taken by the Ronne Antarctic Research Expedition, 1947–48, by D. Searle of the FIDS in 1960. It was named by the UK Antarctic Place-Names Committee after the minor planet Eros in association with nearby Pluto Glacier and Uranus Glacier.

== See also ==
- Gilbert Glacier
- Jupiter Glacier
- Reuning Glacier
