= Tufts Pass =

Mountain pass in Alexander Island, Antarctica

Tufts Pass (69°25′S 70°35′W) is a pass extending in an east–west direction between the Rouen Mountains and the Elgar Uplands in the north part of Alexander Island, Antarctica. The mountain pass was probably first sighted from the air and roughly mapped by the British Graham Land Expedition in 1937. Remapped from air photos taken by the Ronne Antarctic Research Expedition in 1947–48, by Searle of the Falkland Islands Dependencies Survey in 1960. Named by the RARE for Tufts University, Medford, Massachusetts, United States, where Dr. Robert Nichols was head of the geology department before joining the RARE.

== See also ==
- Haffner Pass
- Quinault Pass
- Whistle Pass
