= Barkov Glacier =

Glacier in Antarctica

- Location of Queen Maud Land in Antarctica

- Location within Antarctica
- Location: Queen Maud Land
- Coordinates: 71°46′S 10°27′E
- Thickness: unknown
- Terminus: Orvin Mountains
- Status: unknown

Barkov Glacier (71°46′S 10°27′E) is a glacier draining northeast between Mount Dallmann and the central part of the Shcherbakov Range, in the Orvin Mountains, Queen Maud Land. First photographed and roughly plotted by the Third German Antarctic Expedition, 1938–39, it was mapped from air photos and surveys by the Sixth Norwegian Antarctic Expedition, 1956–60, remapped by the Soviet Antarctic Expedition, 1960–61, and named after Soviet geographer A.S. Barkov.

== See also ==
- List of glaciers in the Antarctic
- Glaciology
