= Spooner Bay =

Bay in Antarctica

Coordinates: 67°36′S 46°15′E

Spooner Bay is a 6-mile-wide bay on the coast of Enderby Land, lying 12 miles east of Freeth Bay in Alasheyev Bight. Plotted from air photos taken by Australian National Antarctic Research Expeditions (ANARE) in 1956. First visited by the Australian National Antarctic Research Expeditions (ANARE) (Thala Dan) under D.F. Styles in February 1961 and named for Sen. Bill Spooner, then Australian Minister of National Development.

== See also ==
- Fluted Rock
