= Pearson Spur =

Pearson Spur (69°43′S 70°25′W) is a spur extending southeast from Elgar Uplands toward the head of Sibelius Glacier, situated in the northern portion of Alexander Island, Antarctica. Photographed from the air by Ronne Antarctic Research Expedition (RARE) in 1947, roughly mapped from air photographs by Falkland Islands Dependencies Survey (FIDS) in 1959, and surveyed by British Antarctic Survey (BAS), 1973–77. Named by United Kingdom Antarctic Place-Names Committee (UK-APC) in 1980 after Martin Robert Pearson, BAS glaciologist, 1970–73, who worked on Alexander Island, in years 1971 and 1972.
