= Clarsach Glacier =

Glacier in Antarctica

Clarsach Glacier (69°57′S 70°17′W) is a glacier flowing south between Prague Spur and the Finlandia Foothills in northern Alexander Island, Antarctica. The feature was photographed from the air by the Ronne Antarctic Research Expedition, 1947–48, and was mapped from these photographs by D. Searle of the Falkland Islands Dependencies Survey, 1960. Further delineation was made from U.S. Navy aerial photographs taken 1966–67 and from U.S. Landsat imagery taken January 1974. It was so named by the UK Antarctic Place-Names Committee, 1977, due to the resemblance its profile shares with a clàrsach, or Irish harp.
