= Boccherini Inlet =

Ice-filled inlet in Alexander Island

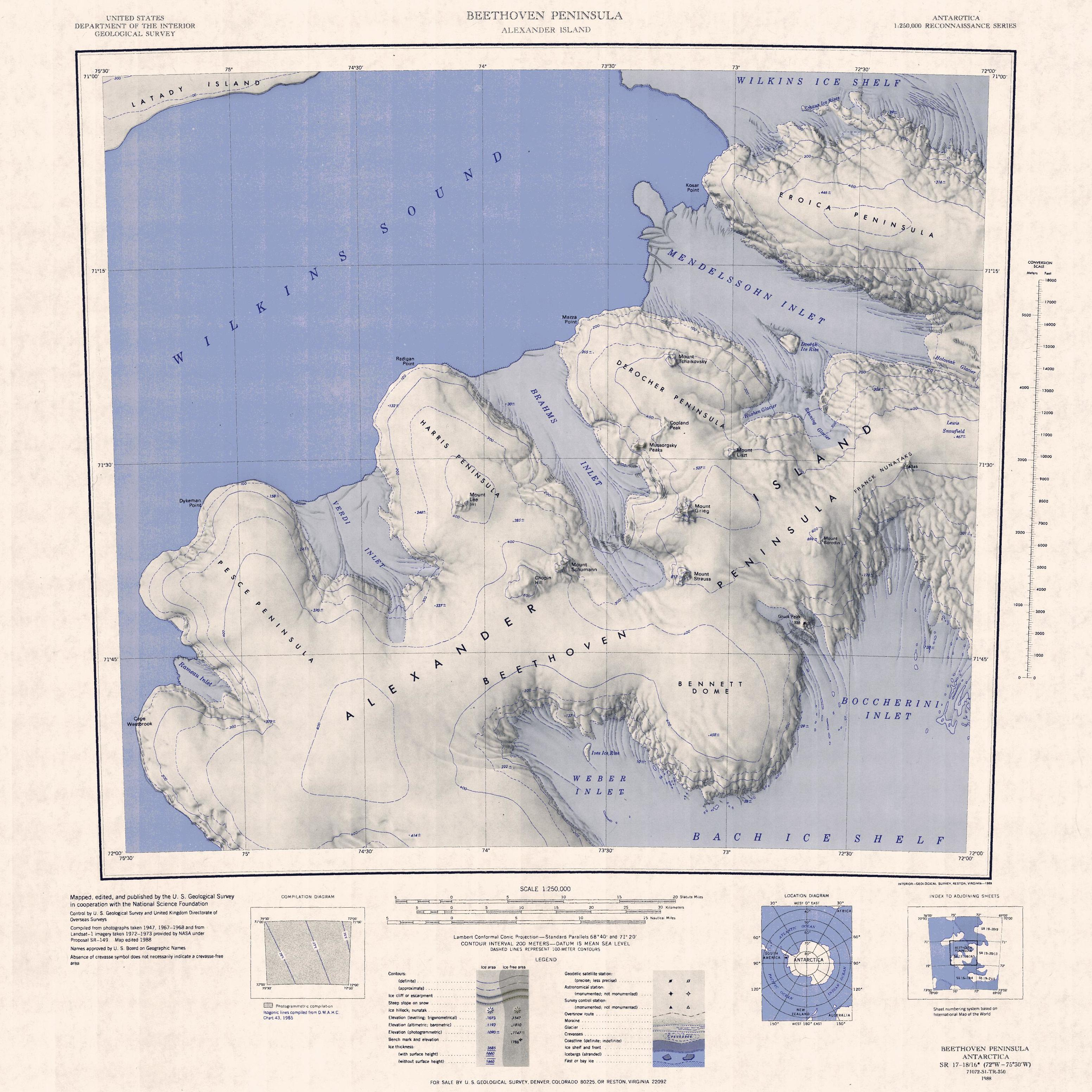
Boccherini Inlet

Boccherini Inlet (71°50′S 72°20′W) is an ice-filled inlet, 18 nautical miles (33 km) long and 16 nautical miles (30 km) wide, lying between Bennett Dome (to the west) and Shostakovich Peninsula (lying southeast of Boccherini Inlet), which indents the south side of Beethoven Peninsula and forms the northern extremity of the Bach Ice Shelf in Alexander Island. It was first mapped from air photos taken by the Ronne Antarctic Research Expedition, 1947–48, by Derek J.H. Searle of the Falkland Islands Dependencies Survey in 1960, and named by the UK Antarctic Place-Names Committee for Luigi Boccherini, the Italian composer.
