= Bartók Glacier =

Glacier in Antarctica

- Location within Antarctic Peninsula Location within Antarctica
- Location: Alexander Island
- Coordinates: 69°38′S 71°0′W
- Length: 7 nmi (13 km; 8 mi)
- Width: 3 nmi (6 km; 3 mi)
- Thickness: unknown
- Terminus: northern part of Alexander Island
- Status: unknown

Bartók Glacier (69°38′S 71°0′W) is a glacier, 7 nautical miles (13 km) long and 3 nautical miles (6 km) wide, flowing southwest from the southern end of the Elgar Uplands in the northern part of Alexander Island. It was first photographed from the air and roughly mapped by the British Graham Land Expedition in 1937, and more accurately mapped from air photos taken by the Ronne Antarctic Research Expedition, 1947–48, by D. Searle of the Falkland Islands Dependencies Survey in 1960. It was named by the UK Antarctic Place-Names Committee after the Hungarian composer Béla Bartók.

== See also ==
- List of glaciers in the Antarctic
- Delius Glacier
- Rosselin Glacier
- Hushen Glacier
- Glaciology
