= Coulter Glacier =

Glacier in Antarctica

Location of Alexander Island in the Antarctic Peninsula region

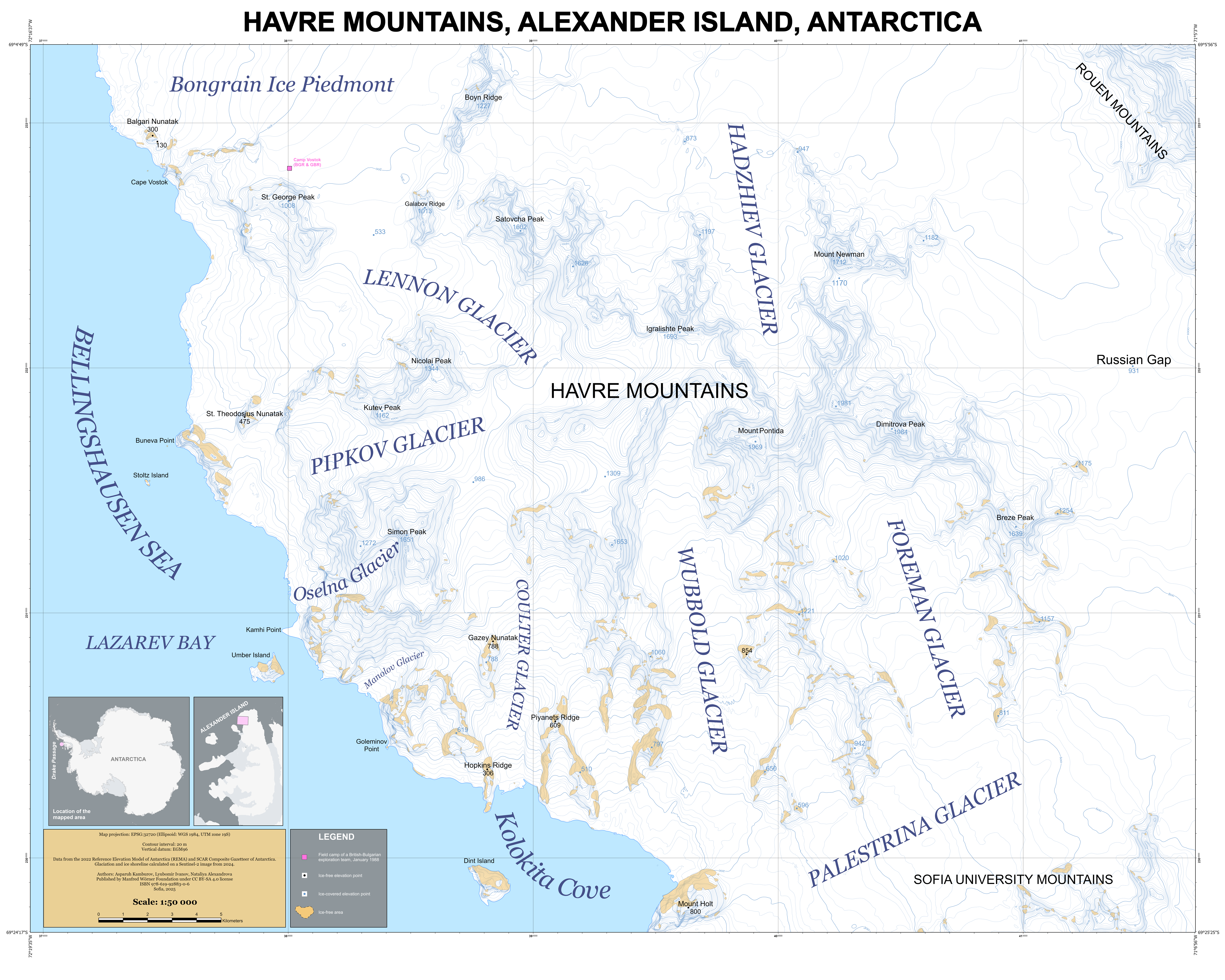
Map of Havre Mountains, Alexander Island in Antarctica

Coulter Glacier (69°20′S 71°47′W) is a steeply inclined glacier, 5 nautical miles (9 km) long, flowing south from the Havre Mountains, northern Alexander Island, into Kolokita Cove in Lazarev Bay, Antarctica. The glacier was photographed from the air by the Ronne Antarctic Research Expedition in 1947 and mapped from the photographs by the Falkland Islands Dependencies Survey in 1960. It was named by the Advisory Committee on Antarctic Names for R.W. Coulter, Master of USNS Alatna during U.S. Navy Operation Deepfreeze, 1969.

== See also ==
- Yozola Glacier
- Sullivan Glacier
