= Arensky Glacier =

Glacier in Antarctica

- Location within Antarctic Peninsula Location within Antarctica
- Location: Alexander Island
- Coordinates: 71°39′S 72°15′W
- Length: 3 nmi (6 km; 3 mi)
- Thickness: unknown
- Terminus: Boccherini Inlet
- Status: unknown

Arensky Glacier (71°39′S 72°15′W) is an Antarctic glacier, lying 3 miles (5 km) east of Alyabiev Glacier and flows south from Beethoven Peninsula, Alexander Island, into the north end of Boccherini Inlet. The glacier was named by the USSR Academy of Sciences in 1987, after Anton Arensky, the Russian composer.
