= McManus Glacier =

Glacier in Antarctica

Location of Alexander Island in the Antarctic Peninsula region.

McManus Glacier (69°28′S 71°27′W) is a glacier flowing north into Palestrina Glacier, in northwestern Alexander Island, Antarctica. It separates Lassus Mountains on the west from Sofia University Mountains on the east. The glacier was surveyed by the British Antarctic Survey (BAS), 1975–76, and was named by the UK Antarctic Place-Names Committee in 1980 after Alan James McManus, a BAS cook at Grytviken and Faraday Research Station, 1971–73, and at Adelaide Island and Rothera Research Station, 1975–78.
