= Asafiev Glacier =

Glacier in Antarctica

- Location within Antarctic Peninsula Location within Antarctica
- Location: Alexander Island
- Coordinates: 71°05′S 70°45′W
- Thickness: unknown
- Terminus: Schubert Inlet
- Status: unknown

Asafiev Glacier (71°05′S 70°45′W) is a glacier that flows north-west into Schubert Inlet from the western side of the Walton Mountains, Alexander Island, Antarctica. It was named by the USSR Academy of Sciences in 1987 after Boris Asafiev, the Russian composer.

== See also ==
- Alyabiev Glacier
- Arensky Glacier
