= Gilbert Glacier =

Glacier in Antarctica

- Location within Antarctica
- Location: Alexander Island
- Coordinates: 70°00′S 71°00′W
- Length: 20 nmi (37 km; 23 mi)
- Thickness: unknown
- Terminus: Mozart Ice Piedmont
- Status: unknown

Gilbert Glacier (70°0′S 71°0′W) is a glacier about 20 nautical miles (37 km) long flowing south from Nichols Snowfield into Mozart Ice Piedmont, situated in northern Alexander Island, Antarctica.

Photographed from the air by Ronne Antarctic Research Expedition (RARE), 1947–48, and mapped from these photographs by D. Searle of Falkland Islands Dependencies Survey (FIDS), 1960. Named in association with Sullivan Glacier, after W. S. Gilbert (1836–1911), the British librettist, by United Kingdom Antarctic Place-Names Committee (UK-APC), 1977.

== See also ==
- Grotto Glacier
- Lennon Glacier
- Yozola Glacier
