= Grotto Glacier =

Glacier in Antarctica

Coordinates: 70°45′S 68°35′W

Grotto Glacier is a glacier on the east coast of Alexander Island, Antarctica, which flows east into George VI Sound between Belemnite Point and Ablation Point. It is 46 km (29 mi) long, 6 km (4 mi) wide where it emerges from the coastal mountains, and 13 km (8.1 mi) wide at its mouth. It was first photographed from the air on 23 November 1935, by Lincoln Ellsworth and mapped from these photographs by W.L.G. Joerg. It was roughly surveyed in 1936 by the British Graham Land Expedition and resurveyed in 1949 by the Falkland Islands Dependencies Survey (FIDS). The glacier was so named by the FIDS because a sledge dog was rescued from a grotto-like crevasse in the glacier.

== See also ==
- Holoviak Glacier
- Iliev Glacier
