= Delius Glacier =

Glacier in Antarctica

Delius Glacier (69°37′S 71°3′W) is a glacier, 6 nautical miles (11 km) long and 2 nautical miles (4 km) wide, flowing west from the Elgar Uplands into Nichols Snowfield, in the northern part of Alexander Island, Antarctica. It was first seen from the air and roughly mapped by the British Graham Land Expedition in 1937. It was more accurately mapped from air photos taken by the Ronne Antarctic Research Expedition, 1947–48, by D. Searle of the Falkland Islands Dependencies Survey in 1960, and from U.S. Landsat imagery of February 1975. It was named by the UK Antarctic Place-Names Committee after Frederick Delius, the British composer.

== See also ==
- List of glaciers in the Antarctic
- Balakirev Glacier
- Gerontius Glacier
- Narechen Glacier
