= Yozola Glacier =

Glacier in Antarctica

Location of Alexander Island in the Antarctic Peninsula region.

Yozola Glacier (Bulgarian: ледник Йозола, romanized: lednik Yozola, IPA: [ˈlɛdnik ˈjɔzoɫa]) is the 5 km long and 1.7 km wide glacier in the Sofia University Mountains situated in the northern portion of Alexander Island in Antarctica, and draining north-northwestwards between Mount Braun and Balan Ridge to flow into Palestrina Glacier.

The glacier is named after Yozola Lake in the Rila Mountain, Bulgaria.

== Location ==
Yozola Glacier is located at 69°26′30″S 71°23′50″W. British mapping in 1963.

== Maps ==
- British Antarctic Territory. Scale 1:200000 topographic map No. 3127. DOS 610 - W 69 70. Tolworth, UK, 1971.
- Antarctic Digital Database (ADD). Scale 1:250000 topographic map of Antarctica. Scientific Committee on Antarctic Research (SCAR), 1993–2016.
