= Hushen Glacier =

Glacier in Antarctica

Hushen Glacier (71°26′S 72°52′W) is a glacier lying at the southwestern part of the base of the Mendelssohn Inlet, an inlet lying between Derocher Peninsula and Eroica Peninsula indenting the north face of Beethoven Peninsula, in the southwestern portion of Alexander Island, Antarctica. The glacier flows northeast while joining Reuning Glacier which discharges into the south part of Mendelssohn Inlet. It was mapped by the United States Geological Survey from U.S. Navy aerial photographs taken 1967–68 and from Landsat imagery taken 1972–73, and was named by the Advisory Committee on Antarctic Names for W. Timothy Hushen, Director of the Polar Research Board at the National Academy of Sciences, 1981–88.

== See also ==
- Alyabiev Glacier
- Asafiev Glacier
- Palestrina Glacier
