= Sullivan Glacier =

Glacier in Antarctica

Sullivan Glacier (69°42′S 70°45′W) is a glacier flowing west into Gilbert Glacier, immediately south of Elgar Uplands in the north part of Alexander Island, Antarctica. The glacier was first sighted from a distance by the British Graham Land Expedition during a flight in 1937 and roughly mapped. Remapped from air photos taken by the Ronne Antarctic Research Expedition in 1947–48, by Searle of the Falkland Islands Dependencies Survey in 1960. In association with the names of other composers in this area, named by United Kingdom Antarctic Place-Names Committee after Sir Arthur Sullivan (1842–1900), English composer.

== See also ==
- Clarsach Glacier
- McManus Glacier
- Trench Glacier
