= Balakirev Glacier =

Glacier in Antarctica

- Location within Antarctic Peninsula Location within Antarctica
- Location: Alexander Island
- Coordinates: 71°25′S 70°01′W
- Thickness: unknown
- Terminus: Schubert Inlet
- Status: unknown

Balakirev Glacier (71°25′S 70°01′W) is an Antarctic glacier flowing northeast into Schubert Inlet from the south part of the Walton Mountains, Alexander Island. It was named by the USSR Academy of Sciences, in 1987, after Mily Balakirev, the Russian composer.

== See also ==
- Alyabiev Glacier
- Asafiev Glacier
- Wubbold Glacier
