= Alyabiev Glacier =

Glacier in Antarctica

- Location within Antarctic Peninsula Location within Antarctica
- Location: Alexander Island
- Coordinates: 71°42′S 72°40′W
- Terminus: Boccherini Inlet

Alyabiev Glacier (71°42′S 72°40′W) is a glacier in Antarctica, flowing south from Gluck Peak into Boccherini Inlet and lies about 3 miles (5 km) West of Arensky Glacier on Beethoven Peninsula, Alexander Island, It was named by the USSR Academy of Sciences, in 1987, after Alexander Alyabiev (1787-1851), the Russian composer.
