= Mozart Ice Piedmont =

Mozart Ice Piedmont (70°0′S 71°0′W) is an ice piedmont, 60 nautical miles (110 km) long-running in a NW-SE direction and 15 nautical miles (28 km) wide in its widest part, on the west coast of Alexander Island, Antarctica. Mapped from air photos taken by the Ronne Antarctic Research Expedition (RARE) in 1947, by Searle of the Falkland Islands Dependencies Survey (FIDS) in 1960. Named by the United Kingdom Antarctic Place-Names Committee (UK-APC) for Wolfgang Amadeus Mozart (1756–1791), famous Austrian composer. Some landforms within this area are named in association with the Mozart Ice Piedmont such as Figaro Nunatak, along with a few other landforms.

== See also ==
- Bongrain Ice Piedmont
- Handel Ice Piedmont
