= Lennon Glacier =

Glacier in Antarctica

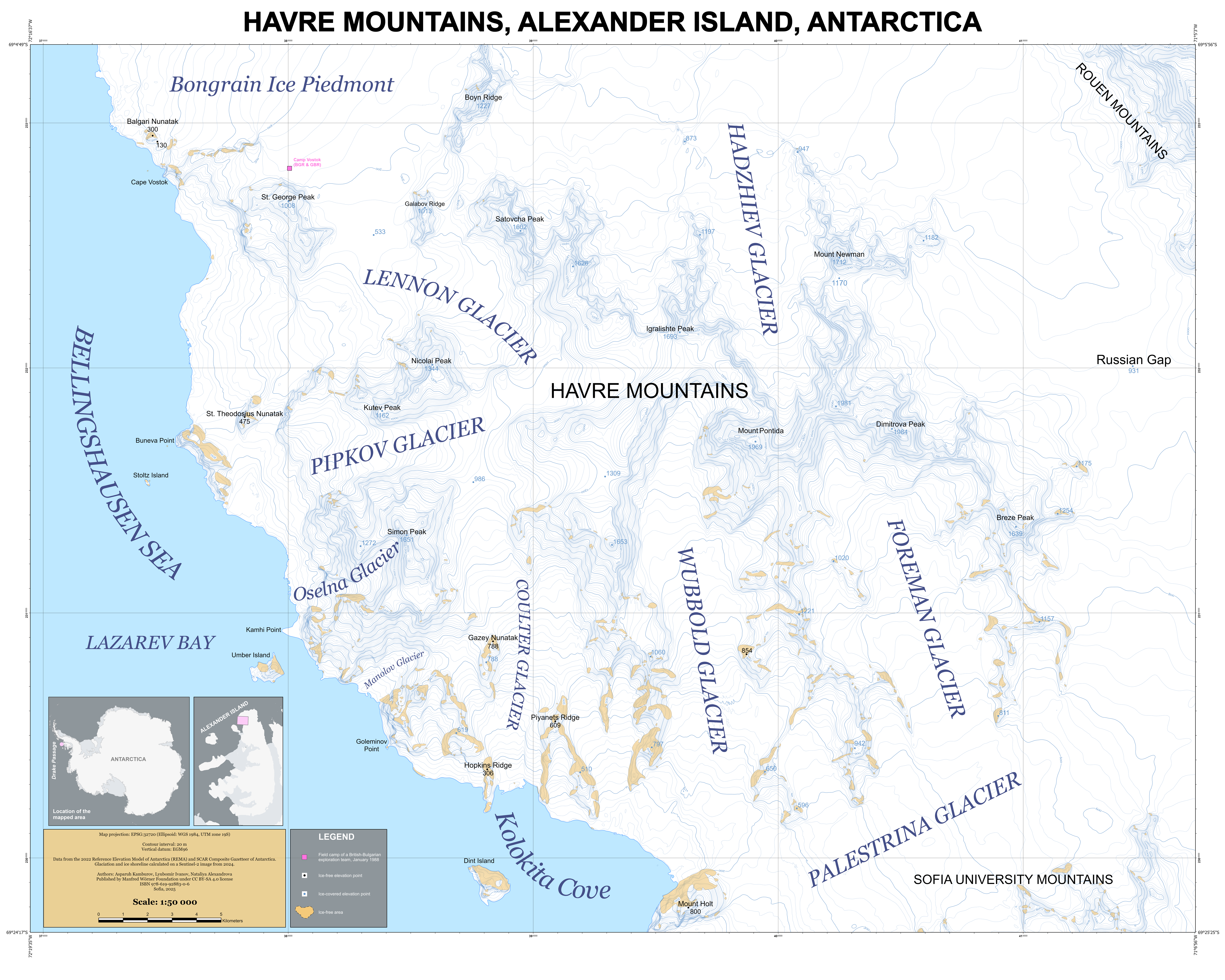
Map of Havre Mountains, Alexander Island in Antarctica

Lennon Glacier (69°12′S 71°59′W) is a glacier flowing southwest into the outer part of Lazarev Bay, in northern Alexander Island, Antarctica. It was surveyed by the British Antarctic Survey (BAS), 1975–76, and was named by the UK Antarctic Place-Names Committee in 1980 after BAS glaciologist Peter Wilfred Lennon, who worked on Alexander Island, 1974–76.

== See also ==
- Hampton Glacier
- Palestrina Glacier
- Sullivan Glacier
