= Palestrina Glacier =

Glacier in Antarctica

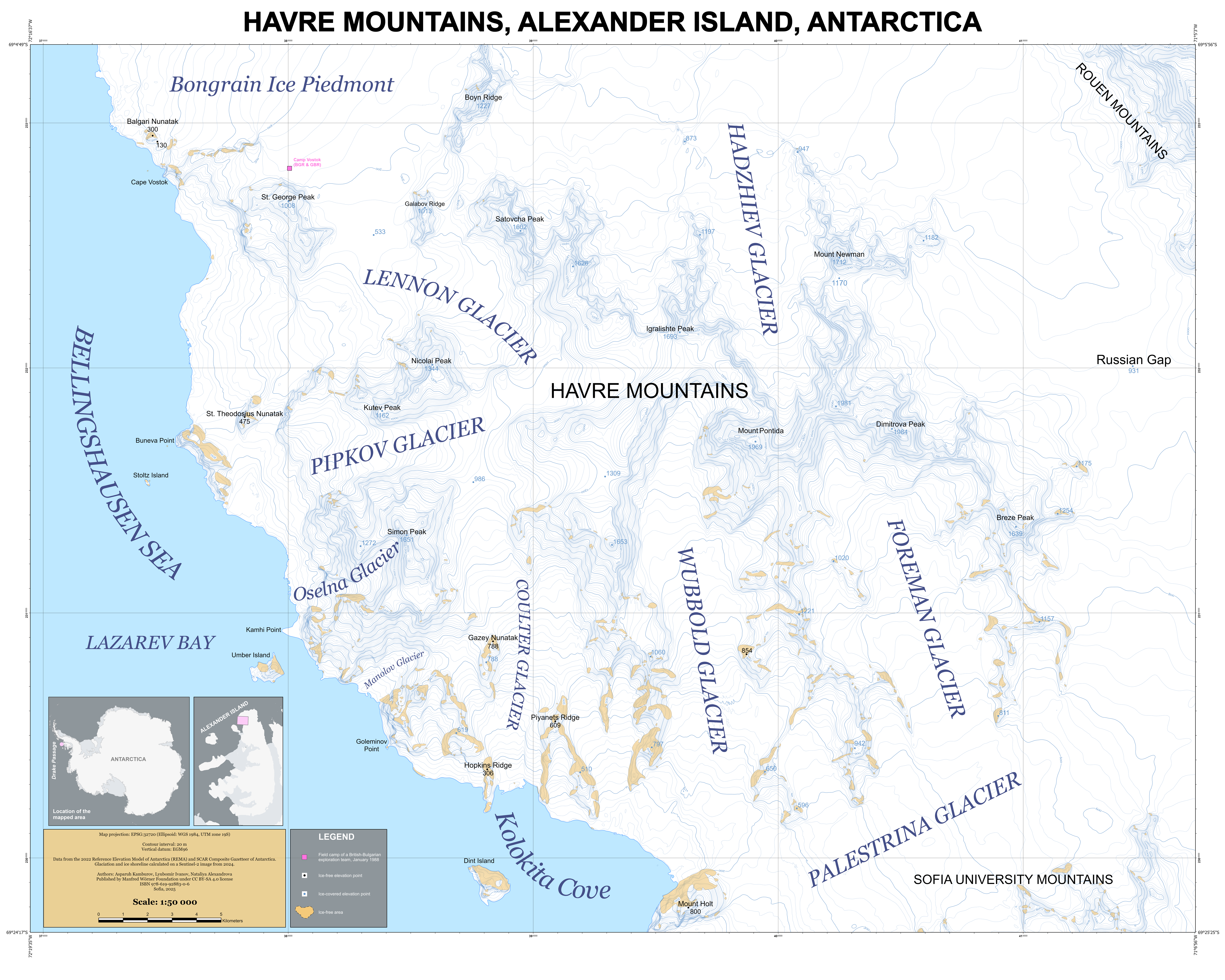
Map of Havre Mountains, Alexander Island in Antarctica

Palestrina Glacier (69°21′S 71°35′W) is a glacier lying in the northern portion of Alexander Island, Antarctica, 11 nautical miles (20 km) long and 8 nautical miles (15 km) wide, flowing west from Nichols Snowfield into Lazarev Bay. The glacier was mapped from air photos taken by the Ronne Antarctic Research Expedition (RARE), 1947–48, by Derek J.H. Searle of the Falkland Islands Dependencies Survey (FIDS) in 1960. Named by the United Kingdom Antarctic Place-Names Committee (UK-APC) for Giovanni da Palestrina (1525–1594), Italian composer.

== See also ==
- Balakirev Glacier
- Lennon Glacier
