= Eternity Range =

Mountain range in Palmer Land, Antarctica

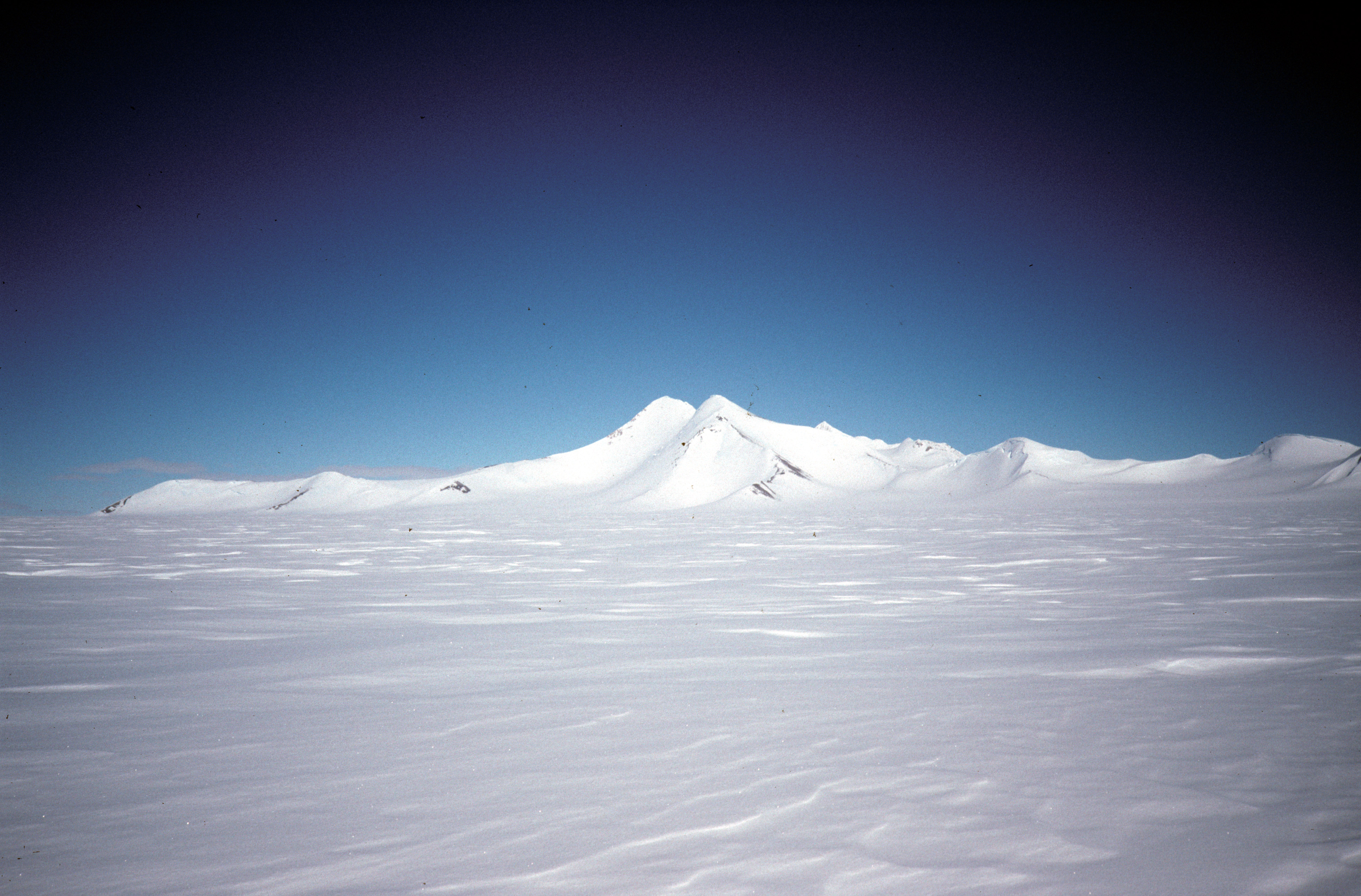
- Mount Charity, view from east

Highest point
- Peak: Mount Hope
- Elevation: 3,239 m (10,627 ft)

Dimensions
- Length: 28 mi (45 km)

Geography
- Location within Antarctica
- Continent: Antarctica
- Region: Palmer Land
- Range coordinates: 69°46′S 64°34′W
- Parent range: Antarctandes

The Eternity Range (69°46′S 64°34′W) is a range of mountains 28 nautical miles (52 km; 32 mi) long, rising to 3,239 metres (10,627 ft) (Note: Albert (1995) gives the elevation of the highest point as 2,860 metres (9,380 ft). In December 2017 the British Antarctic Survey (BAS) announced that satellite data had shown that Mount Hope was 3,239 metres (10,627 ft) high, the highest in the British Antarctic Territory, moving Mount Jackson at 3,184 metres (10,446 ft) down to second place. Mount Vinson is still the highest mountain in Antarctica, at 4,892 metres (16,050 ft).), and trending north–south approximately in the middle of the Antarctic Peninsula. The range is divided into three main mountain blocks, the major summits in each from north to south being Mounts Faith, Hope and Charity.

== Location ==
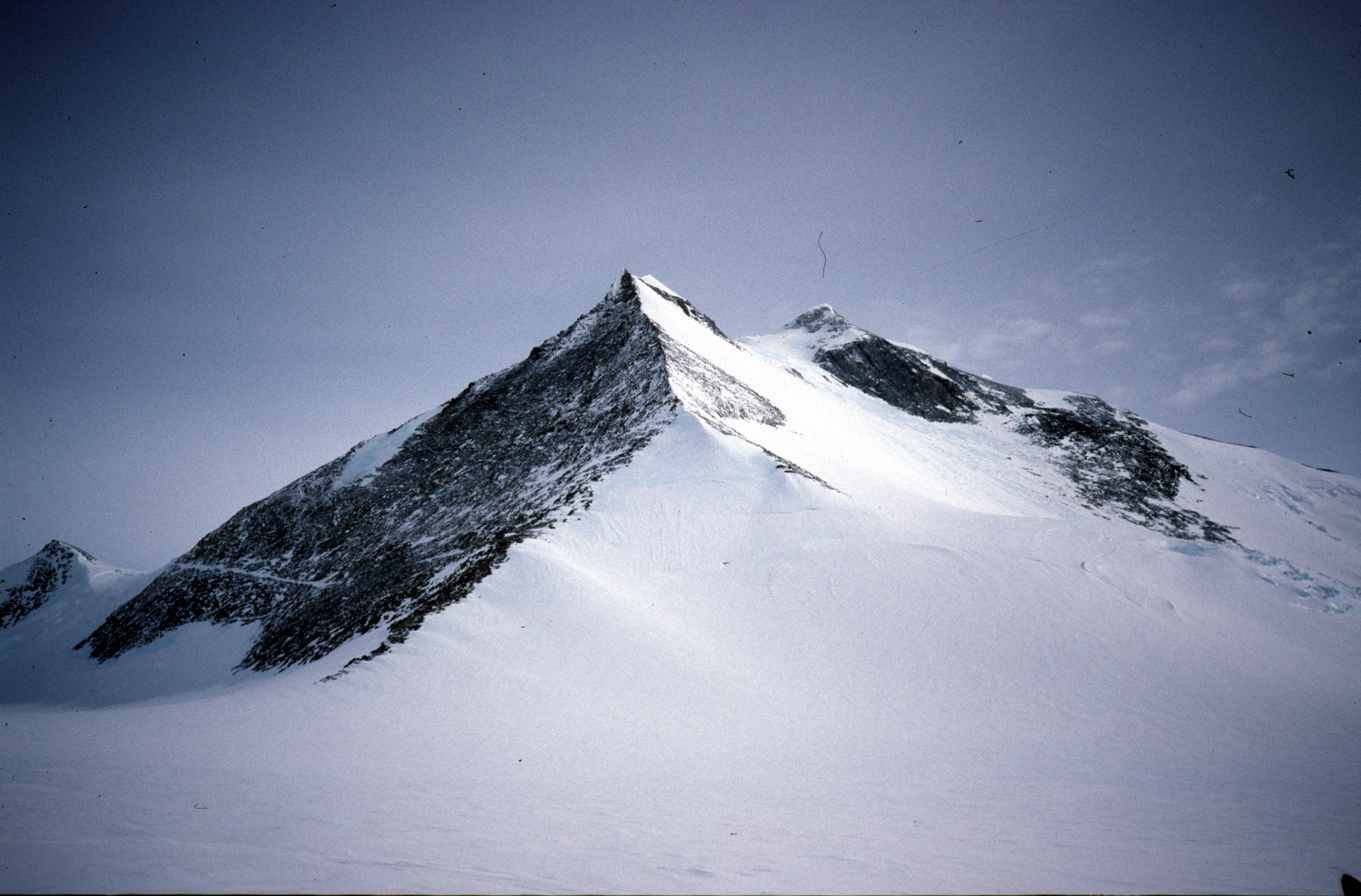
Mount Hope south face - oblique view from east in March 2004

The Eternity Range is in northern Palmer Land, between the Weddell Sea to the east and Marguerite Bay to the west. It is to the east of the Dyer Plateau, southeast of the Bristly Peaks, south of the head of Lurabee Glacier, west of Stefansson Sound and north of the Columbia Mountains. Features, from north to south, are Mount Faith, Mount Hope and Mount Charity. Nearby features include Brand Peak, Mount Duemler and Mount Sullivan to the east, and Wakefield Highland and Davies Top to the north.

== Discovery and name ==
Lincoln Ellsworth discovered the range from the air during his flights of November 21 and November 23, 1935. He applied the names Eternity Range and Mounts Faith, Hope and Charity. In November 1936, the range was surveyed by John Riddoch Rymill of the British Graham Land Expedition (BGLE) who gave the name "Mount Wakefield" to the central mountain in the range. This complication by Rymill, and uncertainty as to the precise location or extent of Ellsworth's discovery, hindered for a time a resolution of its nomenclature. Thus, following the United States Antarctic Service (USAS) expedition in 1939–41, the name Eternity Range or Eternity Mountains was incorrectly applied to the present Welch Mountains 60 nautical miles (110 km; 69 mi) farther south.

A careful study of the original reports, maps and photographs, and comparison with materials from subsequent expeditions such as the Ronne Antarctic Research Expedition (RARE), 1947, and the Falkland Islands Dependencies Survey (FIDS), 1960, has led to the conclusion that the range described comprises at least the core of Ellsworth's Eternity Range and appropriately commemorates his discovery. The name "Wakefield", given by Rymill, has been transferred to nearby Wakefield Highland.

== Features ==
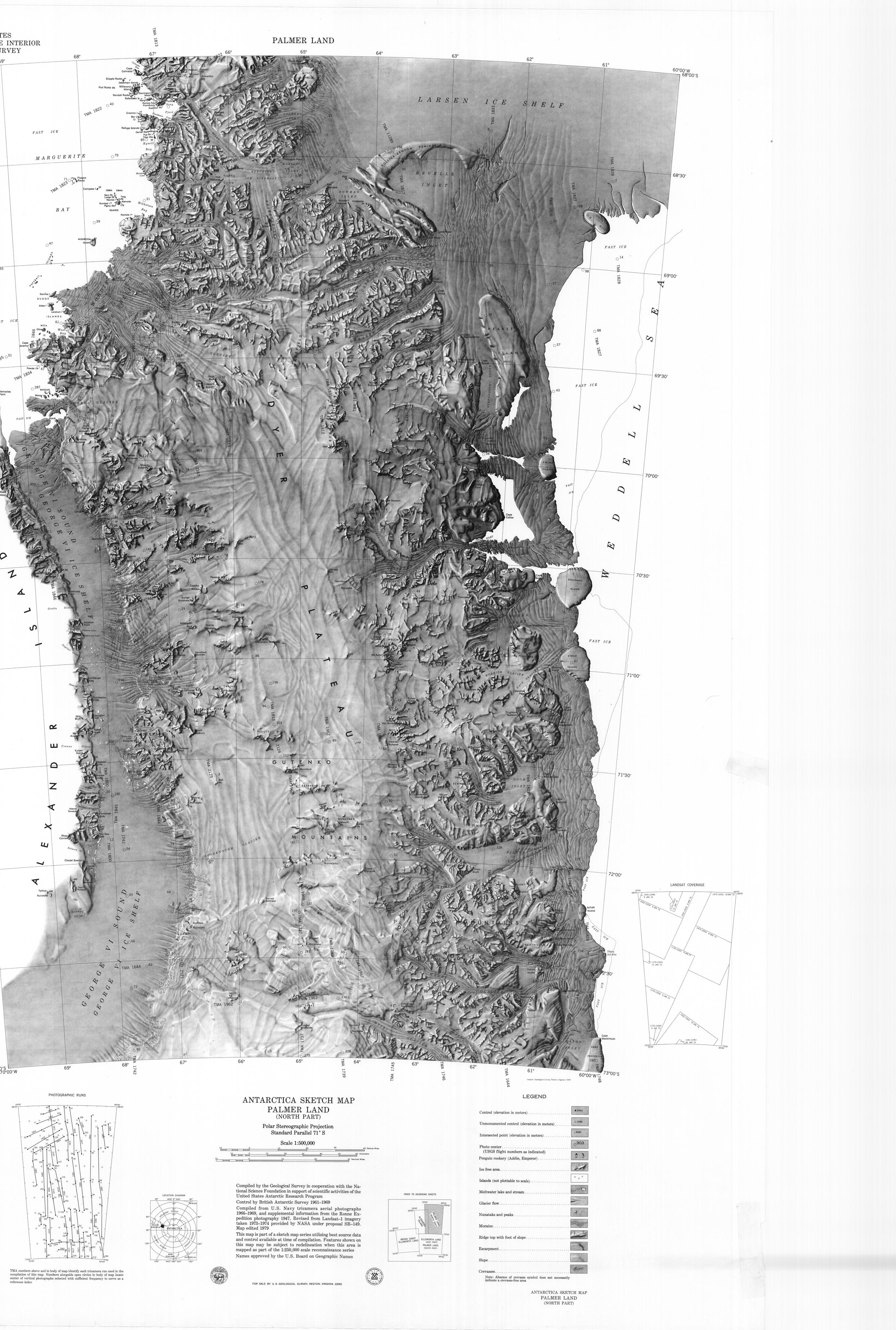
Northern Palmer Land. Eternity Range upper center of map

=== Mount Faith ===
69°37′S 64°29′W. A massive mountain 9 nautical miles (17 km; 10 mi) north of Mount Hope, rising to 2,650 metres (8,690 ft) high from the north end of Eternity Range. First seen from the air and named by Lincoln Ellsworth during his flights of November 21 and 23, 1935. Surveyed by J.R. Rymill of BGLE in November 1936. The mountain was subsequently photographed from the air by the US AS in September 1940, and RARE in December 1947.

=== Mount Hope ===
69°46′S 64°34′W. A massive mountain rising to 3,239 metres (10,627 ft) high, forming the central and highest peak of Eternity Range. First seen from the air and named Mount Hope by Lincoln Ellsworth during his flights of November 21 and 23, 1935. The mountain was surveyed and given the name Mount Wakefield by J.R. Rymill of BGLE in November 1936. The feature was subsequently photographed from the air by the USAS in September 1940, and by RARE in December 1947. A careful study of the reports, maps, and photographs of these expeditions, as well as additional survey of the area by FIDS in 1960, has led to the conclusion that Ellsworth's Mount Hope and Rymill's Mount Wakefield are synonymous. For the sake of historical continuity the name Mount Hope has been retained for this mountain, and the name Wakefield has been transferred to Wakefield Highland located close northwestward.

=== Mount Charity ===
69°54′S 64°34′W. A massive mountain 9 nautical miles (17 km; 10 mi) south of Mount Hope, rising 2,680 metres (8,790 ft) high from the south end of Eternity Range. First seen from the air and named by Lincoln Ellsworth during his flights of November 21 and 23, 1935. Surveyed by J.R. Rymill of BGLE in November 1936. The mountain was subsequently photographed from the air by the US AS in September 1940, and by RARE in December 1947. The feature is one of three major mountains in Ellsworth's Eternity Range to which he gave the names Faith, Hope and Charity.

== Nearby features ==
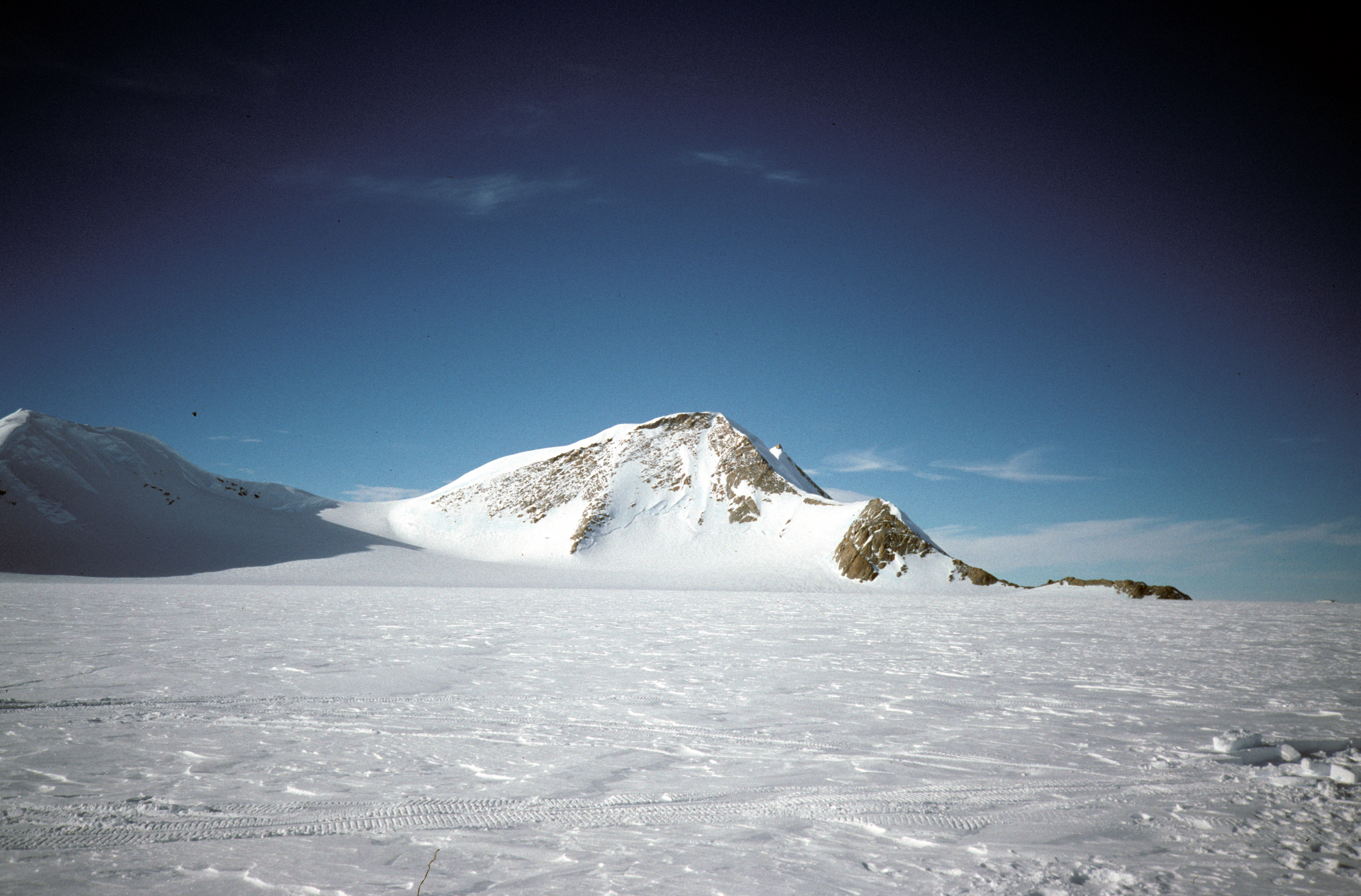
Brand Peak

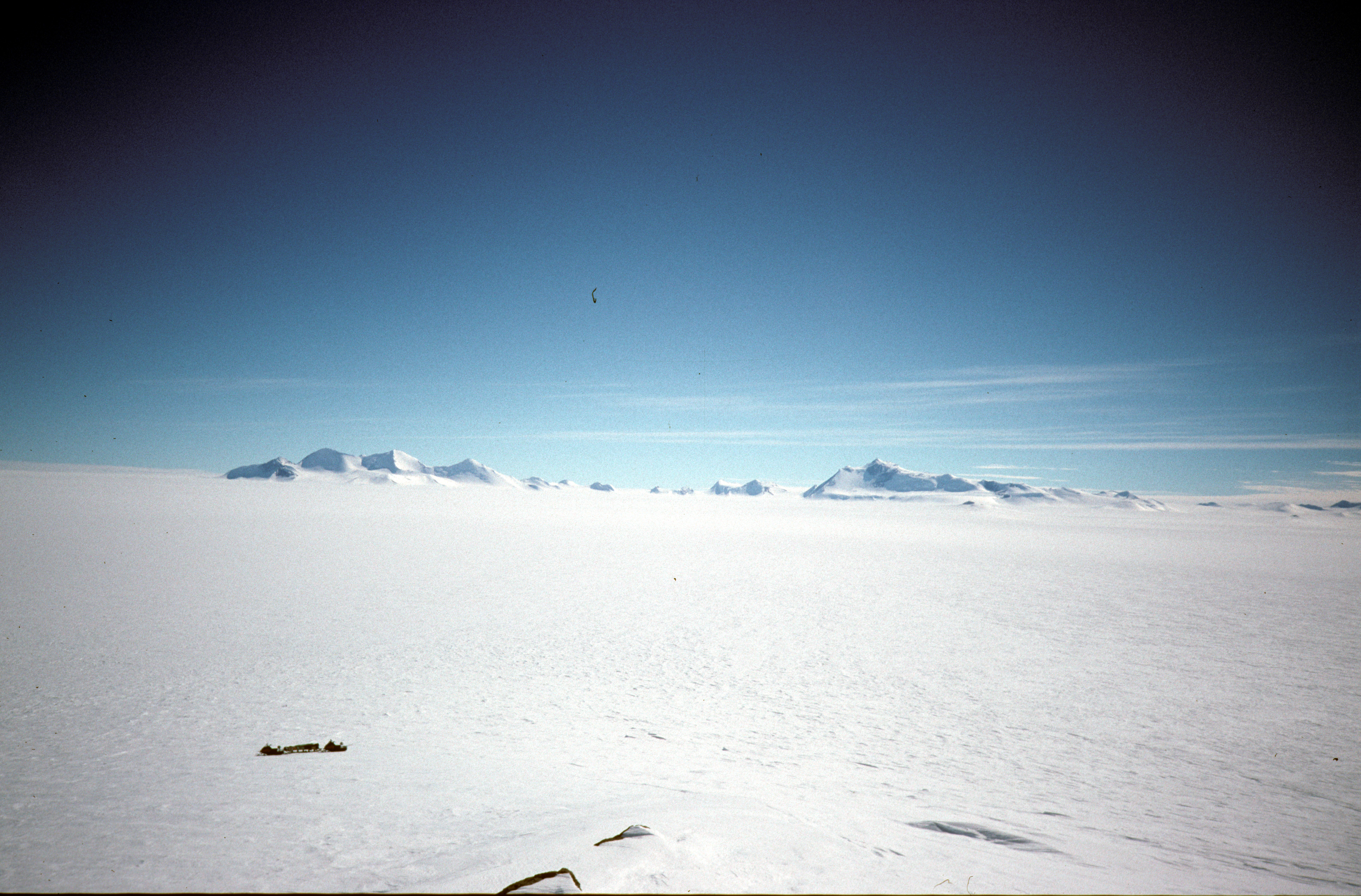
Southern Mount Duemler, view towards south

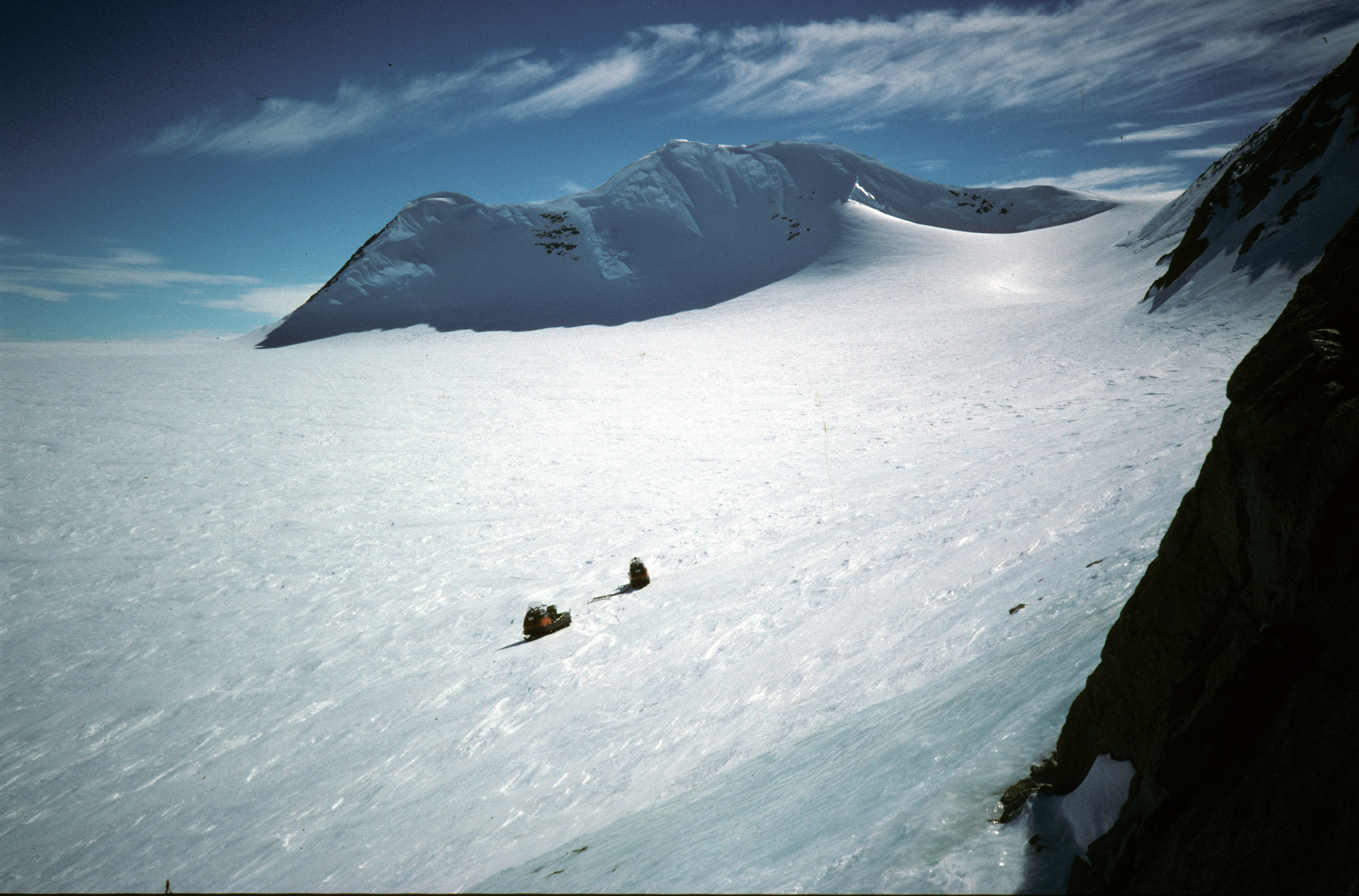
Eastern ridge of Mount Sullivan

=== Brand Peak ===
70°01′S 63°55′W. A sharp snow-covered peak located 10 nautical miles (19 km; 12 mi) east-southeast of the Eternity Range and 4 nautical miles (7.4 km; 4.6 mi) northwest of Mount Duemler. Mapped by the United States Geological Survey (USGS) in 1974. Named by the United States Advisory Committee on Antarctic Names (US-ACAN) for Timothy Brand, USARP biologist at Palmer Station in 1974.

=== Mount Duemler ===
70°01′S 63°45′W. Mountain, 2,225 metres (7,300 ft) high, rising southwest of the head of Anthony Glacier and 11 nautical miles (20 km; 13 mi) west of Mount Bailey, inland from the east coast of Palmer Land. This feature was first chartered by the BGLE under Rymill in 1936-37. It was photographed from the air by the USAS in 1940, and the RARE under Finn Ronne in 1947, and recharted in 1947 by a joint sledge party consisting of members of the RARE and FIDS. Named by Ronne for R.F. Duemler, vice president of the Delaware, Lackawanna and Western Coal Co., New York, which contributed coal to the expedition.

=== Mount Sullivan ===
69°39′S 63°49′W. A mountain, 2,070 metres (6,790 ft) high, standing 12 nautical miles (22 km; 14 mi) east of the north part of the Eternity Range. This feature lies in the area explored from the air by Sir Hubert Wilkins in 1928 and Lincoln Ellsworth in 1935, but it was first charted by the BGLE in 1936-37. It was photographed from the air in 1940 by the USAS and in 1947 by the RARE under Ronne. Named by Ronne for Colonel H.R. Sullivan of the Office of Research and Development of the then USAAF, which furnished equipment for the expedition.

=== Wakefield Highland ===
69°20′S 65°10′W. A snow-covered highland in central Antarctic Peninsula, bounded to the north by Hermes Glacier and the heads of Weyerhaeuser Glacier and Aphrodite Glacier, to the west by the heads of Airy Glacier, Rotz Glacier and Seller Glacier, to the south by Fleming Glacier and to the east by the heads of Lurabee Glacier, Sunfix Glacier and Grimley Glacier. Photographed from the air by RARE on December 22, 1947. Surveyed by FIDS in November 1960. Named after Viscount Wakefield of Hythe, a contributor to BGLE, 1934-37. This toponym, concurred in by the UK Antarctic Place-Names Committee (UK-APC) and the US-ACAN, restores the name Wakefield in the vicinity of the BGLE's displaced "Mount Wakefield" (now Mount Hope).

=== Davies Top ===
69°24′S 64°56′W. A conspicuous isolated peak 2,360 metres (7,740 ft) high on the east side of Wakefield Highland, near the head of Lurabee Glacier. Photographed from the air by RARE on December 22, 1947. Surveyed by FIDS in November 1960. Named by UK-APC after Anthony G. Davies of FIDS, Medical Officer at Horseshoe Island and Stonington Island, 1960.

== See also ==
- Antarctandes, the Antarctic Peninsula Cordillera

== Sources ==
- Alberts, Fred G., ed. (1995), Geographic Names of the Antarctic (PDF) (2 ed.), United States Board on Geographic Names This article incorporates public domain material from websites or documents of the United States Board on Geographic Names.
- New satellite imagery reveals new highest Antarctic Peninsula Mountain, BAS; British Antarctic Survey, 11 December 2017
- Palmer Land, USGS: United States Geological Survey

This article incorporates public domain material from websites or documents of the United States Geological Survey.
