= Mayer Hills =

The Mayer Hills (69°33′S 67°12′W) are low, mainly ice-covered hills with steep north-facing slopes but rather featureless summits, to about 900 metres (3,000 ft), lying south of Forster Ice Piedmont, on the Antarctic Peninsula, between Prospect Glacier and Mount Leo. They were first roughly surveyed from the ground by the British Graham Land Expedition, 1936–37. The hills were resurveyed by the Falkland Islands Dependencies Survey in 1958. They were named by the UK Antarctic Place-Names Committee after Johann Tobias Mayer (1723–1762), a German mathematician who constructed a series of lunar tables for determining longitude, published by the British Admiralty in 1775.
