= Rotz Glacier =

Glacier in Antarctica

Rotz Glacier (69°17′S 65°43′W) is a tributary glacier 9 nautical miles (17 km) long and 2 nautical miles (3.7 km) wide. It flows west from Wakefield Highland, central Antarctic Peninsula, into Airy Glacier at a point due south of Mount Timosthenes. Photographed by Ronne Antarctic Research Expedition (RARE) on November 27, 1947 (Trimetrogon air photography). Surveyed by Falkland Islands Dependencies Survey (FIDS) in December 1958 and November 1960. Named by United Kingdom Antarctic Place-Names Committee (UK-APC) after Jean Rotz, 16th century French chartmaker and writer on the principles of navigation, who designed an elaborate magnetic compass and became hydrographer to King Henry VIII in 1542.
