= Downs Nunatak =

Nunatak in Palmer Land, Antarctica

Downs Nunatak (69°36′S 66°40′W) is a nunatak rising to 1,000 metres (3,300 ft) between the Garcie Peaks and Webb Peak, Crescent Scarp, in northwest Palmer Land. The nunatak was photographed from the air by the United States Antarctic Service, 1940, the U.S. Navy, 1966, and was surveyed by the British Antarctic Survey, 1970–73. It was named by the Advisory Committee on Antarctic Names for Bobby G. Downs, a U.S. Navy cook at Palmer Station, winter party 1968.
