= Messent Peak =

Mountain in Antarctica

Messent Peak (69°24′S 66°13′W) is one of the Bristly Peaks, rising to about 1,100 metres (3,600 ft) just west of Brodie Peak and 5 nautical miles (9 km) southwest of Mount Castro in the central Antarctic Peninsula. It was named by the Advisory Committee on Antarctic Names in 1977 for David R. Messent, a geodesist at the U.S. Army Topographic Command (later the Defense Mapping Agency, Hydrographic/Topographic Center), Palmer Station, winter party 1969.
