= Anchor Crag =

- Location within Antarctica

Highest point
- Peak: 1003
- Coordinates: 69°12′S 66°12′W

Geography
- Location: Graham Land, Antarctic Peninsula
- Parent range: Mount Gilbert

Anchor Crag is a rocky crag on the north side of Airy Glacier, 4 nautical miles (7 km) north-northeast of Mount Gilbert, in the central part of the Antarctic Peninsula. It was photographed from the air by the Ronne Antarctic Research Expedition on November 27, 1947, and surveyed by the Falkland Islands Dependencies Survey, November 4, 1958. The United Kingdom Antarctic Place-Names Committee name is descriptive of a snow patch lodged on the face of the rock which, in 1958, closely resembled a ship's anchor.
