= Garcie Peaks =

Group of peaks in the Antarctic Peninsula

The Garcie Peaks (69°32′S 66°48′W) are a group of three small peaks, the highest at 960 metres (3,150 ft), located 5 nautical miles (9 km) southeast of Mount Leo on the south side of Fleming Glacier, in the west-central Antarctic Peninsula. They were surveyed from the ground by the Falkland Islands Dependencies Survey in December 1958, and were named by the UK Antarctic Place-Names Committee after Pierre Garcie, a French sailor whose Le grand routier et pilotage (1483) was the first manual of sailing directions to include coastal recognition sketches.
