= Khamsin Pass =

Khamsin Pass (69°29′S 67°45′W) is a pass at 750 metres (2,460 ft), running north–south between the Relay Hills and the Kinnear Mountains, southward of the Wordie Ice Shelf, Antarctic Peninsula. An important pass used by the British Graham Land Expedition, 1936–37, and subsequent parties, it allows easy access from the Wordie Ice Shelf into Palmer Land. It was named in 1977 by the UK Antarctic Place-Names Committee in association with other wind names in the area, khamsin being the warm southerly wind in Egypt that comes from the Sahara.

== See also ==
- Rendezvous Rocks
