= Norman Peak =

Mountain in Antarctica

Norman Peak (69°9′S 66°8′W) is a peak rising to 1,790 m on the north side of Airy Glacier, 4 nautical miles (7 km) north-northeast of Anchor Crag and 3.8 nautical miles (7 km) west of Peregrinus Peak, in southwest Graham Land. The peak was photographed from the air by Ronne Antarctic Research Expedition (RARE), 1947, and was surveyed by Falkland Islands Dependencies Survey (FIDS), 1958. Named by the United Kingdom Antarctic Place-Names Committee (UK-APC) after Robert Norman (fl. 1560-96), English compass maker who fortuitously discovered magnetic dip in 1576.
