= Flinders Peak =

Mountain in Antarctica

Flinders Peak (69°21′S 66°40′W) is a conspicuous triangular peak, 960 metres (3,150 ft) high, on the west end of the Bristly Peaks. The peak overlooks Forster Ice Piedmont near the west coast of the Antarctic Peninsula. It was photographed from the air by the British Graham Land Expedition (February 1937) and the Ronne Antarctic Research Expedition (December 1947). It was surveyed from the ground by the Falkland Islands Dependencies Survey in December 1958, and was named by the UK Antarctic Place-Names Committee after Matthew Flinders, an English navigator who discovered the cause of deviation in magnetic compasses, and pointed the way to a solution, 1805–14.
