= Relay Hills =

Hills in Antarctica

Relay Hills (69°29′S 68°0′W) is a group of low, ice-covered hills, mainly conical in shape, between Mount Edgell and Kinnear Mountains in western Antarctic Peninsula. First roughly surveyed from the ground by British Graham Land Expedition (BGLE), 1936–37. Photographed from the air by Ronne Antarctic Research Expedition (RARE), November 1947. Resurveyed by Falkland Islands Dependencies Survey (FIDS), November 1958. The name, applied by the United Kingdom Antarctic Place-Names Committee (UK-APC), arose because both the BGLE and the FIDS sledging parties had to relay their loads through this area to the head of Prospect Glacier.

== Named hills ==
The UK-APC was responsible for naming some of the peaks within the Relay Hills, typically after the names of various local winds.

- Helm Peak (69°29′S 67°50′W) rises to 930 metres (3,050 ft), making it the highest elevation in the Relay Hills. The area was photographed from the air by the U.S. Navy in 1966, and was surveyed by British Antarctic Survey in their 1970–73 expedition. It was named in 1977 by the UK-APC for the Helm Wind, an easterly gale in the lee of the northern Pennines of England.
- Simoom Hill (69°28′S 67°56′W), which rises to 640 m (2,100 ft), is located 4.8 km (3.0 mi) east of Mount Edgell. It was named in 1977 by the UK-APC for the Simoom, the warm south wind that blows off the Arabian Desert.
