= Khamsin (disambiguation) =

Khamsin is a hot spring wind in the Middle East. It may also refer to:

- Khamsin, a socialist magazine published between 1975 and 1989
- Khamsin, a character in Metal Gear Rising: Revengeance
- Khamsin Nbh'w (Flame Haze), a character in Shakugan no Shana
- Khamsin Pass, an Antarctic pass running north–south between Relay Hills and the Kinnear Mountains
- Eremiaphila khamsin, a species of praying mantis native to Egypt and Yemen
- Maserati Khamsin, a sports car
