= Mount Timosthenes =

Mountain in Graham Land, Antarctica

Mount Timosthenes (69°8′S 65°57′W) is a prominent peak between the head of Hariot Glacier and the north side of Airy Glacier, 3 nautical miles (6 km) northwest of Peregrinus Peak, in central Antarctic Peninsula. Photographed from the air by United States Antarctic Service (USAS), September 28, 1940, and by Ronne Antarctic Research Expedition (RARE), November 27, 1947. Surveyed by Falkland Islands Dependencies Survey (FIDS) in December 1958. Named by United Kingdom Antarctic Place-Names Committee (UK-APC) after Aristotle Timosthenes of Rhodes, chief pilot of King Ptolemy II (285-246 BC), who wrote sailing directions and devised the windrose of 8 or 12 winds, later developed into the points of the compass.
