= Peregrinus Peak =

Mountain in Antarctica

Highest point
- Elevation: 1,915 m (6,283 ft)
- Coordinates: 69°9′S 65°50′W

Geography
- Location: Fallières Coast, Palmer Land, Antarctica

Peregrinus Peak (69°9′S 65°50′W) is a peak (1,915 m) along the north side of Airy Glacier, 3 nautical miles (6 km) southeast of Mount Timosthenes, in central Antarctic Peninsula. Photographed from the air by Ronne Antarctic Research Expedition (RARE) November 27, 1947. Surveyed by Falkland Islands Dependencies Survey (FIDS) in December 1958. Named by United Kingdom Antarctic Place-Names Committee (UK-APC) after Petrus Peregrinus de Maricourt, of Luceria, author of Epistola de magnete (1269), the first scientific treatise on the magnet.
