= Antarctandes =

Mountain range in Antarctica

Coordinates: 70°25′S 62°40′W

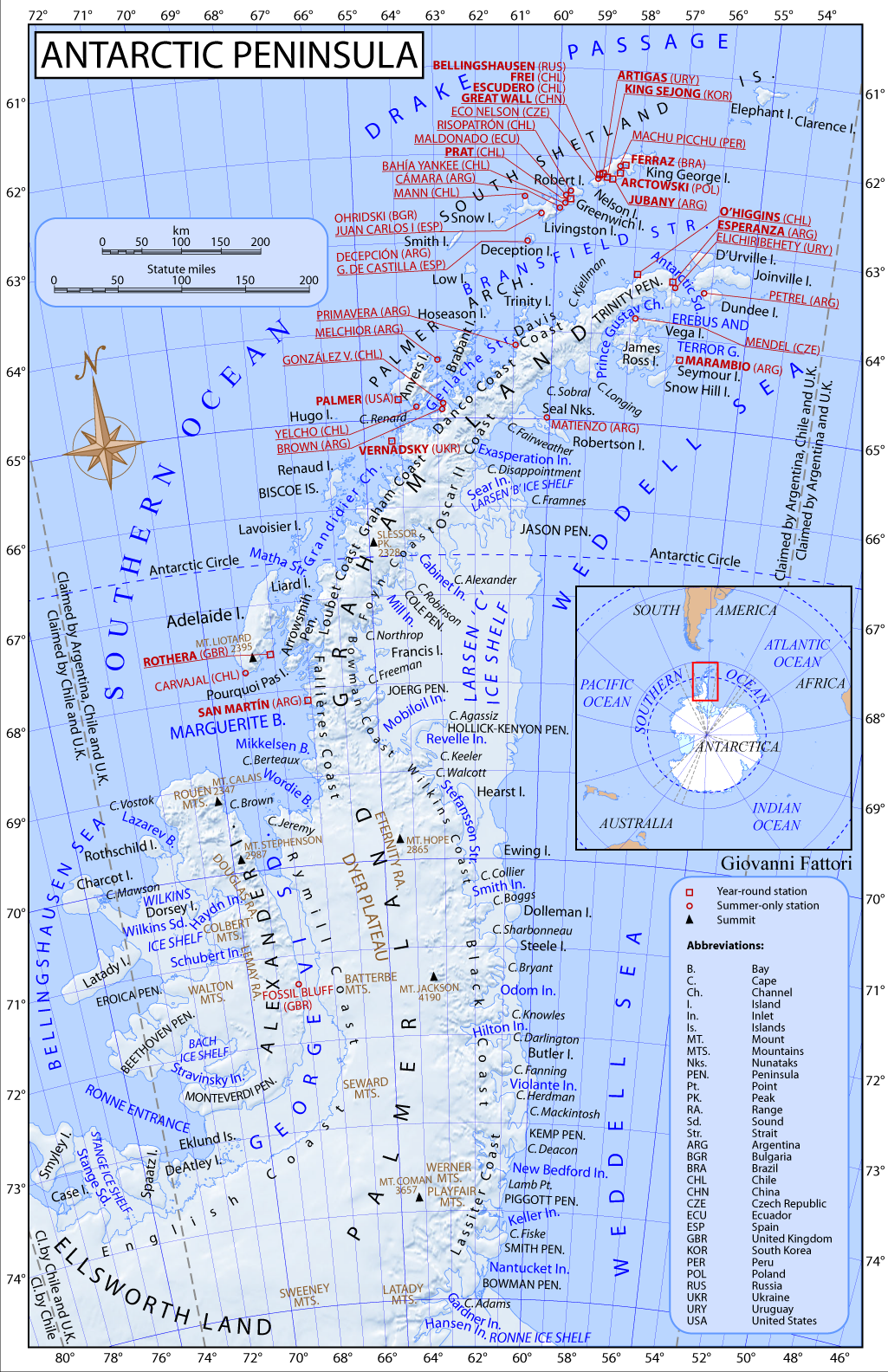
Map of the Antarctic Peninsula, with the Antarctandes Range in Graham Land & Palmer Land regions

The Antarctandes (Antartandes in Spanish), also known as the Antarctic Peninsula cordillera, is the mountain range that is located on the northern Antarctic Peninsula, in the Graham Land and Palmer Land regions of Antarctica and may also be considered to extend across the continent.

== Geology ==
Some geologists consider the Antarctandes a southernmost continuation of the Andes Range System on Antarctica. According to this theory the Andes start at the border between Colombia and Venezuela; run along western South America; submerge into the Atlantic Ocean to the east of Tierra del Fuego to form the underwater Scotia Arc mountain range; resurface periodically in the Shag Rocks, South Georgia and the South Sandwich Islands, South Orkney Islands and South Shetland Islands; and finally resurface on the northern Antarctic Peninsula. Chile calls the peninsula Tierra de O'Higgins, and Argentina Tierra de San Martín.

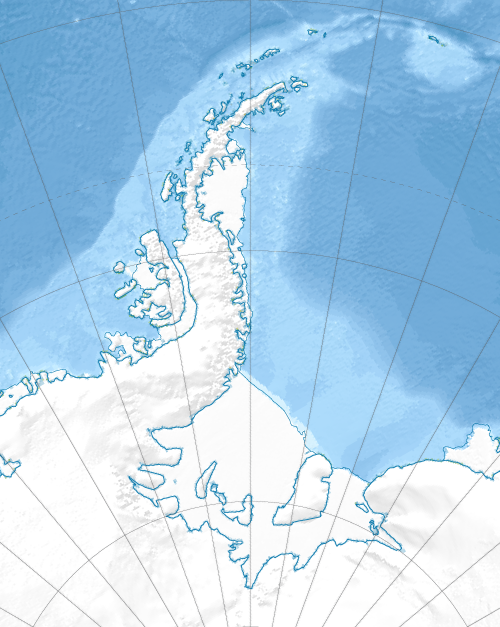
Relief map of the Antarctandes Range on the northern Antarctic Peninsula

== Geography ==
The highest mountain of the Peninsular Antarctandes is Mount Hope (3,239 m) in the Eternity Range in Palmer Land.

To the southwest, the Antarctandes continue as the Ellsworth Mountains, the highest mountain range in Antarctica and much-covered by glaciers in Palmer Land; then through the Whitmore Mountains to the Queen Maud Mountains. From there, the Antarctandes follow the western coast of the Ross Sea to Cape Adare. The major transcontinental Transantarctic Mountains System shares the Cape Adare to Queen Maud ranges with the Antarctandes but then veers east along the eastern coast of the Weddell Sea. To the southeast of the Antarctic Peninsula, the Antarctic Plateau extends to the South Pole. The Antarctandes thus form a serpentine arc, over 5,000 kilometres long, along the southern rim of the Pacific Ring of Fire.

The Peninsular Antarctandes range is claimed by Argentina for Argentine Antarctica, Chile for Chilean Antarctic Territory, and the United Kingdom for the British Antarctic Territory. All these claims are frozen by Article 4 of the 1960s Antarctic Treaty System.

== See also ==
- Antarctic Peninsula topics
