= Mount Gilbert (Antarctica) =

Mountain in Graham Land, Antarctica

Mount Gilbert (69°16′S 66°17′W) is a mountain, 1,420 metres (4,660 ft) high, on the divide between Airy Glacier and Seller Glacier, 5 miles (8 km) northwest of Mount Castro, in the west-central Antarctic Peninsula.

It was photographed from the air by the British Graham Land Expedition in February 1937, and the Ronne Antarctic Research Expedition in November 1947. It was surveyed from the ground by the Falkland Islands Dependencies Survey in December 1958, and was named by the UK Antarctic Place-Names Committee for William Gilbert, an English physician whose pioneer work De magnete, magneticisque corporibus (1600) laid the foundations for an understanding of earth magnetism and the variation of the compass.
