= Brodie Peak =

Rock peak in the central Antarctic Peninsula

Brodie Peak (69°25′S 66°5′W) is one of the Bristly Peaks, rising to 1,410 metres (4,630 ft) 5 nautical miles (9 km) south-southeast of Mount Castro, in the central Antarctic Peninsula. It was named by the Advisory Committee on Antarctic Names in 1977 after Earl E. Brodie, a United States Antarctic Research Program engineer in the Palmer Station winter party, 1969.
