= Bristly Peaks =

Series of peaks in Antarctica

The Bristly Peaks (69°23′S 66°15′W) are a series of sharp, rock peaks on a ridge separating Seller Glacier and Fleming Glacier in the central Antarctic Peninsula. They were photographed from the air by the British Graham Land Expedition in 1937, and by the Ronne Antarctic Research Expedition in 1947. They were surveyed by the Falkland Islands Dependencies Survey in 1958 and 1960. The name, applied by the UK Antarctic Place-Names Committee, is descriptive of the sharp peaks which suggest the bristles of a brush.

The Bristly Peaks include the Messent Peak and the Brodie Peak.
