= Messent =

Messent may refer to:

== People ==
- Claire Messent, an Australian field hockey player

== Places ==
- Messent Conservation Park, a protected area in South Australia
- Messent Peak, a mountain in Antarctica
- Hundred of Messent, a cadastral unit in South Australia
