= Page Bluff =

Page Bluff (69°38′S 66°11′W) is a bluff rising to about 1,250 m at the east end of Crescent Scarp in northern Palmer Land. Photographed from the air by United States Antarctic Service (USAS), 1940, and surveyed by Falkland Islands Dependencies Survey (FIDS), 1958. Named by Advisory Committee on Antarctic Names (US-ACAN) in 1977 after John H. Page, geodesist, U.S. Army Topographic Command (later Defense Mapping Agency, Hydrographic/Topographic Center), Scientific Leader, Palmer Station, winter party 1969.
