= Brategg Bank =

- Submerged bank
- Brategg Bank (Antarctica)
- Ocean: Southern Ocean

Brategg Bank (65°16′S 68°35′W) is an undersea bank off the Antarctic Peninsula in Antarctica. It was named in July 1964 by the Advisory Committee for Undersea Features.
