= Deschanel Peak =

Mountain in Antarctica

Deschanel Peak (68°55′S 67°14′W) is the summit of an isolated, partly ice-covered mountain, 750 metres (2,460 ft) high, rising from the south part of the glacier close southeast of Cape Berteaux on the west coast of the Antarctic Peninsula. The approved name derives from "Sommet Deschanel" given by J.B. Charcot, leader of the French Antarctic Expedition, in January 1909.
