= Webb Peak (Palmer Land) =

Webb Peak (69°38′S 66°28′W) is a peak rising to 1,480 m at the west end of Crescent Scarp in northern Palmer Land. The peak was photographed from the air by the United States Antarctic Service (USAS), 1940, and surveyed by Falkland Islands Dependencies Survey (FIDS), 1958. Named by Advisory Committee on Antarctic Names (US-ACAN) in 1977 after John E. Webb, geodesist, U.S. Army Topographic Command (later Defense Mapping Agency Hydrographic/Topographic Center), a member of the Palmer Station winter party, 1969.
