= List of highest points in the United Kingdom =

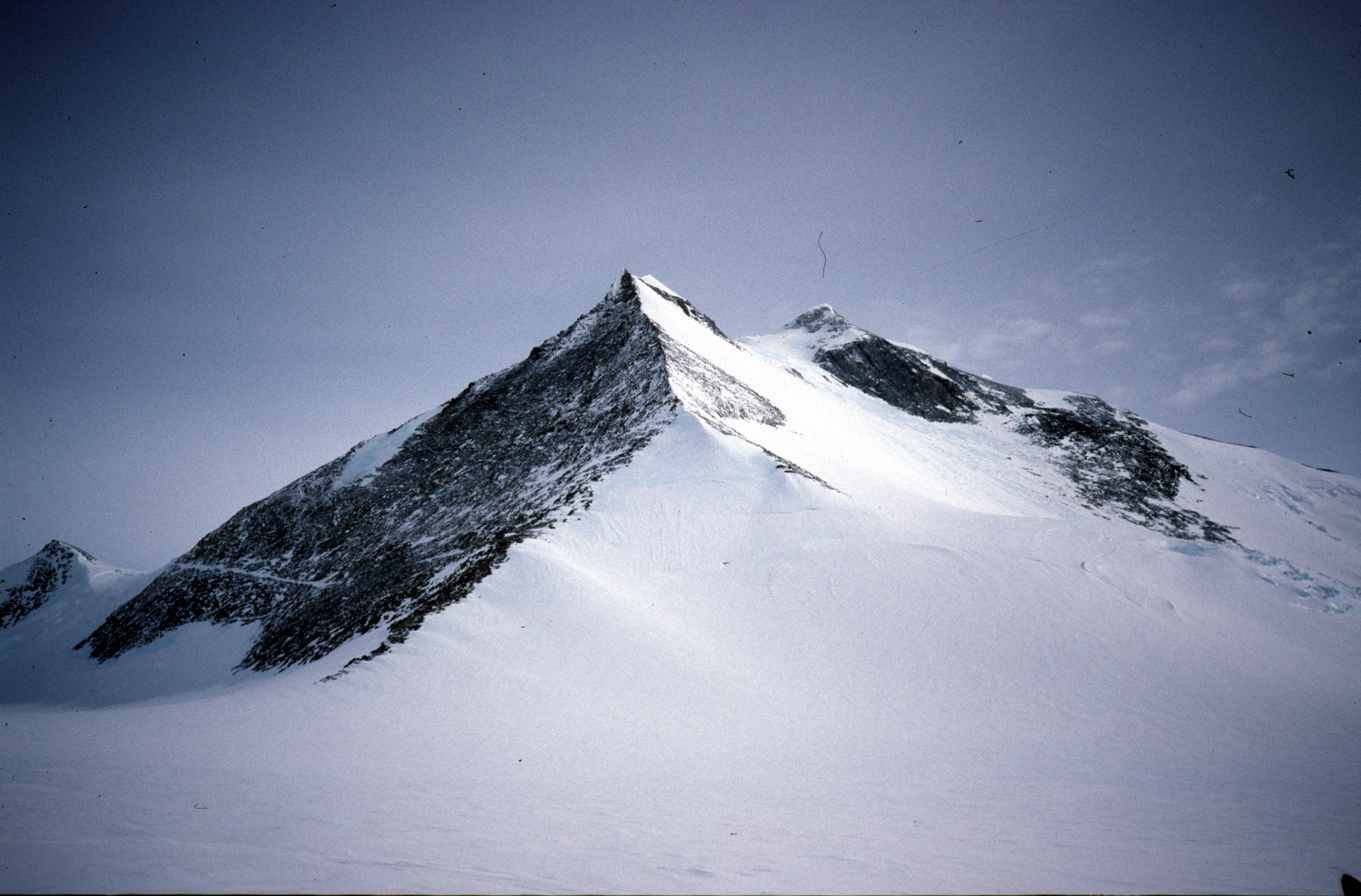
Mount Hope is the tallest peak in a territory claimed by the UK

This list shows the highest points found in the United Kingdom.

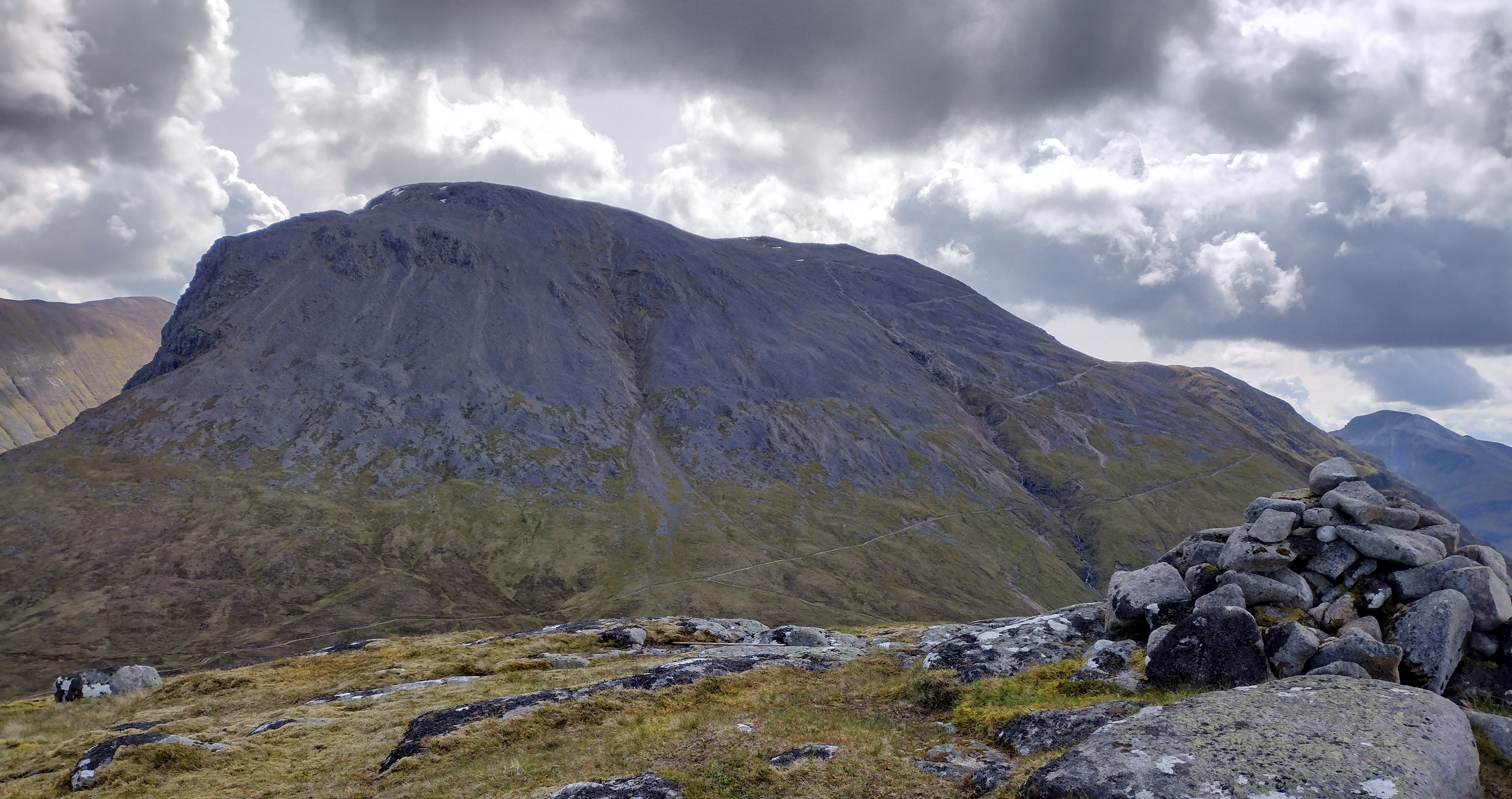
Ben Nevis is the tallest peak in the island Great Britain

== Tallest peaks of UK sovereign territory ==
Includes British Overseas Territories, which are not part of the United Kingdom.

Rank	Name	Height	Location
1 (The tallest mountain in a territory claimed by the UK)	Mount Hope	3,239 metres (10,627 ft)	British Antarctic Territory
2	Mount Jackson	3,184 metres (10,446 ft)	British Antarctic Territory
3	Mount Stephenson	2,987 metres (9,800 ft)	British Antarctic Territory
4	Mount Paget	2,937 metres (9,636 ft)	South Georgia and the South Sandwich Islands
5	Mount Francais	2,760 metres (9,055 ft)	British Antarctic Territory
6	Mount Parry	2,520 metres (8,268 ft)	British Antarctic Territory
7	Nordenskjöld Peak	2,354 metres (7,723 ft)	South Georgia and the South Sandwich Islands
8	Mount Carse	2,339 metres (7,674 ft)	South Georgia and the South Sandwich Islands
9	Mount Sugartop	2,323 metres (7,621 ft)	South Georgia and the South Sandwich Islands
10	Mount Gaudry	2,315 metres (7,595 ft)	British Antarctic Territory
14 (The tallest peak on a territory with a permanent population)	Queen Mary's Peak	2,062 metres (6,765 ft)	Tristan Da Cunha
23 (The tallest peak in Great Britain and Scotland)	Ben Nevis	1,345 metres (4,413 ft)	Scotland
The tallest peak in Wales	Snowdon	1,085 metres (3,560 ft)	Wales
The tallest peak in England	Scafell Pike	978 metres (3,209 ft)	England
The tallest peak in Northern Ireland	Slieve Donard	850 metres (2,789 ft)	Northern Ireland

== Counties ==
See List of English counties by highest point for tops of the metropolitan and non-metropolitan counties, and List of counties of England and Wales in 1964 by highest point for historic county tops.

== Hill ranges in England ==
- Lake District – Scafell Pike at 978 metres (3,209 ft)
- Pennines – Cross Fell at 893 metres (2,930 ft)
- Cheviot Hills – The Cheviot at 815 metres (2,674 ft)
- Pennines – Mickle Fell at 788 metres (2,585 ft)
- Yorkshire Dales National Park – Whernside at 736 metres (2,415 ft)
- Black Mountains (within England) – Black Mountain, at 703 metres (2,306 ft)
- Peak District – Kinder Scout at 636 metres (2,087 ft)
- Dartmoor – High Willhays at 621 metres (2,037 ft)
- Shropshire Hills – Brown Clee Hill at 540 metres (1,772 ft)
- Exmoor – Dunkery Beacon at 519 metres (1,703 ft)
- Malvern Hills – Worcestershire Beacon at 425 metres (1,394 ft)
- North York Moors – Round Hill at 424 metres (1,391 ft)
- Bodmin Moor – Brown Willy at 420 metres (1,378 ft)
- Cotswolds – Cleeve Hill at 330 metres (1,083 ft)
- Mendip Hills – Beacon Batch at 325 metres (1,066 ft)
- Salisbury Plain – Walbury Hill at 297 metres (974 ft)
- Greensand Ridge – Leith Hill at 294 metres (965 ft)
- South Downs – Butser Hill at 271 metres (889 ft)
- North Downs – Botley Hill at 270 metres (886 ft)
- Chilterns – Haddington Hill at 267 metres (876 ft)
- Yorkshire Wolds – Bishop Wilton Wold at 246 metres (807 ft)
- Lincolnshire Wolds – Wolds Top at 168 metres (551 ft)

== London ==
- List of highest points in London
