= Rendezvous Rocks =

The Rendezvous Rocks (69°35′S 67°38′W) is an isolated line of south-facing crags (about 945 m), located south of Khamsin Pass and 5 nautical miles (9 km) southwest of the Kinnear Mountains on the west side of the Antarctic Peninsula. Surveyed by British Antarctic Survey (BAS), 1970–72, and so named because the feature was used as a rendezvous for two sledge parties traveling from opposite sides of the plateau in 1970.
