= Mount Hope (Palmer Land) =

Mountain in Palmer Land, Antarctica

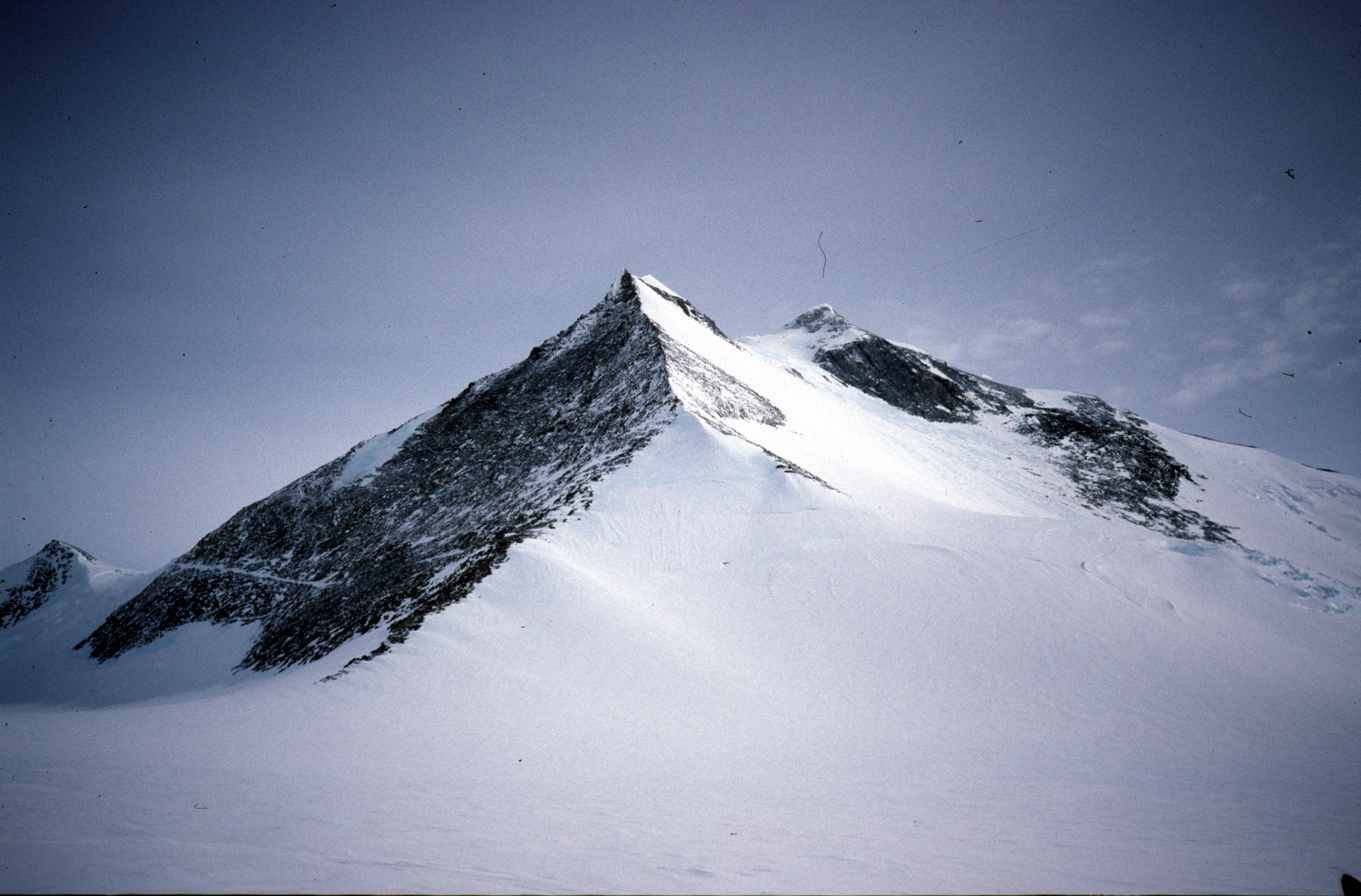
- South face of Mount Hope, in oblique view from the east.

Highest point
- Elevation: 3,239 metres (10,627 ft)
- Listing: Ultra
- Coordinates: 69°45′35″S 64°33′19″W

Geography
- Location within Antarctica
- Location: Palmer Land, Antarctic Peninsula, Antarctica
- Parent range: Eternity Range, Antarctandes

Mount Hope is a mountain rising to 3,239 metres (10,627 ft), forming the central and highest peak of the Eternity Range in northern Palmer Land, Antarctic Peninsula, Antarctica. It is within the British Antarctic Territory, Chilean Antarctic Territory, and Argentine Antarctica claims. Following a 2017 survey by the British Antarctic Survey team, Mount Hope was found to be higher than previously thought. It is the highest point in the British Antarctic Territory and the claimed lands of the United Kingdom.

== Names ==
It was first seen from the air and named Mount Hope by Lincoln Ellsworth during his flights of November 21 and 23, 1935. This mountain is one of three major mountains in Ellsworth's Eternity Range to which he gave the names Faith, Hope, and Charity.

The mountain was surveyed a year later in November 1936 and given the name "Mount Wakefield" by J.R. Rymill of the British Graham Land Expedition. The feature was subsequently photographed from the air by the United States Antarctic Service in September 1940, and by the Ronne Antarctic Research Expedition in December 1947. A careful study of the reports, maps, and photographs of these expeditions, as well as an additional survey of the area by the Falkland Islands Dependencies Survey in 1960, has led to the conclusion that Ellsworth's Mount Hope and Rymill's Mount Wakefield are synonymous. For the sake of historical continuity the name Mount Hope has been retained for this mountain and the name Wakefield has been transferred to Wakefield Highland located to the northwest.

== See also ==
- List of ultras of Antarctica
