= Mount Leo =

Mountain in Graham Land, Antarctica

Mount Leo (69°29′S 67°0′W) is an isolated mountain, 1,270 metres (4,170 ft) high, at the southeast margin of Forster Ice Piedmont on the west side of the Antarctic Peninsula. The mountain has steep rock cliffs on its south side. It was first roughly surveyed by the British Graham Land Expedition, 1936–37, was photographed from the air by the Ronne Antarctic Research Expedition, 1947, and resurveyed by the Falkland Islands Dependencies Survey, 1958. The name applied by the UK Antarctic Place-Names Committee is suggestive of the shape of the feature, which resembles a recumbent lion.
