= Prospect Glacier =

Glacier in Antarctica

Prospect Glacier (69°32′S 67°20′W) is a glacier between Kinnear Mountains and Mayer Hills, flowing north into Forster Ice Piedmont on the west coast of Antarctic Peninsula. It was first roughly surveyed in 1936 by the British Graham Land Expedition (BGLE) under Rymill. In 1954 the United Kingdom Antarctic Place-Names Committee (UK-APC) gave the name Prospect Pass to a col between Eureka Glacier and the glacier here described. During resurvey of the area by the Falkland Islands Dependencies Survey (FIDS) in 1958, the col was found to be an indeterminate feature, while this glacier is well marked and requires a name.
