= Mount Castro =

Mountain in Palmer Land, Antarctica

Mount Castro (69°20′S 66°4′W) is a mountain, 1,630 metres (5,350 ft) high, on the north side of Seller Glacier, 5 nautical miles (9 km) southeast of Mount Gilbert, in the central Antarctic Peninsula. It was photographed from the air by the British Graham Land Expedition in 1937, and by the Ronne Antarctic Research Expedition in 1947. It was surveyed from the ground by the Falkland Islands Dependencies Survey in December 1958, and named by the UK Antarctic Place-Names Committee for João de Castro, a Portuguese navigator who made pioneer experimental investigations of the variation of the magnetic compass.
