= Kinnear Mountains =

Mountain range in Graham Land, Antarctica

The Kinnear Mountains (69°32′S 67°40′W) are a small group of mountains, rising above 875 metres (2,870 ft), standing west of Prospect Glacier at the south margin of the Wordie Ice Shelf, on the west coast of the Antarctic Peninsula. They were discovered and roughly surveyed in 1936 by the British Graham Land Expedition (BGLE) under John Rymill. The name was proposed by members of the BGLE for Sir Norman B. Kinnear, a British ornithologist who, as a member of the staff of the British Museum (Natural History), was of great assistance to the BGLE.

== See also ==
- Rendezvous Rocks
