= Crescent Scarp =

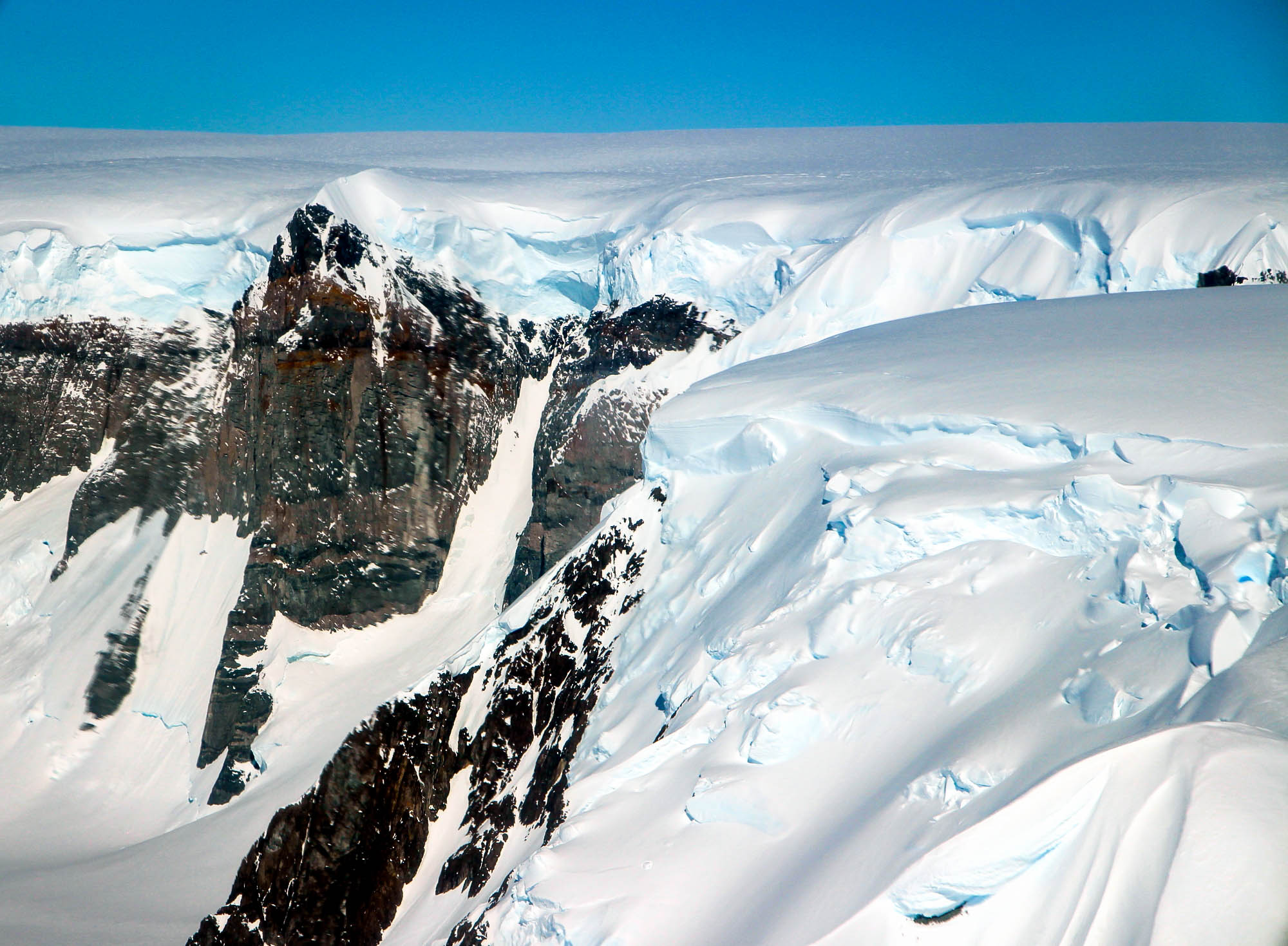
Crescent Scarp

Crescent Scarp (69°39′S 66°20′W) is a conspicuous, north-facing escarpment of rock and ice cliffs, rising to 1,400 metres (4,600 ft) on the south side of Fleming Glacier in northern Palmer Land. It was roughly surveyed from the ground by the British Graham Land Expedition in 1936–37, and photographed from the air by the United States Antarctic Service in 1940 and the Ronne Antarctic Research Expedition in 1947. It was resurveyed by the Falkland Islands Dependencies Survey in 1958, and named descriptively.

== See also ==
- Page Bluff
