= Forster Ice Piedmont =

Ice piedmont along the coast of the Antarctic Peninsula

Forster Ice Piedmont (69°22′S 67°0′W) is an ice piedmont lying landward of the Wordie Ice Shelf, along the west coast of the Antarctic Peninsula. It is formed by the confluence of Airy, Seller, Fleming and Prospect Glaciers and is about 25 miles (40 km) long from north to south and 12 miles (20 km) wide.

The feature was first surveyed from the ground by the British Graham Land Expedition in 1936–37, and again in more detail by Peter D. Forster and P. Gibbs of the Falkland Islands Dependencies Survey (FIDS) in 1958. It was named by the UK Antarctic Place-Names Committee after Forster, a surveyor at Stonington Island in 1958 and at Horseshoe Island in 1960.
