= Fleming Glacier =

Glacier in Antarctica

Fleming Glacier (69°25′S 66°40′W) is a broad glacier 25 nautical miles (46 km) long on the west side of the Antarctic Peninsula, flowing west-northwest and terminating in Forster Ice Piedmont to the east of the Wordie Ice Shelf. The glacier was charted by the British Graham Land Expedition (BGLE) under John Rymill, 1934–37, and was photographed from the air by the United States Antarctic Service on September 29, 1940. This hitherto unnamed feature was named by the Advisory Committee on Antarctic Names in 1947 for Reverend W.L.S. Fleming, Dean of Trinity Hall, Cambridge University; also, chaplain, chief scientist, and geologist of the BGLE.
