= Airy Glacier =

Glacier in Antarctica

- Location within Antarctic Peninsula Location within Antarctica
- Location: Antarctic Peninsula
- Coordinates: 69°13′S 66°20′W
- Length: 20 nmi (37 km; 23 mi)
- Width: 6 nmi (11 km; 7 mi)
- Thickness: unknown
- Terminus: Forster Ice Piedmont
- Status: unknown

The Airy Glacier (69°13′S 66°20′W) is a glacier 20 nautical miles (37 km) long and 6 nautical miles (11 km) wide, flowing west to the northeast portion of Forster Ice Piedmont, near the west coast of the Antarctic Peninsula.

The glacier was first roughly surveyed by British Graham Land Expedition of 1936–37, then photographed from the air by the Ronne Antarctic Research Expedition in 1947, and surveyed by Falkland Islands Dependencies Survey in 1958. It was named by United Kingdom Antarctic Place-Names Committee for George Biddell Airy, British Astronomer Royal, who in 1839 introduced a method of correcting magnetic compasses for deviation.

== See also ==
- List of glaciers in the Antarctic
- Norman Peak
