= Thompson Hill =

Ridge on Alexander Island, Antarctica

Location of Alexander Island in the Antarctic Peninsula region

Satellite image of Alexander Island

Thompson Hill (Bulgarian: хълм Томпсън, ‘Halm Thompson’ \'h&lm 'tomp-s&n\) is the mostly ice-covered ridge rising to 934 m in central Sofia University Mountains, northern Alexander Island in Antarctica. It surmounts Nichols Snowfield to the southeast and Poste Valley to the northeast. The vicinity was visited on 2 February 1988 by the geological survey team of Christo Pimpirev and Borislav Kamenov (First Bulgarian Antarctic Expedition), and Philip Nell and Peter Marquis (British Antarctic Survey).

The feature is named after the settlement of Thompson in Western Bulgaria, in connection with Major Frank Thompson (1920-1944), head of the British military mission to the Bulgarian resistance during World War II.

== Location ==
Thompson Hill is located at 69°28′54.7″S 71°20′02″W, which is 4.34 km northeast of Mount Kliment Ohridski, 8.75 km east of Mount Wilbye in Lassus Mountains, 6.93 km southeast of Mount Braun, 4.2 km west of Vola Ridge, 10.9 km west by north of Lizard Nunatak and 8.12 km northwest of Shaw Nunatak. British mapping in 1971.

== Maps ==
- British Antarctic Territory. Scale 1:200000 topographic map. DOS 610 – W 69 70. Tolworth, UK, 1971
- Antarctic Digital Database (ADD). Scale 1:250000 topographic map of Antarctica. Scientific Committee on Antarctic Research (SCAR). Since 1993, regularly upgraded and updated
