= Aleksandrov Ridge =

Ridge on Alexander Island, Antarctica

Location of Alexander Island in the Antarctic Peninsula region

Satellite image of Alexander Island

Aleksandrov Ridge (Bulgarian: Александров рид, romanized: Aleksandrov rid, IPA: [ɐɫɛˈksandrof ˈrid]) is the rocky, partly ice-covered ridge extending 4.7 km in north-northeast to south-southwest direction and 1.7 km wide, rising to 768 m on the west side of Lassus Mountains, northern Alexander Island in Antarctica. It surmounts Narechen Glacier to the south-southeast and Lazarev Bay to the west. The feature is named after the Bulgarian geodesist Borislav Aleksandrov, surveyor at St. Kliment Ohridski base during the 1998/99 and subsequent seasons.

== Location ==
The ridge is located at 69°31′06.5″S 71°38′38″W, which is 10.24 km south by east of Mount Wilbye, 8.7 km southwest of Mount Kliment Ohridski in Sofia University Mountains, 8.77 km west of Rachenitsa Nunatak, 2.7 km north by west of Moriseni Peak and 9.5 km east by north of Faulkner Nunatak. British mapping in 1971.

== Maps ==
- British Antarctic Territory. Scale 1:200000 topographic map. DOS 610 – W 69 70. Tolworth, UK, 1971
- Antarctic Digital Database (ADD). Scale 1:250000 topographic map of Antarctica. Scientific Committee on Antarctic Research (SCAR). Since 1993, regularly upgraded and updated
