= Vola Ridge =

Ridge in Alexander Island, Antarctica

Location of Alexander Island in the Antarctic Peninsula region

Satellite image of Alexander Island

Vola Ridge (Bulgarian: рид Вола, ‘Rid Vola’ \'rid 'vo-la\) is the mostly ice-covered triple-peaked ridge extending 2.6 km in south-southeast to north-northwest direction and 1.1 km wide, with a central height rising to 879 m and southern one of 933 m on the southeast side of Sofia University Mountains in northern Alexander Island, Antarctica. It surmounts Poste Valley to the northwest and Nichols Snowfield to the southeast. The ridge was visited on 2 February 1988 by the geological survey team of Christo Pimpirev and Borislav Kamenov (First Bulgarian Antarctic Expedition), and Philip Nell and Peter Marquis (British Antarctic Survey).

The feature is named after the protected site of Vola in Western Balkan Mountains.

== Location ==
The central height of the ridge is located at 69°28′52″S 71°13′35″W, which is 7.41 km northeast of Mount Kliment Ohridski, 12.91 km east of Mount Wilbye in Lassus Mountains, 9.88 km southeast of Mount Braun, 6.41 km south-southwest of the central height of Landers Peaks, 6.03 km east-southeast of Lizard Nunatak and 7.04 km north of Shaw Nunatak.

== Maps ==
- British Antarctic Territory. Scale 1:200000 topographic map. DOS 610 – W 69 70. Tolworth, UK, 1971
- Antarctic Digital Database (ADD). Scale 1:250000 topographic map of Antarctica. Scientific Committee on Antarctic Research (SCAR). Since 1993, regularly upgraded and updated
