= Herbst Nunatak =

Nunatak on Alexander Island, Antarctica

Location of Alexander Island in the Antarctic Peninsula region

Satellite image of Alexander Island

Herbst Nunatak (Bulgarian: нунатак Хербст, ‘Nunatak Herbst’ \'nu-na-tak 'herbst\) is the partly ice-free ridge extending 1.1 km in southeast-northwest direction and 300 m wide, with a central height rising to 846 m and a southern one of 869 m on the southeast side of Sofia University Mountains in northern Alexander Island, Antarctica. It surmounts Poste Valley to the northwest and Nichols Snowfield to the southeast. The vicinity was visited on 2 February 1988 by the geological survey team of Christo Pimpirev and Borislav Kamenov (First Bulgarian Antarctic Expedition), and Philip Nell and Peter Marquis (British Antarctic Survey).

The feature is named after the Bulgarian journalist Yosif Herbst (1875-1925).

== Location ==
Herbst Nunatak is located at 69°27′50″S 71°12′10″W, which is 5.51 km east-northeast of Thompson Hill, 9.78 km southeast of Mount Braun, 4.32 km south-southwest of the central height of Landers Peaks and 6.12 km northwest of Lizard Nunatak. British mapping in 1971.

== Maps ==
- British Antarctic Territory. Scale 1:200000 topographic map. DOS 610 – W 69 70. Tolworth, UK, 1971
- Antarctic Digital Database (ADD). Scale 1:250000 topographic map of Antarctica. Scientific Committee on Antarctic Research (SCAR). Since 1993, regularly upgraded and updated
