= Tipits Knoll =

Ridge on Alexander Island, Antarctica

Location of Alexander Island in the Antarctic Peninsula region

Satellite image of Alexander Island

Tipits Knoll (Bulgarian: Типицка могила, ‘Tipitska Mogila’ \'ti-pits-ka mo-'gi-la\) is the mostly ice-covered ridge extending 800 m in north–south direction and 470 m wide, rising to 1060 m and forming the south extremity of Sofia University Mountains in northern Alexander Island, Antarctica. The knoll surmounts Nichols Snowfield to the southeast. It was visited on 2 February 1988 by the geological survey team of Christo Pimpirev and Borislav Kamenov (First Bulgarian Antarctic Expedition), and Philip Nell and Peter Marquis (British Antarctic Survey).

The feature is named after Tipits Peak in Pirin Mountains, Bulgaria.

== Location ==
Tipits Knoll is located at 69°32′09″S 71°19′56″W, which is 3.12 km southeast of Mount Kliment Ohridski, 7.33 km southwest of Vola Ridge, 4.23 km west-northwest of Shaw Nunatak and 8.22 km northeast of Mount Devol in Lassus Mountains. British mapping in 1971.

== Maps ==
- British Antarctic Territory. Scale 1:200000 topographic map. DOS 610 – W 69 70. Tolworth, UK, 1971
- Antarctic Digital Database (ADD). Scale 1:250000 topographic map of Antarctica. Scientific Committee on Antarctic Research (SCAR). Since 1993, regularly upgraded and updated
