= Zavoy Nunatak =

Nunatak on Alexander Island, Antarctica

Location of Alexander Island in the Antarctic Peninsula region

Satellite image of Alexander Island

Zavoy Nunatak (Bulgarian: нунатак Завой, ‘Nunatak Zavoy’ \'nu-na-tak za-'voy\) is the mostly ice-free rocky ridge extending 2.8 km in north-northwest to south-southeast direction and 1.4 km wide, rising to 920 m on the west side of Elgar Uplands in northern Alexander Island, Antarctica. It surmounts Nichols Snowfield to the northwest, Gilbert Glacier to the southwest, and the head of Bartók Glacier to the southeast. The vicinity was visited on 30 January 1988 by the geological survey team of Christo Pimpirev and Borislav Kamenov (First Bulgarian Antarctic Expedition), and Philip Nell and Peter Marquis (British Antarctic Survey).

The feature is named after the settlement of Zavoy in Southeastern Bulgaria.

== Location ==
The ridge is located at 69°39′46.4″S 71°06′37″W, which is 7.57 km north of Appalachia Nunataks, 15.38 km east of Mount Morley in Lassus Mountains, 14 km south-southeast of Shaw Nunatak, 9.42 km south-southwest of Tegra Nunatak and 7.52 km west-northwest of Kozhuh Peak.

== Maps ==
- British Antarctic Territory. Scale 1:200000 topographic map. DOS 610 – W 69 70. Tolworth, UK, 1971
- Antarctic Digital Database (ADD). Scale 1:250000 topographic map of Antarctica. Scientific Committee on Antarctic Research (SCAR). Since 1993, regularly upgraded and updated
