= Vaskidovich Ridge =

Ridge on Alexander Island, Antarctica

Location of Alexander Island in the Antarctic Peninsula region

Satellite image of Alexander Island

Vaskidovich Ridge (Bulgarian: Васкидович рид, ‘Vaskidovich Rid’ \va-'ski-do-vich 'rid\) is the mostly ice-covered ridge extending 4.6 km in east-west direction and 1.5 km wide, rising to 1518 m at its east extremity, situated on the west side of Rouen Mountains in northern Alexander Island, Antarctica. The ridge surmounts Nichols Snowfield to the west-southwest. It was visited on 28 January 1988 by the geological survey team of Christo Pimpirev and Borislav Kamenov (First Bulgarian Antarctic Expedition), and Philip Nell and Peter Marquis (British Antarctic Survey).

The feature is named after the Bulgarian National Revival enlightener Emanuil Vaskidovich (1795-1875).

== Location ==
Vaskidovich Ridge is located at 69°23′05″S 70°49′24″W, which is just north of the west entrance to Golden Pass, 10.32 km north-northeast of Serpent Nunatak, 14.73 km east-northeast of the central height of Landers Peaks in Sofia University Mountains, 12.6 km southwest of Mount Sanderson and 15.25 km west-southwest of Mount Cupola. British mapping in 1971.

== Maps ==
- British Antarctic Territory. Scale 1:200000 topographic map. DOS 610 – W 69 70. Tolworth, UK, 1971
- Antarctic Digital Database (ADD). Scale 1:250000 topographic map of Antarctica. Scientific Committee on Antarctic Research (SCAR). Since 1993, regularly upgraded and updated
