= Bulgarian toponyms in Antarctica (T) =

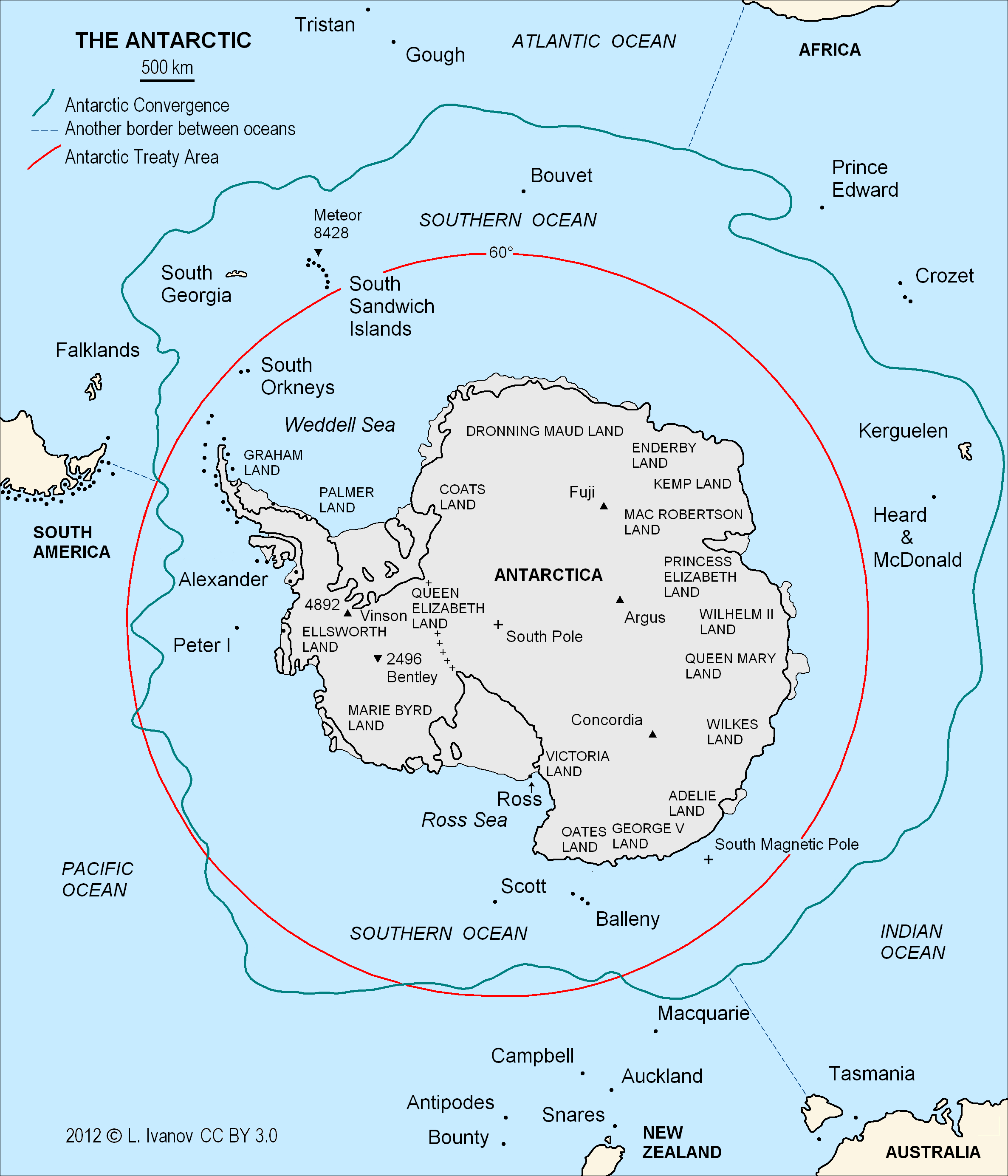
The South Polar Region.

- Takev Point, Foyn Coast
- Talaskara Ridge, Alexander Island
- Talev Glacier, Graham Coast
- Tambra Island, Biscoe Islands
- Tangra Mountains, Livingston Island
- Tarakchiev Point, Davis Coast
- Taralezh Island, Wilhelm Archipelago
- Taran Plateau, Brabant Island
- Targovishte Glacier, Greenwich Island
- Taridin Ridge, Oscar II Coast
- Tarnovo Ice Piedmont, Livingston Island
- Tashukov Nunatak, Nordenskjöld Coast
- Tatarchev Nunatak, Oscar II Coast
- Tatul Island, Robert Island
- Tegra Nunatak, Alexander Island
- Telerig Nunatak, Greenwich Island
- Telish Rock, Livingston Island
- Temenuga Island, Anvers Island
- Tepava Ridge, Oscar II Coast
- Teres Ridge, Livingston Island
- Terimer Point, Greenwich Island
- Terter Peak, Greenwich Island
- Tervel Peak, Livingston Island
- Teshel Cove, Low Island
- Teteven Glacier, Greenwich Island
- Thamyris Glacier, Anvers Island
- Thompson Hill, Alexander Island
- Ticha Peak, Livingston Island
- Tigan Island, Wilhelm Archipelago
- Tikale Peak, Oscar II Coast
- Tile Ridge, Greenwich Island
- Timok Cove, Rugged Island
- Tintyava Peak, Trinity Peninsula
- Tipits Knoll, Alexander Island
- Tirizis Island, Robert Island
- Tizoin Point, Trinity Island
- Tlachene Cove, Loubet Coast
- Todorova Island, Biscoe Islands
- Toledo Island, Livingston Island
- Topola Ridge, Davis Coast
- Toros Peak, Sentinel Range
- Trajan Gate, Trinity Peninsula
- Trakiya Heights, Trinity Peninsula
- Trambesh Peak, Brabant Island
- Tran Crag, Livingston Island
- Transmarisca Bay, Krogh Island
- Trave Peak, Nordenskjöld Coast
- Travnik Buttress, Oscar II Coast
- Trebishte Island, Anvers Island
- Treklyano Island, Robert Island
- Trepetlika Glacier, Danco Coast
- Treskavets Glacier, Clarence Island
- Triangulation Beach, Nelson Island
- Trifonov Point, Elephant Island
- Trifonova Point, Livingston Island
- Trigrad Gap, Livingston Island
- Triznatsi Rocks, Nelson Island
- Troughton Rocks, Snow Island
- Troyan Peak, Livingston Island
- Tryavna Peak, Livingston Island
- Tsamblak Hill, Livingston Island
- Tsankov Island, Wilhelm Archipelago
- Tsarevets Buttress, Trinity Peninsula
- Tsarigrad Peak, Smith Island
- Tsepina Cove, Robert Island
- Mount Tsotsorkov, Danco Coast
- Tuida Cove, Nelson Island
- Tumba Ice Cap, Graham Land
- Tundzha Glacier, Livingston Island
- Tutrakan Peak, Livingston Island
- Tvarditsa Rocks, Greenwich Island
- Tyulen Island, Wilhelm Archipelago

== See also ==
- Bulgarian toponyms in Antarctica

== Bibliography ==
- J. Stewart. Antarctica: An Encyclopedia. Jefferson, N.C. and London: McFarland, 2011. 1771 pp. ISBN 978-0-7864-3590-6
- L. Ivanov. Bulgarian Names in Antarctica. Sofia: Manfred Wörner Foundation, 2021. Second edition. 539 pp. ISBN 978-619-90008-5-4 (in Bulgarian)
- G. Bakardzhieva. Bulgarian toponyms in Antarctica. Paisiy Hilendarski University of Plovdiv: Research Papers. Vol. 56, Book 1, Part A, 2018 – Languages and Literature, pp. 104-119 (in Bulgarian)
- L. Ivanov and N. Ivanova. Bulgarian names. In: The World of Antarctica. Generis Publishing, 2022. pp. 114-115. ISBN 979-8-88676-403-1
