= Mount Balkanska =

Mountain on Alexander Island, Antarctica

Location of Alexander Island in the Antarctic Peninsula region

Satellite image of Alexander Island

Mount Balkanska (Bulgarian: връх Балканска, romanized: vrah Balkanska, IPA: [ˈvrɤɣ bɐɫˈkanskɐ]) is the mostly ice-covered mountain rising to 1344 m in Lassus Mountains, northern Alexander Island in Antarctica. It has steep and partly ice-free southwest slopes, and surmounts Nichols Snowfield to the east and Narechen Glacier to the northwest.

The feature is named after the Bulgarian operetta singer Mimi Balkanska.

== Location ==
Mount Balkanska is located at 69°37′47″S 71°29′55″W, which is 2.53 km south-southwest of Moriseni Peak, 16.2 km west of Nebush Nunatak in Elgar Uplands, 4.26 km north of Mount Morley and 4.57 km east-southeast of Beagle Peak. British mapping in 1971.

== Maps ==
- British Antarctic Territory. Scale 1:200000 topographic map. DOS 610 – W 69 70. Tolworth, UK, 1971
- Antarctic Digital Database (ADD). Scale 1:250000 topographic map of Antarctica. Scientific Committee on Antarctic Research (SCAR). Since 1993, regularly upgraded and updated
