= Mount Devol =

Mountain on Alexander Island, Antarctica

Location of Alexander Island in the Antarctic Peninsula region

Satellite image of Alexander Island

Mount Devol (Bulgarian: връх Девол, romanized: vrah Devol, IPA: [ˈvrɤɣ dɛˈvɔɫ]) is an ice-covered mountain rising to 1626 m in Lassus Mountains, northern Alexander Island in Antarctica. It surmounts Nichols Snowfield to the east and Narechen Glacier to the west. The feature is named after the town and region of Devol in medieval Southwestern Bulgaria.

== Location ==
The mountain is located at 69°35′08″S 71°29′15″W, which is 10.24 km south by east of Mount Wilbye, 8.7 km southwest of Mount Kliment Ohridski in Sofia University Mountains, 8.77 km west of Rachenitsa Nunatak, 2.7 km north by west of Moriseni Peak and 9.5 km east by north of Faulkner Nunatak.

== Maps ==
- British Antarctic Territory. Scale 1:200000 topographic map. DOS 610 – W 69 70. Tolworth, UK, 1971
- Antarctic Digital Database (ADD). Scale 1:250000 topographic map of Antarctica. Scientific Committee on Antarctic Research (SCAR). Since 1993, regularly upgraded and updated
