= Lesnovo Hill =

Location of Alexander Island in the Antarctic Peninsula region

Satellite image of Alexander Island

Lesnovo Hill (Bulgarian: хълм Лесново, ‘Halm Lesnovo’ \'h&lm le-'sno-vo) is the mostly ice-covered hill rising to 1286 m at the west extremity of Care Heights in Rouen Mountains, northern Alexander Island in Antarctica. It surmounts Nichols Snowfield to the west. The hill was visited on 28 January 1988 by the geological survey team of Christo Pimpirev and Borislav Kamenov (First Bulgarian Antarctic Expedition), and Philip Nell and Peter Marquis (British Antarctic Survey).

The feature is named after the settlement of Lesnovo in Western Bulgaria.

== Location ==
The hill is located at 69°24′52″S 70°54′11″W, which is 6.9 km southwest of Mount Sanderson, 19.3 km west-southwest of Mount Cupola, 6.23 km north of Serpent Nunatak, and 10.95 km east of the central height of Landers Peaks in Sofia University Mountains.

== Maps ==
- British Antarctic Territory. Scale 1:200000 topographic map. DOS 610 – W 69 70. Tolworth, UK, 1971
- Antarctic Digital Database (ADD). Scale 1:250000 topographic map of Antarctica. Scientific Committee on Antarctic Research (SCAR). Since 1993, regularly upgraded and updated
