= Nebush Nunatak =

Nunatak on Alexander Island, Antarctica

Location of Alexander Island in the Antarctic Peninsula region

Satellite image of Alexander Island

Nebush Nunatak (Bulgarian: нунатак Небуш, ‘Nunatak Nebush’ \'nu-na-tak 'ne-bush\) is the mostly ice-free rocky ridge extending 1.54 km in north-south direction and 1.1 km wide, rising to 913 m on the west side of Elgar Uplands in northern Alexander Island, Antarctica. It surmounts Nichols Snowfield to the west and its tributary Delius Glacier to the east. The vicinity was visited on 30 January 1988 by the geological survey team of Christo Pimpirev and Borislav Kamenov (First Bulgarian Antarctic Expedition), and Philip Nell and Peter Marquis (British Antarctic Survey).

British mapping in 1971. The feature is named after the megalithic monument of Nebush in Southwestern Bulgaria.

== Location ==
The ridge is located at 69°37′30″S 71°04′54″W, which is 8.6 km northwest of Kozhuh Peak, 11.8 km north of Appalachia Nunataks, 18 km northeast of Sutton Heights, 16.23 km east of Mount Balkanska in Lassus Mountains, 10.63 km southeast of Shaw Nunatak and 5 km south-southwest of Tegra Nunatak.

== Maps ==
- British Antarctic Territory. Scale 1:200000 topographic map. DOS 610 – W 69 70. Tolworth, UK, 1971
- Antarctic Digital Database (ADD). Scale 1:250000 topographic map of Antarctica. Scientific Committee on Antarctic Research (SCAR). Since 1993, regularly upgraded and updated
