= Stryama Peak =

Peak on Alexander Island, Antarctica

Location of Alexander Island in the Antarctic Peninsula region

Satellite image of Alexander Island

Stryama Peak (Bulgarian: връх Стряма, romanized: vrah Stryama, IPA: [ˈvrɤx ˈstrʲamɐ]) is the ice-covered peak rising to 2193 m on the west side of Rouen Mountains in northern Alexander Island, Antarctica. It surmounts Rosselin Glacier to the north-northwest. The peak's foothills were visited on 10 January 1988 by the geological survey team of Christo Pimpirev and Borislav Kamenov (First Bulgarian Antarctic Expedition), and Philip Nell and Peter Marquis (British Antarctic Survey).

The feature is named after the settlement of Stryama in Southern Bulgaria.

== Location ==
The peak is located at 69°18′45″S 70°50′10″W, which is 6.14 km southwest of Mount Sanderson, 5.67 km west-northwest of Mount Cupola, 17.9 km north-northeast of Serpent Nunatak, 18.52 km northeast of the central height of Landers Peaks in Sofia University Mountains, and 18.15 km east-southeast of Breze Peak in Havre Mountains.

== Maps ==
- British Antarctic Territory. Scale 1:200000 topographic map. DOS 610 – W 69 70. Tolworth, UK, 1971
- Antarctic Digital Database (ADD). Scale 1:250000 topographic map of Antarctica. Scientific Committee on Antarctic Research (SCAR). Since 1993, regularly upgraded and updated
