= Rachenitsa Nunatak =

Nunatak on Alexander Island, Antarctica

Location of Alexander Island in the Antarctic Peninsula region

Satellite image of Alexander Island

Rachenitsa Nunatak (Bulgarian: нунатак Ръченица, ‘Nunatak Rachenitsa’ \'nu-na-tak r&-che-'ni-tsa\) is the ridge 1.8 km long in south-north direction, with twin rocky heights extending 500 by 350 m with elevation 842 m, and 900 by 330 m with elevation 843 m respectively, situated in Nichols Snowfield, northern Alexander Island in Antarctica. The vicinity was visited on 2 February 1988 by the geological survey team of Christo Pimpirev and Borislav Kamenov (First Bulgarian Antarctic Expedition), and Philip Nell and Peter Marquis (British Antarctic Survey).

The feature is named after the Bulgarian folk dance Rachenitsa, in connection with the settlement of Rachenitsa in Southeastern Bulgaria.

== Location ==
The south height of the ridge is located at 69°35′24″S 71°15′45″W, which is 5.3 km south-southwest of Shaw Nunatak, 8.3 km west of Tegra Nunatak and 8.05 km northwest of Nebush Nunatak in Elgar Uplands, and 8.4 km east-northeast of Moriseni Peak in Lassus Mountains.

== Maps ==
- British Antarctic Territory. Scale 1:200000 topographic map. DOS 610 – W 69 70. Tolworth, UK, 1971
- Antarctic Digital Database (ADD). Scale 1:250000 topographic map of Antarctica. Scientific Committee on Antarctic Research (SCAR). Since 1993, regularly upgraded and updated
