= Moriseni Peak =

Peak on Alexander Island, Antarctica

Location of Alexander Island in the Antarctic Peninsula region

Satellite image of Alexander Island

Moriseni Peak (Bulgarian: връх Морисени, romanized: vrah Moriseni, IPA: [ˈvrɤx moriˈsɛni]) is the mostly ice-covered peak rising to 1740 m in Lassus Mountains, northern Alexander Island in Antarctica. It has steep and partly ice-free south slopes, and surmounts Nichols Snowfield to the east and Narechen Glacier to the northwest. British mapping in 1971. The feature is named after the ancient Thracian tribe of Moriseni inhabiting the Bulgarian Black Sea Coast.

== Location ==
The peak is located at 69°36′33″S 71°28′15″W, which is 2.7 km south by east of Mount Devol, 8.38 km west-southwest of Rachenitsa Nunatak, 2.53 km north-northeast of Mount Balkanska and 5.55 km east by north of Beagle Peak.

== Maps ==
- British Antarctic Territory. Scale 1:200000 topographic map. DOS 610 – W 69 70. Tolworth, UK, 1971
- Antarctic Digital Database (ADD). Scale 1:250000 topographic map of Antarctica. Scientific Committee on Antarctic Research (SCAR). Since 1993, regularly upgraded and updated
