= Mount Strauss =

Mountain on Alexander Island, Antarctica

Mount Strauss (71°39′S 73°12′W) is a snow-covered mountain, rising to about 815 m, with a steep scarp on the south side, 6 nautical miles (11 km) east-southeast of the head of Brahms Inlet in the southwest part of Alexander Island, Antarctica. A number of mountains in this general vicinity appear on the maps of the Ronne Antarctic Research Expedition in 1947–48. This mountain, apparently one of these, was mapped from RARE air photos by Searle of the Falkland Islands Dependencies Survey in 1960. Named by United Kingdom Antarctic Place-Names Committee after Johann Strauss I (1804–49) and Richard Strauss (1864–1949), German composers.

== See also ==
- Mount Bayonne
- Mount Tchaikovsky
- Mount Wilbye
