= Faulkner Nunatak =

Nunatak on Alexander Island, Antarctica

Location of Alexander Island in the Antarctic Peninsula region

Faulkner Nunatak (69°36′S 71°42′W) is a distinctive nunatak, about 200 metres (660 ft) high, just west of Beagle Peak and 9.5 km west by south of Mount Devol in the Lassus Mountains, in the northwest part of Alexander Island, Antarctica. The feature appears in U.S. Navy aerial photographs obtained in 1966. It was named by the Advisory Committee on Antarctic Names after Harold T. Faulkner, U.S. Navy, Leading Chief of Squadron VXE-6 Photo Division on Operation Deep Freeze, 1969.

== See also ==
- Caninus Nunatak
- Geode Nunataks
- Shaw Nunatak
