= Javier Cacho Gomez =

Javier Cacho
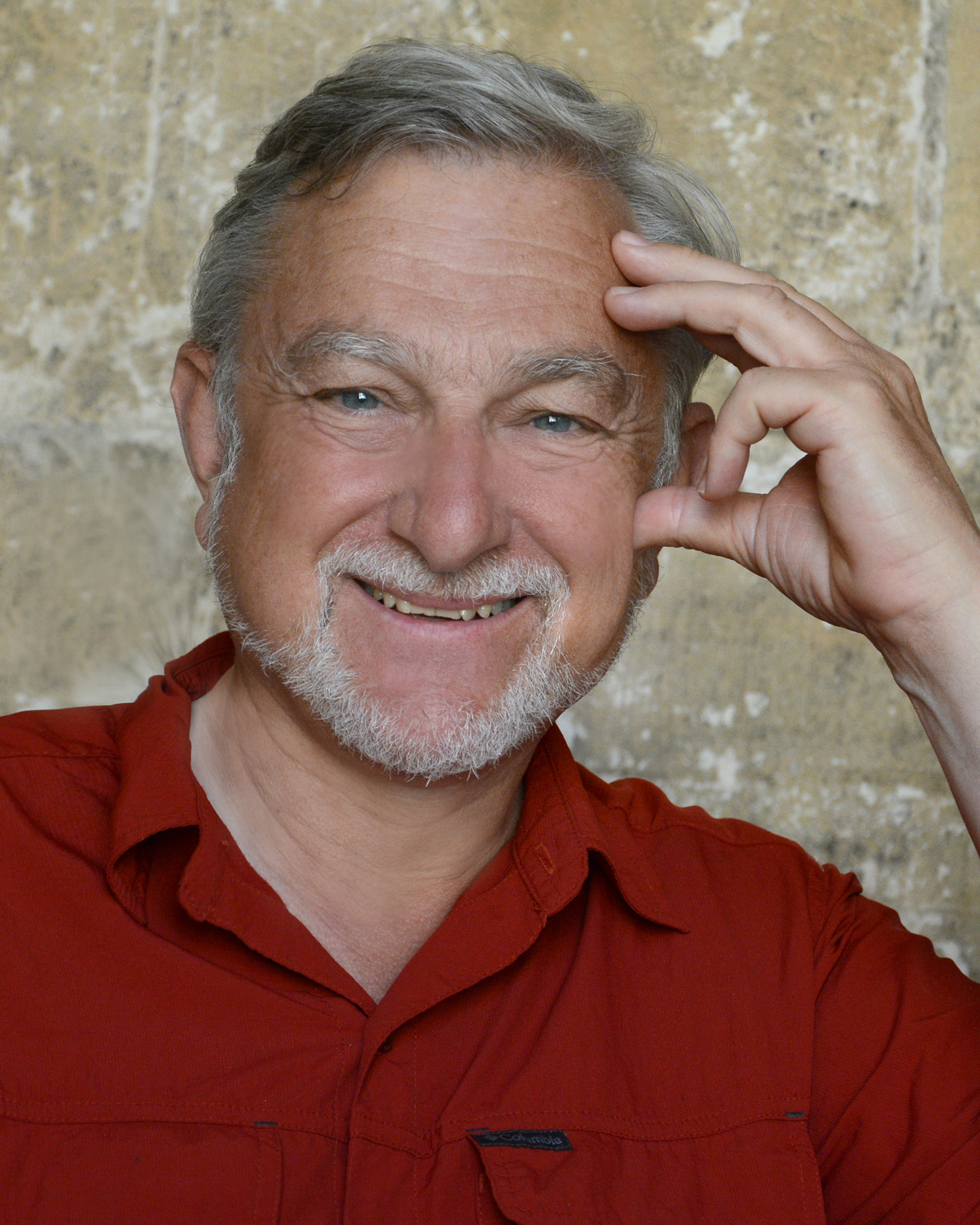
- Born: 19 December 1952; Madrid
- Occupations: writer, scientist, physicist and disseminator
- Writing career
- Language: Spanish
- Website: www.javiercacho.com

Javier Cacho (born 19 December 1952) is a Spanish writer, scientist, physicist and disseminator.

== Scientific activities ==
He started his scientific work at the National Investigation Commission for Space (CONIE). In the 80's he carried out investigations relating to the study of the Ozone Layer, on which he wrote a book, Antarctic: The Ozone Hole (1989).

He has been responsible for the laboratory studies of the atmosphere at the National Institute for Aerospace Technology (INTA) till 2016.

In 1986, he was a member of the first Spanish Scientific Expedition to the Antarctic, where he returned the following years -one of the years in the middle of winter-, to continue the investigations relating to the destruction of the Ozone Layer at those latitudes. He participated in various campaigns of investigation as Head of the Juan Carlos I Antarctic Base.

For a few years, he has collaborated with the Interdepartmental Commission for Science and technology (CICYT), and in the Spanish Antarctic Program, Secretary of the Spanish National Investigation Committee for the Antarctic, and alternating Delegate of the Scientific Committee on Antarctic Research. His disseminating character has taken him to collaborate with different means of communication. Always relating to subjects related to the Antarctic science and its environment.

== Literary work and dissemination ==
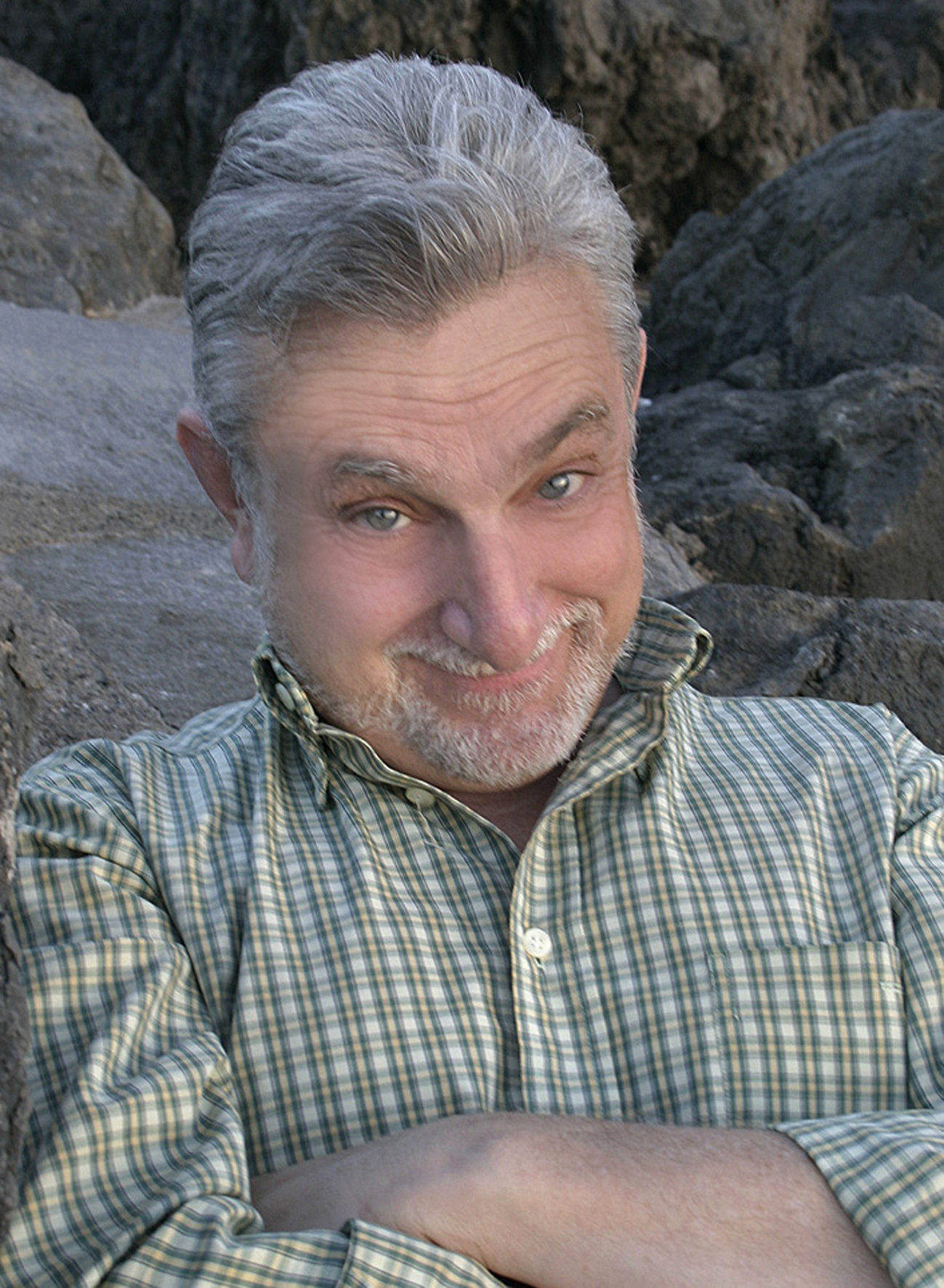

Since the beginning of his scientific career, he has shown a clear tendency of being able to disseminate the scientific knowledge in the society, which has taken him to exert as a scientific collaborator of SALVAT publishers, for different encyclopedias concerning scientific terms.

The appearance of the Ozone hole made him, not only participate in different campaigns of investigation, but also to write a book “Antarctic: The Ozone hole”. It was the first book written in Spanish concerning this subject, and the second to have been written in the world.

Precisely, the social impact that such mysterious phenomenon, had pushed him to multiply his activity in the field of scientific dissemination, in particular Ecology, being Coordinator/Editor of various books belonging to the Environment collection – FIAT, collaborator with the magazine “Estratos”, member of the Editorial Board and the Editing Committee of the publication” Scientific and Social Tendencies”, head of the Ecology section of the magazine ”Planetary Conscience”, Head-editor of the News Service for the platform Internet - Geoscopio, specialized in environmental subjects, and columnist for the Bolivian newspaper “La Prensa”.

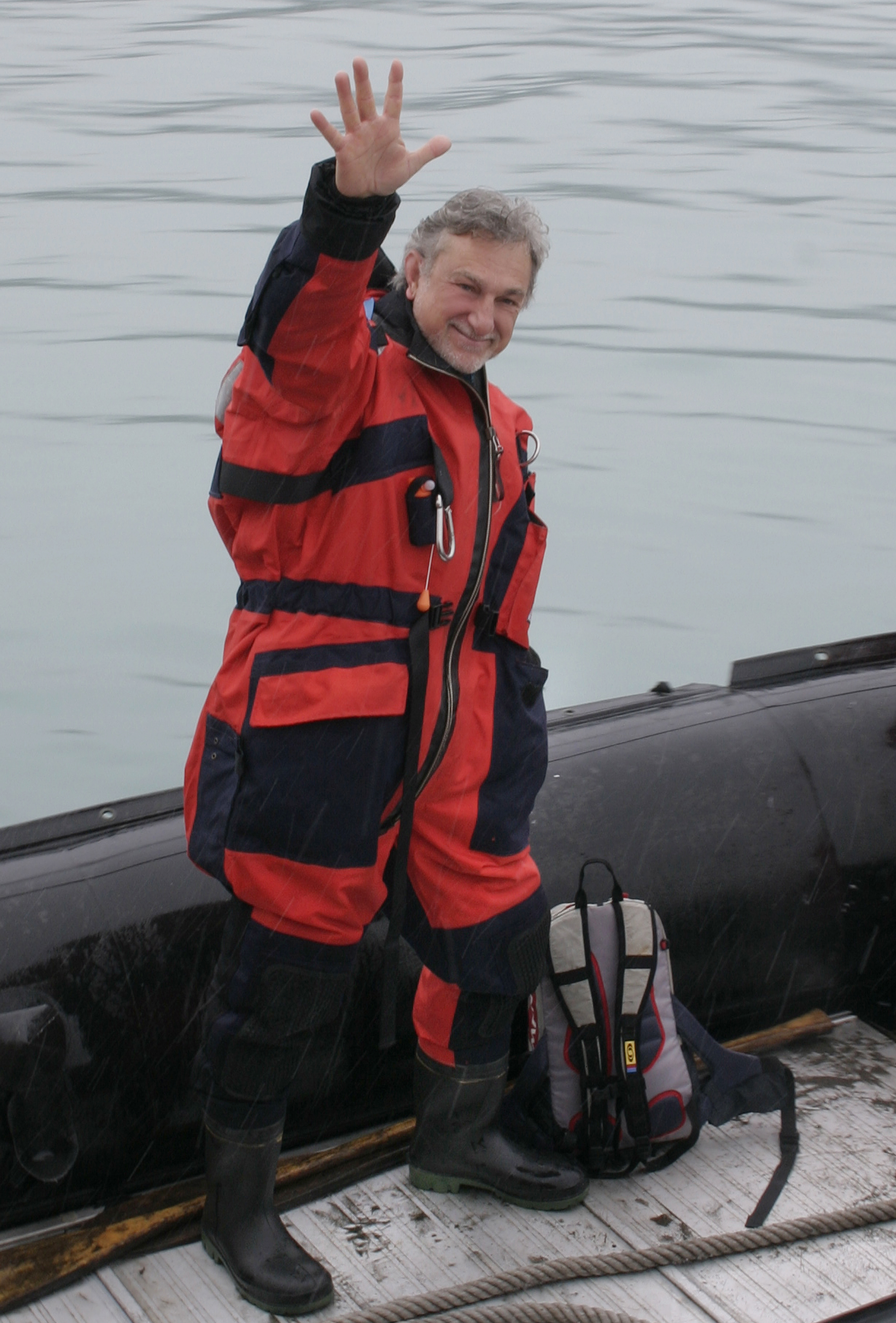
Javier Cacho in Antarctic as a base commander of the Spanish Antarctic Base "Juan Carlos I"

Since his first visit to the Antarctic, his interest in the history of the exploration of the continent, and the result of years of study, has taken him to write a book” Amundsen-Scott: Duel in the Antarctic”(Forcola 2011), preface by Manuel Toharia and subsequently translated into Bulgarian language, and published by the publisher Ciela, preface by Christo Pimpirev.

Equally, his literary activity is concentrated on Antarctic themes. Having written a collection of Antarctic stories, and a narrative-fiction book ”The adventures of Piti in the Antarctic” (2001 Publications Tao) and subsequently published by the Sofia University. His last books are: "Shackleton, el indomable" (Madrid, 2013), "Nansen, maestro de la exploración polar" (Madrid, 2017) and "Yo, el Fram" (Madrid, 2018). Also as a lecturer he has concentrated on the Polar subjects, developing an intense activity among the students.

== Publications ==
=== Books ===
- Antarctic: The Ozone hole (Madrid, 1989)
- The adventures of Piti in the Antarctic (Madrid, 2001)
- The adventures of Piti in the Antarctic (Sofia, Bulgaria, 2008,2021)
- Amundsen-Scott: Duel in the Antarctic (Madrid, 2011),
- Amundsen-Scott: Duel in the Antarctic (Sofia, Bulgaria, 2011)
- Shackleton, el indomable (Madrid, 2013)
- Nansen, maestro de la exploración polar (Madrid, 2017)
- Yo, el Fram (Madrid, 2018)
- Héroes de la Antártida (Madrid, 2019)
- Nansen, maestro de la exploración polar (Sofia, Bulgaria, 2020)
- Antarctic Cuisine (Sofia, Bulgaria, 2021) with Christo Pimpirev and Iglika Trifonova
- Shackleton, el indomable (Sofia, Bulgaria, 2022)

=== Articles ===
- «Cuando los exploradores pierden la ilusión» - La linea del horizonte, 5 June 2012.
- «Antártida. Más difícil todavía» - La linea del horizonte, 8 October 2012.
- «¿Quién es el español más viajero?» - La linea del horizonte, 27 July 2012.
- «Siete minutos de angustia» - La linea del horizonte, 2 August 2012.
- «¿Por qué una isla de la antártida se llama Javier Cacho? - National geographic, 15 June 2020

=== Interviews ===
- "Yo, el Fram" - interview in "La hora Cervantes", RTVE, 15 November 2018.
- «La carrera por la conquista de la Antártida» - entrevista en "La noche en vela", RNE, 13 February 2013.
- «Amundsen siempre quiso ser explorador, no famoso» - entrevista de J.Giles a Javier Cacho Gómez, ABC, 22 January 2013.
- «Largo viaje hacia el frío» - entrevista en "Informe Semanal", RTVE, 25 March 2012.
- «Escrito en la Antártida» - entrevista de Alejandro Togores a Javier Cacho, Aica TV, 2011.
- «Hasta el 2050 la capa de ozono no estará en condiciones normales» - entrevista de Carmen Serrano a Javier Cacho Gómez, Heraldo de Aragón, 23 November 2010.
- «La reaparición del agujero de ozono era esperada, según científicos españoles en la Antártida» - entrevista de Pura C. Roy a Javier Cacho Gómez, El País, 27 September 1989.

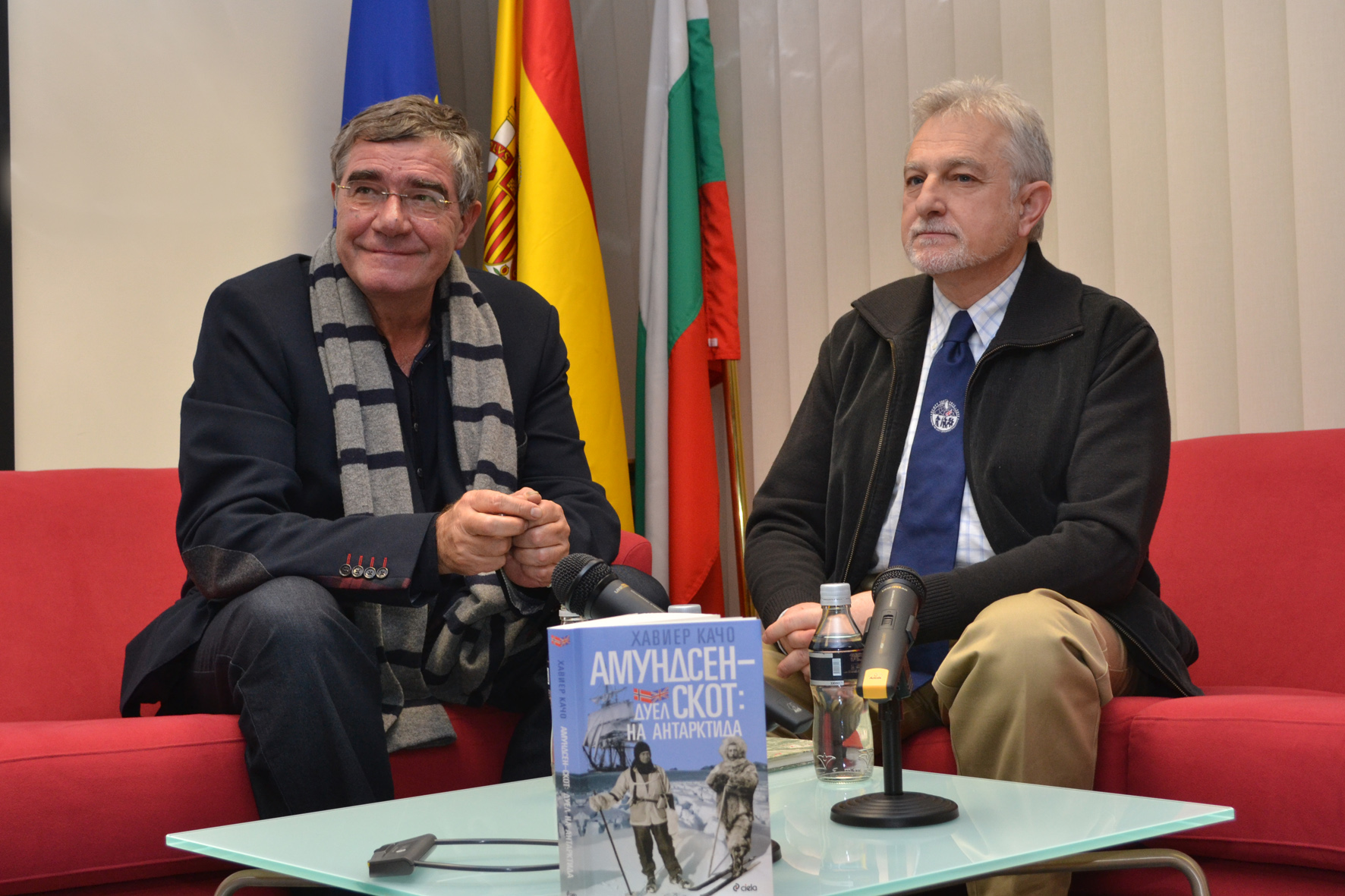
Javier Cacho and prof. Christo Pimpirev during the presentation of the book "Amundsen-Scott" in Institute Cervantes - Sofía, 5 December 2012
