= Lizard Nunatak =

Location of Alexander Island in the Antarctic Peninsula region

Lizard Nunatak (69°30′S 71°3′W) is a nunatak rising to about 800 metres (2,600 ft) situated within the Nichols Snowfield, in the northern portion of Alexander Island, Antarctica. It is situated 12 km east by north of Mount Kliment Ohridski and 9 km south-southeast of the summit of Landers Peaks in Sofia University Mountains, and 6.4 km southwest of Serpent Nunatak and 9.38 km north by west of Tegra Nunatak in Rouen Mountains. The feature was so named by the UK Antarctic Place-Names Committee in 1977 from its shape and in association with Serpent Nunatak lying to the northeast.

== See also ==
- Admirals Nunatak
- Gannon Nunataks
- Knott Nunatak
