= Emanuil Vaskidovich =

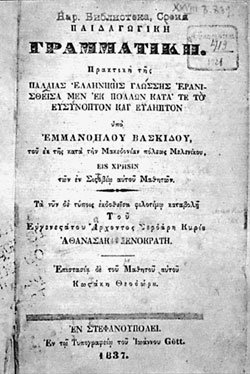
Ancient Greek grammar by Emanuil Vaskidovich

Emanuil Vaskidovich (Bulgarian: Емануил Васкидович; 1795 – 30 September 1875) was a Bulgarian National Revival educator, the founder of the first secular school in the Bulgarian lands.

Vaskidovich was born under the name Manolaki Vaskidi in the city of Melnik and he was of Greek origin. He studied at the Greek school in his hometown and at the Greek high school on Chios island. Vaskidovich finished the Bey's Academy in Bucharest. In 1815, he founded the first Hellenic-Bulgarian school in the Bulgarian lands in the Danubian town of Svishtov. He later organized the first school library in Bulgaria, to which he left his 800 volumes of literature. In 1832, Vaskidovich introduced the Bell-Lancaster method to the Svishtov school, where grammar, arithmetic and geography were taught. Until 1845, he was the head teacher of Svishtov; in that year, he was expelled under the pressure of the Grecoman party in the town only to return to his post between 1854 and 1863. In the interim, he worked as a teacher in Pleven.

Vaskidovich aided Neofit Bozveli in his publishing of the pedagogical book Slavenobolgarskoe Detevodstvo in 1835. He was the author of 15 textbooks and books, as well as grammar of the Ancient Greek language. He was also an active public figure, representing the Svishtov municipality in Wallachia, Constantinople and Vienna.

== Honours ==
Vaskidovich Ridge in Antarctica is named after Emanuil Vaskidovich.
