= Frank Thompson (SOE officer) =

British Army officer

- Major William Frank Thompson of SOE
- Born: William Frank Thompson; 17 August 1920; Darjeeling, British India
- Died: 10 June 1944 (aged 23); Litakovo, Kingdom of Bulgaria
- Burial place: Sofia War Cemetery
- Relatives: E. P. Thompson (brother)
- Military career
- Allegiance: United Kingdom
- Branch: British Army
- Service years: 1939–1944
- Rank: Major
- Unit: Special Operations Executive
- Conflicts: Second World War †

Major William Frank Thompson (17 August 1920 – 10 June 1944) was a British officer who acted as a liaison between the British Army and the Bulgarian communist partisans during the Second World War.

== Early life, family and education ==
Thompson was born in Darjeeling, Bengal Presidency, British India to a British missionary family. He was educated at Winchester College and New College, Oxford. Freeman Dyson, a fellow pupil at Winchester, has described Thompson's extraordinary facility with diverse languages and that "Frank was the largest, the loudest, the most uninhibited and the most brilliant." Dyson "learned from him more than I learned from anybody else at the school".

His younger brother, E.P. Thompson, was an English historian, socialist and peace campaigner.

== Second World War ==
In 1939, while studying at the University of Oxford, he became a member of the Communist Party of Great Britain under the influence of his close friend Iris Murdoch. Despite his affiliation, he did not support the party's policy of neutrality dictated by the Molotov–Ribbentrop Pact and joined the British Army with service number 124039 as a volunteer training with the No. 122 Officer Cadet Training Regiment before being commissioned Second Lieutenant into the Royal Artillery on 2 March 1940. He served in England, North Africa, Syria, Iraq, Sicily, Serbia and Bulgaria. He was part of the Special Operations Executive.

On 25 January 1944, along with three other commandos, Major Thompson was sent on a parachute landing mission to establish a link between the British staff and the Bulgarian partisans led by Slavcho Transki; he landed near Dobro Pole, Macedonia. The commandos carried a radio to keep in contact with the staff in Cairo, Egypt and Bari, Italy, but it broke down. On 23 May, Thompson took part in the clash at the village of Batulia between the Bulgarian Gendarmerie and the Second Sofia Brigade of National Liberation of the partisans. He was wounded by the gendarmerie forces, captured and, after a defiant speech in Bulgarian at his show trial, was executed by firing squad in the nearby village of Litakovo (Bulgarian: bg: Литаково).

== Post War ==
After the war and the establishment of a Communist government in Bulgaria, the nearby villages of Livage, Lipata, Tsarevi Stragi, Malak Babul, Babul and Zavoya were merged and renamed to Thompson (Томпсън) in the British officer's honour. Similarly, the railway station at Prokopnik, the site of a fierce battle, became "Major Thompson Station". Thompson Hill in Antarctica is also named after Frank Thompson.

== Biographies ==
E.P. Thompson wrote two books about his brother, the first with his mother, There is a Spirit in Europe: A Memoir of Frank Thompson. This 1947 out of print publication was re-released in 2024 by Brittunculi Records & Books. The second, Beyond the Frontier: the Politics of a Failed Mission, Bulgaria 1944, appeared in 1996.
