= Talaskara Ridge =

Location of Alexander Island in the Antarctic Peninsula region

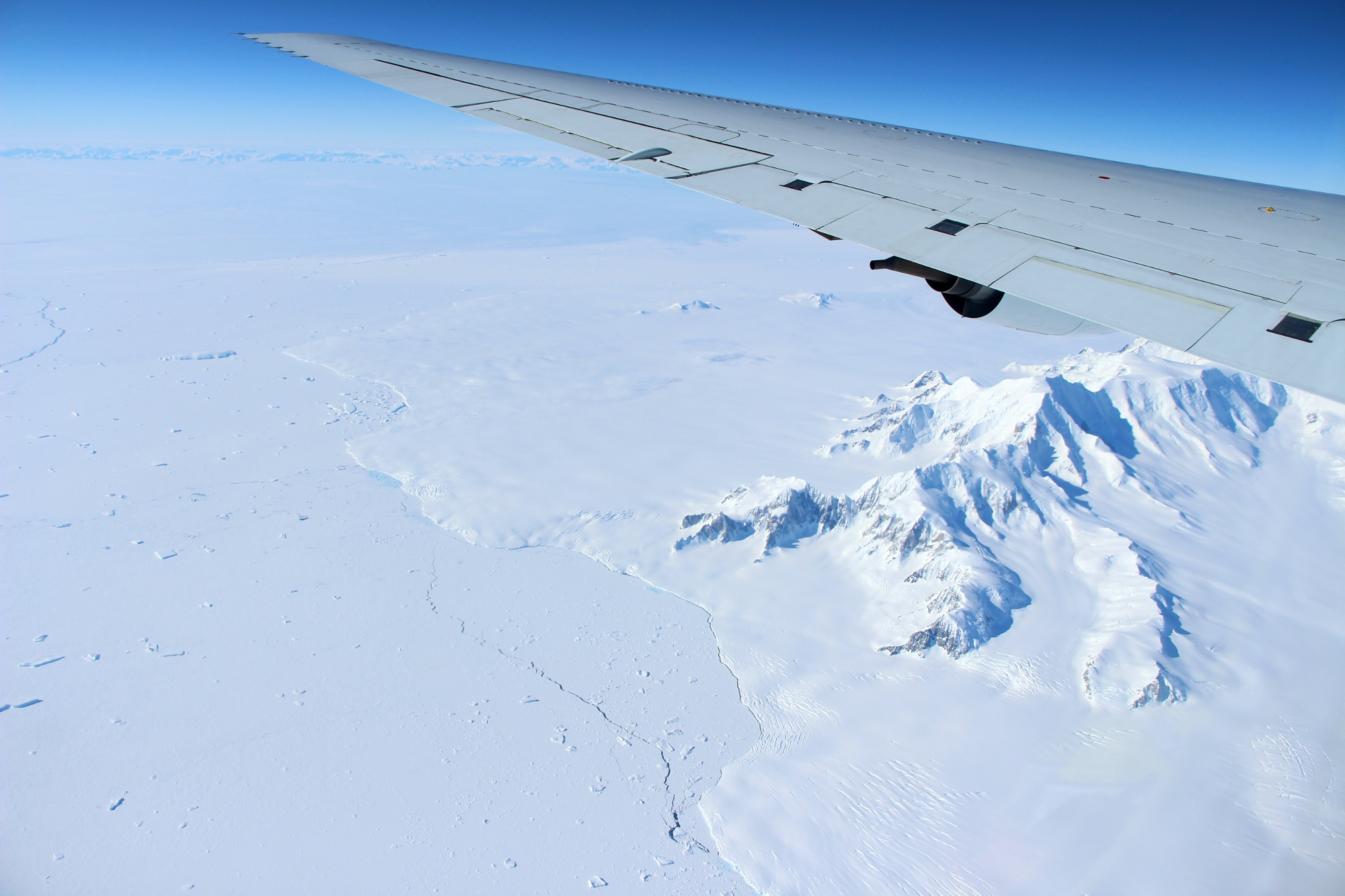
The north extremity of Alexander Island with Skaidava Bay in the centre and Rouen Mountains on the right; Talaskara is the nearest offshoot on the right

Talaskara Ridge (Bulgarian: рид Таласкара, ‘Rid Talaskara’ \'rid ta-la-'ska-ra\) is the ice-covered ridge extending 7.5 km in southeast–northwest direction and 1.8 km wide, rising to 1122 m (central height) and 1201 m (south height) on the northwest side of Rouen Mountains in northern Alexander Island, Antarctica. It surmounts Bongrain Ice Piedmont to the west and southwest. The vicinity was visited on 6 January 1988 by the geological survey party of Christo Pimpirev and Borislav Kamenov (First Bulgarian Antarctic Expedition), and Philip Nell and Peter Marquis (British Antarctic Survey).

The feature is named after the ancient Thracian fortress of Talaskara in Southeastern Bulgaria.

== Location ==
The central summit of the ridge is located at 68°56′21.5″S 71°04′53″W. It lies approximately 30.9 km southwest of the northeastern tip of the island, Cape Arauco; 5.77 km west-southwest of Mount Bayonne; 9.4 km northwest of Mount Paris; and 29.95 km northeast of Mount Newman in the Havre Mountains.

== Maps ==
- British Antarctic Territory. Scale 1:250000 topographic map. Sheet SR19-20/5. APC UK, 1991
- Antarctic Digital Database (ADD). Scale 1:250000 topographic map of Antarctica. Scientific Committee on Antarctic Research (SCAR). Since 1993, regularly upgraded and updated
