= Iglika Trifonova (photographer) =

Bulgarian photographer

Iglika Trifonova (Bulgarian: Иглика Трифонова) is a Bulgarian photographer and author. As of 2025, she took part in six Bulgarian expeditions to Antarctica.

She was founding chair of the Bulgarian section of the Association of Polar Early Career Scientists (2011-2023)

She is member of the Union of Bulgarian Publicists and the Bulgarian Antarctic Institute.

In 2022, she was included in the international ranking of 100 women in polar science and education.

In 2023, the Trifonova Point, a headland on the Livingston Island was named after her.

As an educator, she gives lectures ad seminars at various events.

== Books ==
- 2020: Антарктическа кухня (with Javier Cacho Gomez and Christo Pimpirev)
  - 2021:English translation: Antarctic Cuisine (ISBN 9789542724988)
  - Culinary history of Antarctic expeditions and the experience of 36 chefs from 29 countries with over 60 recipes and trade secrets for Antarctic cuisine.
- 2022: Антарктическият стопаджия (with Christo Pimpirev;
  - 2023: English translation: The Antarctic Hitchhiker (ISBN 9786191953332)
- 2025: Антарктида – история, природа, българските полярници (with Christo Pimpirev)
  A popular science encyclopedic book about Antarctica. Its part is a description of Antarctica, The second part is about the discovery and exploration of Antarctica; it also includes art and music in the world of Antarctica, as well as popular legends and myths. The third part is about the Bulgarians in Antarctica.
