= Tegra Nunatak =

Rocky ridge in antarctica

Location of Alexander Island in the Antarctic Peninsula region

Satellite image of Alexander Island

Tegra Nunatak (Bulgarian: нунатак Тегра, ‘Nunatak Tegra’ \'nu-na-tak 'te-gra\) is the mostly ice-free rocky ridge extending 2.6 km in east–west direction and 700 m wide, rising to 1075 m at the west extremity of Elgar Uplands in northern Alexander Island, Antarctica. It surmounts Delius Glacier to the southeast and Nichols Snowfield to the north and west. The nunatak was visited on 30 January 1988 by the geological survey team of Christo Pimpirev and Borislav Kamenov (First Bulgarian Antarctic Expedition), and Philip Nell and Peter Marquis (British Antarctic Survey).

The feature is named after the ancient Roman fortress of Tegra in Northeastern Bulgaria.

== Location ==
The ridge is located at 69°34′53″S 71°02′54″W, which is 5 km north-northeast of Nebush Nunatak, 8.1 km southeast of Shaw Nunatak and 9.38 km south by east of Lizard Nunatak.

== Maps ==
- British Antarctic Territory. Scale 1:200000 topographic map. DOS 610 – W 69 70. Tolworth, UK, 1971
- Antarctic Digital Database (ADD). Scale 1:250000 topographic map of Antarctica. Scientific Committee on Antarctic Research (SCAR). Since 1993, regularly upgraded and updated
