= Valchev Cove =

Cove in Antarctica

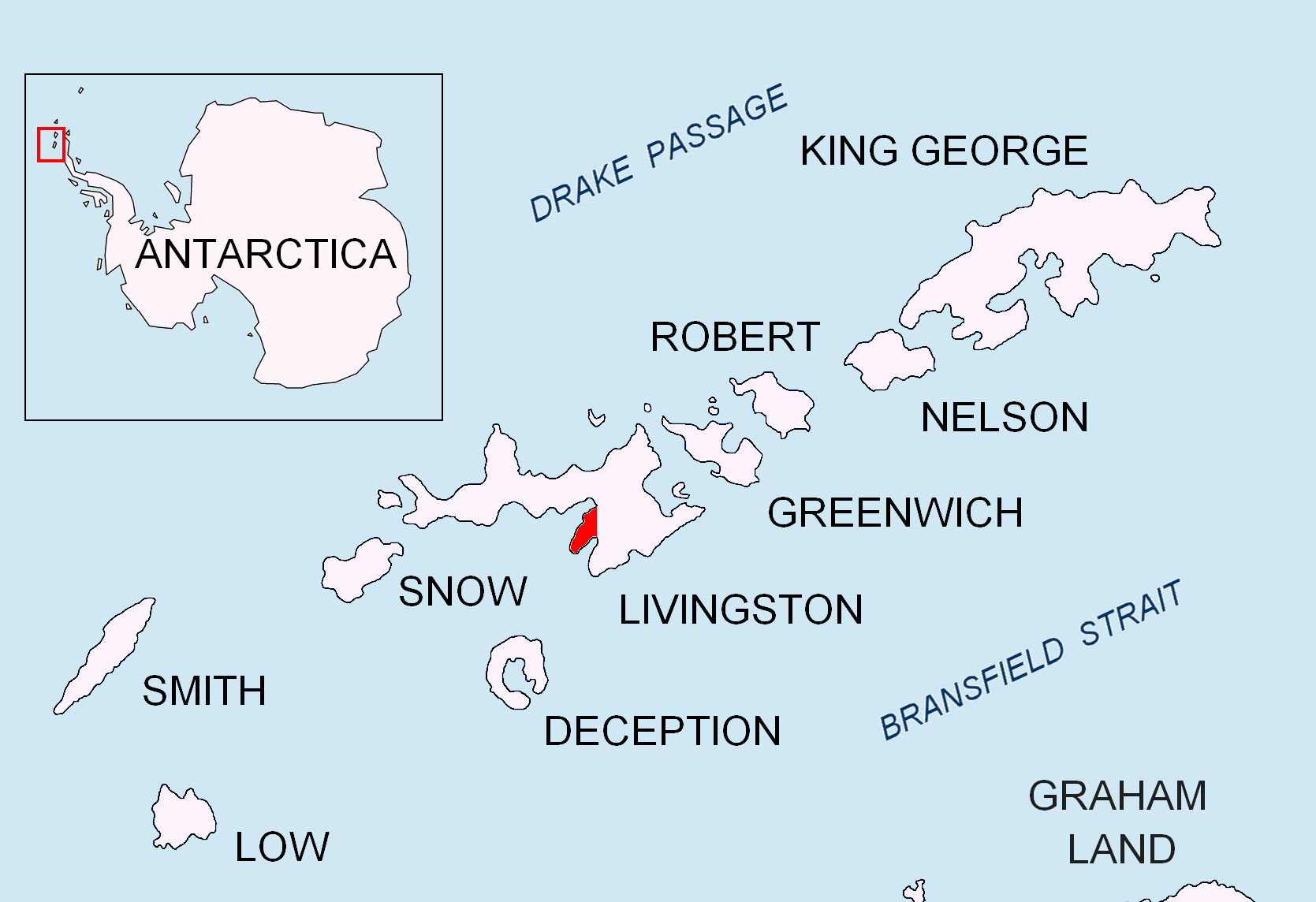
Location of Hurd Peninsula on Livingston Island in the South Shetland Islands

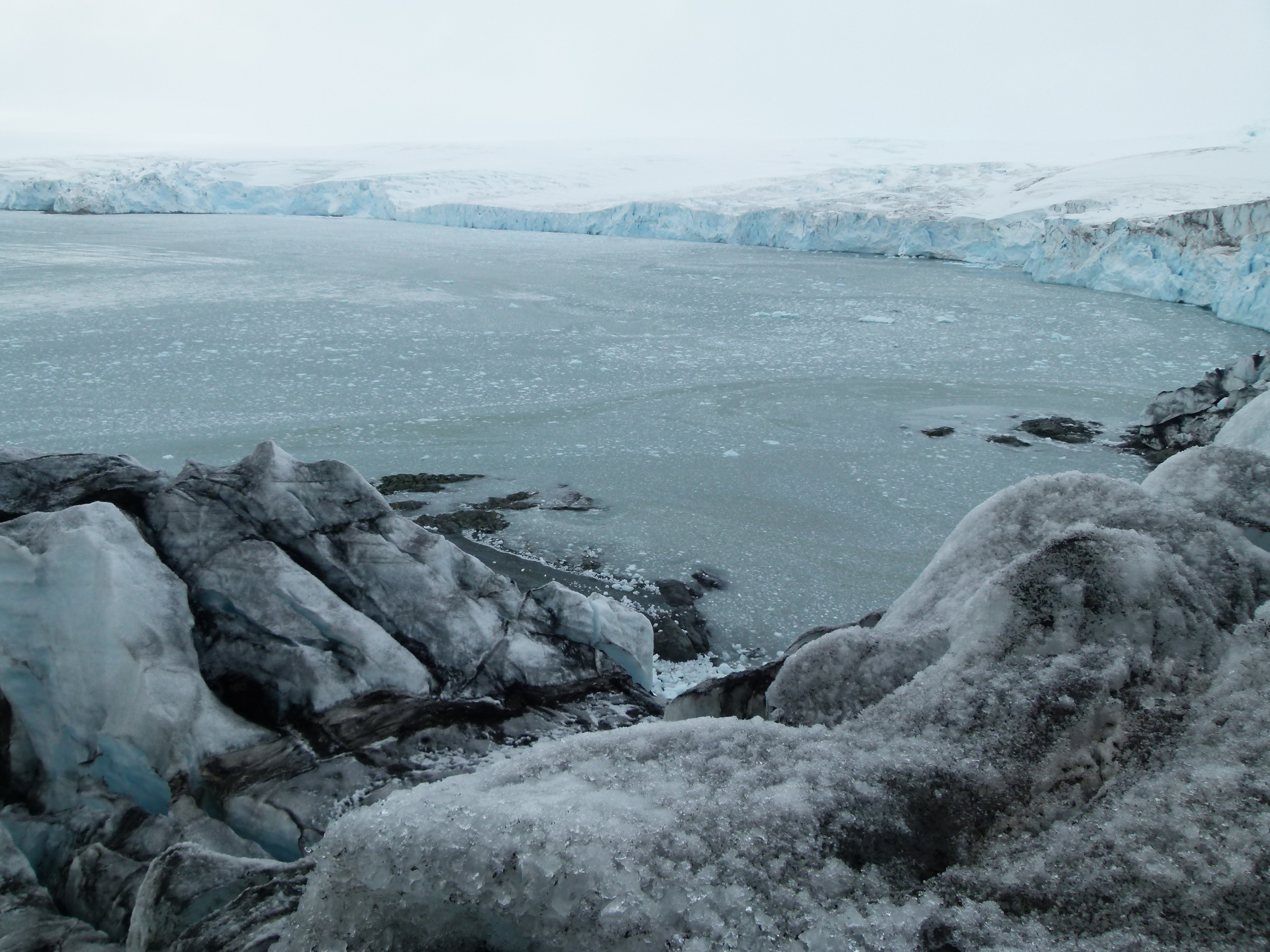
The entrance of Valchev Cove from Perunika Glacier with Trifonova Point on the left and Emona Anchorage in the background

Topographic map of Livingston Island and Smith Island

Valchev Cove (Bulgarian: Вълчев залив, romanized: Valchev zaliv, IPA: [ˈvɤlt͡ʃev ˈzalif]) is the 180 m wide cove indenting for 220 m the northwest coast of Hurd Peninsula on Livingston Island in Antarctica. It is part of Emona Anchorage entered east of Trifonova Point, the northeast extremity of Bulgarian Beach. Formed as a result of the retreat of Perunika Glacier at the beginning of 21st century.

The feature is named after the journalist and lawyer Kiril Valchev, director general of the Bulgarian News Agency, participant in the Bulgarian Antarctic expeditions in the 2004/05 and 2019/20 seasons, for his particularly significant contribution to the promotion of Antarctica, and for his assistance in the acquisition of the polar research ship Sts. Cyril and Methodius by the Nikola Vaptsarov Naval Academy and the Bulgarian Antarctic Institute.

== Location ==
The point is located at 62°38′01.5″S 60°20′05.8″W, which is 2.34 km east-northeast of Hespérides Point. Detailed mapping by the Military Geographic Service of the Bulgarian Army in 2016.

== Maps ==
- L. Ivanov. Antarctica: Livingston Island and Greenwich, Robert, Snow and Smith Islands. Scale 1:120000 topographic map. Troyan: Manfred Wörner Foundation, 2010. ISBN 978-954-92032-9-5 (First edition 2009. ISBN 978-954-92032-6-4)
- Bulgarian Base (Sheet 1 and Sheet 2): Antarctica, South Shetland Islands, Livingston Island. Scale 1:2000 topographic map. Sofia: Military Geographic Service, 2016. (in Bulgarian, map images on slides 6 and 7 of the linked report)
- Antarctic Digital Database (ADD). Scale 1:250000 topographic map of Antarctica. Scientific Committee on Antarctic Research (SCAR). Since 1993, regularly upgraded and updated.
- L. Ivanov. Antarctica: Livingston Island and Smith Island. Scale 1:100000 topographic map. Manfred Wörner Foundation, 2017. ISBN 978-619-90008-3-0
- I. Howat et al. The Reference Elevation Model of Antarctica – Mosaics, Version 2, 2022. https://doi.org/10.7910/DVN/EBW8UC, Harvard Dataverse, V1, [6 January 2023]
