= Trifonova Point =

Headland of the Livingston Island in Antarctica

Coordinates: 62°37′58.5″S 60°20′11.2″W

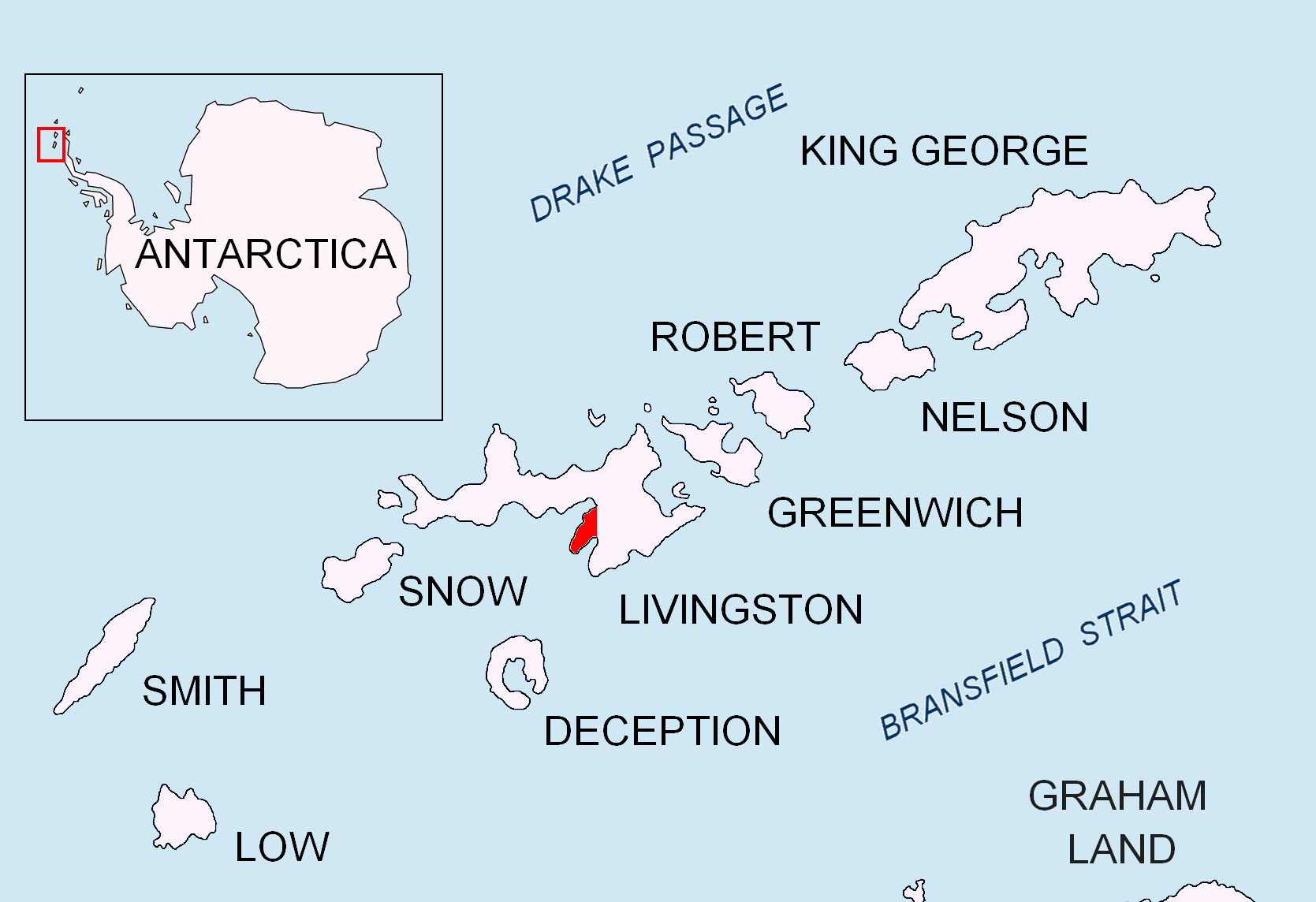
Location of Hurd Peninsula on Livingston Island in the South Shetland Islands

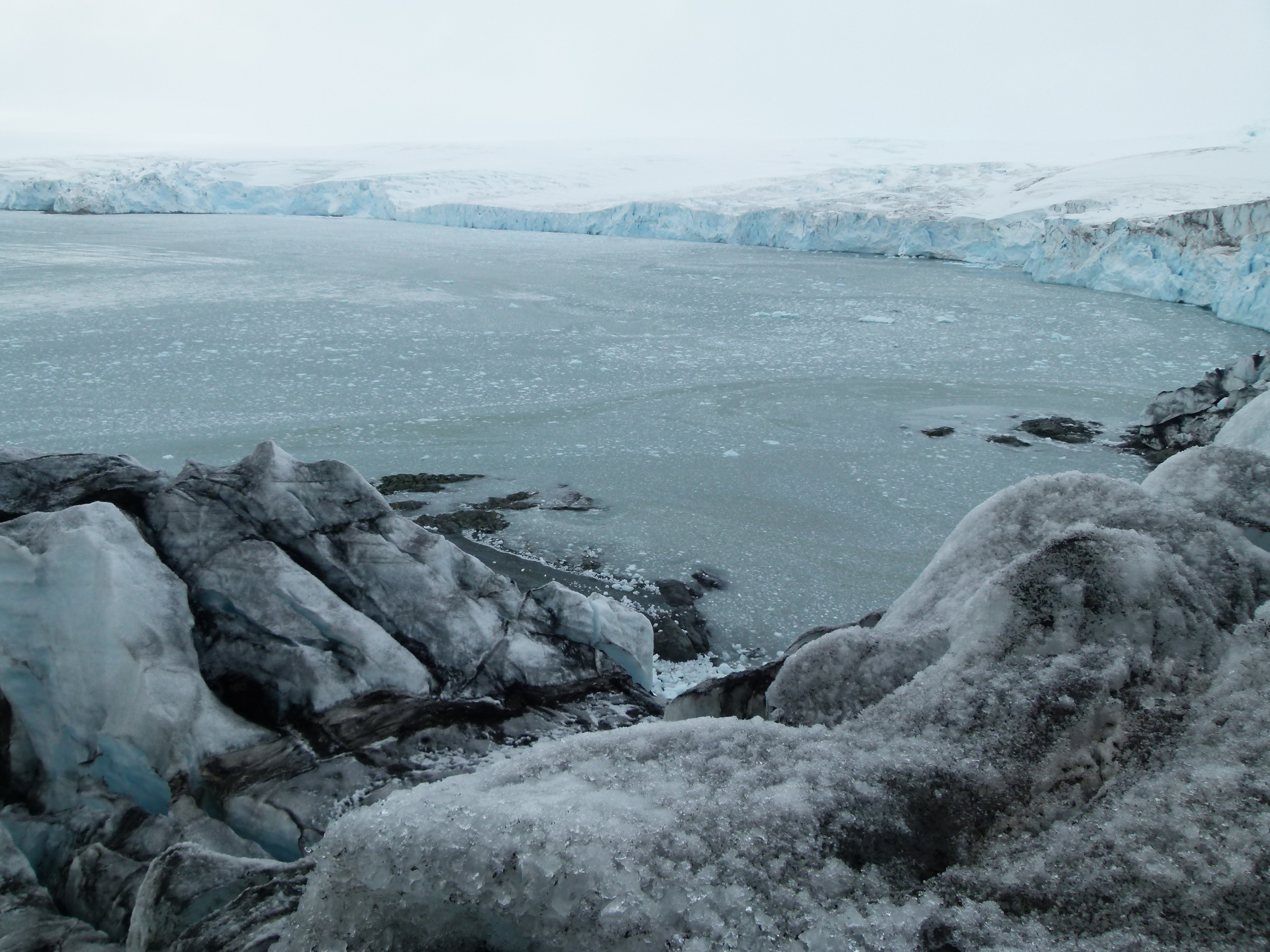
The entrance of Valchev Cove from Perunika Glacier with Trifonova Point on the left and Emona Anchorage in the background

Topographic map of Livingston Island and Smith Island

Trifonova Point (Bulgarian: нос Трифонова, romanized: nos Trifonova, IPA: [ˈnɔs ˈtrifonovɐ]) is the sharp ice-free tipped west entrance point of Valchev Cove on the northwest coast of Hurd Peninsula, projecting 160 m into Emona Anchorage and forming the northeast extremity of Bulgarian Beach on Livingston Island in Antarctica. Formed as a result of the retreat of Perunika Glacier at the beginning of 21st century.

The feature is named after the Bulgarian photographer, Iglika Trifonova, a participant in several Bulgarian Antarctic expeditions.

== Maps ==
- L. Ivanov. Antarctica: Livingston Island and Greenwich, Robert, Snow and Smith Islands. Scale 1:120000 topographic map. Troyan: Manfred Wörner Foundation, 2010. ISBN 978-954-92032-9-5 (First edition 2009. ISBN 978-954-92032-6-4)
- Bulgarian Base (Sheet 1 and Sheet 2): Antarctica, South Shetland Islands, Livingston Island. Scale 1:2000 topographic map. Sofia: Military Geographic Service, 2016. (in Bulgarian, map images on slides 6 and 7 of the linked report)
- Antarctic Digital Database (ADD). Scale 1:250000 topographic map of Antarctica. Scientific Committee on Antarctic Research (SCAR). Since 1993, regularly upgraded and updated.
- L. Ivanov. Antarctica: Livingston Island and Smith Island. Scale 1:100000 topographic map. Manfred Wörner Foundation, 2017. ISBN 978-619-90008-3-0
- I. Howat et al. The Reference Elevation Model of Antarctica – Mosaics, Version 2, 2022. https://doi.org/10.7910/DVN/EBW8UC, Harvard Dataverse, V1, [6 January 2023]
