= Narechen Glacier =

Glacier in Antarctica

Location of Alexander Island in the Antarctic Peninsula region. Narechen Glacier would be located in the northwest corner of Alexander Island in this image.

Narechen Glacier (Bulgarian: ледник Наречен, romanized: lednik Narechen, IPA: [ˈlɛdnik nɐˈrɛt͡ʃɛn]) is the 9 km long and 11 km wide glacier draining the western slopes of the Lassus Mountains on the northwest coast of Alexander Island in Antarctica. Flowing westwards to enter Lazarev Bay in the Wilkins Sound, Bellingshausen Sea. The glacier is situated south of the southwestern ridge of Mount Wilbye and north of Faulkner Nunatak, at 69°34′30″S 71°40′20″W. British mapping in 1963.

The glacier is named after the settlement and spa resort of Narechen in southern Bulgaria.

== See also ==
- Lennon Glacier
- Palestrina Glacier
- Wubbold Glacier

== Maps ==
- British Antarctic Territory. Scale 1:200000 topographic map No. 3127. DOS 610 - W 69 70. Tolworth, UK, 1971.
- Antarctic Digital Database (ADD). Scale 1:250000 topographic map of Antarctica. Scientific Committee on Antarctic Research (SCAR), 1993–2016.
