= Thompson, Bulgaria =

Village in Svoge municipality, Sofia oblast, Bulgaria

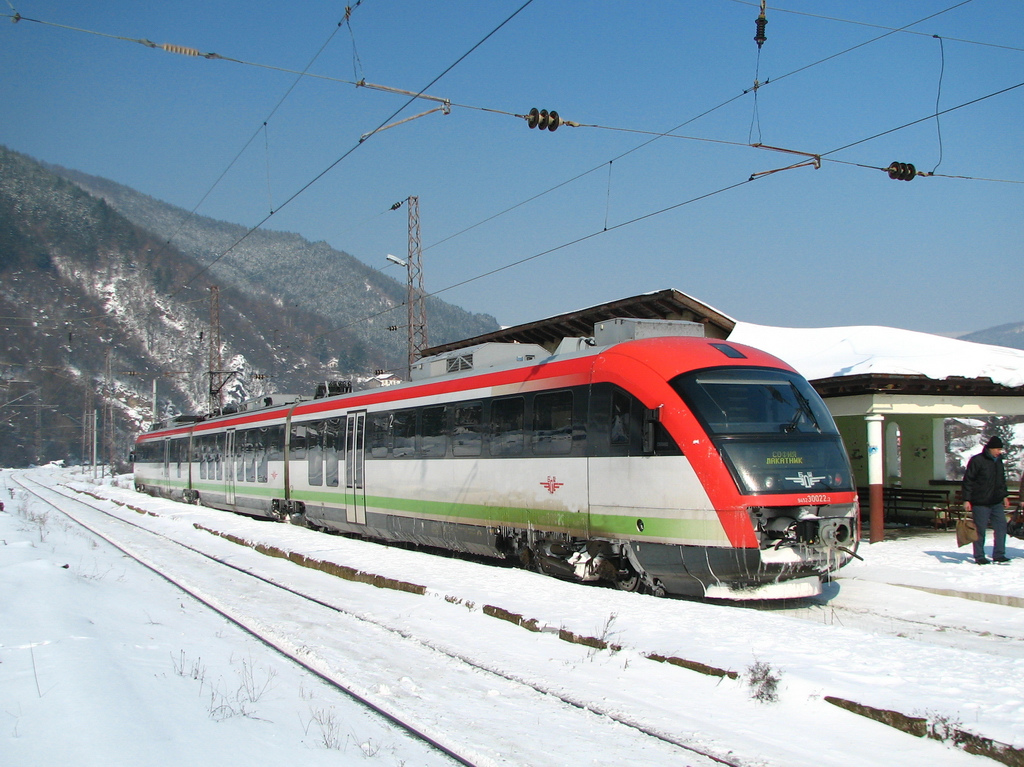
A Bulgarian State Railways train at Thompson railway station

Thompson (Bulgarian: Томпсън [ˈtɔmpsɐn]; also transliterated Tompsan, Tompsun, Tompsǎn or Tompson) is a village in central western Bulgaria, part of Svoge municipality, Sofia Province. As of 2008, it has a population of 838 and the mayor is Kiril Tsvetanov. Thompson lies at 42°56′N 23°23′E, 729 metres above mean sea level.

The village lies in the scenic Iskar Gorge of the western Balkan Mountains. It is a railway station on the Bulgarian State Railways' Sofia-Mezdra railway line. It was founded shortly after World War II through the merger of the neighbouring villages of Livage, Lipata, Tsarevi Stragi, Malak Babul, Babul and Zavoya. The village was named after British officer William Frank Thompson (1920–1944), who served as liaison officer between the British Army and the Bulgarian communist partisans during the war, who was captured by the Bulgarian Gendarmerie and executed in nearby Litakovo on 10 June 1944.

The village has two monuments to Major Thompson, one unveiled on 13 May 2007 in front of the mayor's office (see photo) that uses natural light to project Thompson's image over a plaque, and one at the railway station.
