= Beagle Peak =

Peak on Alexander Island, Antarctica

- Location within Antarctica

Highest point
- Elevation: 700 m (2,300 ft)
- Coordinates: 69°37′S 71°36′W

Geography
- Location: Alexander Island, Antarctica
- Parent range: Lassus Mountains

Beagle Peak (69°37′S 71°36′W) is a peak rising to about 700 metres (2,300 ft) in the central part of the Lassus Mountains, Alexander Island, Antarctica. It is situated 5.55 km west by south of Moriseni Peak. The feature was named by the Advisory Committee on Antarctic Names for Lieutenant Commander Clyde A. Beagle, U.S. Navy, LC-130 aircraft commander, Squadron VXE-6, U.S. Navy Operation Deepfreeze, 1969 and 1970.

== See also ==
- Saint George Peak
- Hageman Peak
- Duffy Peak
