= Serpent Nunatak =

Location of Alexander Island in the Antarctic Peninsula region

Serpent Nunatak (69°28′S 70°55′W) is a nunatak which is seen in the shape of a reverse letter S, rising to about 750 just west of Tufts Pass lying within the Nichols Snowfield, in the northern portion of Alexander Island, Antarctica. It is situated 6.4 km (4.0 mi) northeast of Lizard Nunatak and 6.23 kilometres (3.87 mi) south of Lesnovo Hill. The feature was descriptively named by United Kingdom Antarctic Place-Names Committee in 1977 because of the nunataks shape, the reverse letter S supposedly resembles a Serpent.

== See also ==
- Geode Nunataks
- Stephenson Nunatak
- Titan Nunatak
