= Mount Tchaikovsky =

Mountain on Alexander Island, Antarctica

Mount Tchaikovsky (71°23′S 73°15′W) is a snow-covered mountain, rising to about 600 metres (2,000 ft), with scarps on the south and east sides, located in the north part of Derocher Peninsula, situated in the southwest portion of Alexander Island, Antarctica.

A number of mountains in this vicinity first appear on maps by the Ronne Antarctic Research Expedition (RARE) in 1947–48. This mountain, apparently one of these, was mapped from RARE air photos by Searle of the Falkland Islands Dependencies Survey in 1960.

The feature was named by United Kingdom Antarctic Place-Names Committee after Peter Ilyitch Tchaikovsky (1840–1893), Russian composer.

== See also ==
- Mount Schumann
- Mount Spivey
- Mount Tyrrell
