= Shaw Nunatak =

Location of Alexander Island in the Antarctic Peninsula region

Satellite image of Alexander Island

Shaw Nunatak (69°33′S 71°12′W) is a nunatak rising to 500 m in Nichols Snowfield, northern Alexander Island, Antarctica. It is situated 5.3 km north-northeast of Rachenitsa Nunatak, 4.23 km east-southeast of Tipits Knoll and 7 km southeast of Mount Kliment Ohridski in Sofia University Mountains, 7.5 km southwest of Lizard Nunatak and 8.1 km northwest of Tegra Nunatak. The feature was photographed from the air by Ronne Antarctic Research Expedition in 1947–48, and mapped from these photographs by D. Searle of Falkland Islands Dependencies Survey, 1960. The nunatak was named by United Kingdom Antarctic Place-Names Committee in 1977 after Colin Shaw (1944–78), British Antarctic Survey surveyor who worked in Alexander Island, from 1975 to 1976.

== See also ==
- Dione Nunataks
- Franck Nunataks
- Quaver Nunatak
