= Mount Kliment Ohridski =

Mountain on Alexander Island, Antarctica

Location of Alexander Island in the Antarctic Peninsula region.

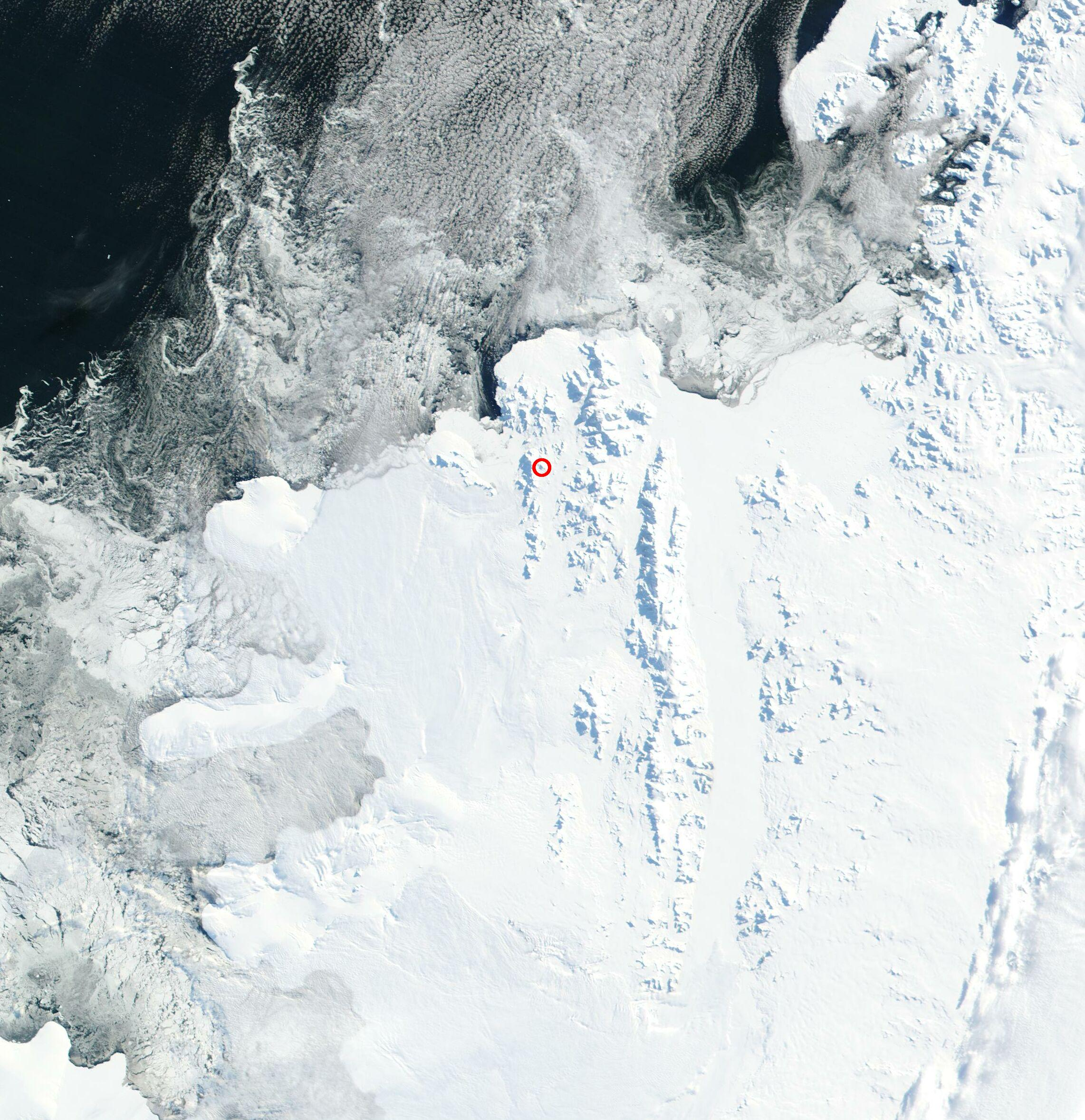
NASA satellite image of Alexander Island

Mount Kliment Ohridski (Bulgarian: връх Климент Охридски, romanized: vrah Kliment Ohridski, IPA: [ˈvrɤx ˈklimɛnt ˈɔxritski]) is the highest ridge (1422m) in the Sofia University Mountains on Alexander Island, Antarctica. The feature extends 7 km in the northwest–southeast direction with partly ice-free southern slopes. Shaw Nunatak is located in Nichols Snowfield 4 km off the southeast extremity of Mount Kliment Ohridski.

Following field work in northern Alexander Island by a joint British-Bulgarian party during the summer of 1987–88, the peak was named for Clement of Ohrid in association with the St. Kliment Ohridski University of Sofia.

== Location ==
The peak is located at 69°31′04″S 71°23′30″W which is 8.7 km northeast of Mount Devol, 7.15 km east-southeast of Mount Wilbye and 9.12 km south of the summit of Balan Ridge (British mapping of the area from air photos taken by the 1947-48 US Expedition under Ronne).

== Maps ==
- British Antarctic Territory. Scale 1:200000 topographic map No. 3127. DOS 610 - W 69 70. Tolworth, UK, 1971.
- Antarctic Digital Database (ADD). Scale 1:250000 topographic map of Antarctica. Scientific Committee on Antarctic Research (SCAR), 1993–2016.
