= Mount Wilbye =

Mountain on Alexander Island, Antarctica

Coordinates: 69°30′S 71°32′W

Location of Alexander Island in the Antarctic Peninsula region

Mount Wilbye is the highest peak (about 2,050 metres (6,730 ft)) of the Lassus Mountains in the north part of Alexander Island, Antarctica. It is situated 10.24 km north by west of Mount Devol. The mountain was first mapped from air photos taken by the Ronne Antarctic Research Expedition in 1947–48, by Searle of the Falkland Islands Dependencies Survey in 1960. Named by United Kingdom Antarctic Place-Names Committee after John Wilbye (1574–1638), English madrigal composer.

== See also ==
- Mount Spivey
- Mount Strauss
- Mount Tchaikovsky
