= Mount Braun =

Mountain on Alexander Island, Antarctica

- Location within Antarctica

Highest point
- Elevation: 900 m (3,000 ft)
- Coordinates: 69°26′S 71°24′W

Geography
- Location: Alexander Island, Antarctica
- Parent range: Sofia University Mountains

Mount Braun is a mountain rising to about 900 metres (3,000 ft) in the northwest extremity of Sofia Mountains in northern Alexander Island, Antarctica. The feature forms the northeast part of a horseshoe-shaped ridge 3.5 nautical miles (6.5 km; 4.0 mi) east-southeast of Mount Holt. It was named by the Advisory Committee on Antarctic Names for Lieutenant Commander William K. Braun, U.S. Navy, C-121J (Super Constellation) aircraft commander, Squadron VXE-6, U.S. Navy Operation Deepfreeze, 1970 and 1971.

== See also ==
- Mount Borodin
- Mount Paris
- Mount Liszt
