= Landers Peaks =

Peaks on Alexander Island, Antarctica

The Landers Peaks (69°26′S 71°12′W) are a group of peaks 4 nautical miles (7 km) east of Mount Braun, rising to about 1,000 metres (3,300 ft) between Palestrina Glacier and Nichols Snowfield in the northern portion of Alexander Island, Antarctica. They were named by the Advisory Committee on Antarctic Names for Commander Robert J. Landers, U.S. Navy, an LC-130 aircraft pilot in Squadron VXE-6 during U.S. Navy Operation Deep Freeze, 1965 and 1966.

== See also ==
- Lamina Peak
- Mimas Peak
- Saint George Peak
