= Elgar Uplands =

Coordinates: 69°39′S 70°43′W

Highest point
- Elevation: 2,580 m (8,460 ft)
- Prominence: 1,548 m (5,079 ft)
- Listing: Ultra, Ribu

The Elgar Uplands are uplands rising to 1,900 metres (6,200 ft), between Tufts Pass to the north and Sullivan Glacier to the south, in the northern part of Alexander Island, Antarctica. They were first photographed from the air and roughly mapped by the British Graham Land Expedition in 1937. They were remapped from air photos taken by the Ronne Antarctic Research Expedition, 1947–48, by D. Searle of the Falkland Islands Dependencies Survey in 1960, and from U.S. Landsat imagery of February, 1975. They were named by the UK Antarctic Place-Names Committee after Sir Edward Elgar, the English composer (1857–1934).
