= Sofia University Mountains =

Mountain range in Antarctica

Location of Alexander Island in the Antarctic Peninsula region.

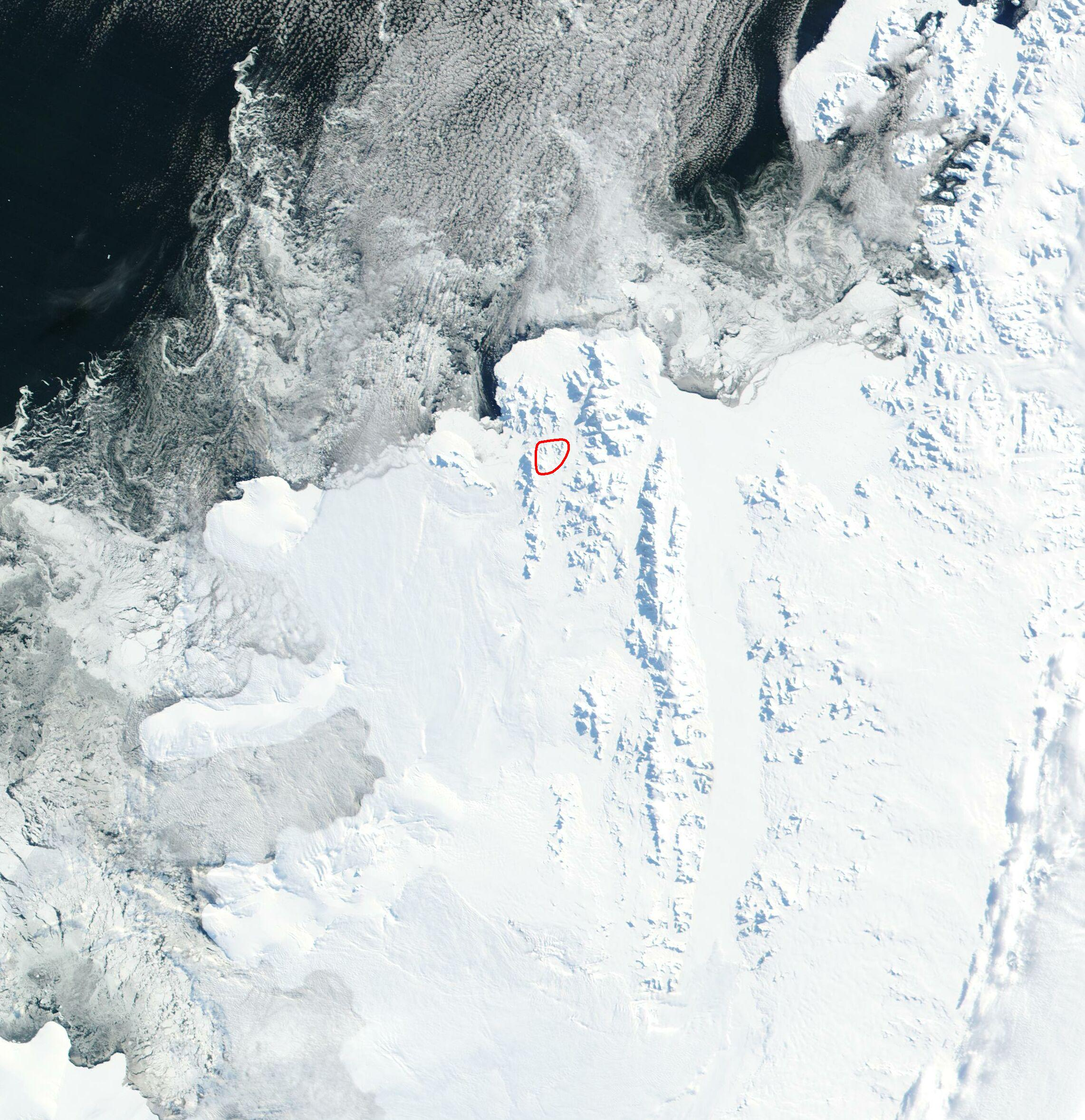
NASA satellite image of Alexander Island.

Sofia University Mountains (планина Софийски Университет \pla-ni-'na so-'fiy-ski u-ni-ver-si-'tet\) are a cluster of four small mountains, 21 kilometres (13 mi) long in the southwest–northeast direction and 12 kilometres (7.5 mi) wide, rising to ca. 1,422 metres (4,665 ft) (Mount Kliment Ohridski) in northern Alexander Island.

They are located south-southeast of Havre Mountains, southwest of Rouen Mountains, northwest of Elgar Uplands, east of the northern part of Lassus Mountains, and 6 kilometres (3.7 mi) inland from Lazarev Bay. Bounded by Palestrina Glacier to the north, Nichols Snowfield to the southeast, and McManus Glacier to the west. The mountains comprise Mount Braun to the northwest, Balan Ridge to the north and Landers Peaks to the northeast, and the ridge of Mount Kliment Ohridski to the south. The former three mountains are divided by Yozola Glacier flowing northwards to join Palestrina Glacier, and the 8 kilometres (5.0 mi) long, ice-filled Poste Valley respectively.

The name is of national culture and was given in commemoration of the centennial of Sofia University. During the first Bulgarian Antarctic campaign organized on that occasion, the southeast edge of Sofia University Mountains and foothills of neighbouring Rouen Mountains and Elgar Uplands were visited in February 1988 by a field party including two members of the British Antarctic Survey, geologist Philip Nell and mountain guide and physician Peter Marquis, and two Bulgarian geologists, Christo Pimpirev and Borislav Kamenov.

== Location ==
The mountains are centred at 69°28′30″S 71°20′00″W. They were seen from the air and roughly mapped by the 1936-37 British Graham Land Expedition with more detailed British mapping in 1960 from air photos taken by the 1947-48 US Expedition under Ronne.

== Maps ==
- British Antarctic Territory. Scale 1:200000 topographic map. DOS 610 – W 69 70. Tolworth, UK, 1971
- Antarctic Digital Database (ADD). Scale 1:250000 topographic map of Antarctica. Scientific Committee on Antarctic Research (SCAR). Since 1993, regularly upgraded and updated
