= Christo Pimpirev =

Bulgarian scientist and polar explorer (born 1953)

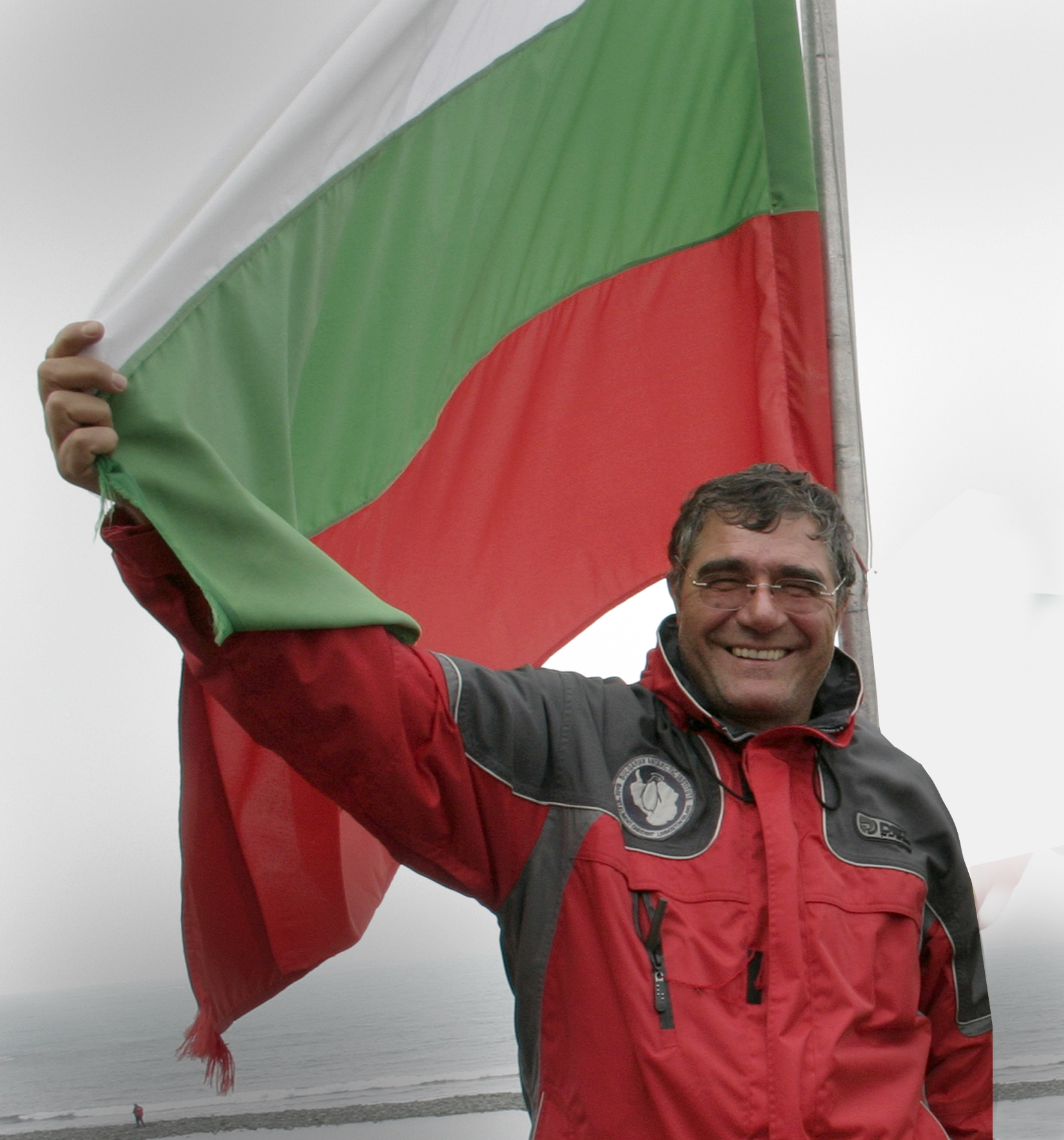
- Born: 13 February 1953 (age 73); Sofia, Bulgaria
- Education: Sofia University
- Occupations: scientist, polar explorer

Christo Pimpirev (Bulgarian: Христо Пимпирев) is a Bulgarian scientist (geologist) and polar explorer.

== Academic career ==
He was born on Friday, 13 February 1953, in Sofia, Bulgaria. After graduating from Sofia University with a master's degree in geology in 1978 and getting his PhD in 1986, he became an associate professor till 2004 and a full-time professor in 2005 at Sofia University “St. Kliment Ohridski”. In 2017, he defended his dissertation on "Stratigraphy and Geological Evolution of Livingston Island during the Cretaceous Period" and acquired the degree of Doctor of Science.

Prof. Pimpirev is a doyen of the Bulgarian Antarctic Program. He took part in the first Bulgarian Antarctic Expedition during the 1987/88 austral summer, and has been the leader of the annual Bulgarian scientific campaigns in Antarctica from 1993 until now. He became the founding father of the Bulgarian Antarctic Institute and its director since 1993 up to now. He is also a director of the National Center for Polar Research since 2007.

The discovery of the Upper Tithonian ammonite in 2002, in the vicinity of the Bulgarian Antarctic base, revealed itself to be one of Pimpirev’s most satisfying scientific career achievements. The breakthrough that occurred there changed the established knowledge of the evolution of the Gondwana continent.

He has participated in research expeditions to Mount Ama Dablam, Nepal Himalayas, in Speleological expedition in China Karst Plateau in a project for gold searching in Vietnam, in Colombian Andes research, in a Canadian-Bulgarian expedition to Ellesmere Island, Canadian Arctic.

Christo Pimpirev is teaching Historical Geology and Palaeogeography. He has been a lecturer in the United States, Portugal, Uruguay, Chile, Colombia, Germany, Great Britain, France, Spain, Argentina, Canada, South Korea, and many other countries. He is an author of 7 books, 7 popular science films, and more than 250 scientific publications in leading Bulgarian and foreign magazines.

He is the first official representative of Bulgaria who visited South Pole - on January 8, 2013. Prof. Pimpirev steps on the southernmost point of the planet as a member of an international expedition dedicated to the 100th anniversary of the conquest of the South Pole by Roald Amundsen and Robert Scott.

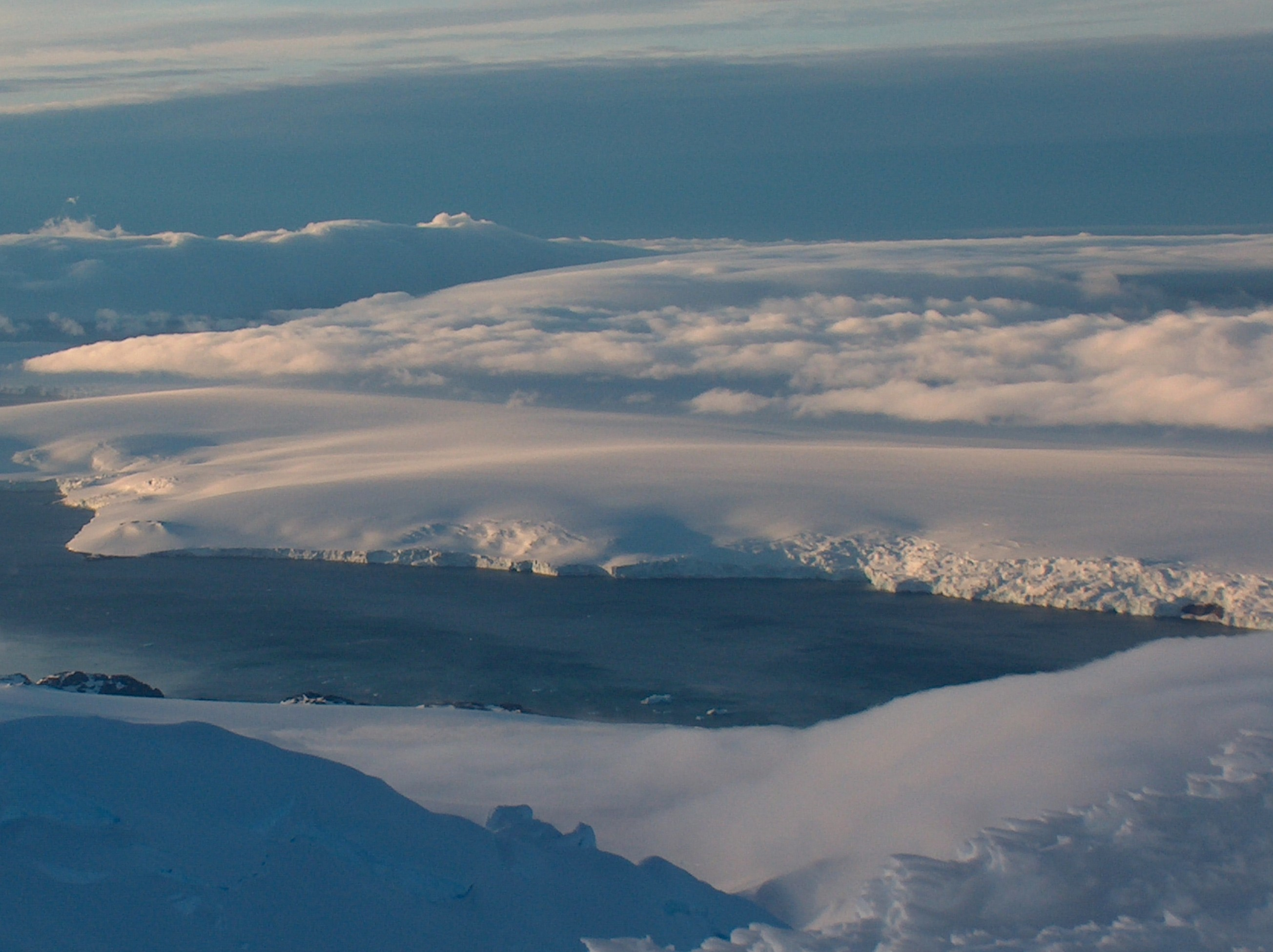
Pimpirev Beach from Lyaskovets Peak

Pimpirev Glacier and Pimpirev Beach on Livingston Island, South Shetland Islands, are named for Christo Pimpirev.

== Membership in international organizations ==
- Representative of the Republic of Bulgaria in the Scientific Committee on Antarctic Research since 1994.
- Representative of the Republic of Bulgaria to the Council of Managers of National Antarctic Programs since 1994, EXCOM member in the period 2006-2009.
- Representative of the Republic of Bulgaria in the Antarctic Treaty Consultative Meetings since 1995.
- Representative of the Republic of Bulgaria in the European Polar Board (EPB) since 2001, EXCOM member in the period 2009-2012.

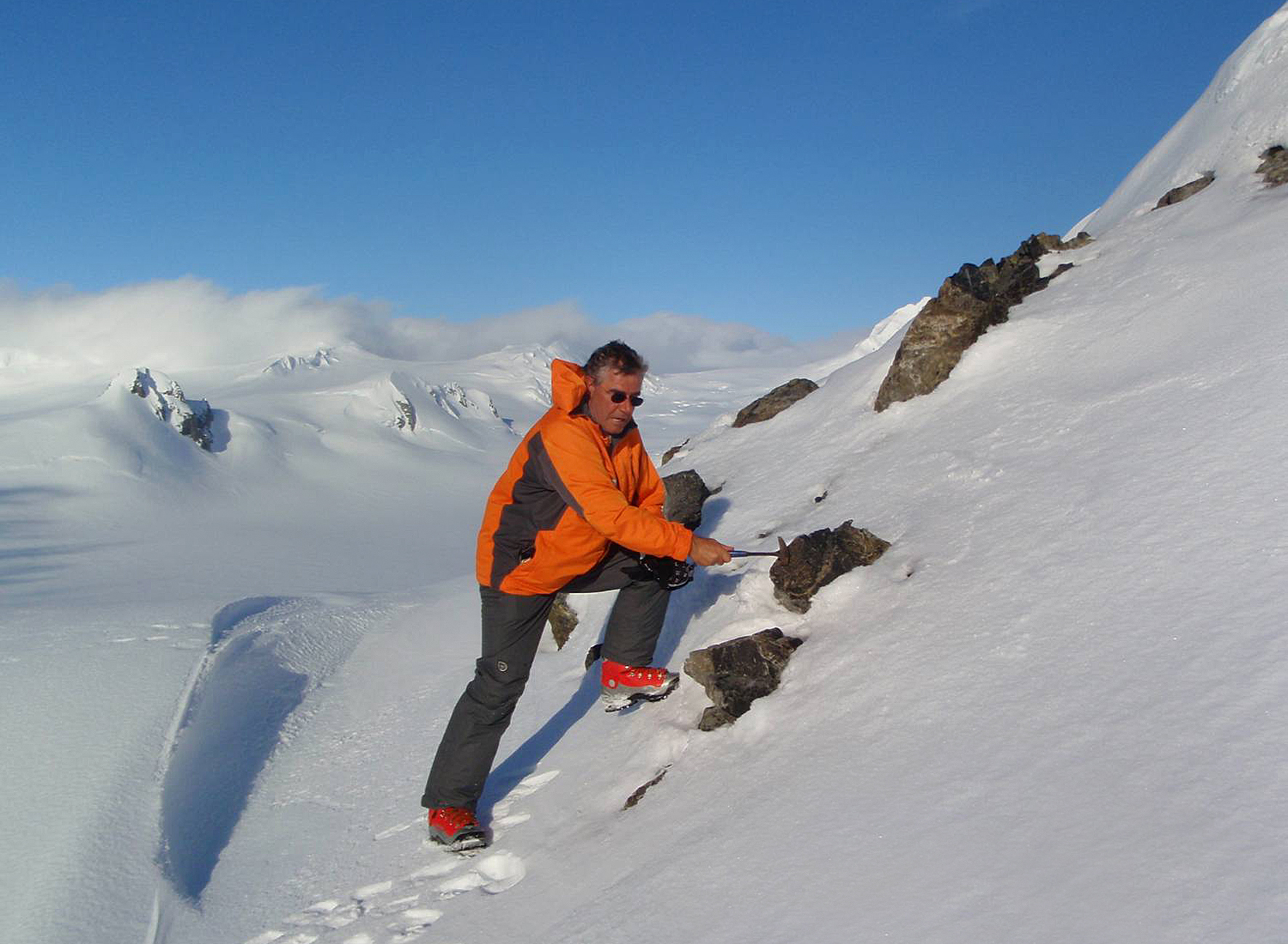
Geological survey on Livingston Island, Antarctica

== Awards ==
- Order of Saints Cyril and Methodius (1st Class)
- Highest Mongolian state order "Polar Star" - for merits in the creation of the Mongolian Antarctic Institute and laying the foundations of Mongolian research in Antarctica
- Jubilee Medal of Sofia University "St. Kliment Ohridski" (1st Class)
- "Golden Book" for contribution to the development of the Bulgarian Science and Culture
- First winner of the Honorary badge for contribution to Bulgarian national ideals established by VMRO
- Honorary Citizen of Lyaskovets town
- Memorial plaque of the Committee for Environmental Protection in the Antarctic Treaty Consultative Meeting (ATCM) - for his active role in the environmental protection of Antarctica

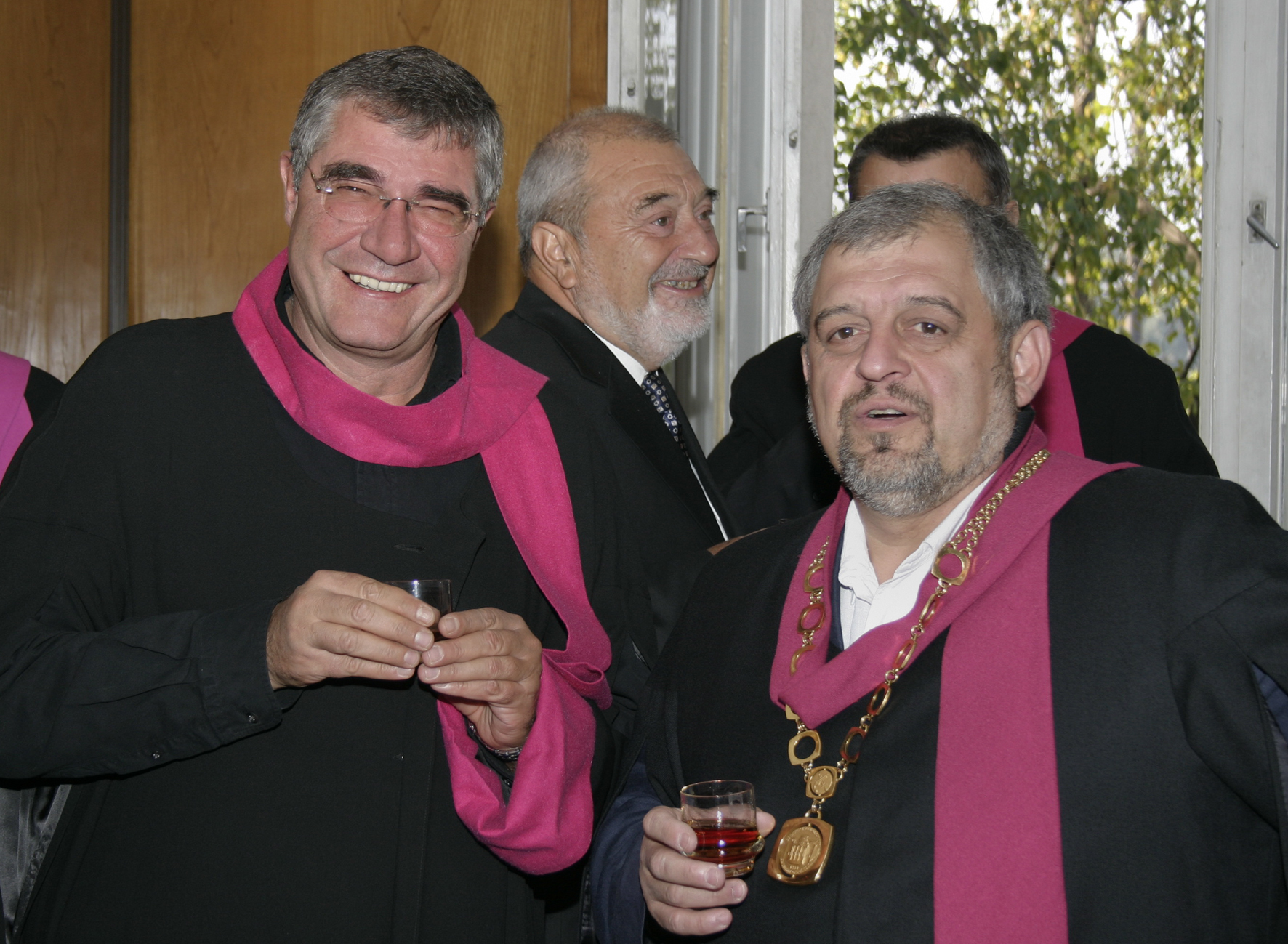
Prof. Pimpirev, as a part of Sofia University's Academic Council

== Books ==
- Kamenov, Borislav; Pimpirev, Christo (1993). Touching the Antarctic (in Bulgarian). Sofia: St. Kliment Ohridski University Press. ISBN 954-07-0120-1.
- Pimpirev, Ch., Balabanski, D. 1998. Ice magic, St. Kliment Ohridski University Press, Sofia
- Pimpirev, Ch., Davidov, N. 2003. Antarctica: The Extreme South. St. Kliment Ohridski University Press, Sofia
- Pimpirev, Ch., 2010. History of the Earth, St. Kliment Ohridski University Press, Sofia, second edition
- Pimpirev, Ch., 2013. Antarctic Diaries, St. Kliment Ohridski University Press, Sofia
- Pimpirev, Ch., 2014. Los diarios de la Antartida, St. Kliment Ochridski University Press, Sofia
- Pimpirev, Ch., Chipev, N., 2015. Bulgarian Antarctic Research, St. Kliment Ochridski University Press, Sofia
- Pimpirev, Ch., 2017. Antarctica - cold south, Avliga Press, Sofia
- Pimpirev, Ch., 2019. History of the Earth, St. Kliment Ohridski University Press, Sofia, third edition
- 2025: Антарктида – история, природа, българските полярници (with Iglika Trifonova)
  A popular science encyclopedic book about Antarctica. Its part is a description of Antarctica, The second part is about the discovery and exploration of Antarctica; it also includes art and music in the world of Antarctica, as well as popular legends and myths. The third part is about the Bulgarians in Antarctica.

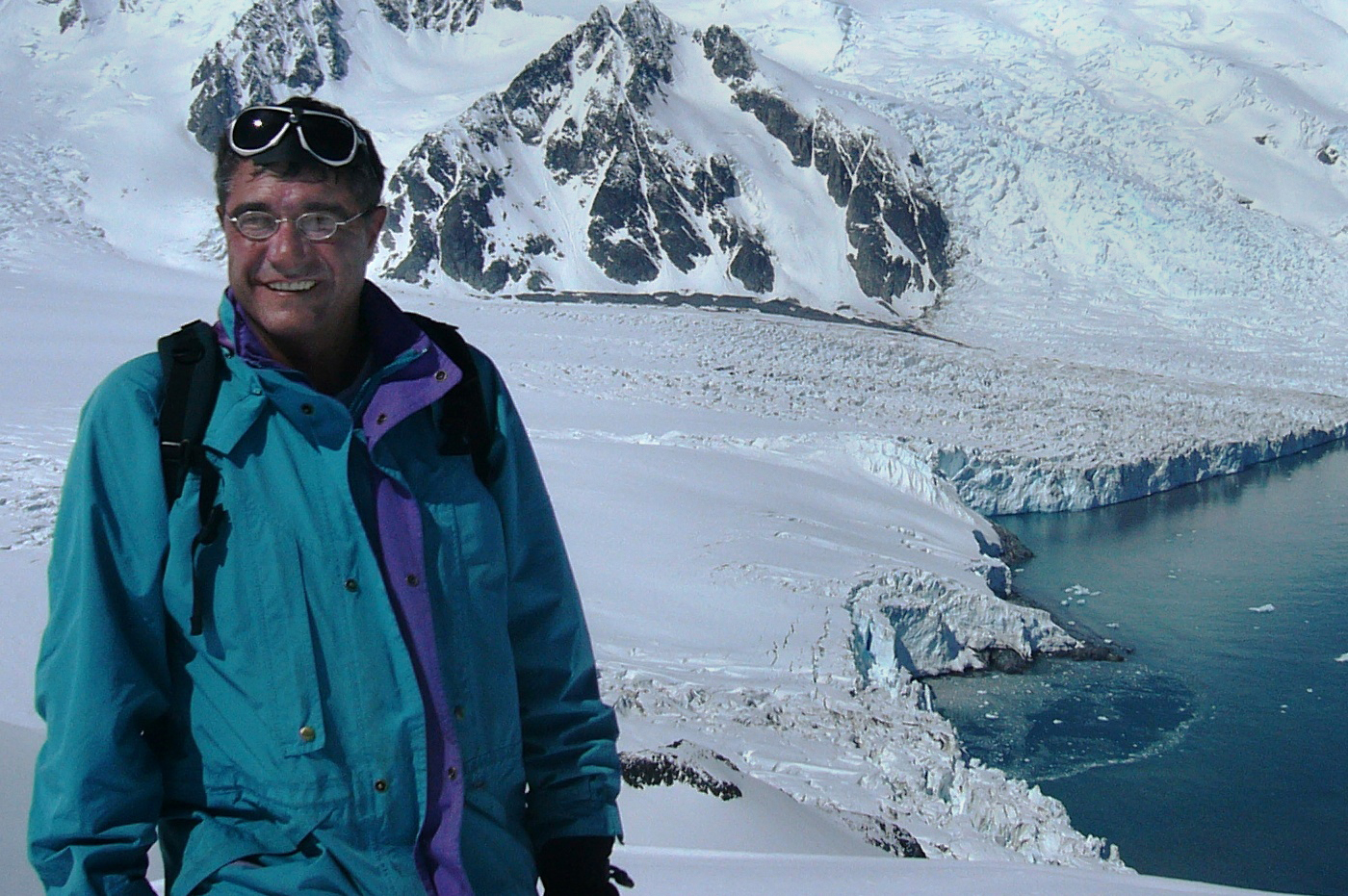
Christo Pimpirev in Antarctica

== Popular science films ==
- "Expedition to Antarctica" - National Television, Atlas Program (1988) - author
- "Bulgaria in Antarctica" - National Television, Atlas Program (1994) - author
- "Southern Summer" - National Television, Atlas Program (1995) - author
- "Bulgaria on two oceans" - National TV, Atlas program (1996) - scriptwriter
- "Under the Sign of the Southern Cross" - National Television (2006) - writer
- "Antarctica 2012" - Films Author (2012) – consultant
- “90 degrees South” (2014) – Bulgarian National Television - author
- "Antarctica - Ice Love" (2015) - BTV - author
- "One Antarctic summer" (2018) - Bulgarian Antarctic Institute - producer

== Feature films ==
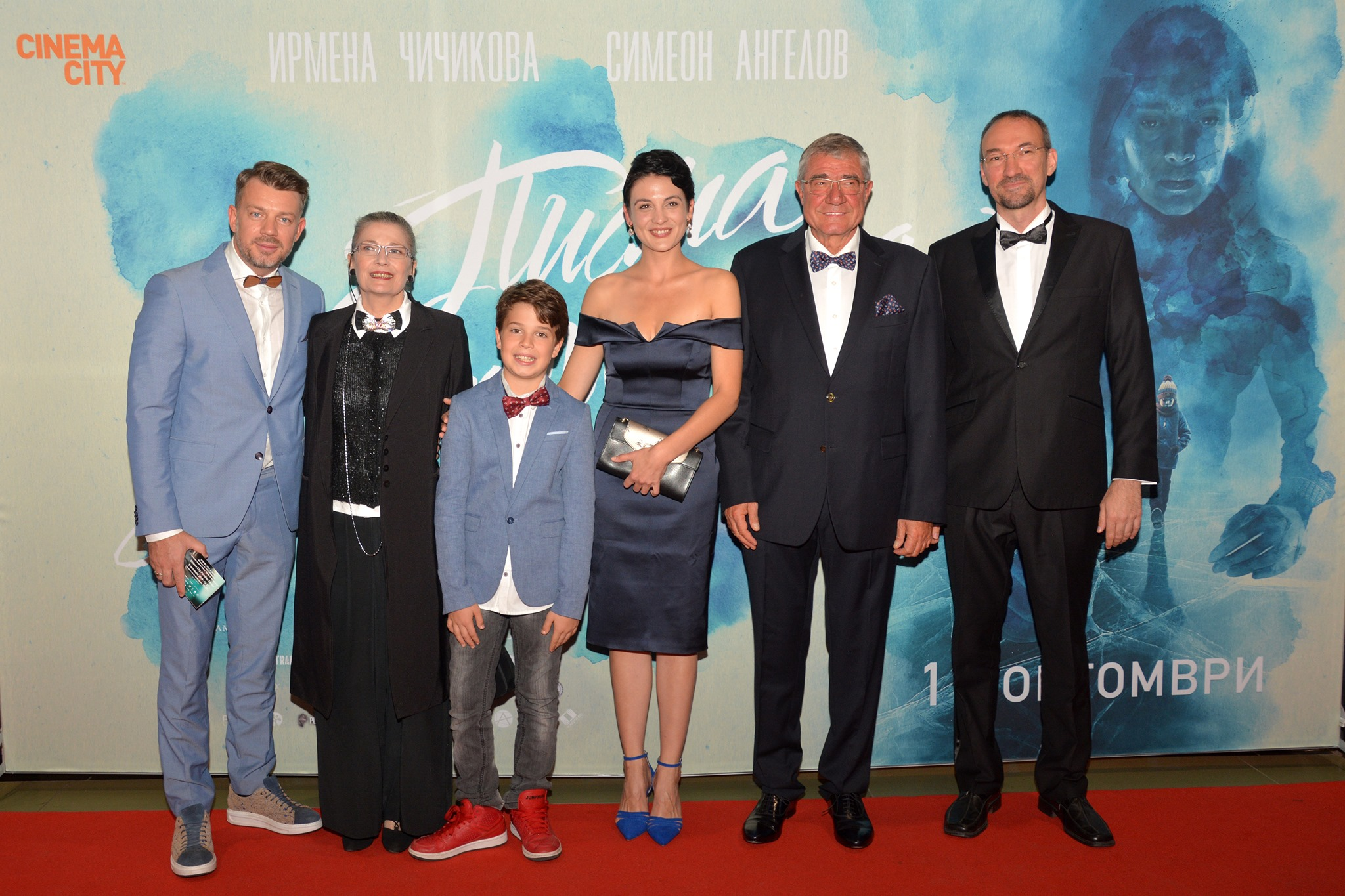
Premiere of the film "Letters from Antarctica"

- „Letters from Antarctica”(2019) – Lenta Films. Director: Stanislav Donchev; Writers: Georgi Ivanov, Nevena Kertova; Stars: Diana Dimitrova, Irmena Chichikova, Ivan Stamenov, Christo Pimpirev; Consultant: Christo Pimpirev. A single mother, wanting to protect her eight-year-old son from pain, lies to him that his dad is away with the Antarctic expedition. But postponing the confession about the father's death, causes damage to her and her son. Some of the film's pictures were indeed taken on the Icy continent during a Bulgarian expedition to Livingston Island. Christo Pimpirev himself plays the role of leader of the Bulgarian polar expedition. With the footage filmed in Antarctica, the film sets a precedent in the making of feature films in the world.
