= Lassus Mountains =

Mountain range in Antarctica

The Lassus Mountains (69°35′S 71°38′W) are a large group of mountains, 15 nautical miles (28 km) long and 3 nautical miles (6 km) wide, rising to 2,100 metres (6,900 ft) and extending south from Palestrina Glacier in the northwest part of Alexander Island, Antarctica. They overlook Lazarev Bay and a few minor islands within the bay such as Dint Island and Umber Island; Haydn Inlet lies to the south while the Havre Mountains lie immediately north.

The mountains were probably first seen on 9 January 1821 by a Russian expedition under Fabian Gottlieb von Bellingshausen. They were photographed from the air in 1936 by the British Graham Land Expedition but mapped as part of the Havre Mountains. They were first mapped in detail, from air photos taken by the Ronne Antarctic Research Expedition (1947–48), by D. Searle of the Falkland Islands Dependencies Survey in 1960, and were named by the UK Antarctic Place-Names Committee after Orlandus Lassus, a Belgian composer of the 16th century.

== See also ==
- Colbert Mountains
- Rouen Mountains
- Sofia University Mountains
