= Nichols Snowfield =

Ice field in Antarctica

Nichols Snowfield (69°25′S 71°5′W) is a snowfield, 22 nautical miles (41 km) long and 8 nautical miles (15 km) wide, bounded by the Rouen Mountains and Elgar Uplands to the east and Lassus Mountains to the west, in the north part of Alexander Island, Antarctica. The snowfield was first sighted from the air and roughly mapped by the British Graham Land Expedition (BGLE) in 1937. Mapped in detail from air photos taken by the Ronne Antarctic Research Expedition (RARE), 1947–48, by Searle of the Falkland Islands Dependencies Survey (FIDS) in 1960. It is named by the RARE for Dr. Robert L. Nichols, head of the Department of Geology, Tufts University, and senior scientist of the Ronne expedition.
