= Lamina Peak =

Mountain in Antarctica

Lamina Peak (70°32′S 68°45′W) is a prominent pyramid-shaped peak, 1,280 metres (4,200 ft) high, surmounting a stratified ridge which curves down from Mount Edred northeastward toward George VI Sound. The peak stands 4.5 nautical miles (8 km) inland from the east coast of Alexander Island near the southern limit of the Douglas Range. It was first photographed from the air on November 23, 1935, by Lincoln Ellsworth and mapped from these photos by W.L.G. Joerg. It was roughly surveyed in 1936 by the British Graham Land Expedition and resurveyed in 1949 by the Falkland Islands Dependencies Survey (FIDS), and was so named by the FIDS because of the marked horizontal stratification of the rocks of this peak.

== See also ==
- Mount Nicholas
- Mount Sanderson
- Mount Spivey
