= Mount Tilley =

Mountain on Alexander Island, Antarctica

Mount Tilley (69°45′S 69°29′W) is a flat-topped, ice-capped mountain, rising to about 1,900 m, lying about 7 nautical miles (13 km) south of Mount Tyrrell and 3 nautical miles (6 km) inland from George VI Sound in the east part of Alexander Island, Antarctica. Despite its height, it is best described as a foothill of the Douglas Range, from which it is separated by Toynbee Glacier. The mountain was first photographed from the air in 1936 by the British Graham Land Expedition. Surveyed in 1948 by the Falkland Islands Dependencies Survey and named by them for Cecil E. Tilley, professor of mineralogy and petrology at Cambridge University.

== See also ==
- Mount Huckle
- Mount Nicholas
- Mount Ethelred
