= Mount Edred =

Mountain on Alexander Island, Antarctica

- Location within Antarctica

Highest point
- Elevation: 2,195 m (7,201 ft)
- Coordinates: 70°35′S 69°0′W

Geography
- Location: Alexander Island, Antarctica
- Parent range: Douglas Range

Mount Edred (70°35′S 69°0′W) is a prominent ice-covered mountain, 2,195 metres (7,200 ft) high, which stands 10 nautical miles (19 km) inland from George VI Sound, lies about 12 miles (19 km) north of Galileo Cliffs, and marks the southern limit of the Douglas Range on Alexander Island, Antarctica. It was first photographed from the air on November 23, 1935 by Lincoln Ellsworth and mapped from these photos by W.L.G. Joerg. Its east side was roughly surveyed in 1936 by the British Graham Land Expedition and resurveyed in 1949 by the Falkland Islands Dependencies Survey (FIDS). It was named by the FIDS for Edred, a Saxon king of England in the 10th century. The west face of the mountain was mapped from air photos taken by the Ronne Antarctic Research Expedition, 1947–48, by D. Searle of the FIDS in 1960. Mount Edred is the ninth highest peak of Alexander Island, succeeded by Mount Calais and proceeded by Mount Spivey.

== See also ==
- Mount Ethelwulf
- Mount Ethelred
- Mount Athelstan
