= Arenite Ridge =

Arenite Ridge (69°41′S 69°32′W) is a steep-sided rock and snow ridge in northern Alexander Island, extending 15 nautical miles (28 km) in a north–south direction lying immediately west of the Douglas Range and forming the eastern wall of Toynbee Glacier. The ridge includes Mount Tyrrell (which has two summits) and Mount Tilley. It was named by the UK Antarctic Place-Names Committee in 1977 from the sandstone-type rocks (arenite) that form this feature.
