= Mount Umbriel =

Mountain on Alexander Island, Antarctica

Coordinates: 71°36′S 68°53′W

Mount Umbriel is a peak, rising to about 1,500 m, overlooking the head of Venus Glacier on the east coast of Alexander Island, Antarctica, with the east face of the mountain overlooking the George VI Ice Shelf that occupies George VI Sound. The mountain was first mapped by Searle of the Falkland Islands Dependencies Survey in 1960, from air photos taken by the Ronne Antarctic Research Expedition in 1947–48. Named by the United Kingdom Antarctic Place-Names Committee from association with nearby Uranus Glacier, Umbriel being one of the satellites of the planet Uranus, the seventh planet of the Solar System.

== See also ==
- Mount Athelstan
- Mount Holt
- Mount Spivey
