= Trench Glacier =

Glacier in Antarctica

Trench Glacier (70°12′S 69°11′W) is a deeply entrenched glacier extending along the east coast of Alexander Island, Antarctica, 6 nautical miles (11 km) long and 2 nautical miles (3.7 km) wide, which flows east into the George VI Ice Shelf that occupies George VI Sound immediately south of Mount Athelstan. The mouth of this glacier was first photographed from the air on November 23, 1935, by Lincoln Ellsworth, and it was mapped from these photos by W.L.G. Joerg. Trench Glacier was surveyed in 1948 and 1949 by the Falkland Islands Dependencies Survey, who applied this descriptive name.

== See also ==
- Tumble Glacier
- Transition Glacier
- Wager Glacier
