= Tumble Glacier =

Glacier in Antarctica

Tumble Glacier (69°57′S 69°20′W) is a glacier extending along the east side of Alexander Island, Antarctica, 7 nautical miles (13 km) long and 3 nautical miles (6 km) wide, which flows east from the cliffs of Mount Egbert, Mount Ethelwulf and Mount Ethelred of the Douglas Range into the west side of the George VI Ice Shelf that occupies George VI Sound immediately south of Mount King. The glacier was first roughly surveyed in 1936 by the British Graham Land Expedition under Rymill. Resurveyed in 1948 by the Falkland Islands Dependencies Survey, and so named by them because of the extremely broken condition of the lower reaches of the glacier.

== See also ==
- Asafiev Glacier
- Clarsach Glacier
- Narechen Glacier
