= Damocles Point =

Damocles Point (69°39′S 69°21′W) is a headland on the east coast of Alexander Island, 3 nautical miles (6 km) east-southeast of the south summit of Mount Tyrrell. A small rock exposure near sea level is surmounted by a 60 metres (200 ft) ice cliff. The headland is adjacent to George VI Sound and is facing towards the Rymill Coast in Palmer Land. It was first photographed from the air in 1937 by the British Graham Land Expedition under Rymill. It was surveyed in 1948 by the Falkland Islands Dependencies Survey, and so named by them because the ice cliff overhanging the spot where geological specimens were collected seemed like the sword of Damocles.
