= Mount Ethelwulf =

Mountain on Alexander Island, Antarctica

- Location within Antarctica

Highest point
- Elevation: 2,590 m (8,500 ft)
- Coordinates: 70°2′S 69°34′W

Geography
- Location: Alexander Island, Antarctica
- Parent range: Douglas Range

Mount Ethelwulf (70°2′S 69°34′W) is a mainly ice-covered mountain, 2,590 metres (8,500 ft) high, standing between Mount Egbert and Mount Ethelred at the head of Tumble Glacier, in the Douglas Range of northeast Alexander Island, Antarctica. The mountain was probably first observed by Lincoln Ellsworth, who photographed the east side of the Douglas Range from the air on November 23, 1935; its east face was roughly surveyed in 1936 by the British Graham Land Expedition under John Rymill. It was resurveyed in 1948 by the Falkland Islands Dependencies Survey (FIDS) and named for Ethelwulf, Saxon King of England, 839–858. The west face of the mountain was mapped from air photos taken by the Ronne Antarctic Research Expedition, 1947–48, by D. Searle of the FIDS in 1960. Mount Ethelwulf is the fourth highest peak of Alexander Island, succeeded by Mount Paris and proceeded by Mount Huckle.

== See also ==
- Mount Athelstan
- Mount Bayonne
- Mount Cupola
