= Marr Bluff =

Marr Bluff (69°47′S 69°20′W) is an exposed, rocky bluff, 1,065 metres (3,500 ft) high, immediately north of Wager Glacier on the east coast of Alexander Island, Antarctica. The cliff lies east of Mount Huckle and Mount Tilley in the Douglas Range. Marr Bluff was surveyed by the Falkland Islands Dependencies Survey in 1948 and named by them for English geologist John E. Marr, professor of geology at Cambridge University, 1917–30.
