= Toynbee Glacier =

Glacier in Antarctica

Toynbee Glacier (69°35′S 69°35′W) is a glacier situated in the northeast portion of Alexander Island, Antarctica, extending 17 nautical miles (31 km) long and 5 nautical miles (9 km) wide, lying between Mount Huckle, Mount Spivey and Mount Stephenson of the northern portion of the Douglas Range on the west and Mount Tyrrell and Mount Tilley on the east. It flows north from the east face of Mount Stephenson into the George VI Ice Shelf that occupies George VI Sound. The glacier was first photographed from the air in 1937 by the British Graham Land Expedition under Rymill. Surveyed in 1948 by the Falkland Islands Dependencies Survey and named for Patrick A. Toynbee, FIDS air pilot at Stonington Island in 1948 and 1949.

== See also ==
- List of glaciers in the Antarctic
- Paulus Glacier
- Transition Glacier
- Yozola Glacier
