= Witches Cauldron (Antarctica) =

Ice-filled basin on Alexander Island, Antarctica

- Location within Antarctica
- Location: Douglas Range, Alexander Island, Antarctica
- Coordinates: 69°56′S 69°49′W
- Type: Basin
- Etymology: Description of the basin's shape

Witches Cauldron (69°56′S 69°49′W) is an ice-filled basin on the west side of the Douglas Range, immediately west of Mount Egbert in the north part of Alexander Island, Antarctica. The basin was first sighted from the air and roughly mapped by the British Graham Land expedition in 1937. More accurately mapped from air photos taken by the Ronne Antarctic Research Expedition in 1947–48, by Searle of the Falkland Islands Dependencies Survey in 1960. Named by the UK Antarctic Place-Names Committee for the feature's kettle-like shape.
