= Mount Hahn =

Mountain on Alexander Island, Antarctica

- Location within Antarctica

Highest point
- Elevation: 1,100 metres (3,600 ft)
- Coordinates: 69°17′S 70°9′W

Geography
- Location: Alexander Island, Antarctica
- Parent range: Staccato Peaks

Mount Hahn is a mountain, about 1,100 metres (3,600 ft) high, situated between Walter Glacier and Hampton Glacier at the head of Schokalsky Bay, in northeastern Alexander Island, Antarctica. It was photographed from the air by the Ronne Antarctic Research Expedition, 1947–48, and surveyed by the Falkland Islands Dependencies Survey, 1948–50. It was named by the Advisory Committee on Antarctic Names for Lieutenant Commander Gerald L. Hahn, a U.S. Navy LC-130 aircraft pilot during Operation Deep Freeze, 1975 and 1976.

== See also ==
- Mount Athelstan
- Mount Bayonne
- Mount Cupola
