= Mount Sanderson =

Mountain on Alexander Island, Antarctica

Location of Alexander Island in the Antarctic Peninsula region

Mount Sanderson (69°17′S 70°47′W) is a mountain rising to about 2,300 m in south Rouen Mountains, situated in the northern portion of Alexander Island, Antarctica. It is situated 22.5 km east of Breze Peak in Havre Mountains. The mountain was first surveyed by the British Antarctic Survey in 1975–76. Named by United Kingdom Antarctic Place-Names Committee in 1980 after Timothy John Oliver Sanderson, glaciologist who was a member of the British Antarctic Survey during 1975–78, he worked on the George VI Ice Shelf.

== See also ==
- Mount Nicholas
- Mount Spivey
- Mount Tchaikovsky
