= Stephenson Nunatak =

Nunatak on Alexander Island, Antarctica

Stephenson Nunatak (72°11′S 69°5′W) is a prominent, pyramid-shaped rock nunatak, rising to about 640 m, which rises 300 m above the surrounding ice at the northwest side of Kirwan Inlet in the southeast part of Alexander Island, Antarctica. Discovered and roughly surveyed in 1940-41 by Finn Ronne and Carl R. Eklund of the United States Antarctic Service. Resurveyed in 1949 by the Falkland Islands Dependencies Survey and named by the United Kingdom Antarctic Place-Names Committee for Alfred Stephenson, surveyor with the British Graham Land Expedition, who led a sledge party south into George VI Sound to about 72S in 1936. There happens to be another landform on Alexander Island which is named after Alfred Stephenson, that being Mount Stephenson, the highest point of Alexander Island rising to 2,987 m.

== See also ==
- Admirals Nunatak
- Atoll Nunataks
- Dione Nunataks
