= Alfred Stephenson =

Polar explorer and surveyor (1908–1999)

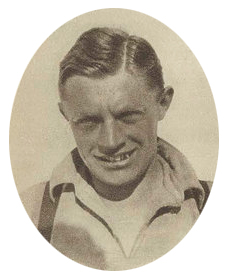

Alfred Stephenson OBE (25 November 1908 – 3 July 1999) was an English polar explorer and surveyor.

== Biography ==
Stephenson was born in Norwich, England and was educated at Norwich School. At age 12 he attended a public lecture given by Ernest Shackleton which inspired his interest in the polar regions. He went on to study geography at St. Catharine's College, Cambridge where he befriended Frank Debenham who had been on the Terra Nova Expedition led by Robert Falcon Scott between 1910 and 1913.

Following graduation Stephenson joined the British Arctic Air Route Expedition to Greenland as chief surveyor. In often difficult polar conditions the expedition surveyed a strategic area of Greenland valuable to the Great Circle air route between the British Isles and North America, work for which Stephenson was awarded the Polar Medal. Despite his inexperience as a climber he held the altitude record of Mont Forel at 10,950 ft with his companion Lawrence Wager for many years, even though they were not able to reach the 11,099 ft high summit owing to the ice dome at the top.

In 1932 he was a member of the British Polar Year Expedition. In 1934 he was chief surveyor and meteorologist of the British Graham Land Expedition in the Antarctic.

During the Second World War he joined the RAF as chief instructor at the Central Allied Photo Interpretation Unit. For his work in training interpreters and helping to develop new photographic interpretation techniques he was appointed an OBE. In 1945 he joined Imperial College London, where he was involved in teaching and research until his retirement in 1972. From 1956 to 1996 he was the honorary secretary of the Antarctic Club.

== Legacy ==
Mount Stephenson, the highest peak (3,100 m) in the Douglas Range of Antarctica, and Stephenson Nunatak, in the southeast part of Alexander Island, as well as Stephenson Island (Greenland), are named after him.
