= Les Dents =

Topographic feature on Alexander Island, Antarctica

Les Dents (68°57′S 70°58′W) is a conspicuous landmark consisting of four toothlike peaks, uniform in height and rising to about 1,500 metres (5,000 ft) between Mount Bayonne and Mount Paris, situated within the Rouen Mountains in the northern part of Alexander Island, Antarctica. The feature was first roughly mapped and named "Les Dents" (the teeth) by the French Antarctic Expedition, 1908–10, under Jean-Baptiste Charcot. It was further mapped, from air photos taken by the Ronne Antarctic Research Expedition, 1947–48, by D. Searle of the Falkland Islands Dependencies Survey in 1960.
