= Mount Ethelred =

Mountain on Alexander Island, Antarctica

- Location within Antarctica

Highest point
- Elevation: 2,470 m (8,100 ft)
- Coordinates: 70°4′S 69°29′W

Geography
- Location: Alexander Island, Antarctica
- Parent range: Douglas Range

Mount Ethelred (70°4′S 69°29′W) is a mainly ice-covered mountain, 2,470 metres (8,100 ft) high, 3 nautical miles (6 km) southeast of Mount Ethelwulf and 8 nautical miles (15 km) inland from George VI Sound, in the Douglas Range of Alexander Island, Antarctica. The mountain was probably first observed by Lincoln Ellsworth, who photographed the east side of the Douglas Range from the air on November 23, 1935; its east face was roughly surveyed in 1936 by the British Graham Land Expedition. It was resurveyed in 1948 by the Falkland Islands Dependencies Survey (FIDS) and named for Ethelred I, Saxon King of England, 865–871. The west face of the mountain was mapped from air photos taken by the Ronne Antarctic Research Expedition, 1947–48, by D. Searle of the FIDS in 1960. Mount Ethelred is the seventh highest peak of Alexander Island, proceeded by Mount Calais.

== See also ==
- Mount Edred
- Mount Paris
- Mount Cupola
