= Wager Glacier =

Glacier in Antarctica

- Location within Antarctica
- Location: Alexander Island, Antarctica
- Coordinates: 69°48′S 69°23′W
- Thickness: unknown
- Terminus: George VI Sound
- Status: unknown

Wager Glacier is a small, heavily crevassed glacier on the east coast of Alexander Island, Antarctica. It occupies a trench-like valley and flows east into George VI Sound immediately south of Marr Bluff. The glacier was surveyed in 1948 by the Falkland Islands Dependencies Survey and named by them for Lawrence R. Wager, Arctic explorer and professor of geology at Oxford University.

== See also ==
- Hampton Glacier
- Hushen Glacier
- Tumble Glacier
