= Schokalsky Bay =

Bay in Alexander Island, Antarctica

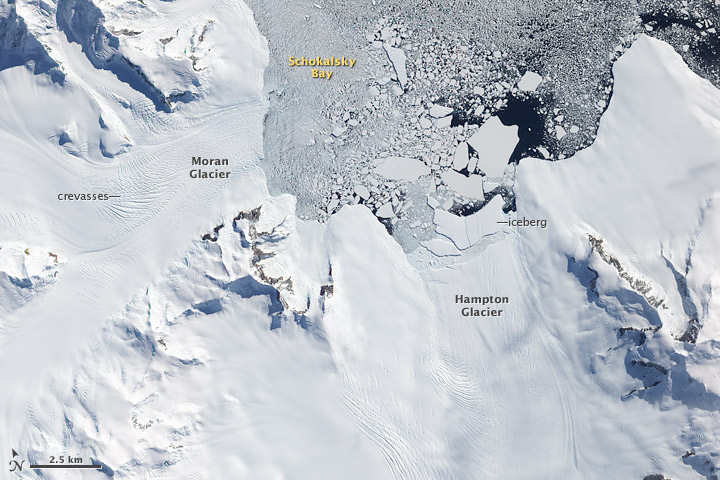
Schokalsky Bay with icebergs calved from the Hampton Glacier.

Schokalsky Bay (69°15′S 69°55′W) is the easternmost bay of Alexander Island, Antarctica, 9 nautical miles (17 km) wide at its entrance and indenting 6 nautical miles (11 km) lying between Mount Calais and Cape Brown along the east coast of Alexander Island whilst adjacent to the George VI Ice Shelf in George VI Sound. Hampton Glacier discharges tremendous amounts of ice into the head of Schokalsky Bay at a steep gradient causing the ice there to be extremely broken and irregular, and discourages use of this bay and glacier as an inland sledging route onto northeast Alexander Island. The bay was first sighted from a distance in 1909 and roughly charted by the French Antarctic Expedition under Charcot who, thinking it to be a strait, gave the name "Detroit Schokalsky" after Yuly Shokalsky, a Russian geographer, meteorologist and oceanographer. Charcot followed the spelling Schokalsky used by the man himself when writing in Roman script. The coast in this vicinity was photographed from the air and this bay roughly charted in 1937 by the British Graham Land Expedition, but Charcot's "Detroit Schokalsky" was not identified. Surveys by Falkland Islands Dependencies Survey in 1948 identified this bay as the feature originally named by Charcot.
