= Citadel Bastion =

Citadel Bastion (72°0′S 68°32′W) is a rocky, flat-topped elevation at the south side of the terminus of Saturn Glacier, facing towards George VI Sound and the Rymill Coast, situated on the east side of Alexander Island, Antarctica. Its maximum elevation is about 645 m. Citadel Bastion lies next to Hodgson Lake. This mountain was mapped from trimetrogon air photography taken by the Ronne Antarctic Research Expedition, 1947–48, and from survey by the Falkland Islands Dependencies Survey, 1948–50. The name applied by the UK Antarctic Place-Names Committee because it resembles a fortified structure with a watchtower at the end of a wall.

== Geology ==
Citadel Bastion is one of a series of nunataks that provide outcrops of Cretaceous (Aptian–Albian) sedimentary rocks that comprise part of the 6.8 kilometer-thick Fossil Bluff Group, which underlies easternmost Alexander Island. These sedimentary rocks accumulated in shallow marine and terrestrial environments. The sedimentary rocks, which are exposed in Citadel Bastion and adjacent nunataks, consist of a 700 meter-thick sequence of laterally persistent beds of very fine to very coarse, rarely gravelly interbedded with occasional beds of sandstone (volcanic lithic arenite), mudstone, and conglomerate. At two horizons within these strata, beds of lithic and vitric tuff occur. well developed paleosols, leaf fossils, fossil wood, and fossil forests are widespread within this unit. The plant fossils consists mainly of coniferous plants (mainly podocarps). Fossils of Bennettitales, pteridophytes and liverworts, and to a lesser extent the angiosperms, are also common. Citadel Bastion is notable for bedrock outcrops that expose multiple fossil forests, which consist of upright standing trunks buried in place, and their associated paleosols.

The analysis of paleocurrent data from and the sedimentology of sedimentary rocks, which comprise Citadel Bastion and adjacent nunataks, found that these rocks accumulated as a large alluvial fan about 15 km in radius. This alluvial fan built seaward along the edge of a Cretaceous volcanic arc into marine waters occupying a forearc basin. This alluvial fan was built by braided rivers flowing in a south to southwesterly direction. The thickness of sediments that fill ancient channels indicate that the major channels of these rivers may have been ten meters or more deep. The floodplains between channels were stable enough, despite periodic deposition of coarse and fine sediment during floods, to allow the formation of soils and development of forests. The source area for the fluvial detritus was a volcanic arc, which now forms the Antarctic Peninsula, to the east. Within this volcanic arc, volcanic activity provided pyroclastic ash fall deposits to the area. Fossil plants found in these sedimentary rocks indicate that the palaeoclimate was warm and humid throughout the period of deposition despite their polar position.

== Quaternary Geology ==
Evidence shows that a thick ice sheet covered Citadel Bastion during the Last Glacial Maximum. Striated bedrock surfaces are found in the col on the south side of Citadel Bastion. The striations are best preserved at the edge of freshly exposed glacial tills. Striated bedrock has also been found on its slopes high as its summit. Numerous glacial erratics are also found in the col and on its slope all of the way up to and on its summit. These erratics are commonly striated and faceted. Some of them are bullet-shaped and aligned according to bedrock striations and ice flow within the former ice sheet. They are typically composed of sandstone. Other erratics are composed of conglomerate containing cobble-sized granitic clasts.

Cosmogenic beryllium-10 isotope dating of a few of the erratics indicate that they were exposed by the thinning of the ice sheet after the Last Glacial Maximum. The erratics within the col were exposed by thinning ice sheet about 13,500 years ago. Those at the summit of Citadel Bastion were exposed by thinning ice sheet about 10,200 years ago. These and other cosmogenic beryllium-10 isotope dates demonstrate a significant and progressive thinning and shrinkage of the ice sheet covering Alexandria Island from at least 22,000 years ago to about 10,000 years ago.

== See also ==
- Geology of the Antarctic Peninsula
