= Mount Stephenson =

Mountain on Alexander Island, Antarctica

- Location within Antarctica

Highest point
- Elevation: 2,987 m (9,800 ft)
- Prominence: 2,987 m (9,800 ft); Ranked 93rd
- Listing: Ultra
- Coordinates: 69°49′S 69°43′W

Geography
- Location: Alexander Island, Antarctica
- Parent range: Douglas Range

Mount Stephenson is a mountain in Antarctica. It is located within the central portion of the Douglas Range, standing at the heads of Toynbee Glacier and Sedgwick Glacier 13 kilometres (8.1 mi) west of George VI Sound, near the east coast of Alexander Island within the British Antarctic Territory. At an elevation of 2,987 metres (9,800 ft), Mount Stephenson is the highest mountain in the Douglas Range and the highest point on Alexander Island. Mount Egbert ranks second, standing at 2,895 m and lies 8 nautical miles (15 km; 9.2 mi) south-southeast of Mount Stephenson.

The mountain was probably first seen in 1909 by the French Antarctic Expedition under Charcot, but not recognized as part of the Douglas Range. It was first surveyed in 1936 by Stephenson, Fleming, and Bertram of the British Graham Land Expedition (BGLE) under Rymill. The east side of the mountain was resurveyed in 1948 by the Falkland Islands Dependencies Survey (FIDS) who named the feature for Alfred Stephenson, surveyor and leader of the BGLE party to George VI Sound in 1936. Another landform on Alexander Island happens to be named for Alfred Stephenson, Stephenson Nunatak.

== See also ==
- List of Ultras of Antarctica
- Mount Huckle
- Mount Ethelwulf
- Mount Spivey
