= Hampton Glacier =

Glacier in Antarctica

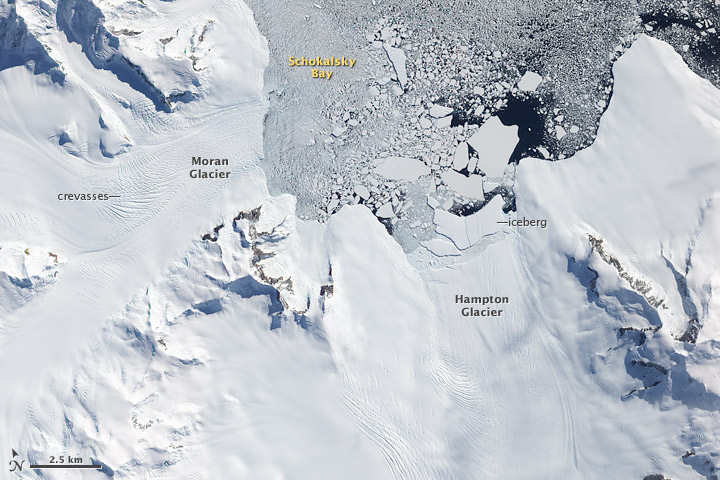
- Icebergs from the Hampton Glacier calving into the Schokalsky Bay.

- Location within Antarctica
- Location: Alexander Island, Antarctica
- Coordinates: 69°20′S 70°5′W
- Length: 25 nmi (46 km; 29 mi)
- Width: 5 nmi (9 km; 6 mi)
- Thickness: unknown
- Terminus: Schokalsky Bay
- Status: unknown

Hampton Glacier is a glacier lying between Mount Hahn and Mount Nicholas in the northeast part of Alexander Island, Antarctica. It is 25 nautical miles (46 km) long and 5 nautical miles (9 km) wide, and flows north-northeast along the west wall of the Douglas Range into Schokalsky Bay.

The glacier was first photographed from the air during a flight up it in 1937 by the British Graham Land Expedition (BGLE). Its mouth was surveyed in 1948 by the Falkland Islands Dependencies Survey and later named for Wilfred E. Hampton of the BGLE, who piloted the airplane that made the above-mentioned flight.

== See also ==
- Sullivan Glacier
- Sibelius Glacier
- Asafiev Glacier
