= Cape Brown =

Cape in Alexander Island, Antarctica

- Headland
- Coordinates: 69°16′S 69°45′W
- Location: Alexander Island
- Offshore water bodies: Bellingshausen Sea

Area
  - Total: Antarctica

Cape Brown is a prominent ice-covered cape 5.5 nautical miles (10 km) north-northeast of the summit of Mount Nicholas (Mount Nicholas being the northern extremity of the Douglas Range), marking the eastern side of the entrance to Schokalsky Bay on the northeast coast of Alexander Island in Antarctica. It was first seen from a distance by the French Antarctic Expedition under Jean-Baptiste Charcot in 1909, but charted as part of a small island. It was photographed from the air in 1937 by the British Graham Land Expedition under John Rymill, and later roughly mapped from the photos. It was surveyed from the ground in 1948 by Colin C. Brown, Falkland Islands Dependencies Survey surveyor at Stonington Island, 1948–49, for whom the cape is named.

== See also ==
- Cape Vostok
- Kosar Point
