= Mount McArthur (Antarctica) =

Mountain on Alexander Island, Antarctica

- Location within Antarctica

Highest point
- Elevation: 1,450 metres (4,760 ft)
- Coordinates: 71°11′S 70°20′W

Geography
- Location: Alexander Island, Antarctica
- Parent range: Walton Mountains

Mount McArthur is, at about 1,450 metres (4,760 ft), the highest peak in the Walton Mountains of southern Alexander Island, Antarctica. It was named by the UK Antarctic Place-Names Committee after Malcolm McArthur, a British Antarctic Survey geophysicist at Stonington Island, 1971–73, who worked in northern Alexander Island.

== See also ==
- List of Ultras of Antarctica
- Mount Athelstan
- Mount Schumann
- Mount Tyrrell
