= McLaughlin Cliffs =

The McLaughlin Cliffs (71°35′S 67°32′W) are abrupt rock cliffs that overlook George VI Sound between Armstrong Glacier and Conchie Glacier, in western Palmer Land, Antarctica. They were named by the Advisory Committee on Antarctic Names for Lieutenant Donald J. McLaughlin, Civil Engineer Corps, U.S. Navy Reserve, officer-in-charge of Palmer Station in 1970. The steep cliffs provide nesting sites for a colony of snow petrels (Pagodroma nivea).
