= Sandau Nunatak =

Coastal nunatak in Antarctica

Sandau Nunatak (71°42′S 67°12′W) is a coastal nunatak rising to about 400 m at the southwest end of Steeple Peaks, on the Rymill Coast, Palmer Land. Mapped by United States Geological Survey (USGS) from U.S. Navy aerial photographs, 1966–69. Named by Advisory Committee on Antarctic Names (US-ACAN) in 1976 after Charles L. Sandau, U.S. Navy, cook with the winter party at Palmer Station, 1973.

== See also ==
- Steeple Point
