= Bleset Rock =

Bleset Rock (73°39′S 3°57′W) is a rock lying 5 nautical miles (9 km) east-southeast of Enden Point, surmounting the ice divide between Utrakket Valley and Belgen Valley in the Kirwan Escarpment, Queen Maud Land. It was mapped by Norwegian cartographers from surveys and from air photos by the Norwegian–British–Swedish Antarctic Expedition (1949–52) and from additional air photos (1958–59), and named "Bleset".
