= Mount Schumann =

Mountain on Alexander Island, Antarctica

Coordinates: 71°38′S 73°42′W

Mount Schumann is a mountain rising to about 600 m (1,969 ft) southwest of the head of Brahms Inlet on the Beethoven Peninsula and lies 2 mi (3 km) northeast of Chopin Hill in the southwest portion of Alexander Island, Antarctica. The mountain was first mapped from air photos taken by the Ronne Antarctic Research Expedition in 1947–48, by Searle of the Falkland Islands Dependencies Survey in 1960. This feature was named by the United Kingdom Antarctic Place-Names Committee after Robert Schumann (1810–56), a German composer.

== See also ==
- Mount Grieg
- Mount Hahn
- Mount McArthur
