= Mount Lassell =

Mountain on Alexander Island, Antarctica

Mount Lassell (71°45′S 68°50′W) is a snow-covered peak, 1,000 metres (3,300 ft) high, overlooking the head of Neptune Glacier in the southeast part of Alexander Island, Antarctica. The peak appears to have been first sighted from the air by Lincoln Ellsworth on November 23, 1935, and roughly mapped from photos obtained on that flight by W.L.G. Joerg. It was remapped from air photos taken by the Ronne Antarctic Research Expedition, 1947–48, by D. Searle of the Falkland Islands Dependencies Survey in 1960. The peak was named by the UK Antarctic Place-Names Committee for William Lassell, an English astronomer who discovered Umbriel and Ariel, satellites of the planet Uranus, and the satellite Triton, orbiting the planet Neptune.

== See also ==
- Mount Bayonne
- Mount Cupola
- Mount Hahn
