= Mount Phoebe =

Mountain on Alexander Island, Antarctica

Mount Phoebe (71°47′S 68°47′W) is a mountain between the heads of Neptune Glacier and Saturn Glacier near the east coast of Alexander Island, Antarctica. The feature is situated at the junction of four radial ridges. The summit is a small mesa of conglomerate rising to about 300 m above the surrounding ice. First photographed by Lincoln Ellsworth, November 23, 1935, in the course of a trans-Antarctic flight and plotted from the air photos by W.L.G. Joerg. Named by United Kingdom Antarctic Place-Names Committee (UK-APC) from association with Saturn Glacier after Phoebe, one of the satellites of the planet Saturn, the sixth planet of the Solar System.

== See also ==
- Mount Ethelwulf
- Mount Kliment Ohridski
- Mount Schumann
