= Mount Ward (Antarctica) =

Mount Ward (71°36′S 66°57′W) is a mountain at the northeast end of Steeple Peaks, located south of Batterbee Mountains near George VI Sound in western Palmer Land. During a flight on December 23, 1947, by the Ronne Antarctic Research Expedition (RARE) (1947–48) a high peak was seen in the area southeast of Batterbee Mountains. It was named by F. Ronne after W.W. Ward of Beaumont, Texas, editor of the Beaumont Journal and a supporter of the expedition. No peak exists at the coordinates given by Ronne, but it is most likely that the feature here described was that seen by him.
