= Witches Cauldron =

Witches cauldron or variations may refer to:

== Places ==
- Witches Cauldron (Antarctica), a basin on Douglas Range, Alexander Island, Antarctica
- A crater at the top of Wizard Island in Crater Lake National Park, Oregon
- A basin at the base of Devils Thumb mountain on the Alaska–British Columbia border
- A mythological location from the saga of King Laurin

== Other uses ==
- Witches cauldron mushroom (Sarcosoma globosum), a species of fungus
- Witch's Cauldron, a 1985 videogame by Mikro-Gen
- Witch's Cauldron, a 1933 novel by Eden Phillpotts
- "The Witch's Cauldron", an episode of Sasami: Magical Girls Club
- A brand of beer by Moorhouse's Brewery
- A horse foaled by Brownhylda in 1926
- A feature in the horror comic book anthology series The Haunt of Fear

== See also ==
- Cauldron (disambiguation)
- Witch (disambiguation)
- The Black Cauldron (disambiguation)
- A Cauldron of Witches, a 1988 anthology of fairy tales
- Hexenkessel ('Witch's cauldron'), a 2003 album by Schandmaul
- Heksenketel ('Witch's cauldron'), a 1993 documentary film by The Tragically Hip
- Heksegryta Peaks ('Witch Cauldron' Peaks), a mountain group in Queen Maud Land, Antarctica
- Cast-iron cookware, including cast-iron cauldrons
