= Niznik Island =

Island in Palmer Land, Antarctica

- Location within Antarctica

Geography
- Location: Antarctica
- Coordinates: 69°47′S 68°30′W

Administration
- Administered under the Antarctic Treaty System

Demographics
- Population: Uninhabited

Niznik Island is an island in the north part of George VI Sound, lying opposite the mouth of Eureka Glacier near the coast of Palmer Land. Discovered by the Ronne Antarctic Research Expedition (RARE), 1947–48, under Ronne, who named it for the Theodore T. Niznik family of Baltimore, MD, contributors to the expedition. Niznik Island is part of the George VI Ice Shelf.

== See also ==
- List of Antarctic and sub-Antarctic islands
