= Rymill Coast =

- Coastal region
- Location on Antarctic Peninsula

- Location within Antarctica
- Coordinates: 71°00′S 67°30′W
- Location: Antarctic Peninsula

Rymill Coast is that portion of the west coast of Antarctic Peninsula between Cape Jeremy and Buttress Nunataks. It runs northward from English Coast and east of Alexander Island across George VI Sound, encompassing the Batterbee Mountains. It is joined in the north by Fallieres Coast, which runs along Marguerite Bay. It was named by the United Kingdom Antarctic Place-Names Committee (UK-APC) in 1985 after John Riddoch Rymill (1905–1968), Australian leader of the BGLE, 1934–1937.

The coast was partially photographed from the air by Lincoln Ellsworth, November 23, 1935. It was further photographed from the air and surveyed by British Graham Land Expedition (BGLE) in October–November 1936. The area was further surveyed by United States Antarctic Service (USAS), 1940, and by Falkland Islands Dependencies Survey (FIDS), 1948–1950. Additional aerial photography was done by the Ronne Antarctic Research Expedition (RARE), 1947, and U.S. Navy, 1966.

== See also ==
- Wright Spires
