= Tverregg Glacier =

Glacier in Antarctica

- Location of Queen Maud Land in Antarctica

- Location within Antarctica
- Location: Queen Maud Land
- Coordinates: 73°27′S 03°36′E
- Thickness: unknown
- Terminus: Kirwan Escarpment
- Status: unknown

Tverregg Glacier (73°27′S 3°36′W) is a glacier between Heksegryta Peaks and Tverregga Spur in the Kirwan Escarpment, Queen Maud Land. Mapped by Norwegian cartographers from surveys and air photos by Norwegian-British-Swedish Antarctic Expedition (NBSAE) (1949–52) and additional air photos (1958–59), and named Tverreggbreen (the transverse ridge glacier).

== See also ==
- List of glaciers in the Antarctic
- Glaciology
