= Lassell =

Lassell may refer to:

- Michael Lassell (born 1947), American writer and editor
- William Lassell (1799–1880), English astronomer. Objects named after him include
  - 2636 Lassell, a minor planet
  - Lassell (lunar crater)
  - Lassell (Martian crater)
  - Mount Lassell in Antarctica
