= Mount Calais =

Mountain in Antarctica

Mount Calias
- Location within Antarctica

Highest point
- Elevation: 2,360 m (7,740 ft)
- Prominence: 1,146 m (3,760 ft)
- Listing: Ribu
- Coordinates: 69°11′S 70°15′W

Geography
- Location: Alexander Island, Antarctica

Mount Calais (69°11′S 70°15′W) is a massive mountain, 2,360 metres (7,700 ft) high, at the northwest side of Schokalsky Bay in the northeast part of Alexander Island, Antarctica. It was first roughly surveyed in 1909 by the French Antarctic Expedition under Jean-Baptiste Charcot, who named it for the French city of Calais. The mountain was resurveyed in 1948 by the Falkland Islands Dependencies Survey. Mount Calais is the eighth-highest point of Alexander Island while Mount Stephenson remains the highest of all the peaks.

== See also ==
- Rouen Mountains
- Mount Cupola
- Mount Athelstan
