= Care Heights =

Topographic feature on Alexander Island, Antarctica

Care Heights (69°25′S 70°45′W) are a group of mostly ice-covered peaks and ridges, rising to about 1,500 metres (4,900 ft) north of Tufts Pass and forming the southern end of the Rouen Mountains, northern Alexander Island, Antarctica. The feature was photographed from the air by the Ronne Antarctic Research Expedition, 1947–48, and was mapped from these photographs by D. Searle of the Falkland Islands Dependencies Survey, 1960. Further delineation was made from U.S. Navy aerial photographs taken 1966–67 and from U.S. Landsat imagery taken January 1974. The heights were named by the UK Antarctic Place-Names Committee in 1977 after Bernard W. Care, British Antarctic Survey geologist, who worked at Stonington Island, 1973–75; Adelaide Island and north Alexander Island, 1975–76 and 1976–77.
