= Cauldron (disambiguation) =

A cauldron is a large metal pot for cooking.

Cauldron may also refer to:

== Music ==
- Cauldron (band), Canadian heavy metal band
- Cauldron (Fifty Foot Hose album), 1968
- Cauldron (Ruins album), 2008

== Gaming ==
- Cauldron (Shackled City), the primary setting in The Shackled City Adventure Path
- Cauldron (video game), a 1985 computer game
- Cauldron HQ, a computer game development studio located in Bratislava, Slovakia

== Books ==
- Cauldron (Larry Bond novel), a 1993 novel by Larry Bond
- Cauldron (Jack McDevitt novel), a 2007 science fiction novel by Jack McDevitt

== Military ==
- Cauldron (military term)
- The Cauldron, a WWII battlefield during the Battle of Gazala in North Africa
- Operation Cauldron, 1952 biological warfare experiment

== Other uses ==
- Caldera, a cauldron-like volcanic feature
- The Cauldron, a UK-based esoteric magazine
- Olympic cauldron

== See also ==
- Caldron (disambiguation)
- The Black Cauldron (disambiguation)
- Witches Cauldron (disambiguation)
