= Mount Grieg =

Mountain on Alexander Island, Antarctica

Coordinates: 71°34′S 73°10′W

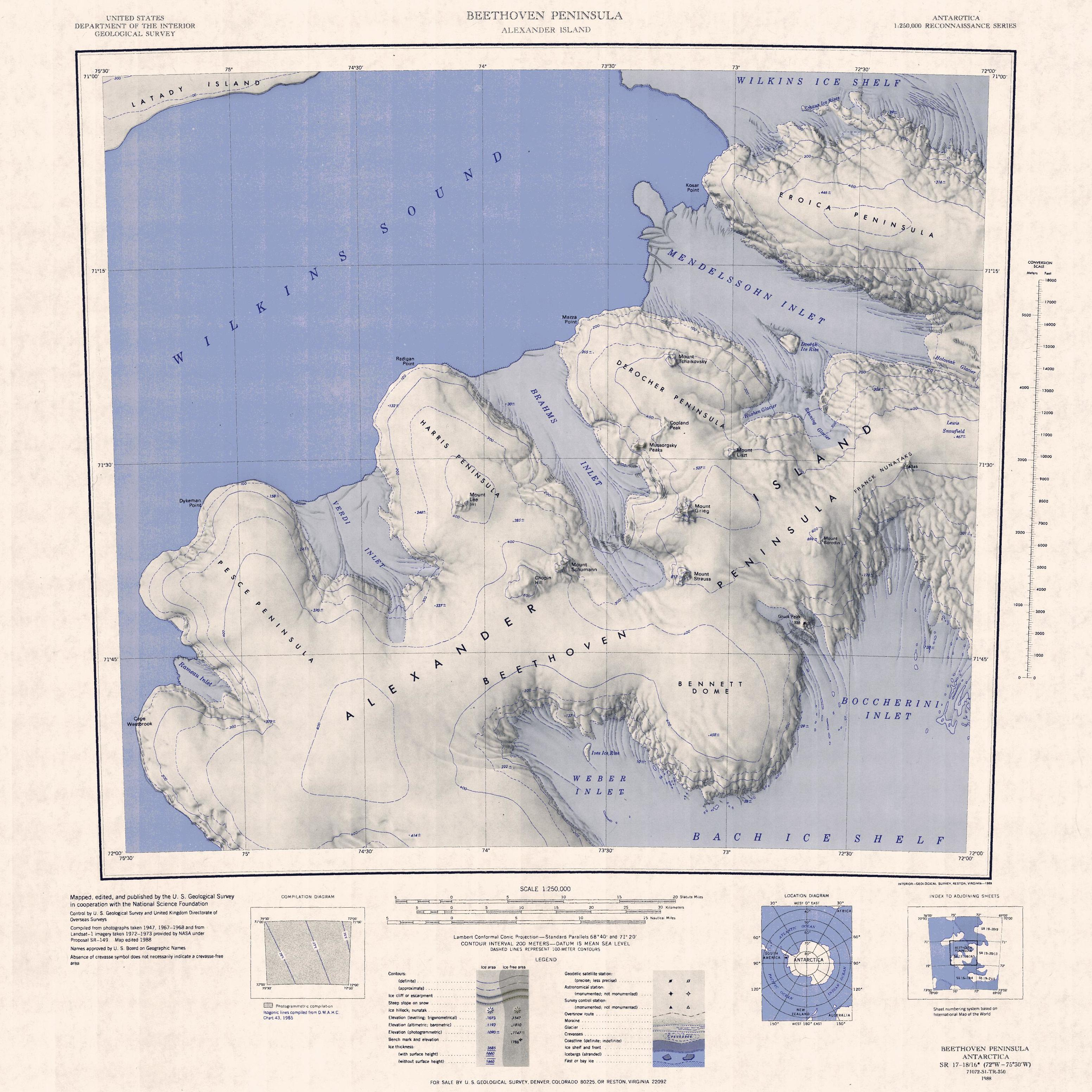
Topographic reconnaissance map of the Beethoven Peninsula area of Alexander Island from in Antarcticaincluding Mount Grieg

Mount Grieg is a snow-covered mountain, rising to about 800 metres (2,600 ft), with a rock-exposed west face, overlooking the southeast part of Brahms Inlet and is situated on the base of the Derocher Peninsula, on the north side of the Beethoven Peninsula in the southwest part of Alexander Island, Antarctica. A number of mountains in this vicinity first appear on maps by the Ronne Antarctic Research Expedition (RARE), 1947–48. This mountain, apparently one of these, was mapped from RARE air photos by Derek J.H. Searle of the Falkland Islands Dependencies Survey in 1960, and was remapped by the United States Geological Survey, 1988. It was named by the UK Antarctic Place-Names Committee after Edvard Grieg, the Norwegian composer.

== See also ==
- Mount Braun
- Mount Ethelwulf
- Mount Lassell
