= Steeple Point =

Steeple Point (71°43′S 67°19′W) is a low ice-covered point on the west coast of Palmer Land, approximately 2 nautical miles (3.7 km) west of Sandau Nunatak of the Steeple Peaks. The point was named by United Kingdom Antarctic Place-Names Committee (UK-APC) in association with the Steeple Peaks.
