= McArthur Glacier =

Glacier in Antarctica

McArthur Glacier (71°20′S 67°29′W) is a glacier between the Christie Peaks and Swine Hill, flowing west from Palmer Land, Antarctica, into George VI Sound. It was named by the UK Antarctic Place-Names Committee for Alistair H. McArthur, a British Antarctic Survey geophysicist at Stonington Island, 1967–68.
