= Chopin Hill =

Hill in Antarctica

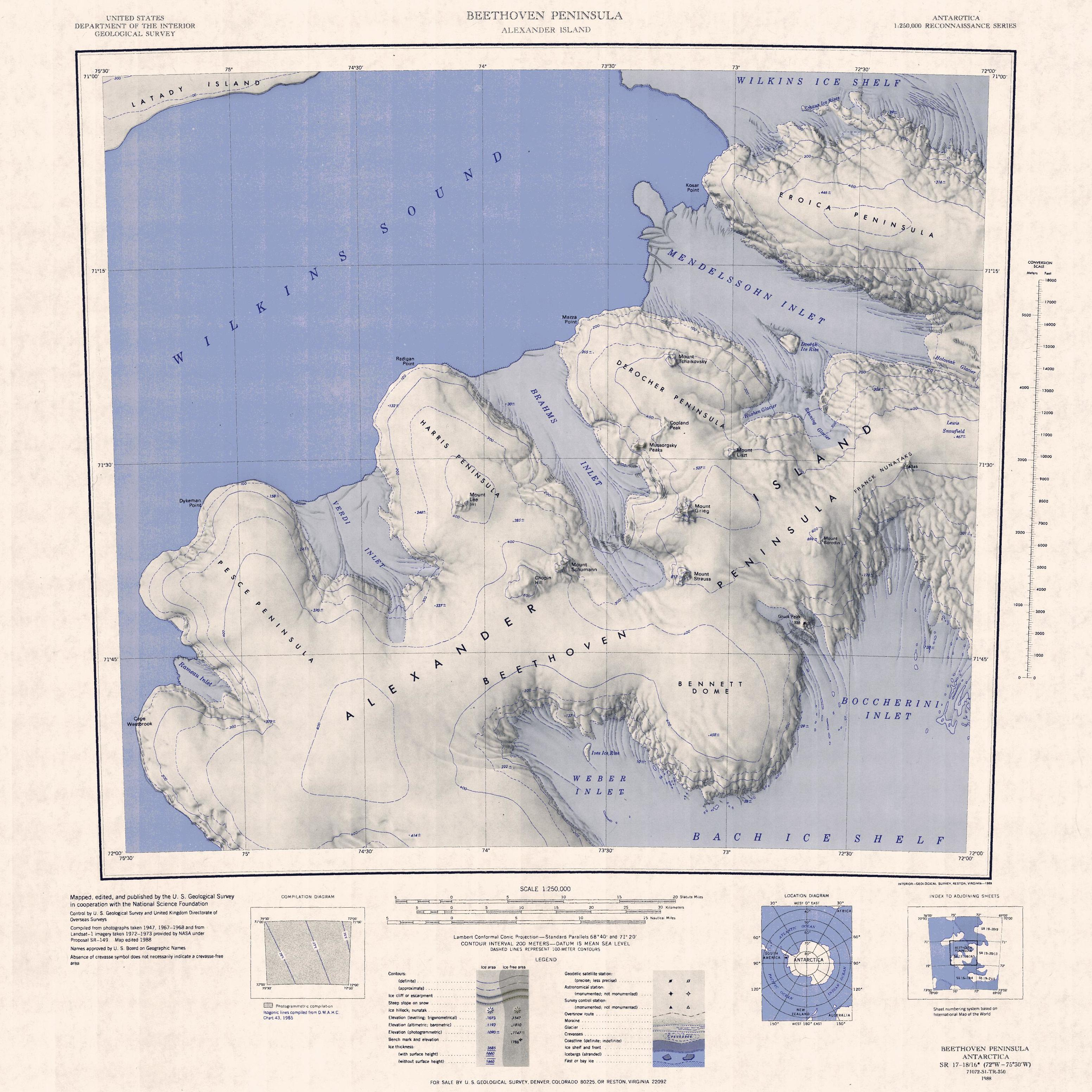
Topographic reconnaissance map of the Beethoven Peninsula area of Alexander Island in Antarctica including the Chopin Hill

Chopin Hill (71°40′S 73°49′W) is a low, snow-covered hill, about 600 metres (2,000 ft) high, lying 2 nautical miles (4 km) southwest of Mount Schumann lying on the base of Harris Peninsula, Beethoven Peninsula, southwest Alexander Island, Antarctica. It was first mapped, from air photos taken by the Ronne Antarctic Research Expedition, 1947–48, by D. Searle of the Falkland Islands Dependencies Survey in 1960, and named by the UK Antarctic Place-Names Committee after Frédéric Chopin, the Polish composer.
