= Mount Huckle =

Mountain on Alexander Island, Antarctica

Highest point
- Elevation: 2,500 metres (8,200 ft)
- Coordinates: 69°38′S 69°48′W

Geography
- Location: Alexander Island, Antarctica
- Parent range: Douglas Range

Mount Huckle is a mainly ice-covered mountain, 2,500 metres (8,200 ft) high, near the northern end of the Douglas Range in eastern Alexander Island, Antarctica. It rises 7 miles (11 km) south-southeast of Mount Spivey on the west side of Toynbee Glacier and is 9 miles (14 km) inland from George VI Sound. Mount Huckle is the fourth highest mountain of Alexander Island, proceeded by Mount Cupola and succeeded by Mount Paris in the nearby Rouen Mountains.

The mountain was possibly first seen in 1909 by the French Antarctic Expedition under Jean-Baptiste Charcot, but not recognized as part of Alexander Island. It was photographed from the air in 1936–37 by the British Graham Land Expedition under John Riddoch Rymill, and surveyed from the ground in 1948 by the Falkland Islands Dependencies Survey (FIDS).

== Etymology ==
The mountain was named after John Sydney Rodney Huckle, a general assistant at Stonington Island, who aided in the FIDS survey of the west side of George VI Sound in 1949.
