= Mount Tyrrell =

Mountain on Alexander Island, Antarctica

Mount Tyrrell (69°38′S 69°31′W) is an irregular mountain with two summits, the highest rising to a maximum height of 1,310 metres (4,300 ft), standing 3 nautical miles (6 km) inland from the east coast of Alexander Island, Antarctica, situated on the east side and near the mouth of Toynbee Glacier. The mountain was first photographed from the air in 1937 by the British Graham Land Expedition under Rymill. The mountain was surveyed in 1948 by the Falkland Islands Dependencies Survey and was named by them for George Walter Tyrrell, British geologist at the University of Glasgow, Scotland.

== See also ==
- Mount Bayonne
- Mount Ethelred
- Mount McArthur
