= Mount Cupola =

Mountain on Alexander Island, Antarctica

- Location within Antarctica

Highest point
- Elevation: 2,500 m (8,200 ft)
- Coordinates: 69°21′S 70°27′W

Geography
- Location: Alexander Island, Antarctica
- Parent range: Rouen Mountains

Mount Cupola (69°21′S 70°27′W) is a dome-shaped mountain, 2,500 metres (8,200 ft) high, marking the southeastern limit of the Rouen Mountains in the northern part of Alexander Island. It was first photographed from the air by the British Graham Land Expedition in 1937, and surveyed in 1948 by the Falkland Islands Dependencies Survey. The descriptive name was given by the UK Antarctic Place-Names Committee in 1960. Mount Cupola is the fifth-highest point of Alexander Island, succeeded by Mount Huckle in the Douglas Range.

== See also ==
- Mount Calais
- Mount Paris
- Mount Spivey
