= Mount Nicholas =

Mountain on Alexander Island, Antarctica

Coordinates: 69°22′S 69°50′W

Mount Nicholas is a 1,465-m mountain, standing 5.5 nautical miles (10 km) south-southwest of Cape Brown, and forming the northern limit of the Douglas Range on the east side of Alexander Island, Antarctica.

First seen and roughly charted from a distance in 1909 by the French Antarctic Expedition under Charcot, who named it Ile Nicolas II after Nicholas II, then reigning tsar of Russia. The French Antarctic Expedition maps showed it as an island, or possible headland, separated by a channel from Alexander Island. The coast in this vicinity was photographed from the air in 1937 by the British Graham Land Expedition (BGLE), but Charcot's name was altered by Rymill to "Cape Nicholas" and was applied in error to the seaward bulge of Mount Calais, about 13 nautical miles (24 km) to the north-northwest. Surveys in 1948 by the Falkland Islands Dependencies Survey (FIDS) identified the feature originally named "Ile Nicolas II" by Charcot as the mountain described.

The geology of the mountain contains both igneous and sedimentary rocks.

Mount Nicholas is within the area claimed by the United Kingdom as the British Antarctic Territory, while for Chile and Argentina it is part of the Antártica Chilena Province and the Tierra del Fuego Province respectively.

== See also ==
- Mount Calais
- Mount Cupola
- Mount Spivey
