= Wright Spires =

Wright Spires (69°30′S 68°31′W) is a three distinctive spires (aiguilles) rising to about 750 m at the east side of Chinook Pass on the Rymill Coast, Palmer Land. The feature was photographed from the air by the U.S. Navy, 1966, and was surveyed by British Antarctic Survey (BAS), 1970–73. Named by United Kingdom Antarctic Place-Names Committee (UK-APC) after Graham K. Wright, BAS general assistant, Halley Station, 1969–71, and Stonington Island, 1972–73, (Station Leader) 1974–75.
