= Witt Bluff =

Rock bluff on Alexander Island, Antarctica

Witt Bluff (71°16′S 68°27′W) is a rock bluff on the southwest side of Eros Glacier in eastern Alexander Island. The bluff is situated at the east end of a spur projecting from Planet Heights. Mapped by Directorate of Overseas Surveys from satellite imagery supplied by U.S. National Aeronautics and Space Administration in cooperation with U.S. Geological Survey. Named by United Kingdom Antarctic Place-Names Committee from association with nearby Eros Glacier after Carl G. Witt (1866–1946), the German astronomer who discovered Eros in 1898.
