= Utråkket Valley =

Valley in Queen Maud Land, Antarctica

Utråkket Valley (73°40′S 4°25′W) is an ice-filled valley between Skappelnabben Spur and Enden Point in the Kirwan Escarpment, Queen Maud Land. Mapped by Norwegian cartographers from surveys and air photos by Norwegian-British-Swedish Antarctic Expedition (NBSAE) (1949–52) and additional air photos (1958–59), and named Utrakket.
