= Scarab Bluff =

Coordinates: 71°20′S 68°16′W

Scarab Bluff is a bluff north of Giza Peak overlooking Fossil Bluff hut on the east coast of Alexander Island, Antarctica. A small plateau above the bluff contains a permanent melt pool which is a designated biological research site. Named by United Kingdom Antarctic Place-Names Committee in 1993 in keeping with other names in the vicinity after the sacred scarab beetle of the Egyptians in association with other nearby landforms named after Ancient Egyptian based themes.
