= Peel Cirque =

Glacial cirque in Alexander Island, Antarctica

Peel Cirque (69°7′S 70°31′W) is a glacial cirque lying above the southwest portion of the Roberts Ice Piedmont, situated in the northeast portion of Alexander Island, Antarctica. Photographed from the air by Ronne Antarctic Research Expedition (RARE) in 1947, mapped from air photographs by Falkland Islands Dependencies Survey (FIDS) in 1959, and surveyed by British Antarctic Survey (BAS), 1973–77. Named by United Kingdom Antarctic Place-Names Committee (UK-APC) in 1980 after Dr. David Anthony Peel, glaciologist with BAS from 1968, who worked on Alexander Island, in the years 1975 and 1976.
