= Batterbee Mountains =

Group of mountains in Palmer Land, Antarctica

Coordinates: 71°23′S 67°15′W

The Batterbee Mountains are a group of prominent mountains rising to 2,200 metres (7,200 ft), which forms part of the dissected edge of Dyer Plateau overlooking George VI Sound, on the west coast of Palmer Land. First seen and photographed from the air by Lincoln Ellsworth on 23 November 1935, they were charted from the ground in October 1936 by the British Graham Land Expedition (BGLE) under John Rymill, and named after Sir Harry Batterbee (1880–1976), Assistant Under-Secretary of State, Dominions Office, 1930–38, and Chairman of the Polar Committee in 1934, who gave help to the expedition.

== Geography ==
Unless otherwise noted, these features were first photographed by Ellsworth, charted by the BGLE under Rymill, and named by the United Kingdom Antarctic Place-Names Committee (UK-APC).

The Batterbee Mountain range is split along its north–south axis by the Rowley Corridor, a pass which extends from Ryder Glacier to Conchie Glacier and separates the inland peaks such as Mount Ness and Mount Bagshawe from the coastal peaks along the western edge of Palmer Land and George VI Sound. It was named for David N. Rowley, senior pilot with the British Antarctic Survey (BAS), 1969–74.

== Coastal peaks ==
The northernmost feature of the Batterbee Mountains are the Christie Peaks, a conspicuous group of sharp peaks located immediately south of the terminus of Ryder Glacier. The group was named for Timothy J.C. Christie, a British Antarctic Survey (BAS) surveyor at Stonington Island, 1970–71. To the south along the coast is a group called the Tindley Peaks, rising to about 2,490 ft (760 m) between the Christie Peaks and McArthur Glacier. They were named for Roger C. Tindley, BAS general assistant and mechanic at Fossil Bluff, 1973–75. At the west side of the Tindley Peaks is Horse Bluff, surveyed by the British Antarctic Survey from 1970, and so named from a distinctive feature on the bluff resembling a horse's head. South of the Tindley Peaks is McArthur Glacier.

Swine Hill is the southernmost of two rugged, rocky knolls, 1,800 ft (550 m) high, which stand 10 nmi (19 km) west-northwest of the summit of Mount Bagshawe on the west coast of Palmer Land. The hill overlooks Gadarene Lake, a meltwater lake 1 nmi (2 km) long in the ice shelf of George VI Sound. Its eastern shore borders the exposed rocks of the west coast of Palmer Land. In summer a considerable volume of water enters the lake from the ravine immediately north of Swine Hill. The hill and the lake were surveyed in 1948 by the Falkland Islands Dependencies Survey (FIDS), who erected a cairn on the summit. The names of these features comes from an incident where the expedition's sled dogs attempted to throw themselves and their sledge down the steep ice slopes into the water, which reminded the explorers of the Biblical Gadarene swine.

== Inland peaks ==
Further inland to the east, but not far south of the Christie Peaks, is Mount Unicorn, named after the constellation of Monoceros (The Unicorn). About 6 nmi (11 km) southeast is Mount Ness, which stands 6,200 ft (1,890 m) high. It was named for Mrs. Patrick Ness, a donor to the BGLE. Mount Cadbury is the easternmost of the Batterbee Mountains, 5,900 ft (1,800 m) high, standing east-southeast of Mount Ness and 18 nmi (33 km) inland from George VI Sound. It was named for Mrs. Henry Tyler Cadbury, a fundraiser for the BGLE. Pyxis Ridge, a narrow ridge of nunataks separated by passes, is located 5 nmi (9.3 km) north-northwest of Mount Cadbury, projecting into the south side of Ryder Glacier. It was named by UK-APC after the constellation of Pyxis. The Puppis Pikes sit outside the Batterbee Mountains, 7 nmi (13 km) northeast from Mount Cadbury.

Mount Bagshawe is the tallest of the Batterbee Mountains at 7,200 ft (2,200 m) high. It stands 8 nmi (15 km; 9.2 mi) inland from George VI Sound. It was first photographed with the rest of the range by Ellsworth, and was mapped from these photographs by W.L.G. Joerg. It was named by UK-APC in 1954 for Sir Arthur W.G. Bagshawe. A rock nunatak called Thomson Rock sits 3 nmi (5.6 km) east of Mount Bagshawe, along the eastern edge of the range. It was named for Michael R.A. Thomson, British Antarctic Survey (BAS) geologist.

4 nmi (7 km) south of Mount Bagshawe, between Armstrong Glacier and Conchie Glacier, is a group of smaller peaks called the Butler Peaks, named by UK-APC after Peter F. Butler, a British Antarctic Survey geophysicist at Stonington Island.
