= Tverreggtelen Hill =

Tverreggtelen Hill (73°24′S 3°33′W) is a hill immediately southeast of Tverregga Spur in the Kirwan Escarpment, Queen Maud Land. Mapped by Norwegian cartographers from surveys and air photos by Norwegian-British-Swedish Antarctic Expedition (NBSAE) (1949–52) and additional air photos (1958–59), and named in association with Tverregga Spur.
