= Walton Mountains =

Mountain group on Alexander Island, Antarctica

- Location within Antarctica

Highest point
- Elevation: 1,450 m (4,760 ft)
- Parent peak: Mount McArthur
- Coordinates: 71°12′S 70°20′W

Geography
- Location: Alexander Island, Antarctica

Walton Mountains is an isolated chain of three predominantly snow-covered mountain masses, rising to about 1,450 m at Mount McArthur, extending south from Schubert Inlet for 25 miles (40 km) in central Alexander Island, Antarctica. The mountains were first sighted from the air by Lincoln Ellsworth on November 23, 1935, and roughly mapped from photos obtained on that flight by W.L.G. Joerg. Resighted from the air by the United States Antarctic Service in 1940, and in 1947 by the Ronne Antarctic Research Expedition under Ronne. Ronne named the mountains after Lieutenant Colonel R.C. Walton, United States Marine Corps, of the Office of Naval Research, who was instrumental in obtaining the loan of a ship from the Navy and in securing Navy assistance for the Ronne expedition.

== See also ==
- Havre Mountains
- Lassus Mountains
- Rouen Mountains
