= Mount Bayonne =

Mountain on Alexander Island, Antarctica

Highest point
- Elevation: 1,500 m (4,900 ft)
- Coordinates: 68°55′S 71°03′W

Geography
- Location: West Antarctica
- Parent range: Rouen Mountains

Mount Bayonne (68°55′S 71°03′W) is a mountain, 1,500 m, forming the north extremity of the Rouen Mountains in Alexander Island, Antarctica. The mountain lies immediately north of Les Dents and Mount Paris. First mapped by the French Antarctic Expedition, 1908–10, under Jean-Baptiste Charcot, who named it for the French city. Resighted from the air by the British Graham Land Expedition (BGLE) in 1936. Remapped from air photos taken by the Ronne Antarctic Research Expedition (RARE), 1947–48, by Searle of the Falkland Islands Dependencies Survey (FIDS) in 1960.

== See also ==
- Beagle Peak
- Mount Huckle
- Mount Phoebe
