= Puppis Pikes =

Puppis Pikes (71°16′S 66°24′W) is a loosely defined group of pointed nunataks and smaller outcrops running roughly east–west, located 7 nautical miles (13 km) northeast of Mount Cadbury in Palmer Land. Named by United Kingdom Antarctic Place-Names Committee (UK-APC) after the constellation of Puppis.
