= Caldron (disambiguation) =

A caldron is a large metal pot for cooking.

Caldron may also refer to:

- Caldron (sex club)
- Caldron Falls (North Yorkshire), West Burton, England
- Caldron Linn (Idaho), a waterfall
- Caldron Peak, Canada
- Caldron (heraldry), a heraldic charge

== See also ==
- Cauldron (disambiguation)
