= Enden Point =

Landform in Queen Maud Land, Antarctica

Enden Point (73°37′S 4°14′W) is a rock point at the southwest side of Belgen Valley, in the Kirwan Escarpment of Queen Maud Land. It was mapped by Norwegian cartographers from surveys and air photos by the Norwegian–British–Swedish Antarctic Expedition (1949–1952), led by John Schjelderup Giæver, and from additional air photos (1958–59), and named "Enden" (the end).

Bleset Rock is a rock lying 5 nautical miles (9 km) east-southeast of Enden Point.
