= Belgen Valley =

Valley in Queen Maud Land, Antarctica

Belgen Valley (73°35′S 4°0′W) is a broad, ice-filled valley between Enden Point and Heksegryta Peaks in the Kirwan Escarpment, Queen Maud Land. It was mapped by Norwegian cartographers from surveys and from air photos by the Norwegian-British-Swedish Antarctic Expedition (1949–52) and from additional air photos (1958–59), and named "Belgen" (the "shell").
