= The Black Cauldron =

The Black Cauldron may refer to:

- The Black Cauldron, a 1949 novel by William Heinesen
- The Black Cauldron (novel), a 1965 Chronicles of Prydain novel by Lloyd Alexander
- The Black Cauldron (film), a 1985 Disney animated film adaptation of the Chronicles of Prydain
- The Black Cauldron (video game), a 1985 adventure game based on the film

== See also ==
- Witches Cauldron (disambiguation)
- Cast-iron cookware, including cast-iron cauldrons
