= Heksegryta Peaks =

Mountain in Antarctica

Heksegryta Peaks (73°31′S 3°48′W) are a group of peaks rising between Belgen Valley and Tverregg Glacier, in the Kirwan Escarpment of Queen Maud Land, Antarctica. They were mapped by Norwegian cartographers from surveys and air photos by the Norwegian–British–Swedish Antarctic Expedition (1949–52) and from additional air photos (1958–59), and named Hekesegryta (the witch's cauldron).
