= Tverregga Spur =

Ridge of Queen Maud Land, Antarctica

Tverregga Spur (73°23′S 3°36′W) is a spur 3 nautical miles (6 km) west of Mount Hallgren, in the Kirwan Escarpment of Queen Maud Land. Mapped by Norwegian cartographers from surveys and air photos by Norwegian-British-Swedish Antarctic Expedition (NBSAE) (1949–52) and additional air photos (1958–59), and named Tverregga (the transverse ridge).

== See also ==
- Tverreggtelen Hill
