= Mount Spivey =

Mountain on Alexander Island, Antarctica

Mount Spivey (69°31′S 69°50′W) is a flat-topped, mainly ice-covered mountain, rising to about 2,135 m, standing on the west side of Toynbee Glacier and 9 nautical miles (17 km) south of Mount Nicholas. It is situated near the northern extremity of the Douglas Range of the northeast portion of Alexander Island, Antarctica.

First photographed from the air in 1937 by the British Graham Land Expedition under Rymill, Mount Spivey was later surveyed from the ground in 1948 by the Falkland Islands Dependencies Survey and named for Robert E. Spivey, general assistant at Stonington Island, who took part as a member in the Falkland Islands Dependencies Survey sledge journey to George VI Sound in 1949.

== See also ==
- Mount Huckle
- Mount Sanderson
- Mount Stephenson
