= Conchie Glacier =

Glacier in Antarctica

Conchie Glacier (71°36′S 67°15′W) is a glacier on the west coast of Palmer Land which flows southwest into George VI Sound between the Batterbee Mountains and the Steeple Peaks. It was named by the UK Antarctic Place-Names Committee for Flight-Lieutenant Bertie J. Conchie, Royal Air Force, pilot with the British Antarctic Survey from 1969 to 1975.
