= Geology of the Antarctic Peninsula =

The Antarctic Peninsula, roughly 1,000 kilometres (650 mi) south of South America, is the northernmost portion of the continent of Antarctica. Like the associated Andes, the Antarctic Peninsula is an excellent example of ocean-continent collision resulting in subduction. The peninsula has experienced continuous subduction for over 200 million years, but changes in continental configurations during the amalgamation and breakup of continents have changed the orientation of the peninsula itself, as well as the underlying volcanic rocks associated with the subduction zone.

== Tectonic evolution and geology of the Antarctic Peninsula ==
The geology of the Antarctic Peninsula occurred in three stages:

1. Pre-subduction stage of marginal basin deposition, later separated by the Gondwanian orogeny during the Permian-Late Triassic
2. The middle subduction phase, characterized by the formation of the Antarctic Peninsula (inner) and South Shetland Islands (outer) magmatic arcs, during the middle Jurassic-Miocene.
3. The late subduction phase, when the opening of the Bransfield Rift and back-arc basins occur. This is followed by contemporaneous terrestrial and submarine volcanic activity, from the Oligocene-present day.

=== Pre-subduction history ===
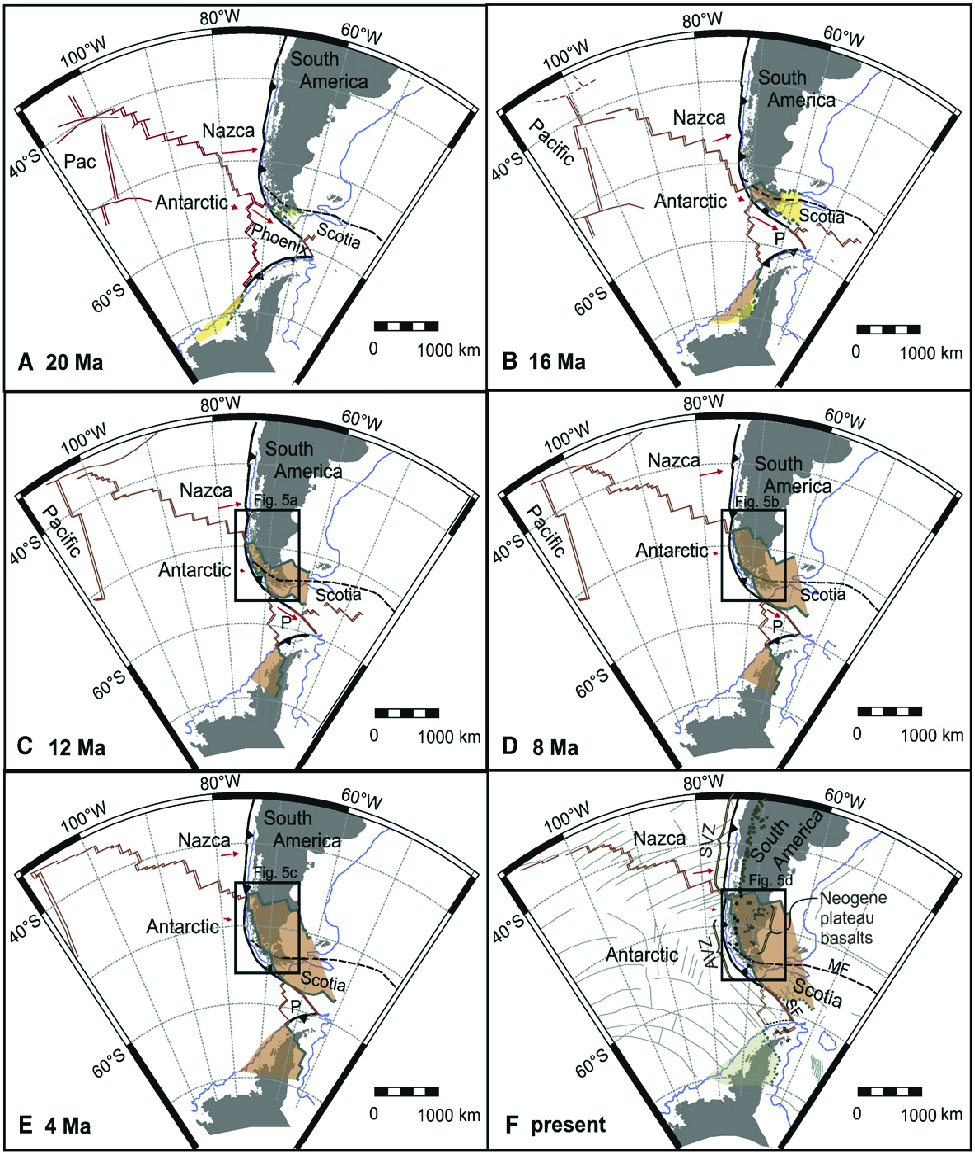
Antarctic Peninsula previous plate configurations.

As Gondwana broke apart, the Antarctic Peninsula started to take on its modern shape. Roughly 220 million years ago, the continents of Antarctica, South America, and Africa rifted apart. This rifting created low relief basins which allowed for the transport of sediments and subsequent deposition of sedimentary rocks. These rocks, the oldest on the peninsula, belong to the Trinity Peninsula Group (TPG), which are mostly composed of siliciclastic turbidite deposits, ~1200–3000 m thick, deposited in a marginal marine basin. Unfortunately their age is poorly constrained, but they are most likely from the upper Permian and Triassic. The clastic component of these sediments was derived from the weathering, erosion, and subsequent transportation of metamorphic, igneous and sedimentary material from Gondwana, then to the northeast.

==== Gondwanian orogeny ====
During this time the Trinity Peninsula Group sediments were folded and slightly metamorphosed, particularly at the peninsula's northernmost point. Retroarc thrusting also occurred at this time. Both events were most likely caused by the incipient subduction of the south-east Pacific Plate under the Gondwana supercontinent. As a result, marginal basin clastics from the Pacific plate's oceanic basement were obducted onto the continental margin of Gondwana, composed of older crystalline basement.

=== Middle subduction phase ===
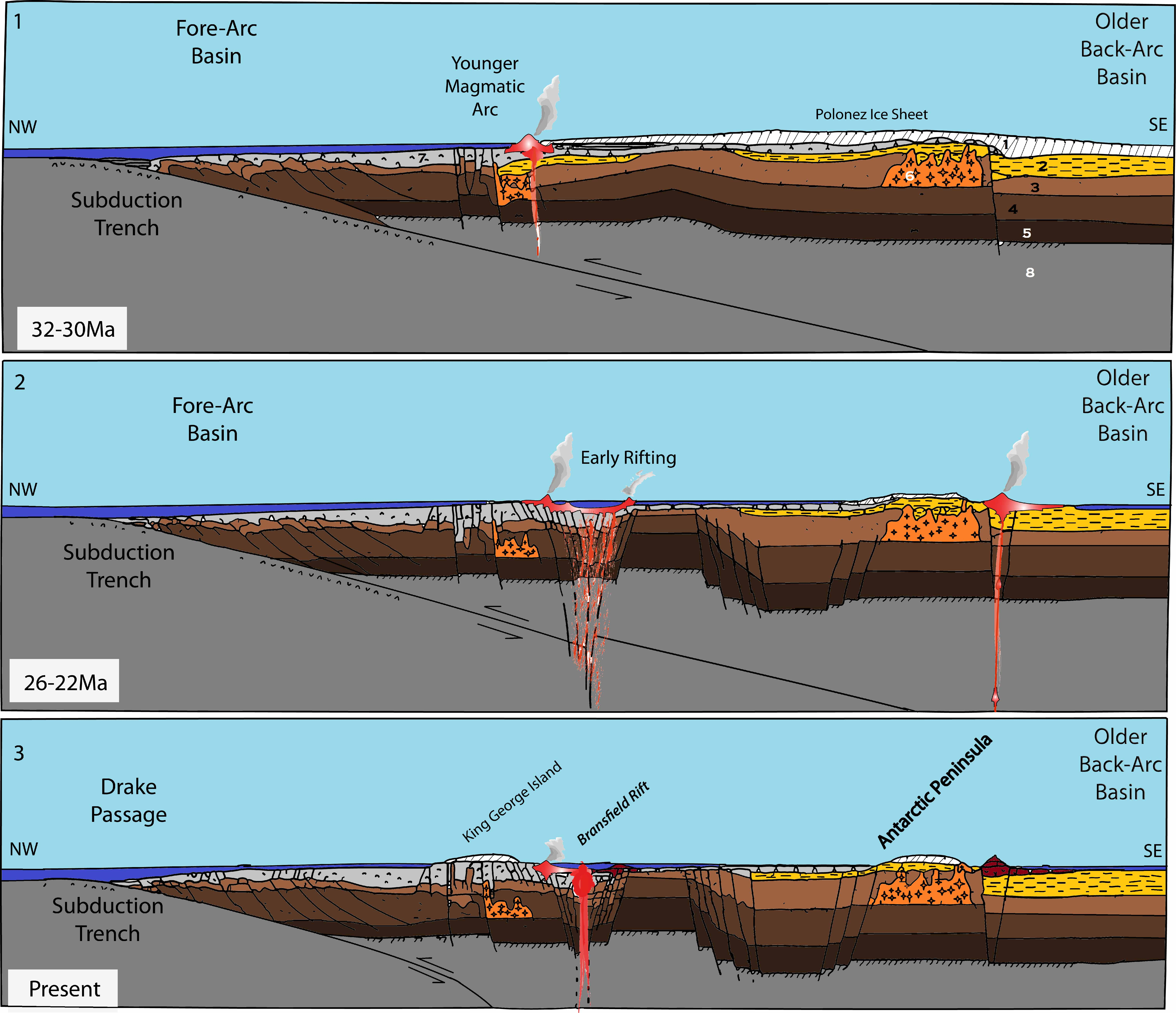
Generalized cross section of the Antarctic-Phoenix subduction zone. (1) ice sheet, (2) Mesozoic marine deposits, (3) crystalline substratum, (4) crystalline substratum, (5) lower crust, (6) Cretaceous Andean pluton, (7) stratiform volcanics, (8) upper mantle

==== Inner magmatic arc ====
The inner magmatic arc, despite being older than the outer magmatic arc, has higher topographic relief. It forms the mainland of the Antarctic Peninsula. The creation of the inner magmatic arc is characterized by terrestrial clastic deposition and the early stages of acidic volcanism and plutonism. The Mesozoic clastic sequence (Number 2-Figure 2) consists of the Mount Flora Formation (MFF), which is a 270 m thick package of plant-bearing coarse sedimentary breccias and conglomerates, with a limited amount of interbedded sandstones and shales. The clastic beds overlay the TPG sediments, and are separated by angular unconformities. Overlying the MFF clastic sequence are the acidic volcanics of the Kenny Glacier Formation (KGF). This volcanic sequence is a 215 m thick group of rhyolite-dacite lavas, ignimbrites, tuffs, and agglomerates. The acidic dikes and sills which intrude the MFF and TPG sediments may be due to the KGF stratovolcano. The acidic volcanism that created the KGF sequence is associated with plutonic intrusions during the Middle Jurassic-Early Cretaceous in the northern Antarctic Peninsula. These plutonic intrusions could have been caused by the doming and rifting in the continental margin of Gondwana at the onset of oceanic slab subduction.

==== Outer magmatic arc ====
The outer magmatic arc, of which the South Shetland Islands are a part, is a westward migration of the inner magmatic arc. Similar to the inner magmatic arc, the outer is composed of subduction-related acidic volcanism. A study on Alexander Island that focused on the conditions required for the generation of andesitic lavas postulated that the source for the andesitic lavas could be either the development of a slab-window due to the subduction of a spreading ridge or the breakup of the subducted slab beneath the fore-arc basin. The South Shetland Islands are bisected by two systems of strike-slip faults. The older system, which is parallel with the island arc, is characterized by right-lateral faults, and was active on King George Island during most of the Tertiary. The younger system of faults, also a series of strike-slip faults, displaced the older system and formed transverse to the island arc. Movement of the fault activity was caused by the counterclockwise rotation of the Antarctic Continent with respect to the subduction zone.

=== Late subduction phase, opening of the Bransfield Rift ===
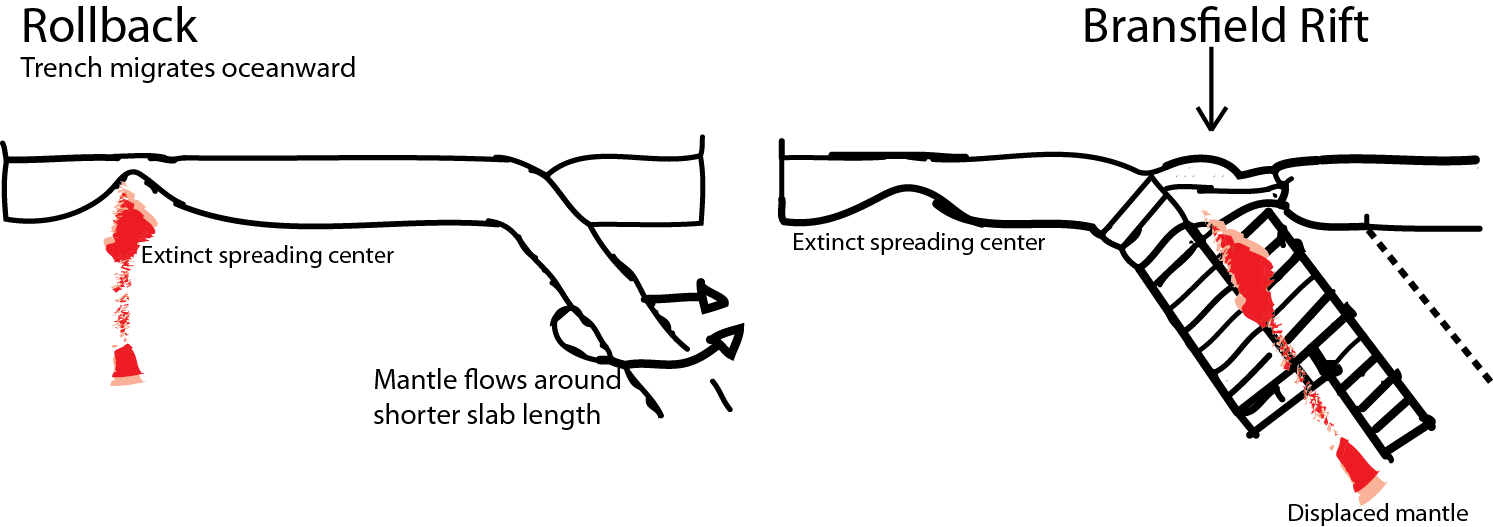
Development of the Bransfield Rift, depicting trench rollback and upwelling of displaced mantle material.

The last and most recent stage in the evolution of the Antarctic Peninsula subduction zone is the opening of the Bransfield Rift, creating the Bransfield back-arc basin from the Oligocene to the present day. This basin separates the inner, older magmatic arc (mainland Antarctic Peninsula) from the outer, younger magmatic arc (South Shetland Islands). Alkaline and tholeiitic volcanic activity is associated with this rifting event.

The trenchward migration of the spreading center is attributed to the subduction of the Phoenix Plate under the Antarctic Plate. Slab rollback and South Shetland Trench oceanward retreat have led to extensional forces acting on the leading edge of the overriding plate. The Bransfield Strait, the result of this extension, is presumed to be four million years old or less; magnetic anomalies created by the formation of new basaltic crust and aligned with the axis of the Bransfield Rift indicate that the newly formed oceanic crust in the Bransfield Strait is roughly 1.3 million years old. Unfortunately the deposition of sediments and extensive intrusions into the rift render computer modeling unreliable. Isolated occurrences of terrestrial volcanic activity are present, and are predominantly alkaline to tholeiitic in composition.

== See also ==
- Gerlache Strait geology
- Chon Aike Formation
- Deception Island geology
- Adelaide Island geology
- Alexander Island geology
- Tectonic evolution of Patagonia
