= Armstrong Glacier =

Glacier in Antarctica

- Location within Antarctic Peninsula Location within Antarctica
- Location: Palmer Land
- Coordinates: 71°31′S 67°30′W
- Thickness: unknown
- Terminus: George VI Sound
- Status: unknown

Armstrong Glacier (71°31′S 67°30′W) is a glacier flowing from the south side of Mount Bagshawe westward into George VI Sound. It provides the only known safe route for mechanical vehicles from George VI Sound to the Palmer Land plateau. It was named by the United Kingdom Antarctic Place-Names Committee for Edward B. Armstrong, British Antarctic Survey surveyor at Stonington Island, 1964–65.

== See also ==
- List of glaciers in the Antarctic
- Glaciology
