= Steeple Peaks =

Group of five summits in Antarctica

Steeple Peaks (71°38′S 67°3′W) is a line of five distinct peaks, the northeasternmost being Mount Ward, located on the western edge of Palmer Land, south of Conchie Glacier. The area was named by United Kingdom Antarctic Place-Names Committee (UK-APC) because of a number of steeple-like features visible among the peaks.
