= Rouen Mountains =

Mountain range in Antarctica

- Location within Antarctica

Highest point
- Elevation: 2,800 m (9,200 ft)
- Coordinates: 69°10′S 70°53′W

Geography
- Location: Alexander Island, Antarctica

The Rouen Mountains (69°10′S 70°53′W) are a prominent mountain range, reaching to about 2,800 m and extending 35 miles (60 km) NW-SE from Mount Bayonne to Care Heights and Mount Cupola, in north Alexander Island, Antarctica. This mountain range is known to occupy some of the highest peaks of Alexander Island, much like the nearby Douglas Range. Mount Paris is the highest point of the Rouen Mountains, exceeding 2,800 m approximately.

The mountains were first mapped by the French Antarctic Expedition of 1908–10, under J. B. Charcot and named by him after the French city of Rouen. Charcot indicated a break in these mountains south of Mount Paris, but air photos taken by the Ronne Antarctic Research Expedition of 1947–48, as interpreted by Searle of the Falkland Islands Dependencies Survey (FIDS) indicate that the mountains are continuous southeast to Mount Cupola. They were partly surveyed by FIDS in 1948 and further delineated from U.S. satellite imagery of January 1974 and February 1975.

== See also ==
- Havre Mountains
- Lassus Mountains
- Walton Mountains
