= Mount Egbert =

Mountain on Alexander Island, Antarctica

- Location within Antarctica

Highest point
- Elevation: 2,895 m (9,498 ft)
- Coordinates: 69°57′S 69°37′W

Geography
- Location: Alexander Island, Antarctica
- Parent range: Douglas Range

Mount Egbert (69°57′S 69°37′W) is a mainly ice-covered mountain, 2,895 metres (9,500 ft) high, 8 nautical miles (15 km) south-southeast of Mount Stephenson in the Douglas Range of Alexander Island, Antarctica. It was possibly first seen in 1909 by the French Antarctic Expedition under Jean-Baptiste Charcot, but was not recognized as a part of Alexander Island. It was surveyed in 1936 by the British Graham Land Expedition under John Rymill, then resurveyed in 1948 by the Falkland Islands Dependencies Survey, who named the mountain for Egbert, a ninth-century Saxon king of England. Mount Egbert is the second highest peak of Alexander Island, while Mount Stephenson remains the highest point.
