= Mount Paris =

Mountain on Alexander Island, Antarctica

- Location within Antarctica

Highest point
- Elevation: 2,800 m (9,200 ft)
- Prominence: 1,930 m (6,330 ft)
- Coordinates: 68°59′S 70°50′W

Geography
- Location: Alexander Island, Antarctica
- Parent range: Rouen Mountains

Mount Paris (68°59′S 70°50′W) is a conspicuous mountain, about 2,800 m, 4 nautical miles (7 km) southeast of Mount Bayonne situated in the northern portion of Alexander Island, Antarctica.

== History ==
The mountain was first mapped by the French Antarctic Expedition, 1908–10, under Charcot, who named it for the French capital, Paris. The mountain was resighted in 1936 by the British Graham Land Expedition (BGLE) and charted as mountains, but subsequent study of air photos taken by the Ronne Antarctic Research Expedition (RARE), 1947–48, has caused the name to be restricted to this single mountain. Mount Paris is the third-highest peak of Alexander Island, while Mount Egbert remains second standing at 2,850 m in height.
