= Mount Athelstan =

Mountain on Alexander Island, Antarctica

- Location within Antarctica

Highest point
- Elevation: 1,615 m (5,299 ft)
- Coordinates: 70°10′S 69°16′W

Geography
- Location: Alexander Island, Antarctica
- Parent range: Douglas Range

Mount Athelstan is a prominent, partly ice-covered mountain, 1,615 metres (5,300 ft) high, at the north side of Trench Glacier on a spur which extends east from Douglas Range on the east coast of Alexander Island, Antarctica. The east side of Douglas Range was first photographed from the air on 23 November 1935, by Lincoln Ellsworth, and Mount Athelstan was mapped from the photos by W.L.G. Joerg. It was roughly surveyed in 1936 by the British Graham Land Expedition under John Riddoch Rymill, and re-surveyed in 1948 and 1949 by the Falkland Islands Dependencies Survey, and named by them for Æthelstan, Saxon king of England, 924–937.
