= George VI Ice Shelf =

Ice shelf in Antarctica

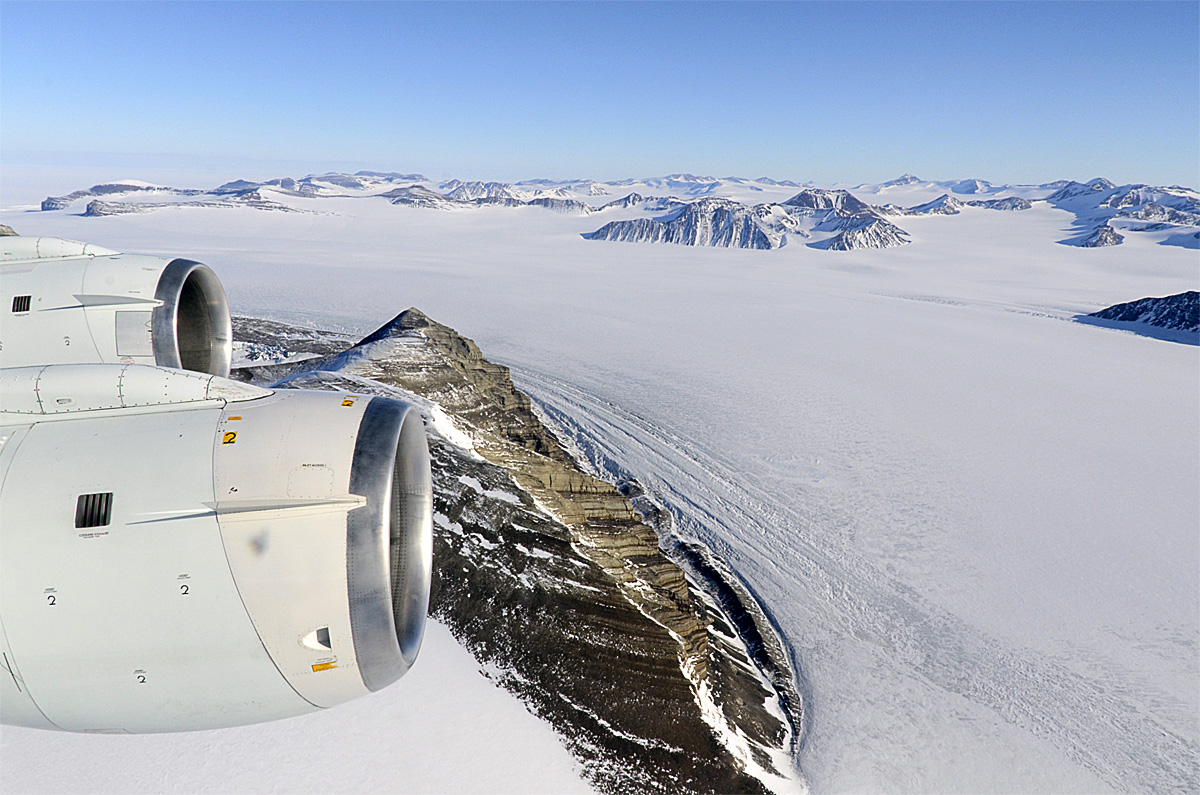
George VI Ice Shelf

The George VI Ice Shelf (71°45′S 68°00′W) is an extensive ice shelf that occupies George VI Sound which separates Alexander Island from Palmer Land in Antarctica. The ice shelf extends from Ronne Entrance, at the southwest end of the sound, to Niznik Island, about 30 nautical miles (56 km) south of the north entrance between Cape Brown and Cape Jeremy. It was named by the UK Antarctic Place-Names Committee in association with George VI Sound.

== History ==
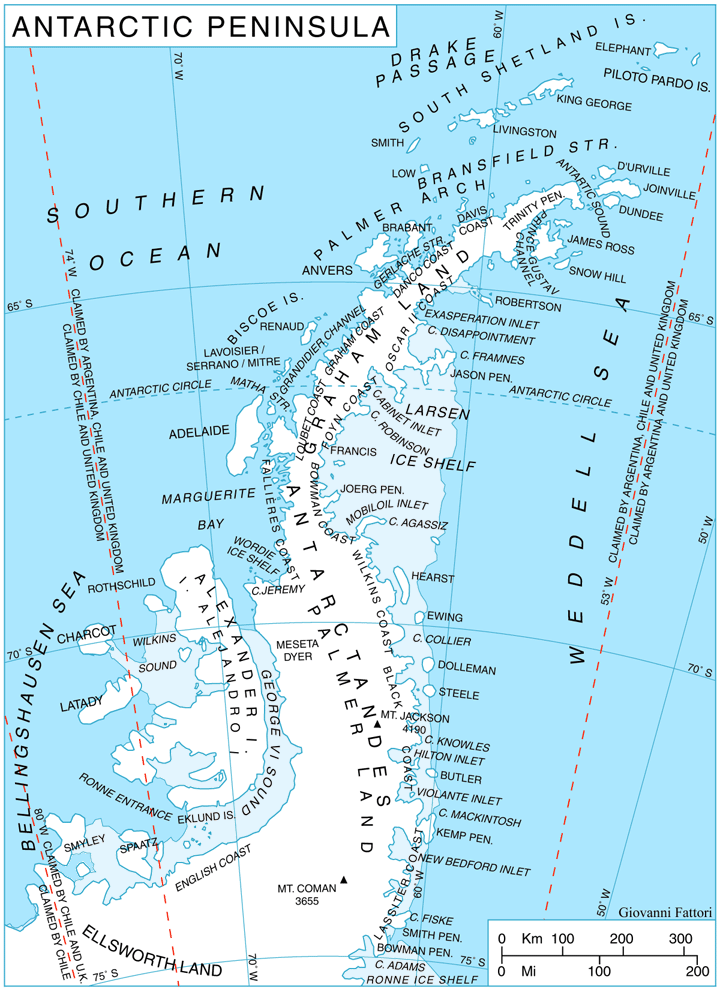
Area map.

Location in Antarctica

The George VI shelf ice and George VI Strait were discovered in 1935 during a flight by Lincoln Ellsworth.

The area was explored by the British Graham Land Expedition in 1936–1937 led by John Riddoch Rymill and in 1940 by the American USAS.

In 1975, the name was determined by the American "Advisory Committee on Antarctic Names" (US-ACAN, a unit of the United States Geological Survey) and the British "Antarctic Place-Names Committee" (UK-APC, a unit of the Foreign and Commonwealth Office).
