= Douglas Range =

Mountain range on Alexander Island, Antarctica

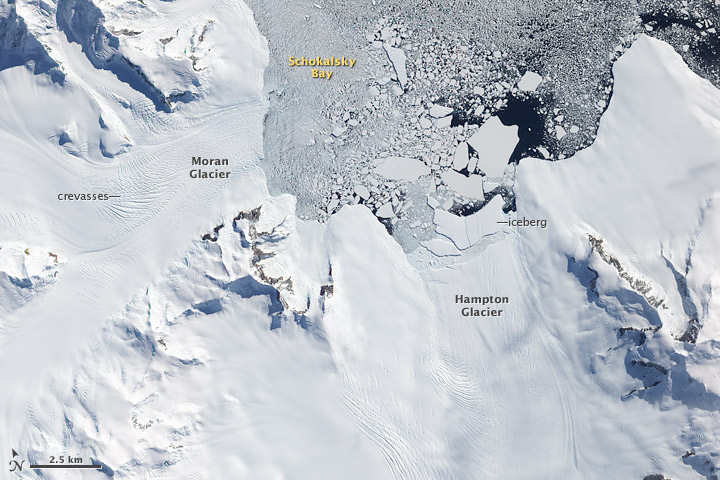

The Douglas Range (70°0′S 69°35′W) is a sharp-crested range, with peaks rising to 3,000 metres, extending 120 km (75 mi) in a northwest–southeast direction from Mount Nicholas to Mount Edred and forming a steep east escarpment of Alexander Island within the British Antarctic Territory, overlooking the north part of George VI Sound.

After the French polar explorer Jean-Baptiste Charcot was the first to sight Mount Nicholas in 1909, the American polar explorer Lincoln Ellsworth determined the entire extent of the mountain during an overflight on November 23, 1935. The resulting aerial photographs were used by Ellworth's compatriot WLG Joerg for a rough cartographic survey. The eastern flank of the range was surveyed superficially in 1936 from George VI Sound by participants in the British Graham Land Expedition (1934–1937) under the direction of the Australian polar explorer John Rymill. The Falkland Islands Dependencies Survey undertook a new survey of the area from 1948 to 1950. The entire range, including its western flank, was mapped from aerial photographs taken by the Ronne Antarctic Research Expedition (1947–1948) led by the American polar explorer Finn Ronne. Participants of the British Graham Land Expedition named the mountain range after Admiral Percy Douglas (1876–1939), chairman of the expedition's advisory board.

== Geography ==
Mountains of the Douglas Range
Name of Mountain	Coordinates	Height	Comments
Mount Nicholas	69°22′S 69°50′W	1,465 m	The northernmost mountain of the Douglas Range
Mount Spivey	69°31′S 69°50′W	2,135 m	
Mount Huckle	69°38′S 69°48′W	2,500 m	
Mount Stephenson	69°49′S 69°43′W	2,987 m	The highest peak of the Douglas Range, also the highest point of Alexander Island
Mount Egbert	69°57′S 69°37′W	2,895 m	The second highest peak of the Douglas Range.
Mount Ethelwulf	70°2′S 69°34′W	2,590 m	
Mount Ethelred	70°4′S 69°29′W	2,470 m	
Mount Athelstan	70°10′S 69°16′W	1,615 m	
Lamina Peak	70°32′S 68°45′W	1,280 m	
Mount Edred	70°35′S 69°0′W	2,195 m	The southernmost mountain of the Douglas Range

== History ==
Mount Nicholas was seen in 1909 from a distance by the French Antarctic Expedition under Charcot. The full extent of the range was observed by Lincoln Ellsworth on his trans-Antarctic flight of November 23, 1935, and its east escarpment first roughly mapped from air photos taken on that flight by W.L.G. Joerg. The east face of the range was roughly surveyed from George VI Sound by the British Graham Land Expedition (BGLE) in 1936 and resurveyed by the Falkland Islands Dependencies Survey (FIDS) in 1948–50. The entire range, including the west slopes, was mapped in detail from air photos taken by the Ronne Antarctic Research Expedition (RARE), 1947–48, by Searle of the FIDS in 1960.

The Douglas Range was named by the BGLE, 1934–37, for V. Admiral Sir Percy Douglas, chairman of the BGLE Advisory Committee, member of the Discovery Committee from 1928 until his death in 1939, formerly hydrographer of the Royal Navy.
