= George VI Sound =

Body of water in Palmer Land, Antarctica

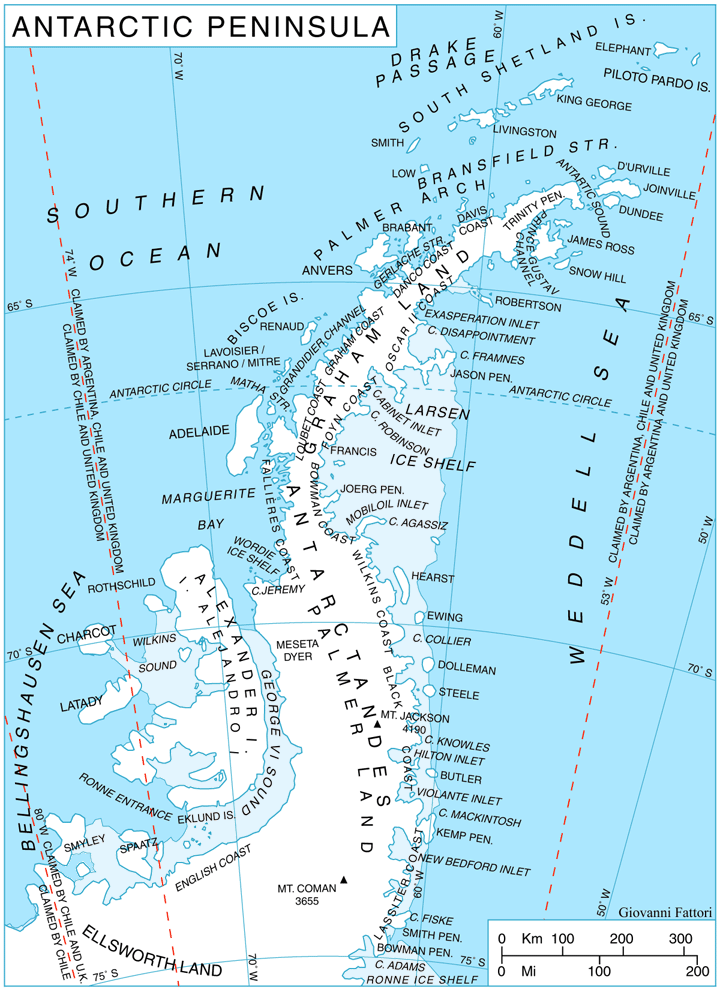
- George Sound within Antarctica
- Interactive map of George VI Sound

Geography
- Location: Antarctica
- Coordinates: 71°00′S 68°00′W

Administration
- Administered under the Antarctic Treaty System

George VI Sound or Canal Jorge VI or Canal Presidente Sarmiento or Canal Seaver or King George VI Sound or King George the Sixth Sound is a major bay/fault depression, 300 miles (483 km) long and mainly covered by a permanent ice shelf. It is in the shape of the letter J without any upper bar. It lines the east and south shores of Alexander Island, separating it from the vestigial, quite small, Wordie Ice Shelf and Palmer Land (the south-west of the Antarctic Peninsula) and the north-facing "English Coast". A quite central point of it is 71°S 68°W.

Various lakes adjoin; these receive large amounts of melt ice from the George VI Ice Shelf. These include Hodgson, Moutonee and Ablation Lakes. Several glaciers flow eastward into the sound from the east interior of Alexander Island, the vast majority of these glaciers are south of Planet Heights, where all of these glaciers are named after moons, satellites and planets of the Solar System in the same vein as the Heights, named by the United Kingdom Antarctic Place-Names Committee (UK-APC) in 1977.

The sound is largely covered by the George VI Ice Shelf. Ice varies from about 15 miles (24 km) to more than 40 miles (64 km) wide. George VI Sound was discovered by Lincoln Ellsworth who flew over it in 1935. The sound was explored by the British Graham Land Expedition (BGLE) in 1936–37 and by the United States Antarctic Service (USAS) in 1940. The sound was named by John Riddoch Rymill, leader of the BGLE, for George VI, King of the United Kingdom and last Emperor of India.

The McLaughlin Cliffs overlook George VI Sound between Armstrong Glacier and Conchie Glacier.
