= British Graham Land expedition =

Geophysical and exploration expedition to Graham Land in Antarctica

The British Graham Land expedition (BGLE) was a geophysical and exploration expedition to Graham Land in Antarctica between 1934 and 1937. Under the leadership of John Rymill, the expedition spent two years in the Antarctic. The expedition determined that Graham Land was a peninsula. The expedition used a combination of traditional and modern practices in Antarctic exploration, using both dog teams and motor sledges as well as a single-engine de Havilland Fox Moth aircraft for exploration. Transportation to the Antarctic was in an elderly three-masted sailing ship christened the Penola, which had an unreliable auxiliary engine. Additional supplies were brought on the ship Discovery II.

The expedition was one of the last privately sponsored Antarctic missions, with only part of the cost covered by the UK government. Although the expedition had a very small budget, it was successful in its scientific objectives. Air survey photography and mapping was carried out for 1000 miles (1600 km) of the Graham Land coast.

All sixteen members of the landing party received the Polar Medal. The participants of the BGLE included:

- Duncan Carse who transferred onto the expedition ship at the Falkland Islands
- Launcelot Fleming who later became Bishop of Portsmouth and later the Bishop of Norwich
- Dr. Brian Birley Roberts, who later contributed to the drafting of the Antarctic Treaty
- Edward W. Bingham, in charge of the expedition's sled dogs
- Quintin Riley
- Robert Ryder, who captained the Penola and later won the Victoria Cross in the St Nazaire Raid

== See also ==
- List of Antarctic expeditions
- Noel Atherton
- Discovery Investigations
