= Alexander Island =

Island in the Bellingshausen Sea off Antarctica

- Satellite image of Alexander Island

- Location of Alexander Island

- Location in Antarctica

Geography
- Location: Antarctica
- Coordinates: 71°00′S 70°00′W
- Area: 49,070 km^{2} (18,950 sq mi)
- Area rank: 28th
- Length: 390 km (242 mi)
- Width: 80 km (50 mi)
- Highest elevation: 2,987 m (9800 ft)
- Highest point: Mount Stephenson

Administration
- Administered under the Antarctic Treaty System

Demographics
- Population: 0 (2000)

Alexander Island, also known as Alexander I Island, Alexander I Land, Alexander Land, Alexander I Archipelago, and Zemlja Alexandra I, is the largest island of Antarctica. It lies in the Bellingshausen Sea west of Palmer Land, Antarctic Peninsula from which it is separated by Marguerite Bay and George VI Sound. The George VI Ice Shelf entirely fills George VI Sound and connects Alexander Island to Palmer Land. The island partly surrounds Wilkins Sound, which lies to its west. Alexander Island is about 390 kilometres (240 mi) long in a north–south direction, 80 kilometres (50 mi) wide in the north, and 240 kilometres (150 mi) wide in the south. Alexander Island is the second-largest uninhabited island in the world, after Devon Island.

== History ==
Alexander Island was discovered on January 28, 1821, by a Russian expedition under Fabian Gottlieb von Bellingshausen, who named it Alexander I Land for the reigning Tsar Alexander I of Russia.

What, in fact, is an island, was believed to be part of the Antarctic mainland until 1940. Its insular nature was proven in December 1940, by a two-person sledge party composed of Finn Ronne and Carl Eklund of the United States Antarctic Service. In the 1950s, a British base administered as part of the British Antarctic Territory was constructed as Fossil Bluff (Base KG).

The island was claimed by the United Kingdom in 1908 as part of the British Antarctic Territory. Territorial claims have also been set by both Chile (in 1940) and Argentina (in 1942). Currently, under the Antarctic Treaty no claim has been officially recognized. The island contains the British Fossil Bluff meteorological centre and refuelling base.

== Geography ==
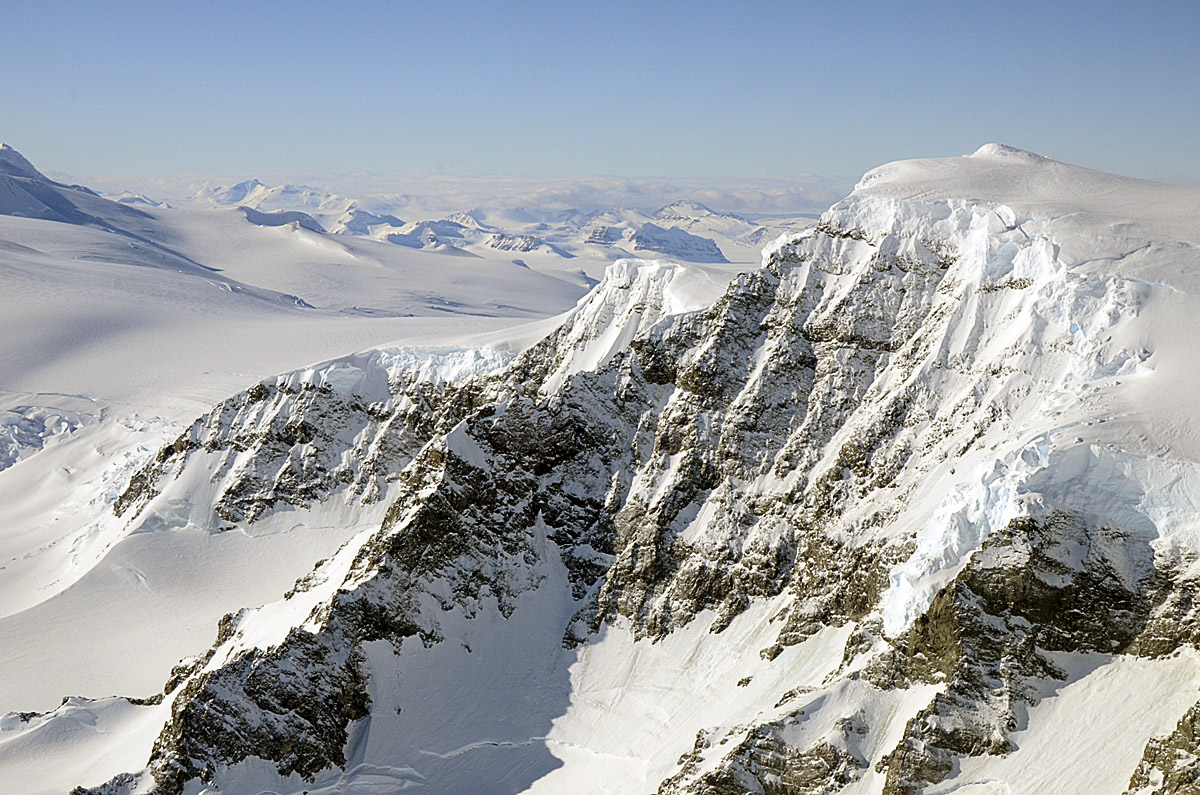
Alexander Island Mountain Ranges

The surface of Alexander Island is predominantly ice-covered. There exist some exposed nunataks and a few ice-free areas of significant size, including Ablation Point Massif. The nunataks are the peaks of north–south trending mountain ranges and hills. They include the Colbert, Havre, Lassus, Rouen, Sofia University, and Walton Mountains, the Staccato Peaks, the Lully Foothills, the Finlandia Foothills, the Elgar Uplands, and the Douglas Range. These mountains, peaks, hills, and uplands are surrounded by a permanent ice sheet, which consists of glaciers that flow off of Alexander Island. These glaciers flow west into the Bach and Wilkins Ice Shelves and Bellingshausen Sea, and east into the George VI Ice Shelf. The George VI Ice Shelf is fed by both by outlet glaciers from the ice cap on Palmer Land and Alexander Island.

Another notable feature of Alexander Island is Hodgson Lake, a former subglacial lake that has emerged from under an ice sheet that had covered it. Hodgson Lake is 2 km (1.2 mi) long by 1.5 km (0.93 mi), and has a 93.4 m (306 ft) deep water column that lies sealed beneath a 3.6 to 4.0 m (11.8 to 13.1 ft) thick perennial lake ice.

The northern side of Hodgson Lake is bounded by the Saturn Glacier, which flows east into George VI Sound, while the southern side of Hodgson Lake is bounded by the northern face of Citadel Bastion. During the Last Glacial Maximum, Hodgson Lake was covered by the ice sheet at least 470 m (1,540 ft) thick.

This ice sheet started thinning about 13,500 years ago. It retreated and left Hodgson Lake covered by perennial ice sometime before 11,000 years ago. This lake has been covered by perennial ice since that time.

Other features on the island include Damocles Point and Mount Tyrrell.

=== Brahms Inlet ===
Brahms Inlet (71°28′S 73°41′W) is an ice-filled inlet, 25 nautical miles (46 km) long and 6 nautical miles (11 km) wide, indenting the north side of Beethoven Peninsula on Alexander Island between Harris Peninsula and Derocher Peninsula, while the headland Mazza Point lies immediately northeast of the inlet and Mount Grieg lies immediately southeast of the base of Brahms Inlet. It was observed from the air and first mapped by the Ronne Antarctic Research Expedition (RARE), 1947–48, and re-mapped from the RARE air photos by Derek J.H. Searle of the Falkland Islands Dependencies Survey in 1960. It was named by the UK Antarctic Place-Names Committee after Johannes Brahms, the German composer.

=== Harris Peninsula ===
Harris Peninsula (71°31′S 74°6′W) is a broad snow-covered peninsula surmounted by Mount Lee, between Verdi Inlet and Brahms Inlet on the north side of the Beethoven Peninsula, located in the southwest portion of Alexander Island, Antarctica. It is one of eight peninsulas of Alexander Island. It was photographed from the air by the RARE, 1947–48, and mapped from these photographs by D. Searle of the Falkland Islands Dependencies Survey, 1960. It was named by the Advisory Committee on Antarctic Names for Commander Michael J. Harris, U.S. Navy, commanding officer of Squadron VXE-6, from May 1982 to May 1983.

=== Lyadov Glacier ===
Lyadov Glacier (71°32′00″S 73°45′00″W) is a glacier flowing east-northeast from Harris Peninsula, Alexander Island, into Brahms Inlet. It was named by the USSR Academy of Sciences in 1987 after Anatoly Lyadov (1855–1914), a Russian composer.

== Geology ==
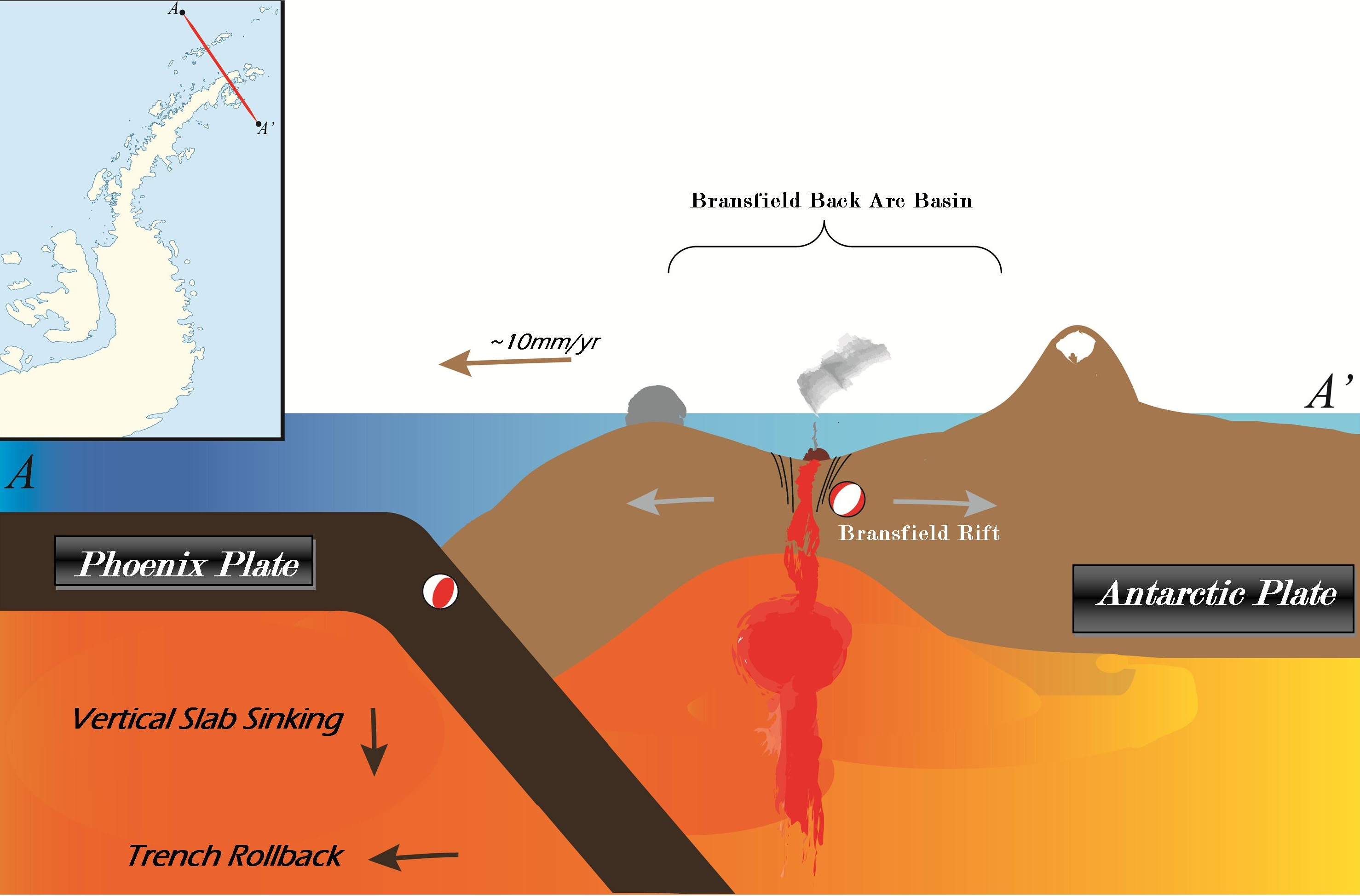
Antarctic Peninsula's tectonic movement

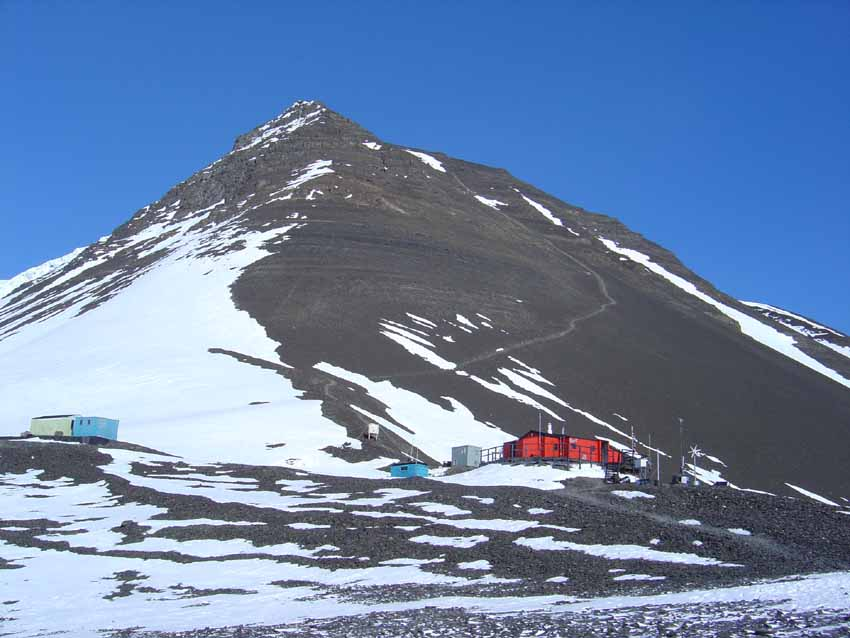
Fossil Bluff base on Alexander Island

According to Hole, "The geology of Alexander Island can be attributed mainly to processes associated with the subduction of proto-Pacific oceanic crust along the western margin of the Antarctic Peninsula, from latest Triassic to Late Tertiary times." The LeMay Group accretionary prism complex, along with plutonic and volcanic rocks, are prevalent along the western portion of the island. The LeMay Group consists of variably-deformed and metamorphosed sedimentary and igneous rocks. Although it is dominated by deformed arkosic sedimentary rocks, it includes turbiditic greywackes, black mudstones, and conglomerates. The 4-kilometre (2.5-mile) thick Upper Jurassic to Lower Cretaceous Fossil Bluff Group sedimentary rocks outcrop as a 250 km (160 mi) long by 30 km (19 mi) wide belt along the eastern coast. This Fossil Bluff Group consists of a basal deep-marine assemblage 2,200 meters (7,200 feet) thick, overlain by a mudstone assemblage up to 950 m (3,120 ft) thick, followed by a shallow-marine assemblage of coarsening upward sandstones. Alkali basalts erupted after the cessation of subduction. These range in age from the tephrites at Mount Pinafore (5.5–7.6 Ma), to the basanites at Rothschild Island (5.5 Ma) and Hornpipe Heights (2.5 Ma), to the alkali and olivine basalts on Beethoven Peninsula (<1–2.5 Ma).

The LeMay Range Fault trends N-S, parallel to the George VI Sound, and the Fossil Bluff Formation is downfaulted to the east of this fault against the LeMay Group. Sand dykes are found against this fault zone and in many other parts of the Fossil Bay Formation. Fossils within the Fossil Bluff Formation include ammonites, belemnites, bivalves, and serpulids.

== See also ==
- Adelaide Island
- Argentine Antarctica
- British Antarctic Territory
- Chilean Antarctic Territory
- Composite Antarctic Gazetteer
- Geology of the Antarctic Peninsula
- List of Antarctic islands south of 60° S
- List of Bulgarian toponyms in Antarctica
- Peel Cirque
- Scarab Bluff
- SCAR
- Territorial claims in Antarctica
- Witt Bluff
